= 1873 Vienna World's Fair =

International exhibition of the 19th century

1873 Vienna
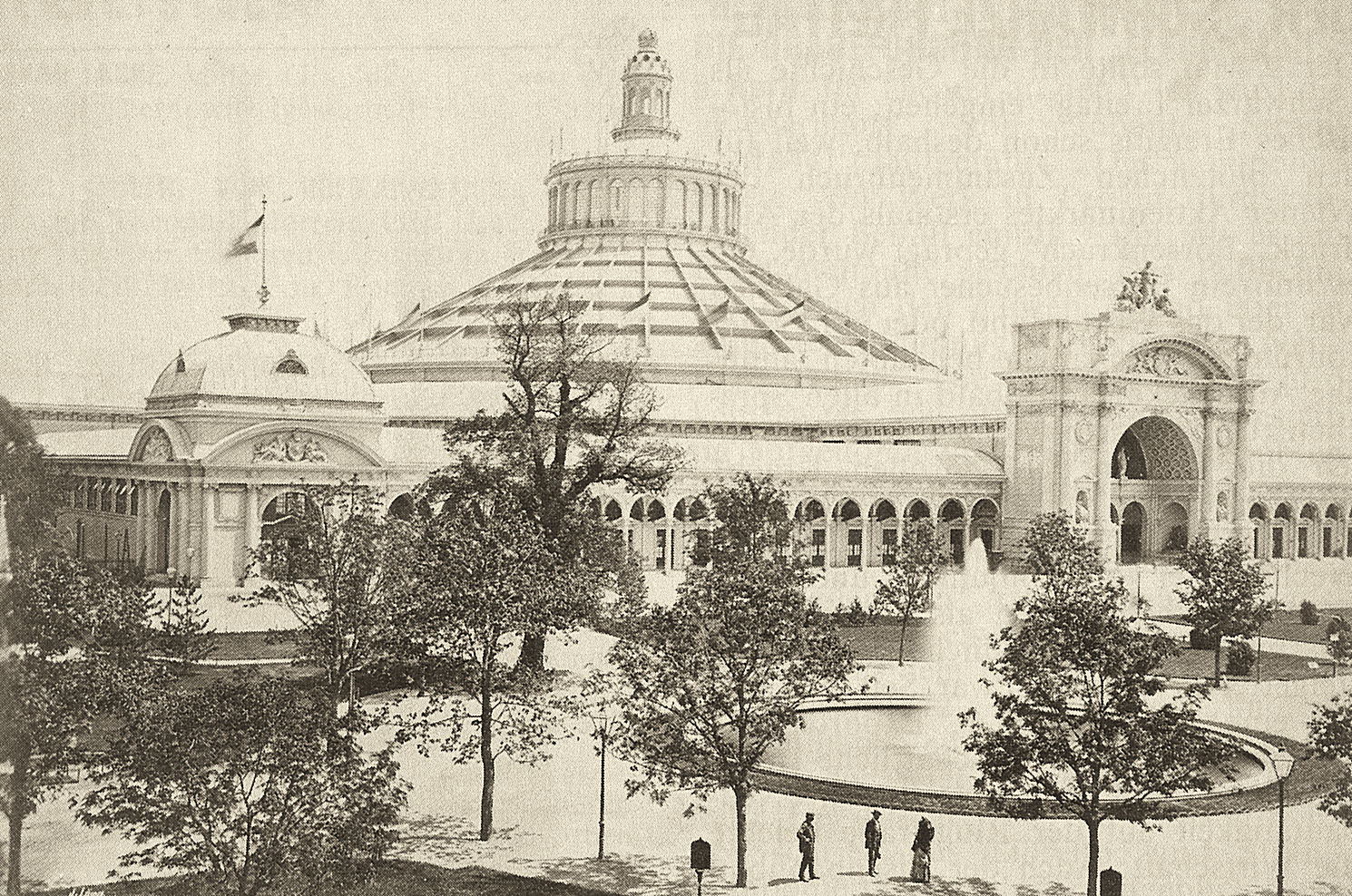
- The Rotunde, the centre of the exhibition

Overview
- BIE-class: Universal exposition
- Category: Historical Expo
- Name: Weltausstellung
- Motto: Culture and Education (German: Kultur und Erziehung)
- Building(s): The Rotunde
- Area: 233 ha (580 acres)
- Visitors: 7,255,000

Location
- Country: Austria-Hungary
- City: Vienna
- Venue: Prater
- Coordinates: 48°12′58″N 16°23′44″E

Timeline
- Opening: May 1 – October 31, 1873 (5 months, 4 weeks and 2 days)
- Closure: 31 October 1873; 152 years ago

Universal expositions
- Previous: Exposition Universelle (1867) in Paris
- Next: Centennial Exposition in Philadelphia

The 1873 Vienna World's Fair (German: Weltausstellung 1873 Wien) was a large world exposition that was held from 1 May to 31 October 1873 in the Austria-Hungarian capital Vienna. Its motto was "Culture and Education" (German: Kultur und Erziehung).

== History ==
As well as being a chance to showcase Austro-Hungarian industry and culture, the World's Fair in Vienna commemorated Franz Joseph I's 25th year as emperor. The main grounds were in the Prater, a park near the Danube River, and preparations cost £23.4 million. It lasted from May 1 to November 2, hosting about 7,225,000 visitors.

53,000 exhibitors from 35 countries took part. In preparation for the 1873 Vienna World's Fair new hotels, cafes, and restaurants opened in Vienna, among them the Hotel Imperial which was converted from a residential palace to a grand hotel. Six new railway stations were built, launching Vienna as a European railway hub. The target of 20 million visitors was not reached due to a cholera outbreak and a stock exchange crash.

== Facilities ==
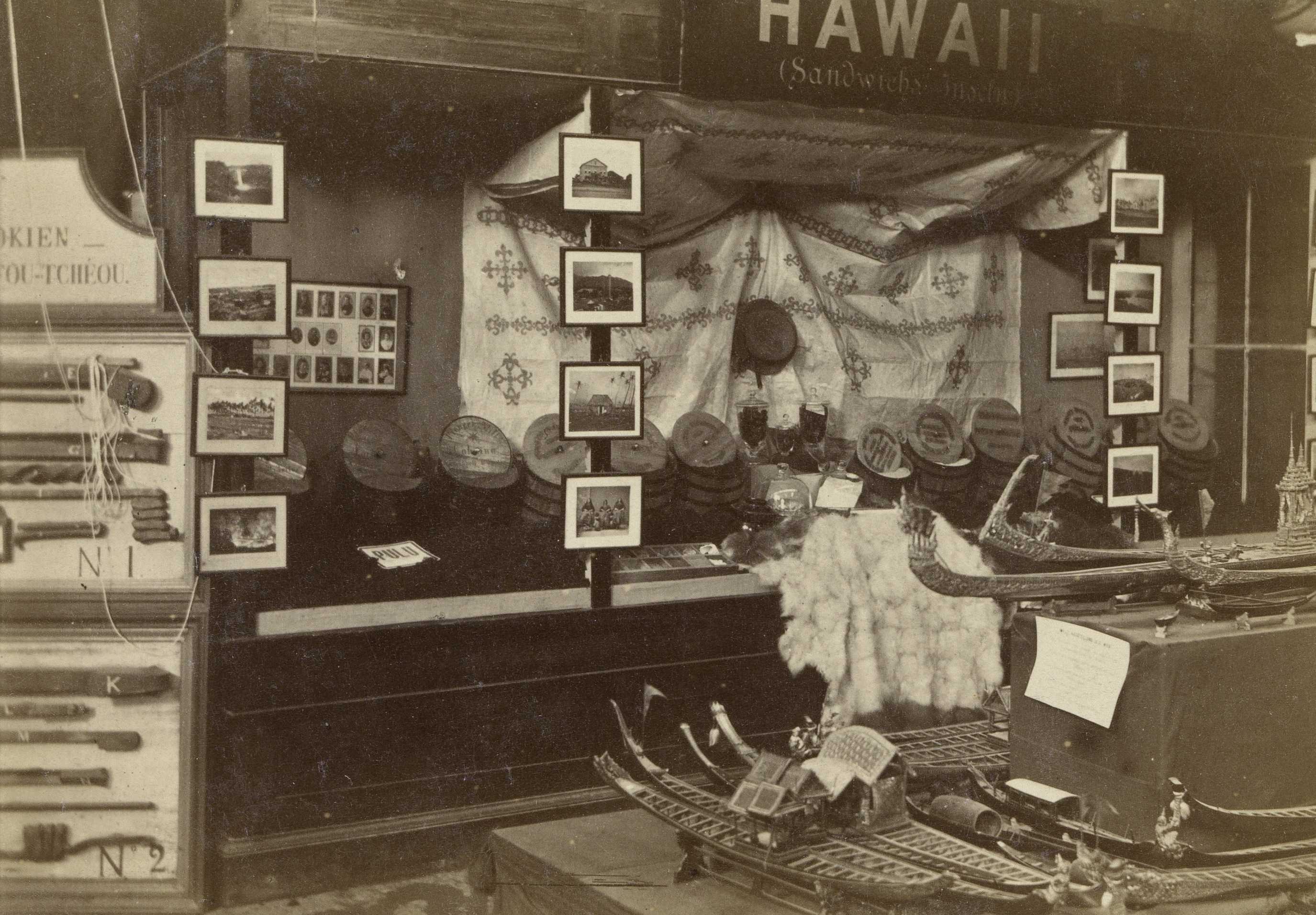
Hawaiʻi Division - Sandwich Islands (Nr. 1624); photography by György Klösz

Exhibitors were housed in different buildings that were erected for this exposition, including the Rotunda (Rotunde), a large circular building in the great park of Prater designed by the Scottish engineer John Scott Russell. (The fair Rotunda was destroyed by fire on 17 September 1937.) Even countries from far away like the Hawaiian Kingdom were represented at the fair.

=== Italian pavilion ===
Professor Lodovico Brunetti of Padua, Italy first displayed cremated ashes at the exhibition. He showed a model of the crematory, one of the first modern ones. He exhibited it with a sign reading, "Vermibus erepti, puro consummimur igni," in English, "Saved from the worms, we are consumed by the flames."

=== Japanese pavilion ===
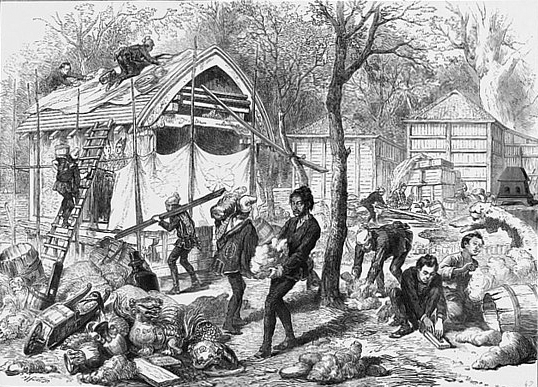

The Japanese exhibition at the fair was the product of years of preparation. The empire had received its invitation in 1871, close on the heels of the Meiji Restoration, and a government bureau was established to produce an appropriate response. Shigenobu Okuma, Tsunetami Sano, and its other officials were keen to use the event to raise the international standing of Japanese manufactures and boost exports. 24 engineers were also sent with its delegation to study cutting-edge Western engineering at the fair for use in Japanese industry. Art and cultural relics at the exhibit were verified by the Jinshin Survey, a months-long inspection tour of various imperial, noble, and temple holdings around the country. The most important products of each province were listed and two specimens of each were collected, one for display in Vienna and the other for preservation and display within Japan. Large-scale preparatory exhibitions with this second set of objects were conducted within Japan at the Tokyo Kaisei School (today the University of Tokyo) in 1871 and at the capital's Confucian Temple in 1872; they eventually formed the core collection of the institution that became the Tokyo National Museum.

Forty-one Japanese officials and government interpreters, as well as six Europeans in Japanese employ, came to Vienna to oversee the pavilion and the fair's cultural events. 25 craftsmen and gardeners created the main pavilion, as well as a full Japanese garden with shrine and a model of the former pagoda at Tokyo's imperial temple. Apart from the collection of regional objects, which focused on ceramics, cloisonné wares, lacquerware, and textiles, the displays also included the female golden shachi from Nagoya Castle and a papier-maché copy of the Kamakura Buddha. The year after the fair, Sano compiled a report on it which ran to 96 volumes divided into 16 parts, including a strong plea for the creation of a museum on western lines in the Japanese capital; the government further began hosting national industrial exhibitions at Ueno Park in 1877.

Le Nil, a French Ship, set off from the port of Triest to Japan loaded with a number of items from the fair, in total 192 boxes. It sank off the Izu Peninsula on March 20, 1874. Some items of art were later recovered. One of the items is a ceramic square dish with grapes by Ogata Kenzan that was exhibited and was recovered.

=== New Zealand pavilion ===
New Zealand was represented at the 1873 Vienna World's Fair by a collection of Māori clubs, mats and cloaks, as well as gold, woodwork, kauri gum and geological specimens. Photographs of New Zealand scenery were shown and examples of flour and beer were provided by local industries. A collection of birds was prepared by a London taxidermist and Emperor Franz Joseph I of Austria-Hungary was said to have been "astonished" by a pair of moa skeletons from the Canterbury Museum. More than 50 awards were collected by New Zealand exhibitors but, apparently, because of a problem of categorisation on the part of the jurors, the moa display was not among them.

=== Ottoman pavilion ===
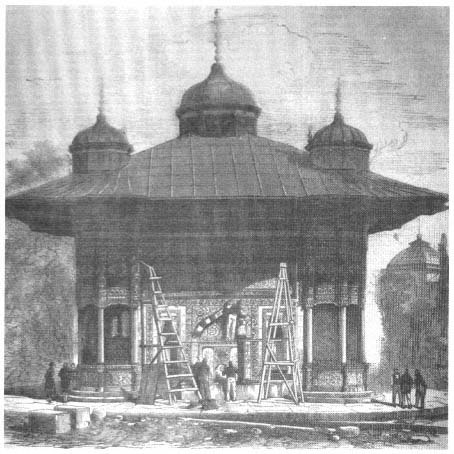
Sultan Ahmed III Fountain reconstructed for the fair.

Osman Hamdi Bey, an archaeologist and painter, was chosen by the Ottoman government as commissary of the empire's exhibits in Vienna. He organized the Ottoman pavilion with Victor Marie de Launay, a French-born Ottoman official and archivist, who had written the catalogue for the Ottoman Empire's exhibition at the 1867 Paris World's Fair. The Ottoman pavilion, located near the Egyptian pavilion (which had its own pavilion despite being a territory of the Ottoman Empire), in the park outside the Rotunde, included small replicas of notable Ottoman buildings and models of vernacular architecture: a replica of the Fountain of Ahmed III at Topkapı Palace, a model Istanbul residence, a representative hamam, a cafe, and a bazaar. The 1873 Ottoman pavilion was more prominent than its pavilion in 1867. The Vienna exhibition set off Western nations' pavilions against Eastern pavilions, with the host, the Austro-Hungarian Empire, setting itself at the juncture between East and West. A report by the Ottoman commission for the exhibition expressed a goal of inspiring with their display "a serious interest [in the Ottoman Empire] on the part of the industrialists, traders, artists, and scholars of other nations...."

The Ottoman pavilion included a gallery of mannequins wearing the traditional costumes of many of the varied ethnic groups of the Ottoman Empire. To supplement the cases of costumes, Osman Hamdi and de Launay created a photographic book of Ottoman costumes, the Elbise-i 'Osmaniyye (Les costumes populaires de la Turquie), with photographs by Pascal Sébah. The photographic plates of the Elbise depicted traditional Ottoman costumes, commissioned from artisans working in the administrative divisions (vilayets) of the Empire, worn by men, women, and children who resembled the various ethnic and religious types of the empire, though the models were all found in Istanbul. The photographs are accompanied by texts describing the costumes in detail and commenting on the rituals and habits of the regions and ethnic groups in question.

=== Persian pavillion ===
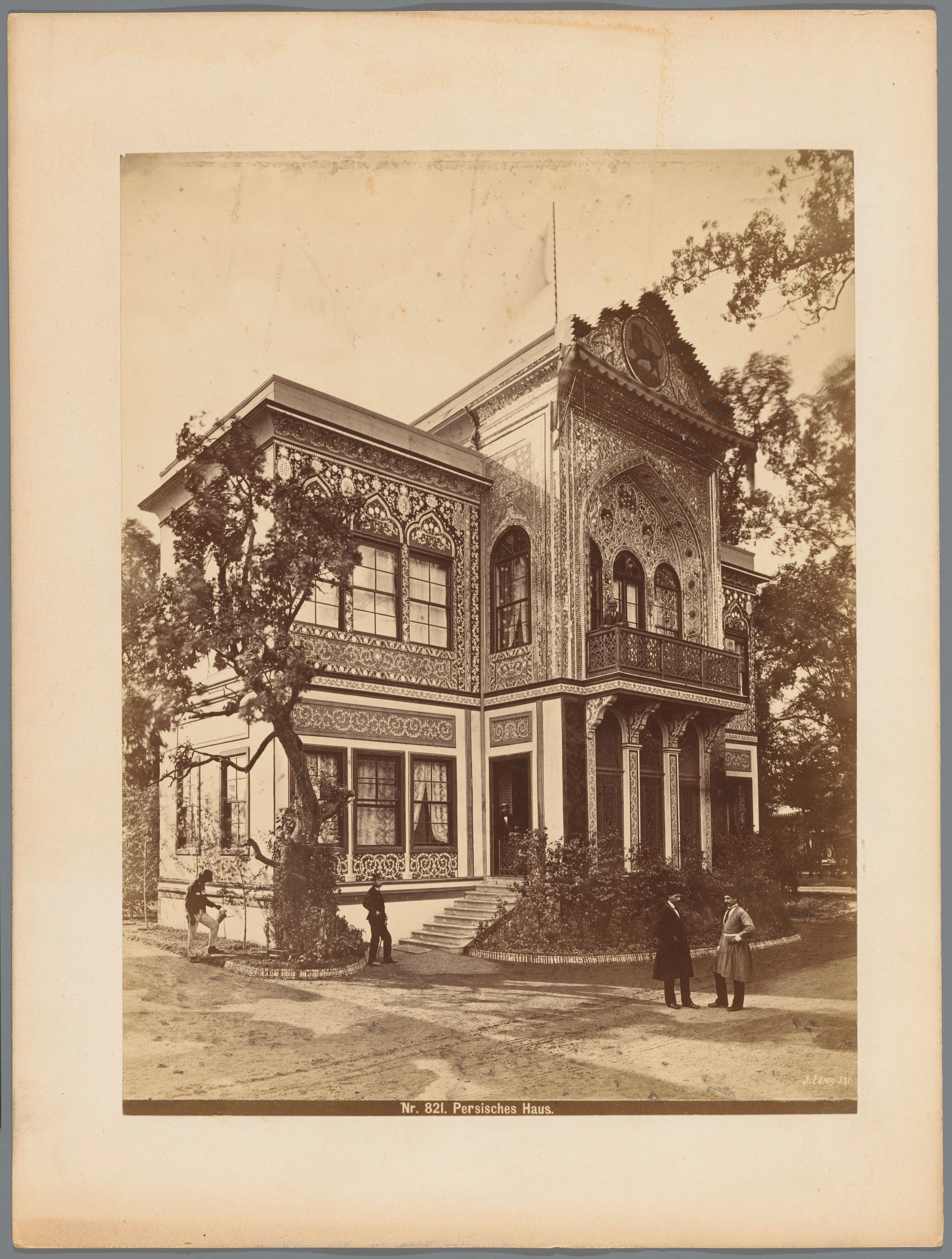
Persian pavilion in 1873 Vienna Fair

Naser al-Din Shah Qajar visited 1873 Vienna Fair and Persian pavilion, in his first European journey and wrote about it extensively, in his handwritten travelogue.

The Iranian pavilion was a two-storey mansion with a centralised plan, reminiscent of kiosks in Iranian architecture. Brick and plaster ornaments were used in the symmetrical façade, which its pillared portico, demonstrated the influence of Western architecture in Qajar Persia. There was also on outdoor tent which was used to illustrate the lifestyle of Iranian nomads. In the official book of the fair, Iranian pavilion was described as a "significant" building. Also, in Scientific American magazine, it was titled a "modern" work.

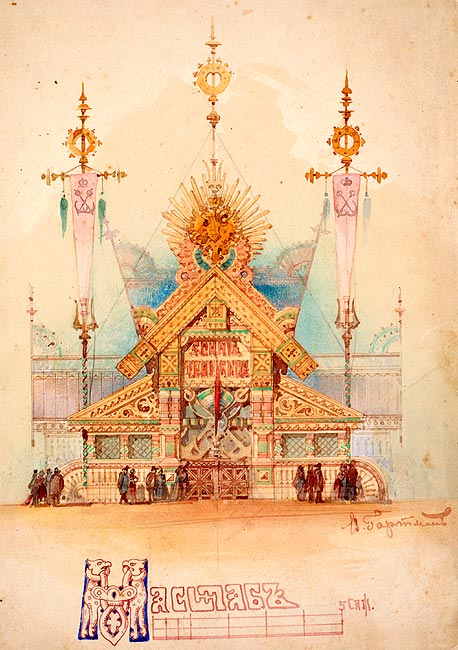
Naval section of the Russian pavilion

=== Russian pavilion ===
The Russian pavilion had a naval section designed by Viktor Hartmann. Exhibits included models of the Port of Rijeka and the Illés Relief model of Jerusalem.

== Gallery ==
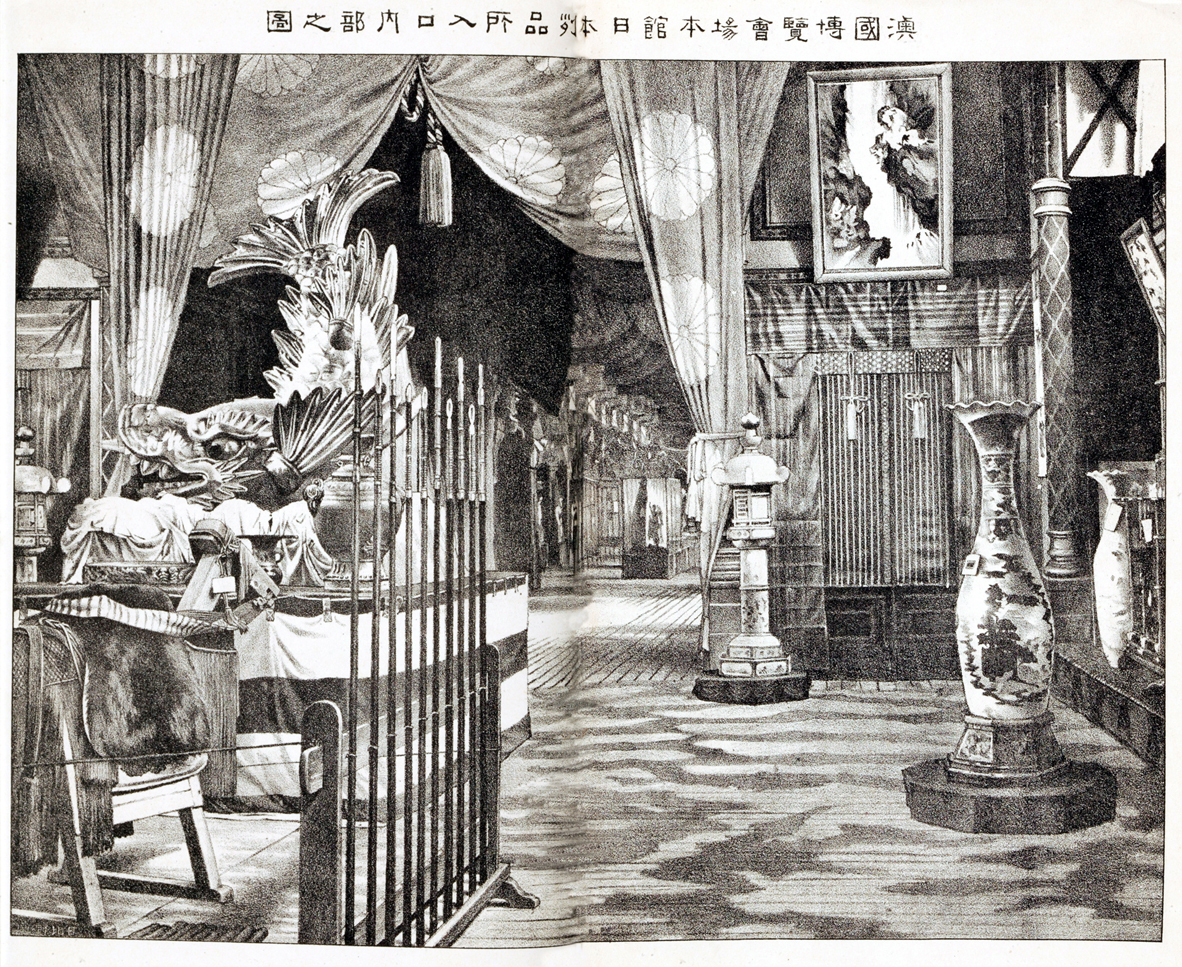
The foyer of the Japanese pavilion, from the Japanese report on the fair compiled under Tsunetami Sano

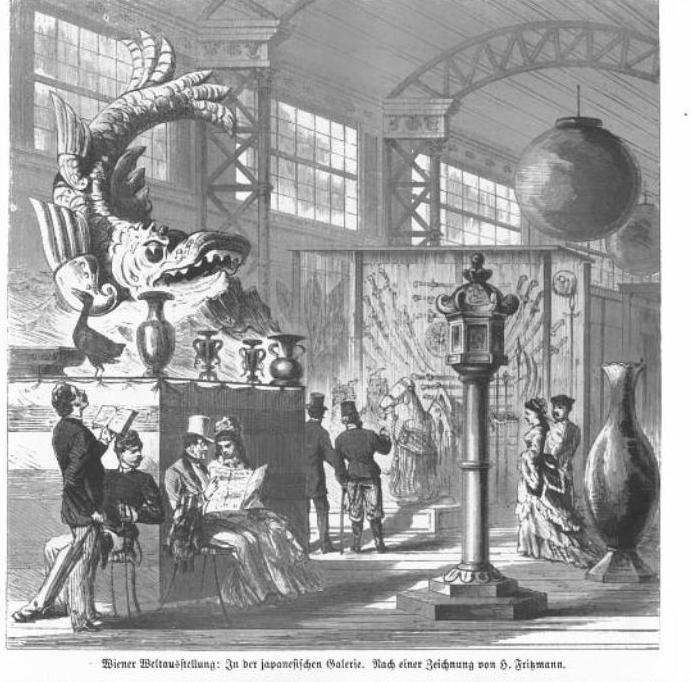
The interior of the pavilion, including the golden shachi, from the Illustrated Times (Illustrirte Zeitung)

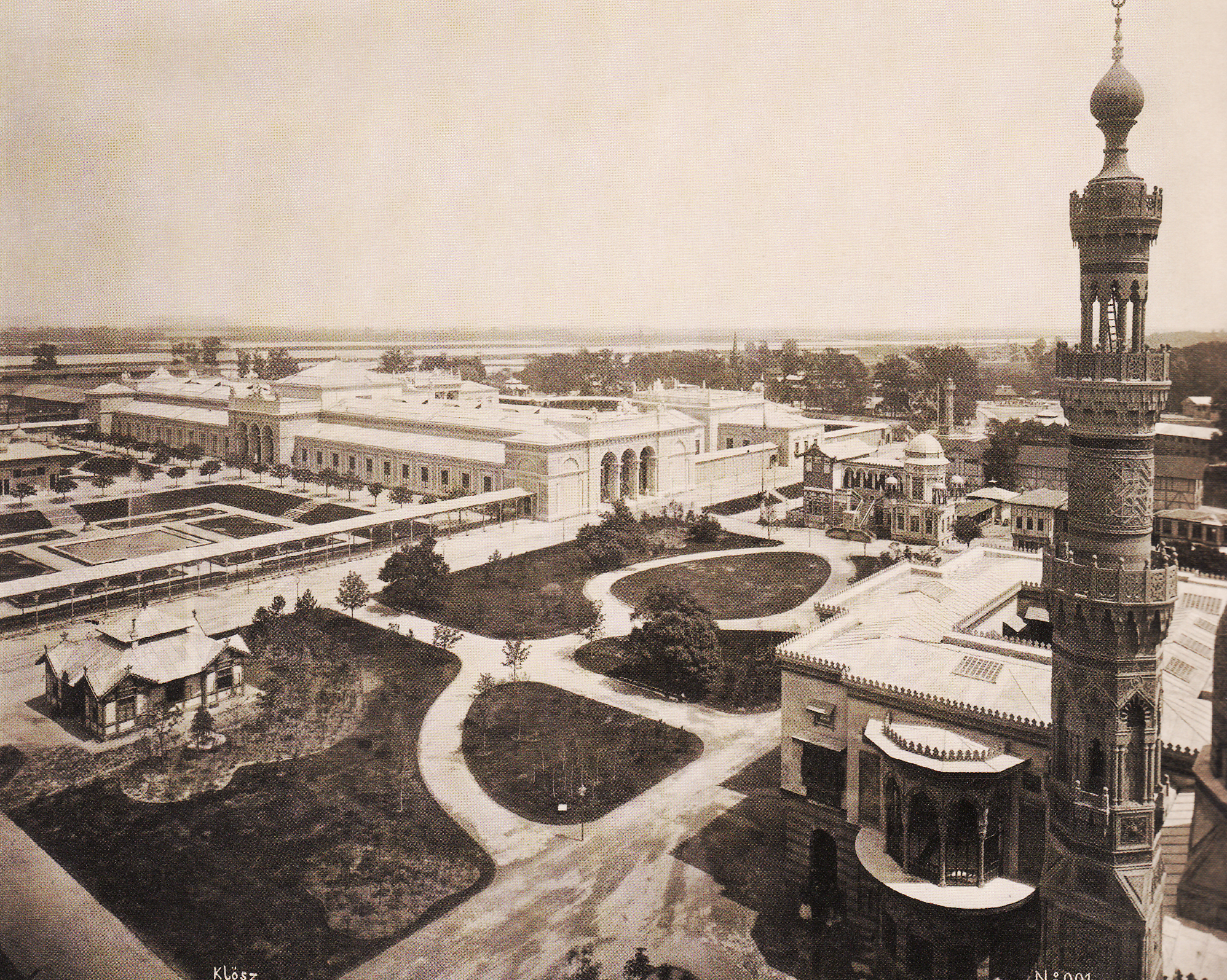
Part of the Japanese display, as seen from one of the Ottoman minarets

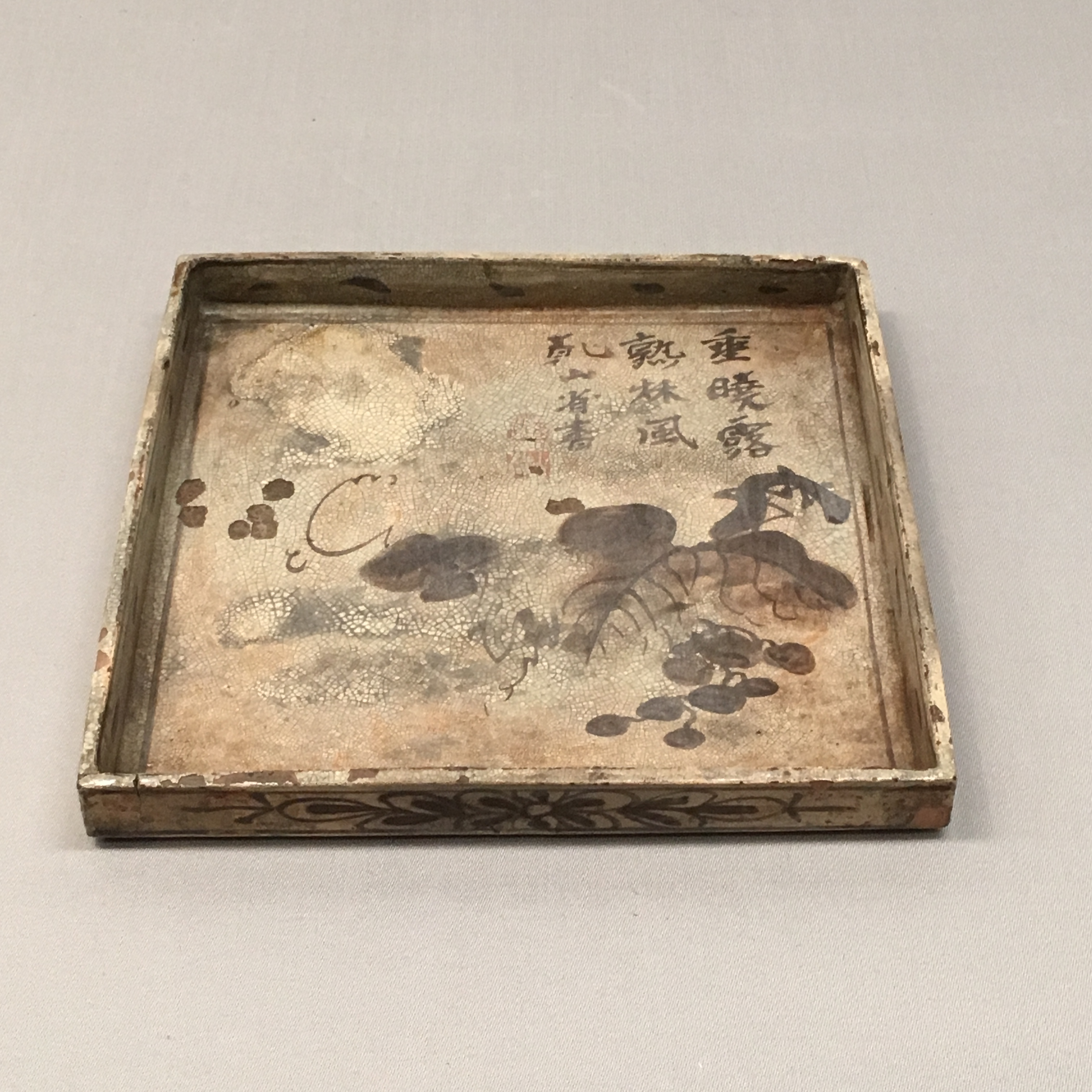
Square dish with grapes by Ogata Kenzan that was exhibited and later lost in the sinking of Le Nil on the way back to Japan and was recovered

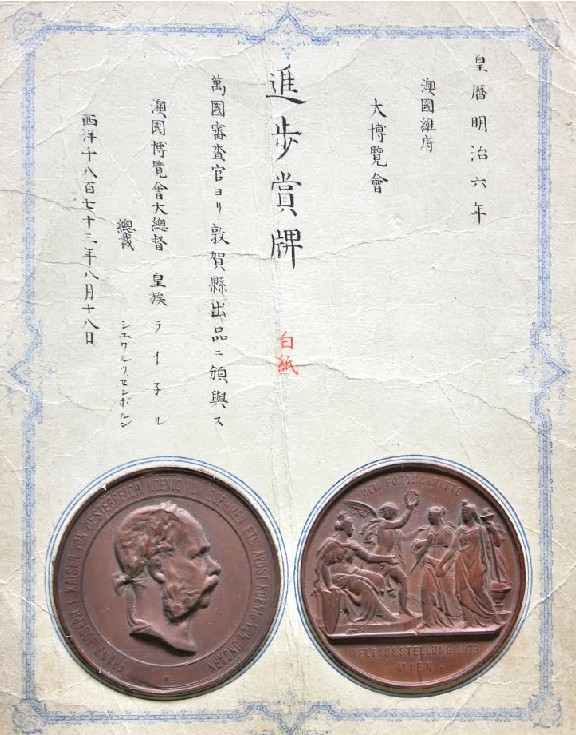
Japanese version of the medal certificate for Echizen paper.

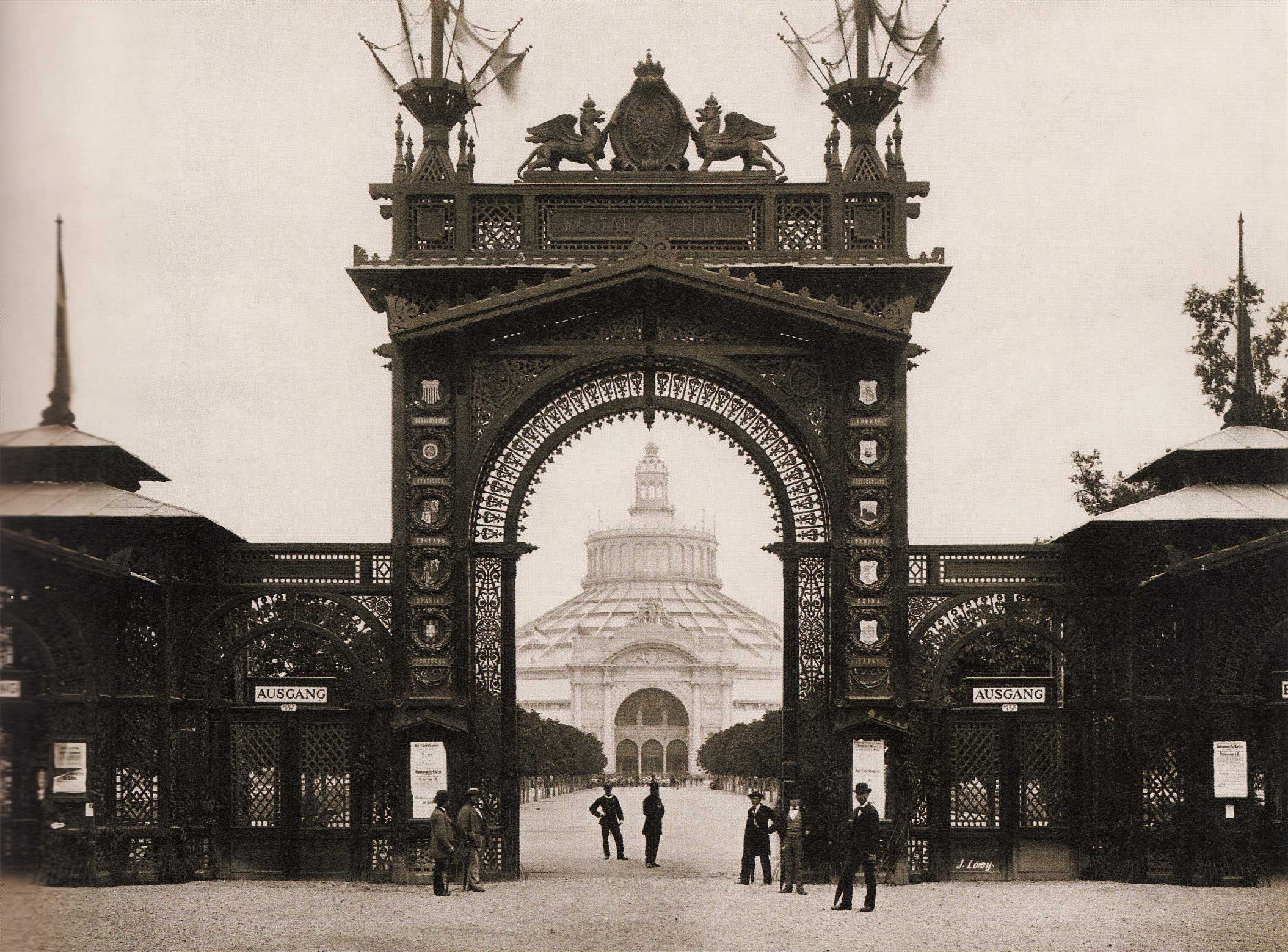
Main entrance to the fair with the Rotunda behind

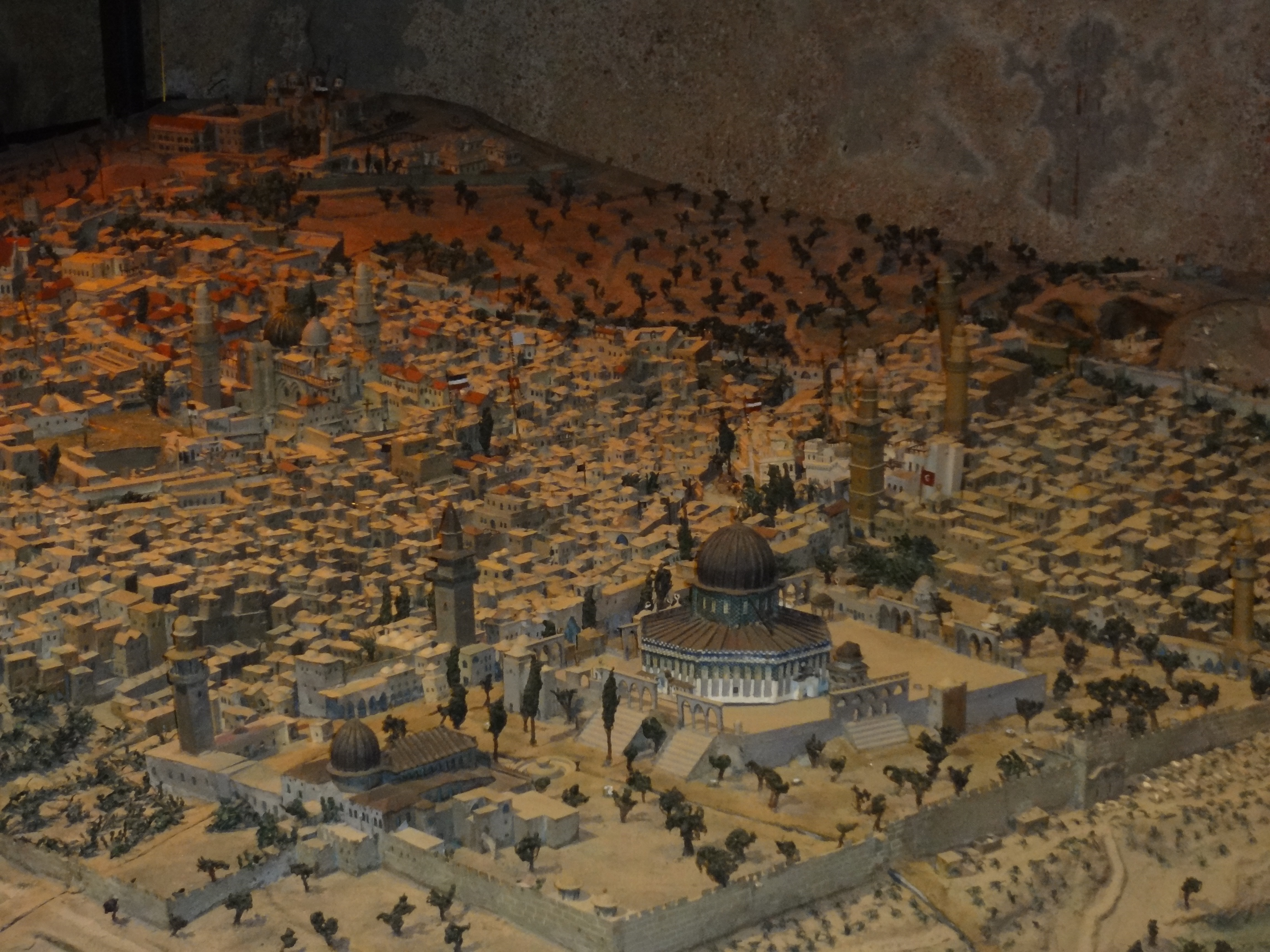
The Illés Relief

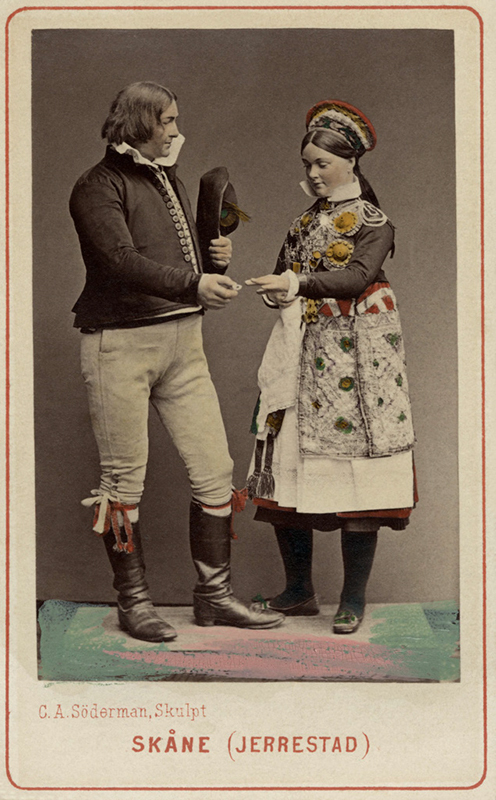
Swedish folk costumes displayed at the exposition

== See also ==
- New Zealand Interprovincial Exhibition (preparatory event in New Zealand)
- Yushima Seidō Exposition (preparatory event in Japan)
