= New Zealand Interprovincial Exhibition =

Exhibition held in 1872 in Christchurch, New Zealand

The New Zealand Interprovincial Exhibition inaugurated on the-then Canterbury Anniversary Day 16 December 1872 ran until 8 January 1873 and was held in the Drill Hall, Christchurch, Canterbury. A principal purpose was to select the New Zealand exhibits for the World's Fair 1873 in Vienna, Austria (Wiener Weltausstellung) from 1 May 1873 to 2 November 1873.

== Award medals and Certificates issued in Christchurch ==
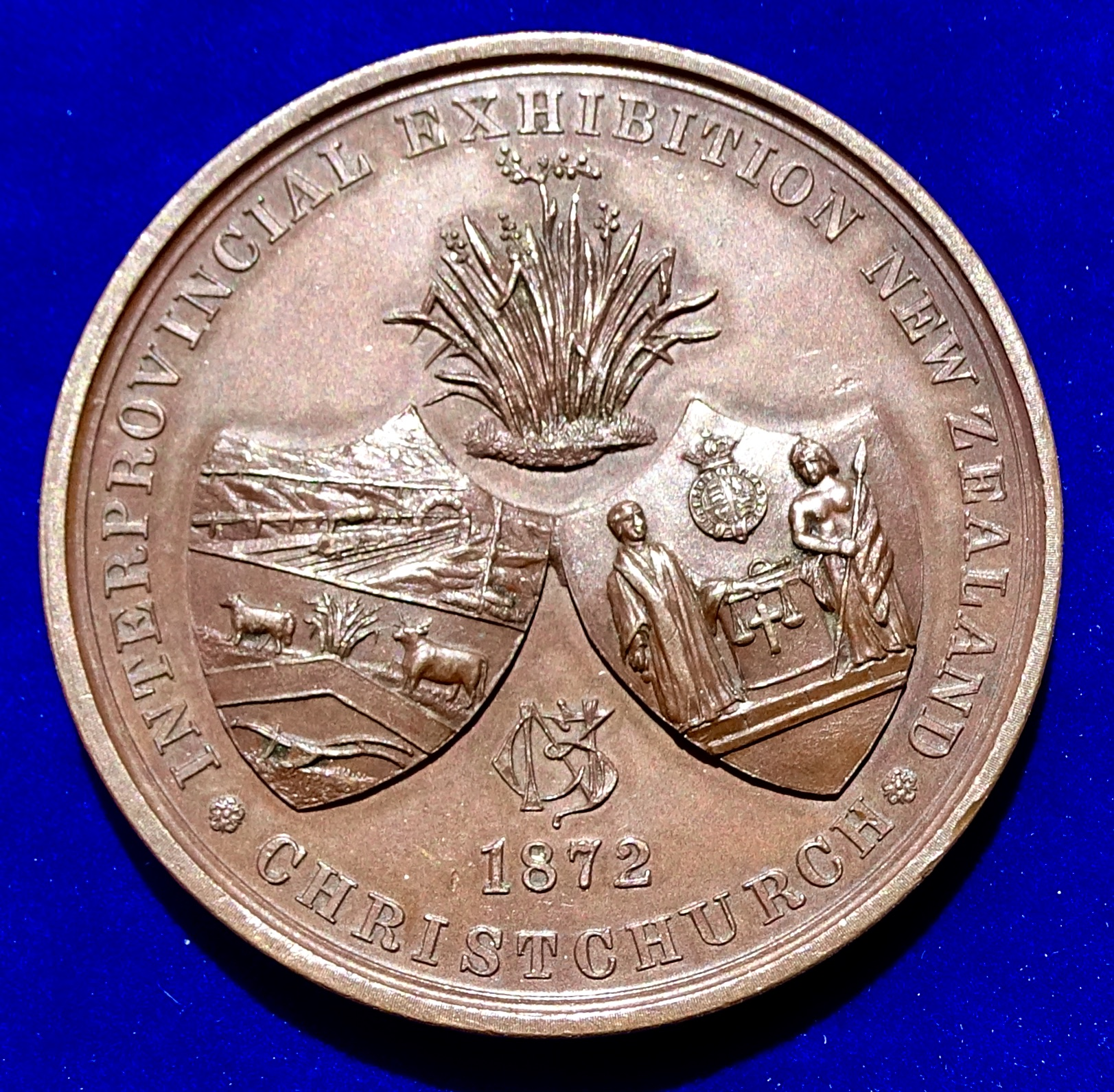
New Zealand Interprovincial Exhibition 1872, Christchurch prize medal in bronze, obverse

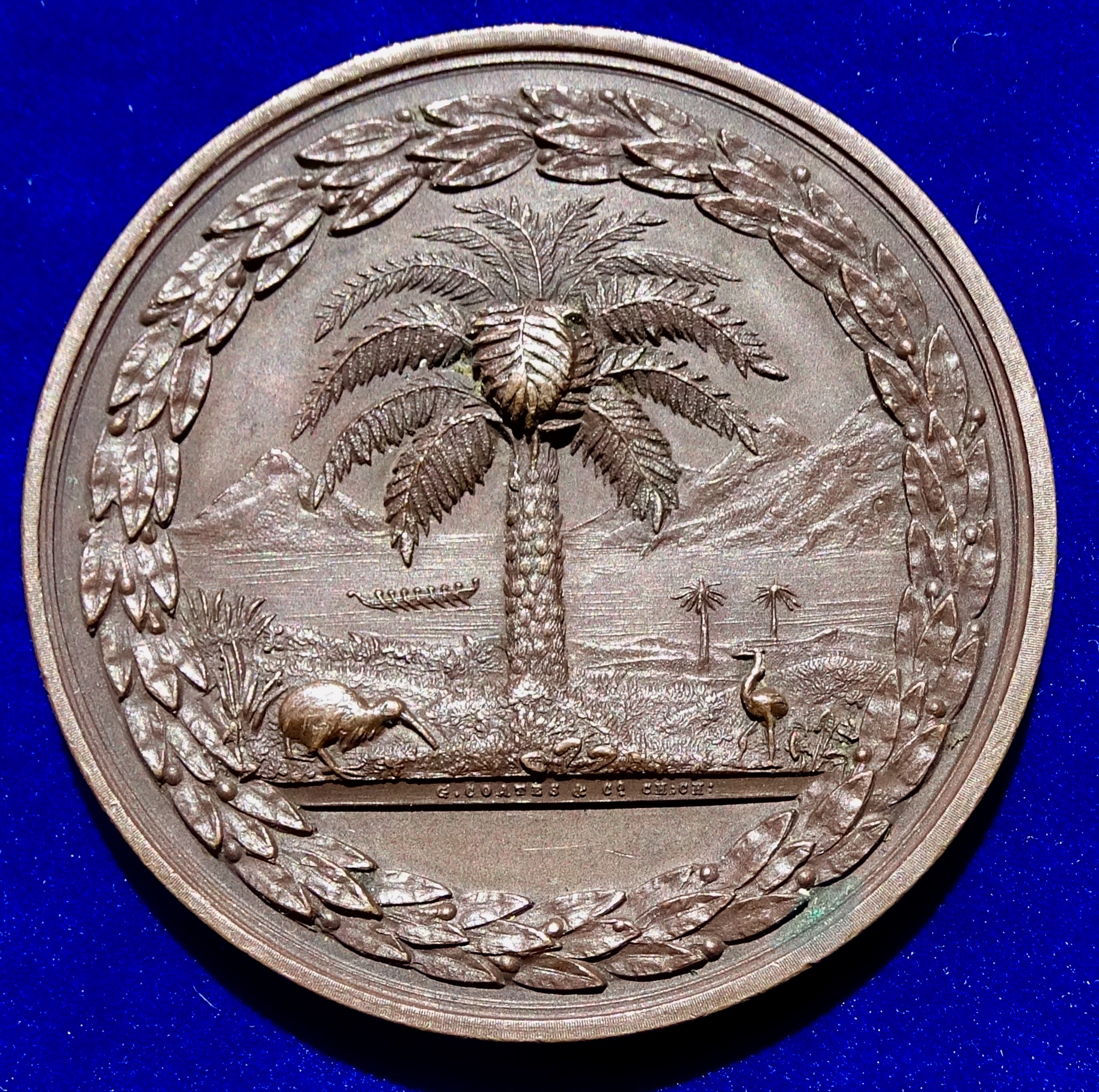
New Zealand Interprovincial Exhibition 1872, Christchurch prize medal, reverse

Recommendations from the prize juries were published prematurely and led many exhibitors to think they had won silver medals. However, the exhibition finances did not permit this largesse.

Finally, a total number of 132 medals and certificates were awarded by the Christchurch Executive Committee to a total of 256 exhibitors from different NZ provinces:

1. 36 x 2nd Class Certificates
2. 45 x 1st Class Certificates
3. 48 x Bronze Medals
4. 3 x Silver Medals

Twenty-eight crates of selected exhibits were forwarded to Vienna on 15 January.
