= Manufacturing in Japan =

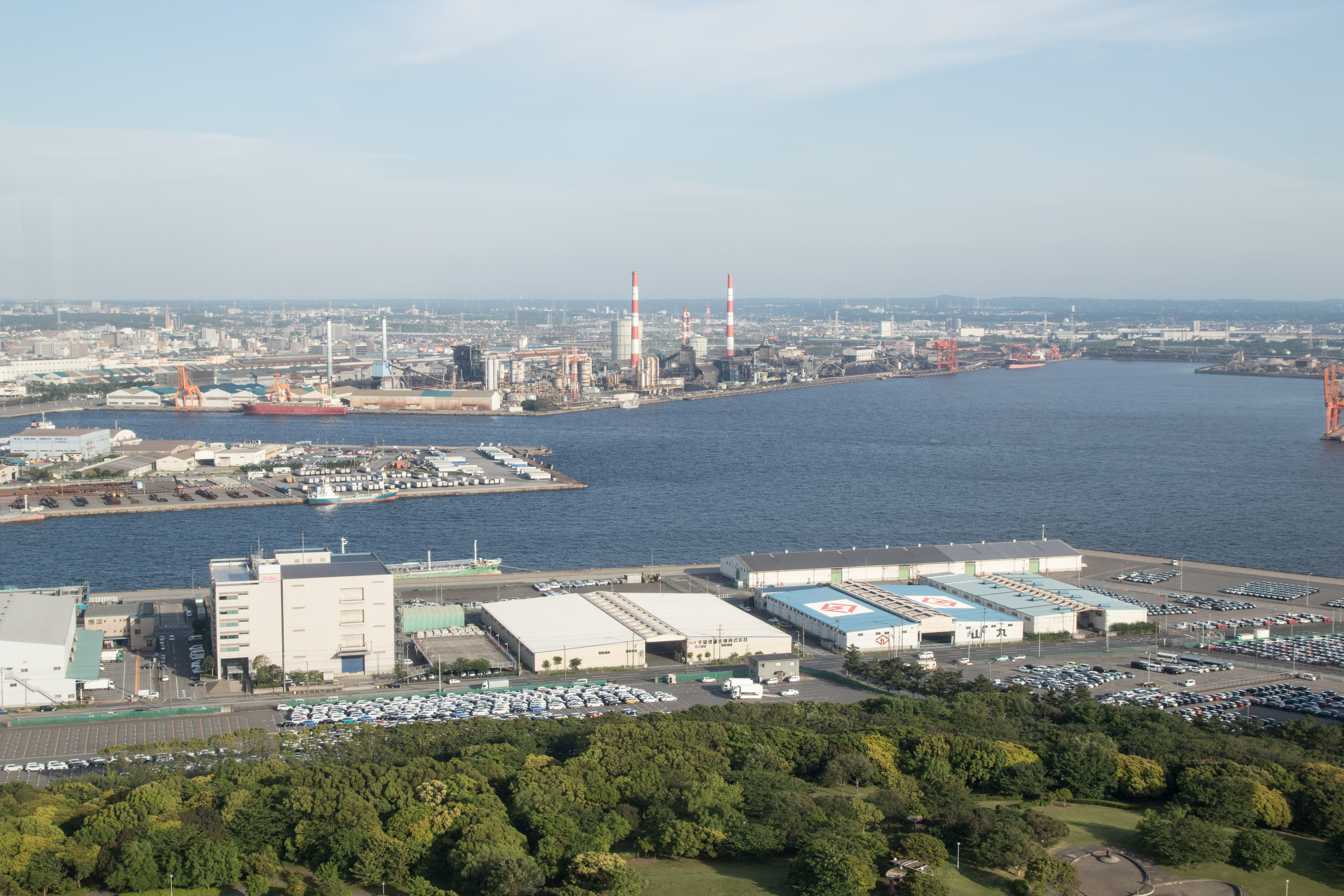
Keiyō industrial region in Chiba Prefecture, Japan

Japan's major export industries include automobiles, consumer electronics (see Electronics industry in Japan), computers, semiconductors, copper, and iron and steel. Additional key industries in Japan's economy are petrochemicals, pharmaceuticals, bioindustry, shipbuilding, aerospace, textiles, and processed foods.

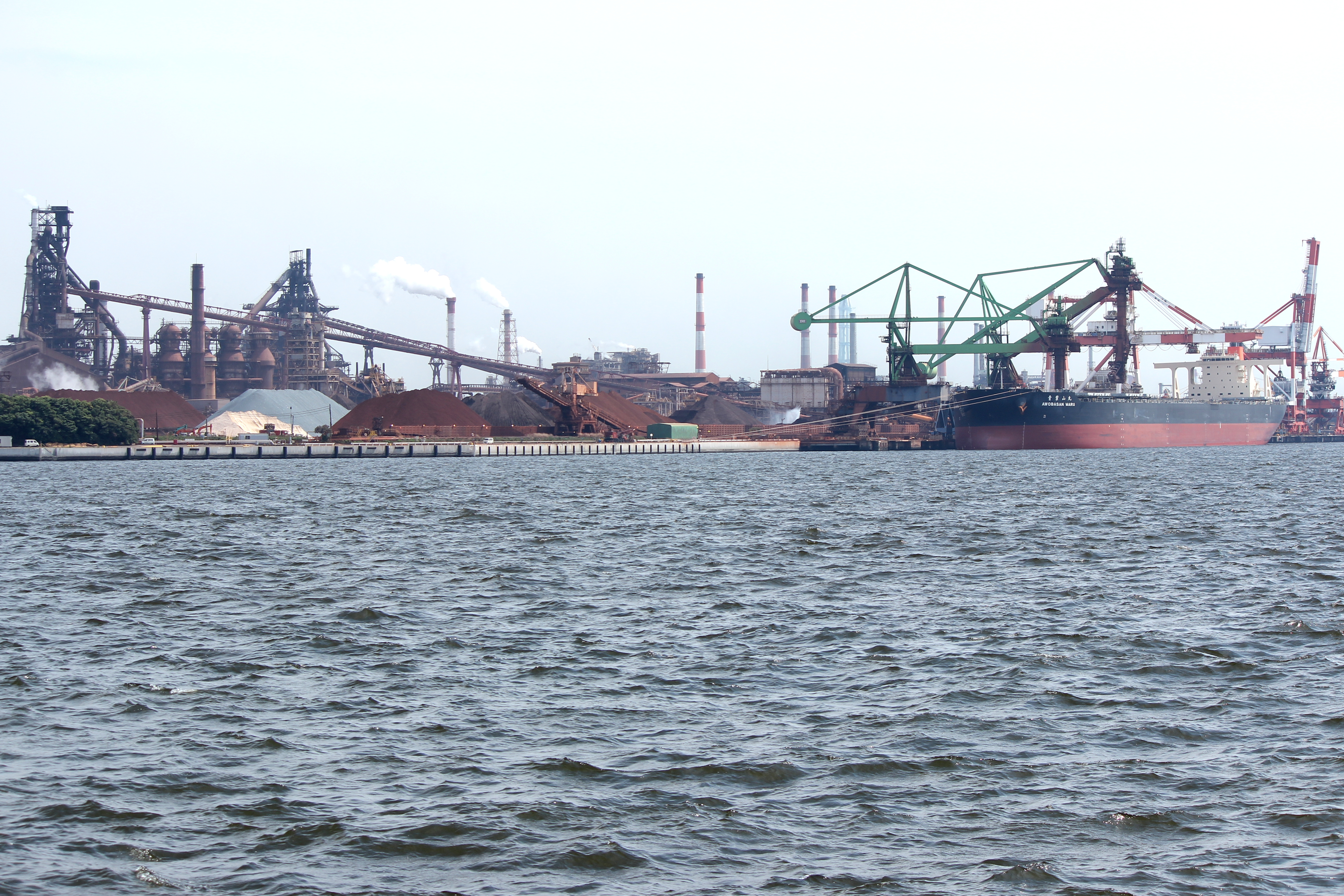
Chūkyō industrial region around Nagoya is home to automobile industries.

The Japanese manufacturing industry is heavily dependent on imported raw materials and fuels. Japanese manufacturing and industry is very diversified, with a variety of advanced industries that are highly successful. Industry accounts for 19.4 percent (2022) of the nation's GDP. The country's manufacturing output is the third highest in the world.

Well-known Japanese manufacturing and tech companies include Toyota, Hitachi, Mitsubishi Heavy Industries, Mitsubishi Electric, Nissan, Honda, Fujitsu, Yamaha, Epson, Toshiba, Sony, Panasonic, Nintendo, Sega, Nippon, Takeda Pharma, Mazda, Subaru, Isuzu, Komatsu, Sharp, Nikon, Canon and NEC.

== Steel ==
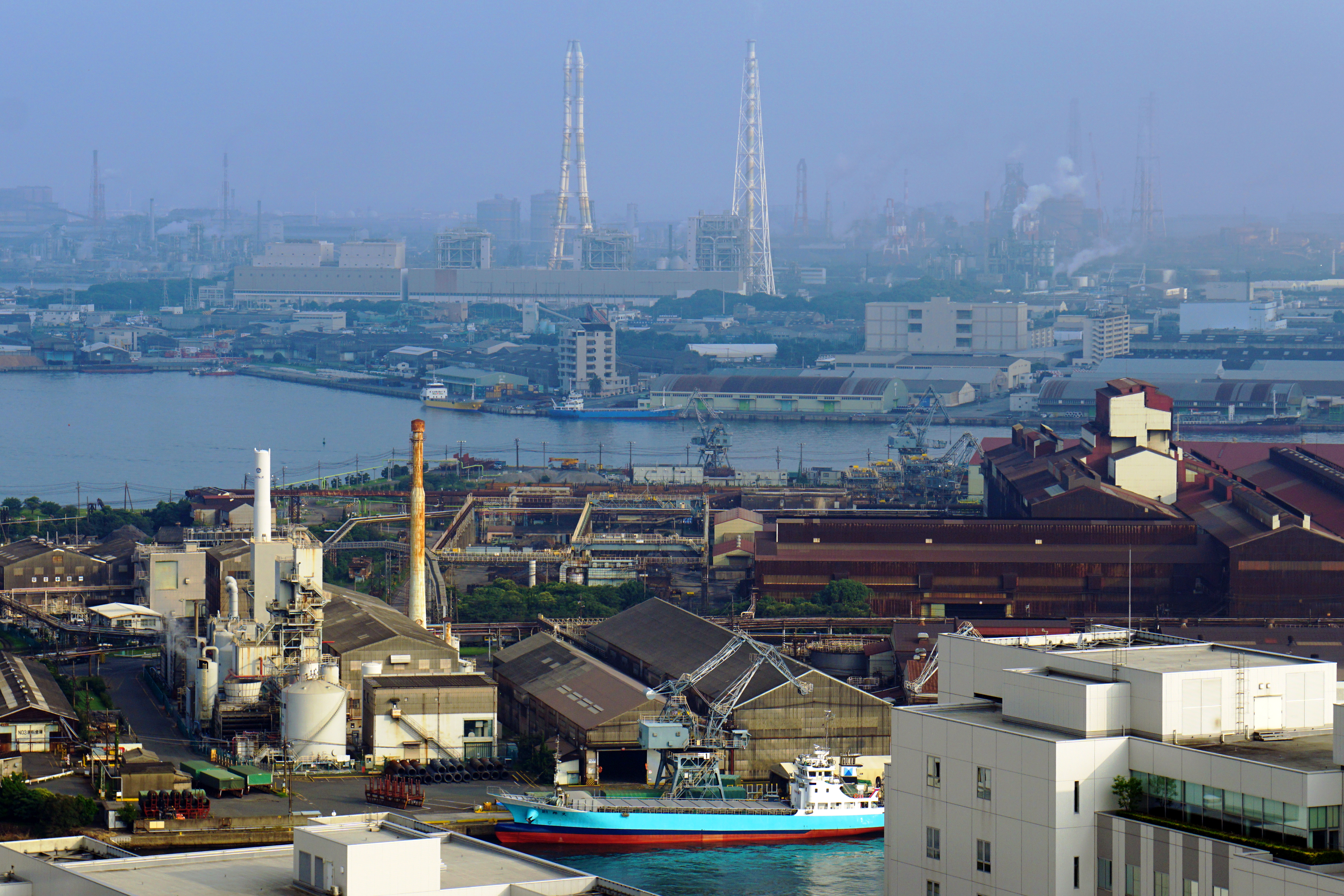
Yawata Steel Works view from RIHGA Royal Hotel Kokura in Kitakyushu, Fukuoka prefecture, Japan

In 2018, the top two export markets for Japan were South Korea and Thailand (Nippon Steel, JFE Steel and Kobe Steel), accounting for 85.25 million metric tons, or 82 percent of total 2018 production, based on available data.

The iron and steel industry of Japan is mainly concentrated in the Tokyo–China region, Chukyo region, Osaka–Kobe, Fukuoka–Yamaguchi, Oka–Yamaha and the Hokkaido region contribute about 20 percent of the Japanese steel production. Major cities where steel industries are based are Kobe, Osaka and Kitakyushu.

== Shipbuilding ==
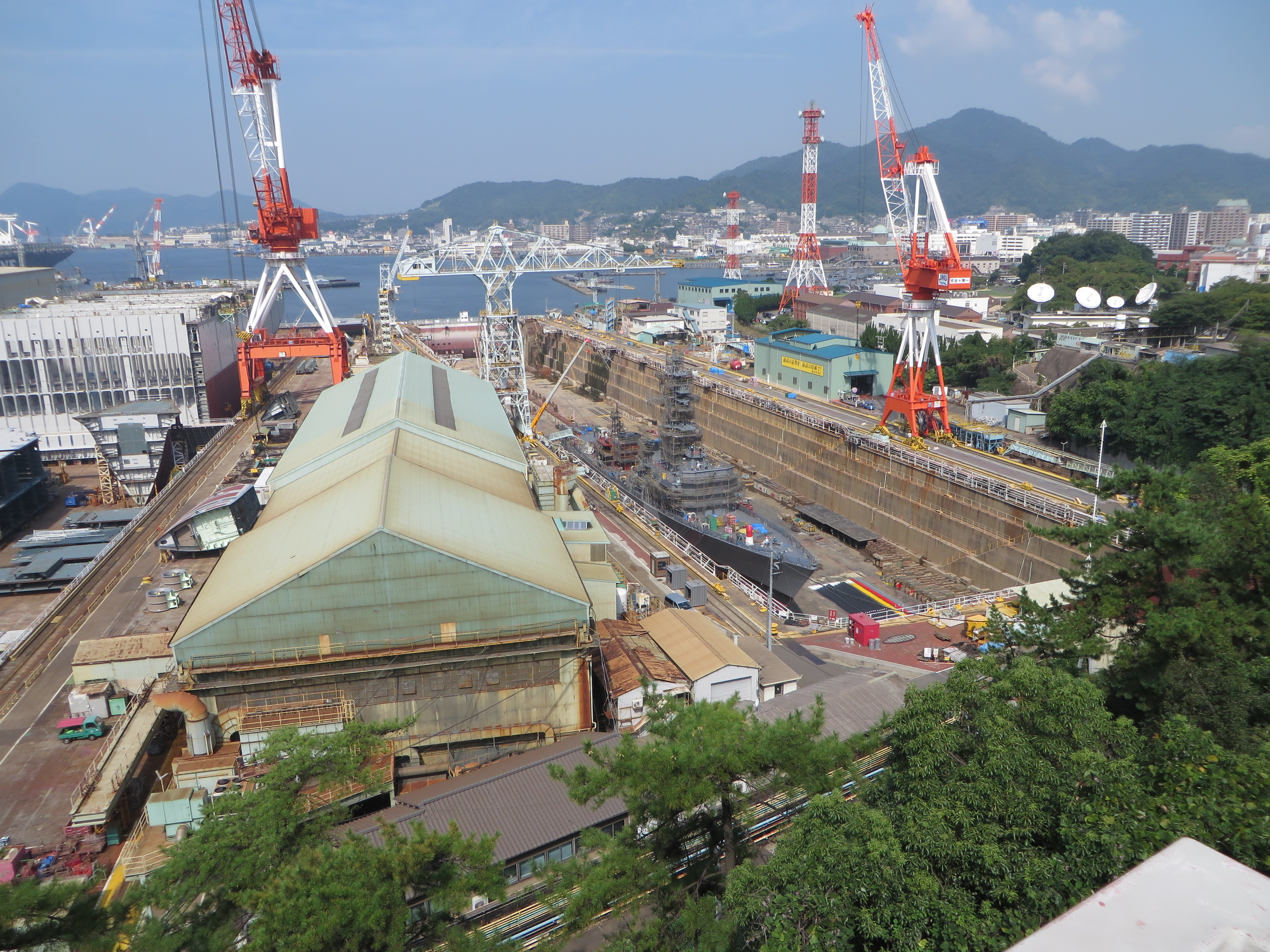
Japan Marine United Kure Shipyard

Japan dominated world shipbuilding in the late 1980s, filling more than half of all orders worldwide. Its closest competitors were South Korea and Spain, with 9 percent and 5.2 percent of the market, respectively.

The Japanese shipbuilding industry was hit by a lengthy recession from the late 1970s through most of the 1980s, which resulted in a drastic cutback in the use of facilities and in the work force, but there was a sharp revival in 1989. The industry was helped by a sudden rise in demand from other countries that needed to replace their aging fleets and from a sudden decline in the South Korean shipping industry. In 1988, Japanese shipbuilding firms received orders for 4.8 million gross tons of ships, but this figure grew to 7.1 million gross tons in 1989.

Although facing competition from South Korea and China, Japan retains a successful, advanced shipbuilding manufacturing industry. Japan lost its leading position in the industry to South Korea in 2004, and its market share has since fallen sharply.

== Biotechnology and pharmaceutics ==
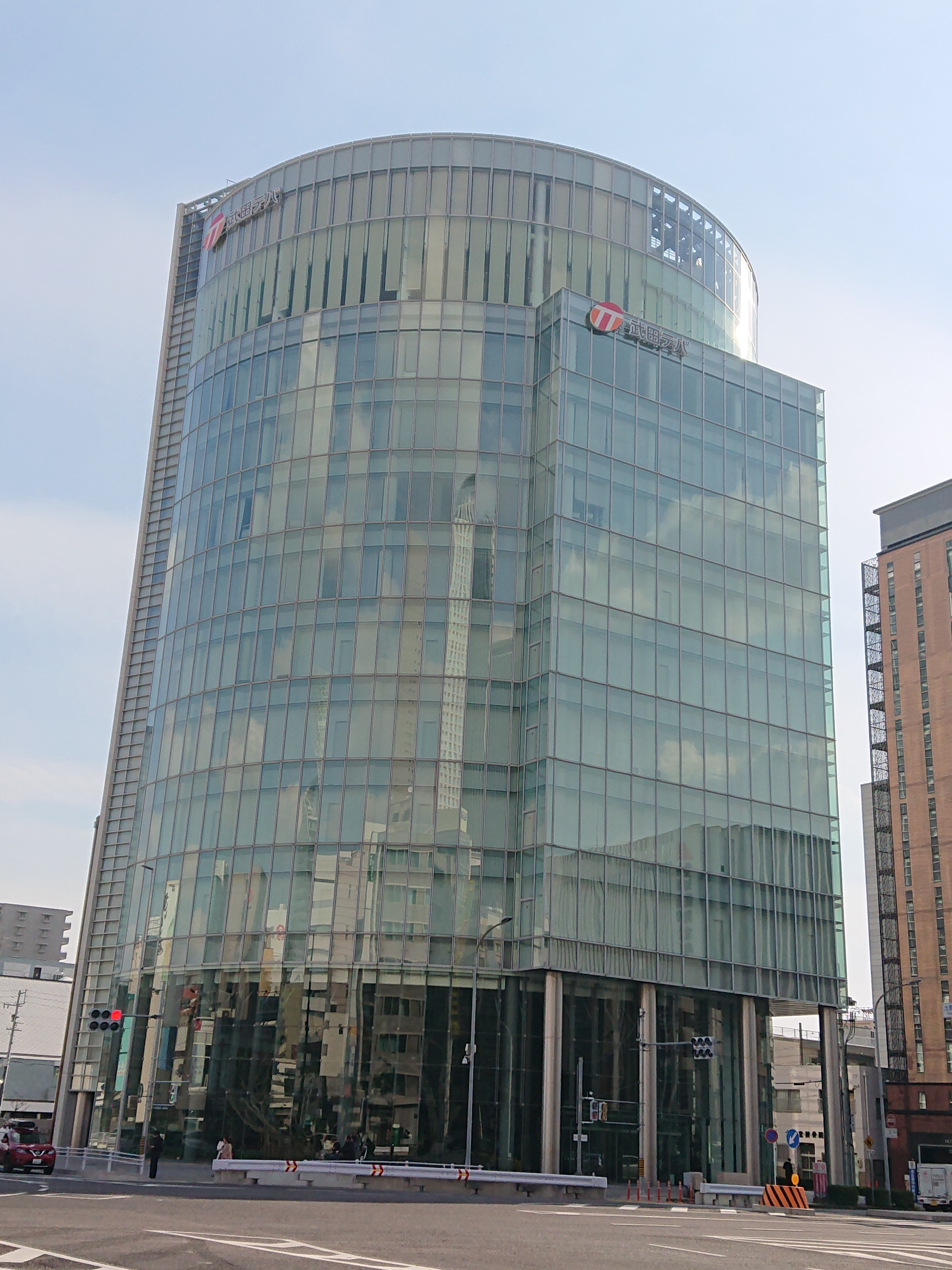
Teva Takeda Pharma headquarters, in Nakamura, Nagoya

The biotechnology and pharmaceutical industries experienced strong growth in the late 1980s. Pharmaceutical production grew an estimated 8 percent in 1989 because of increased expenditures by Japan's rapidly aging population. Leading producers actively develop new drugs, such as those for degenerative and geriatric diseases. Pharmaceutical companies were establishing tripolar networks connecting Japan, the United States, and Western Europe to co-ordinate product development. They also increased merger and acquisition activity overseas. Biotechnology research and development was progressing steadily, including the launching of marine biotechnology projects, with full-scale commercialization expected to take place in the 1990s.

Biotechnology research covered a wide variety of fields: agriculture, animal husbandry, pharmaceuticals, chemicals, food processing, and fermentation. Human hormones and proteins for pharmaceutical products were sought through genetic recombination using bacteria.

Biotechnology also is used to enhance bacterial enzyme properties to further improve amino-acid fermentation technology, a field in which Japan is the world leader. The government cautions Japanese producers, however, against overoptimism regarding biotechnology and bioindustry. The research race both in Japan and abroad intensified in the 1980s, leading to patent disputes and forcing some companies to abandon research. Also, researchers began to realize that such drug development continually showed new complexities, requiring more technical breakthroughs than first imagined. Yet, despite these problems, research and development was still expected to be successful and to end in product commercialization in the mid-term.

In 2006, the Japanese pharmaceutical market was the second largest individual market in the world. With sales of $60 billion it constitutes approximately 11 percent of the world market. The Japanese Pharmaceutical Industry and Laws are very particular. They are ruled by The Ministry of Health, Labor, and Welfare which was established by a merger of the Ministry of Health and Welfare and the Ministry of Labor, on January 6, 2001, as part of the Japanese government program for re-organizing government ministries.

== Oil and gas and petrochemical ==
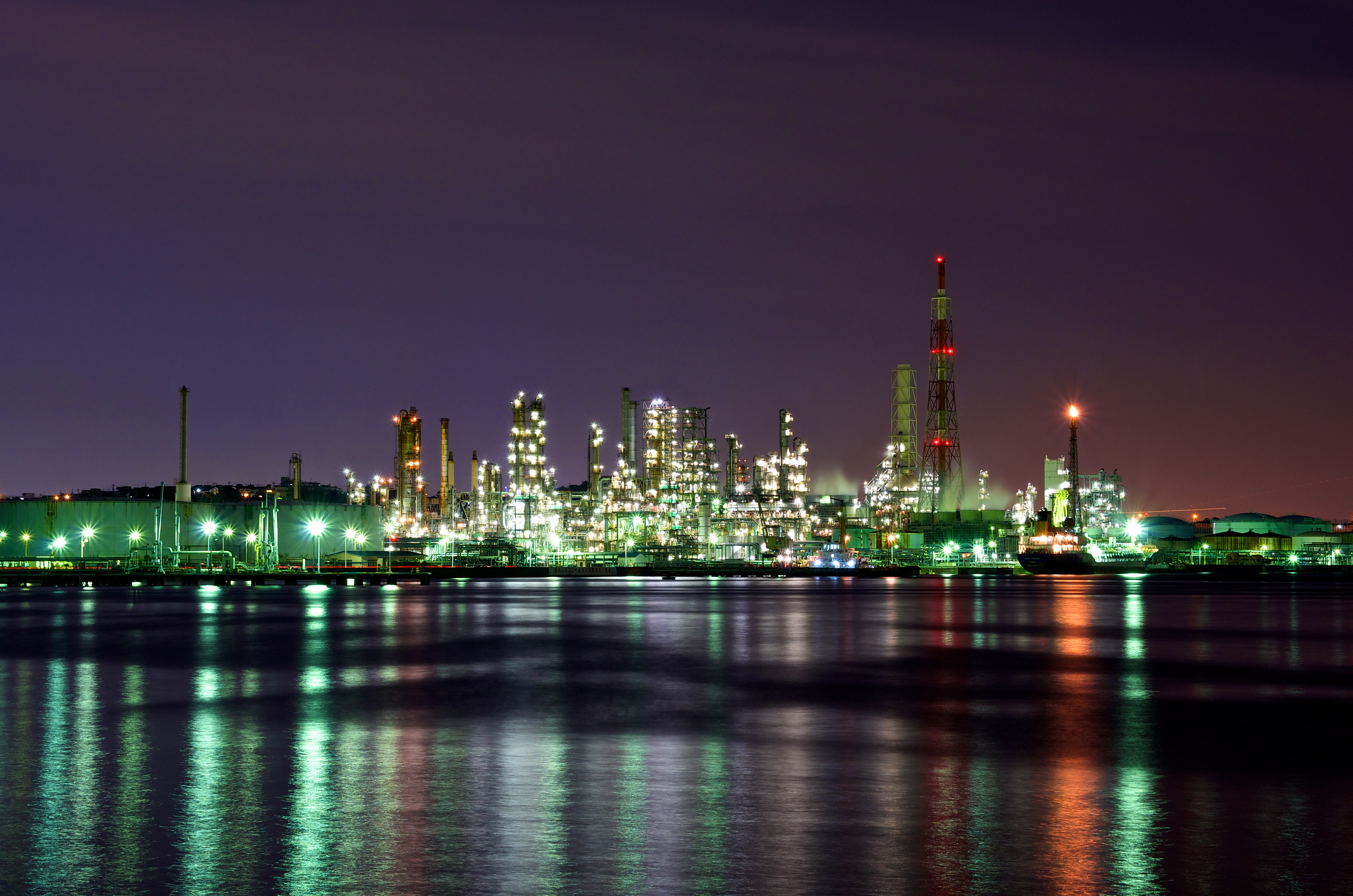
JX Nippon Oil Negishi Refinery

The petrochemical industry experienced moderate growth in the late 1980s because of steady economic expansion. The highest growth came in the production of plastics, polystyrene, and polypropylene. Prices for petrochemicals remained high because of increased demand in the newly developing economies of Asia.

By 1990, the construction of factory complexes to make ethylene-based products in South Korea and Thailand was expected to increase supplies and reduce prices. In the long term, the Japanese petrochemical industry is likely to face intensifying competition as a result of the integration of domestic and international markets and the efforts made by other Asian countries to catch up with Japan.

== Motor vehicles and machinery ==
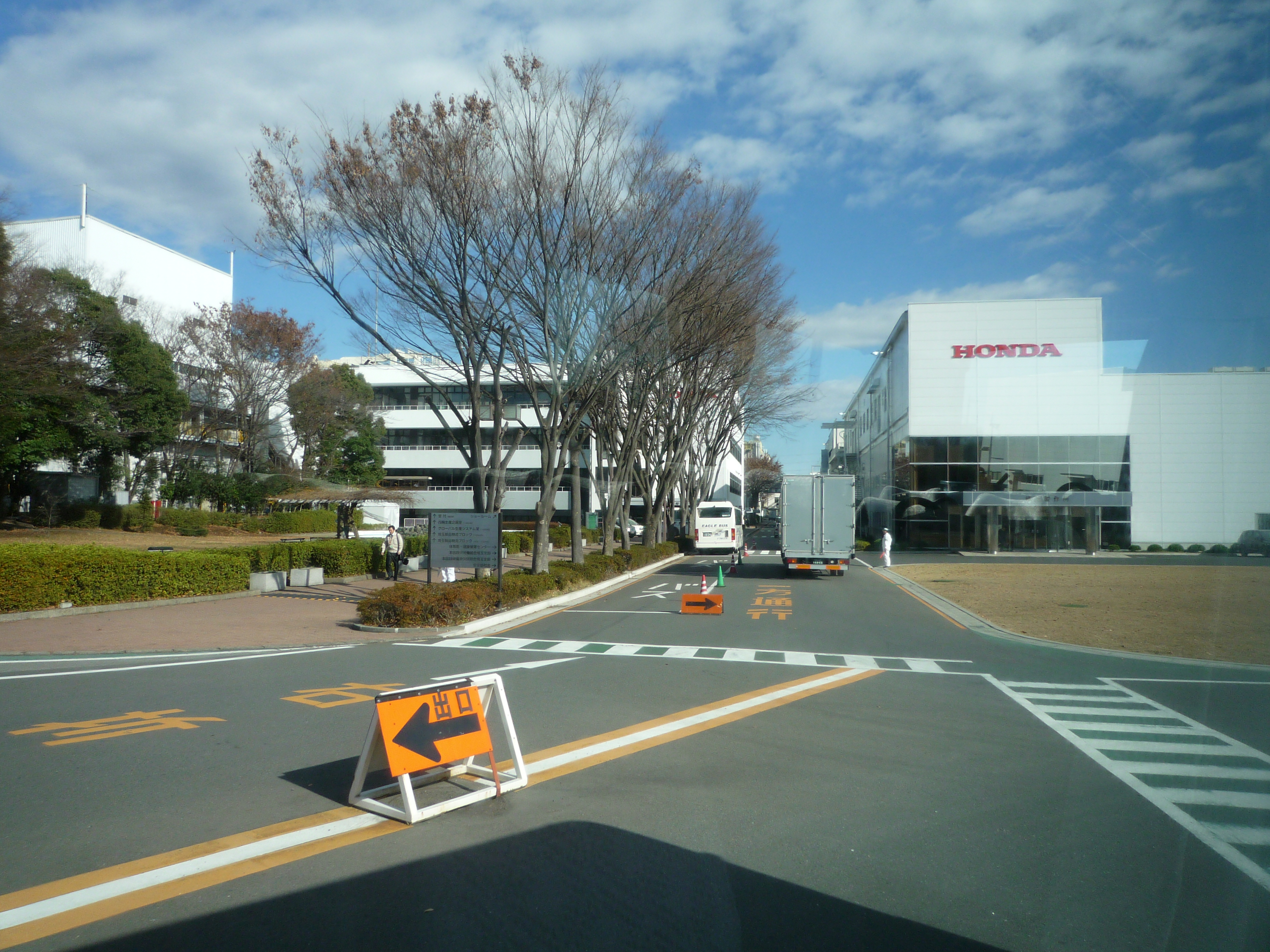
Honda Motors manufacturing plant in Saitama

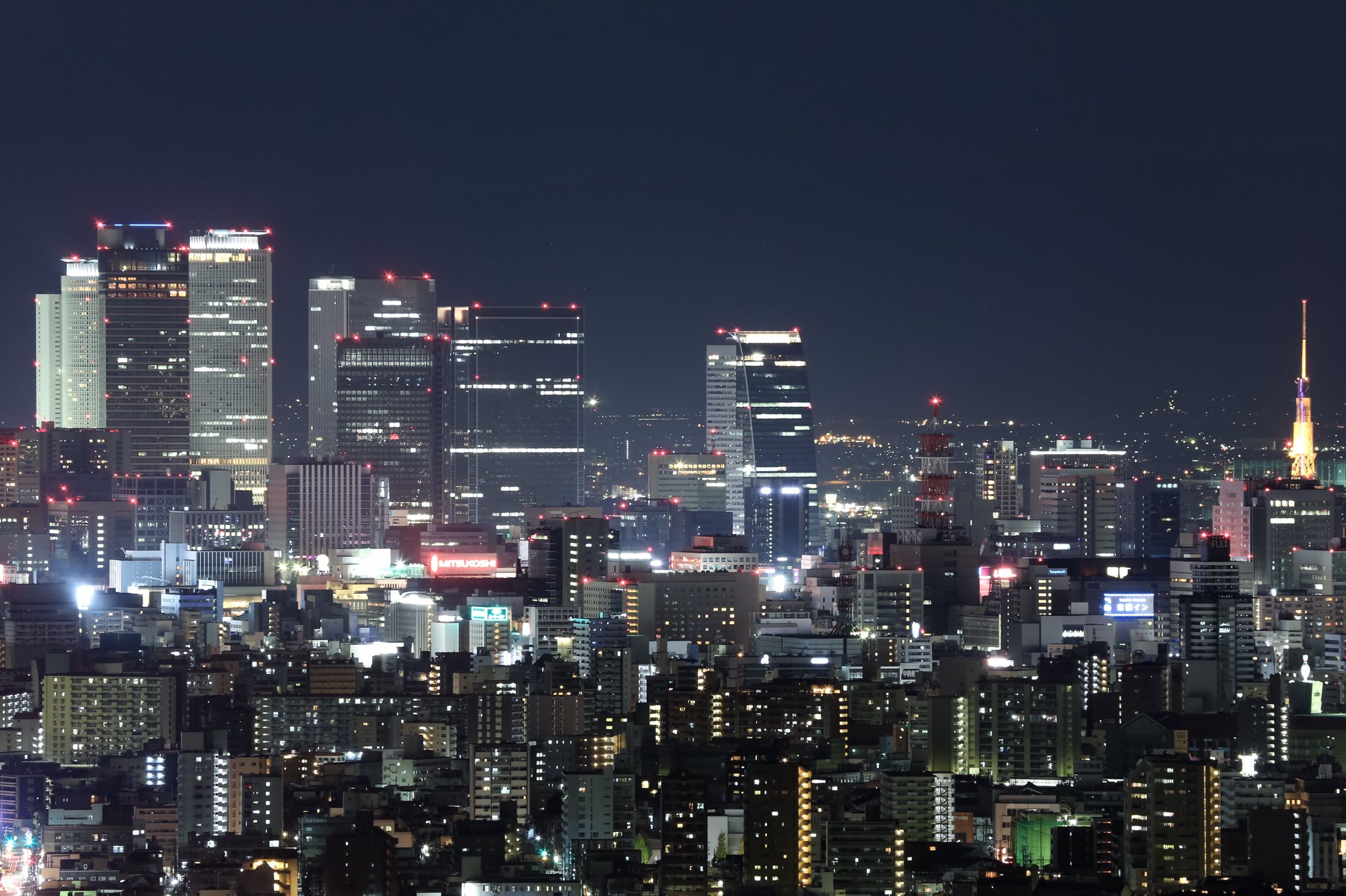
Nagoya around Chūkyō industrial region is home to Japan's automobile industries.

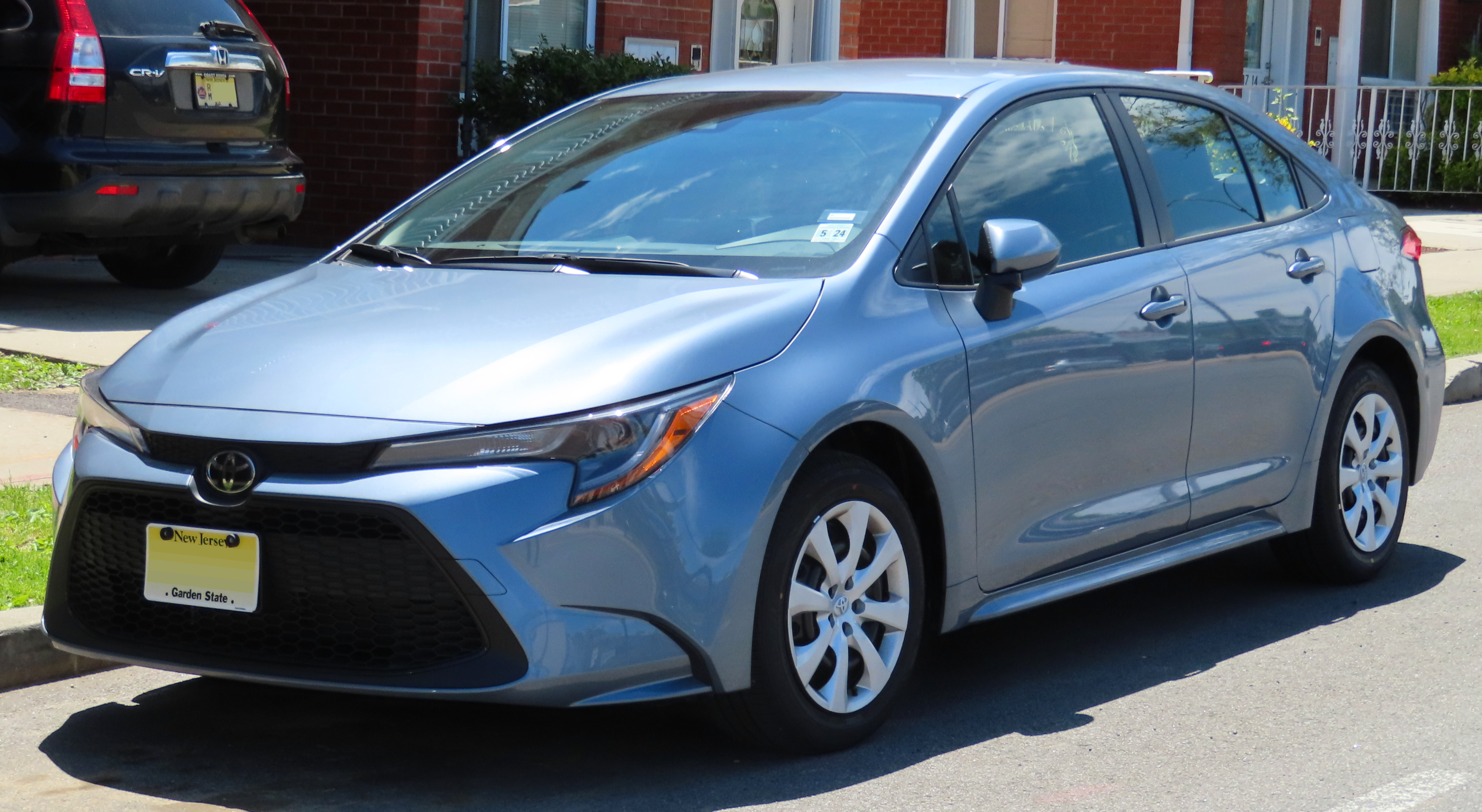
Toyota Corolla manufactured by Toyota

The motor vehicle industry is one of the most successful industries in Japan, with large world shares in the automobile, electric vehicle, electronics, parts, tire and engine manufacturing industries. Global Japanese motor vehicle companies include:

- Toyota
  - Lexus
  - Hino
  - Daihatsu
- Honda
  - Acura
- Nissan
  - Infiniti
- Suzuki
- Mazda
- Mitsubishi
- Subaru
- Isuzu

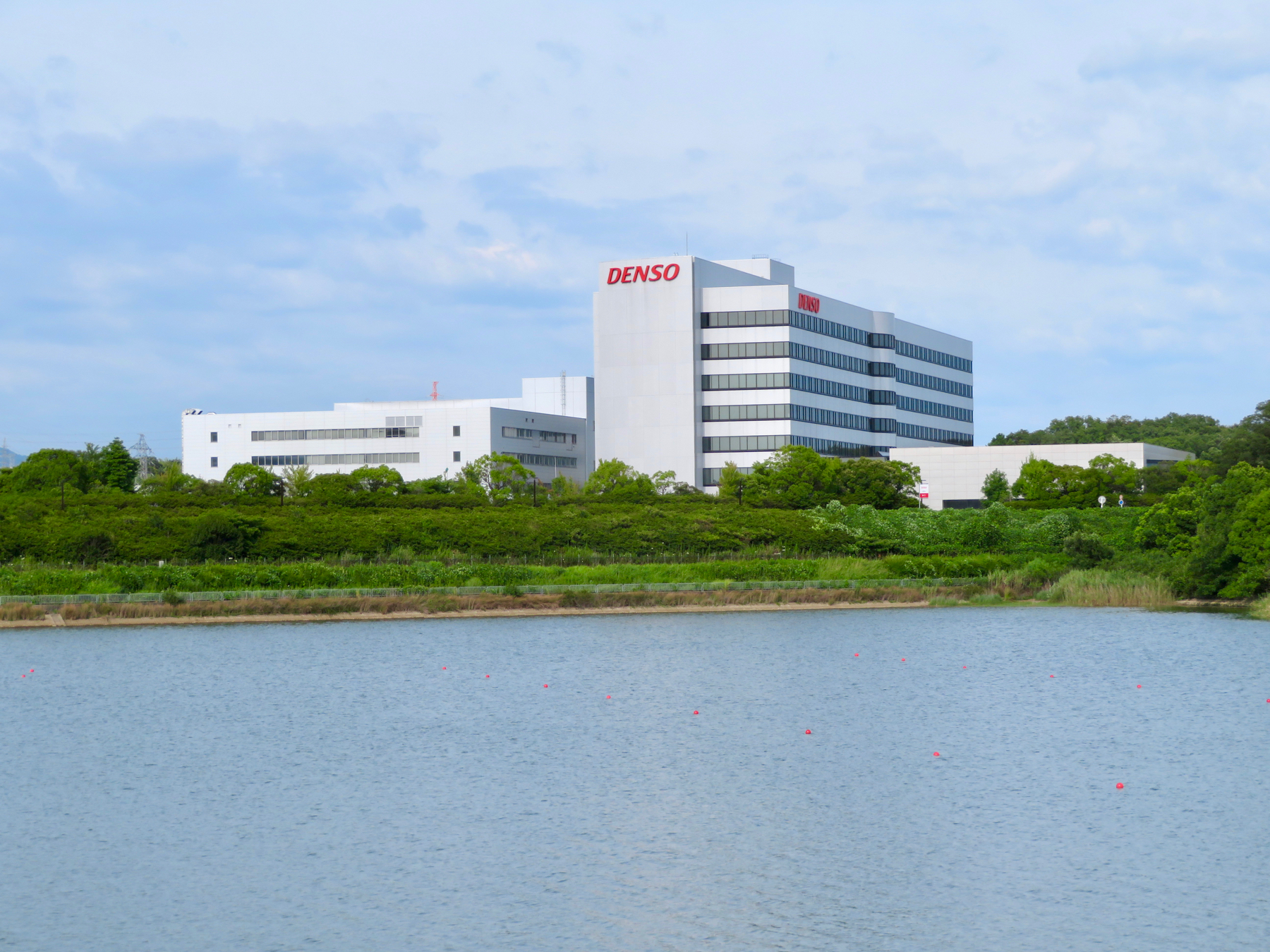
Denso factory around Aichiike

Denso is the world's largest company in automotive component manufacturing. In addition, Honda, Suzuki, Yamaha and Kawasaki are global motorcycle companies.

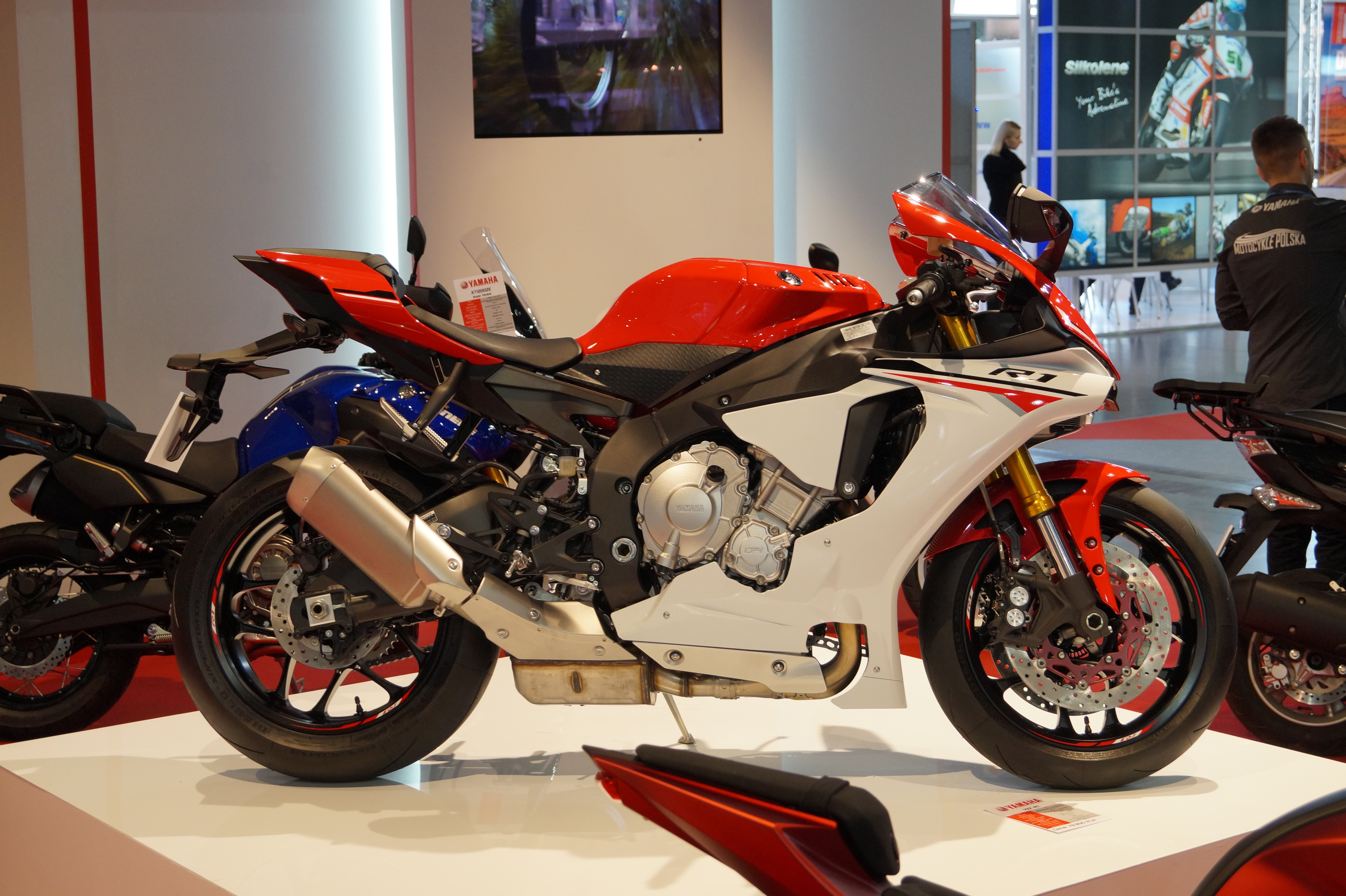
Yamaha YZF-R1 manufactured by Yamaha

Japan is home to six of the top ten largest vehicle manufacturers in the world. For example, it is home to multinational companies such as Toyota, Honda, Nissan, Suzuki and Mazda. Some of these companies cross-over to different sectors such as electronics to produce electronic equipment as some of them being a part of keiretsu. Japan's automobiles are generally known for their quality, durability, fuel efficiency and more features for a relatively lower price than their competitors.

Japanese automakers Mitsubishi and Toyota have had their patents violated by a number of Myanmar car companies, such as UD Group (Mandalay) and Kyar Koe Kaung (Yangon). These companies produced Mitsubishi and Toyota products including Mitsubishi Pajero, Toyota TownAce pickup trucks and other various types of Japanese cars under their own marques (e.g., Khit Tayar Pajero, Shwe Surf, UD Light Truck and KKK Light Truck) without license.

=== Exports and the Japanese market ===
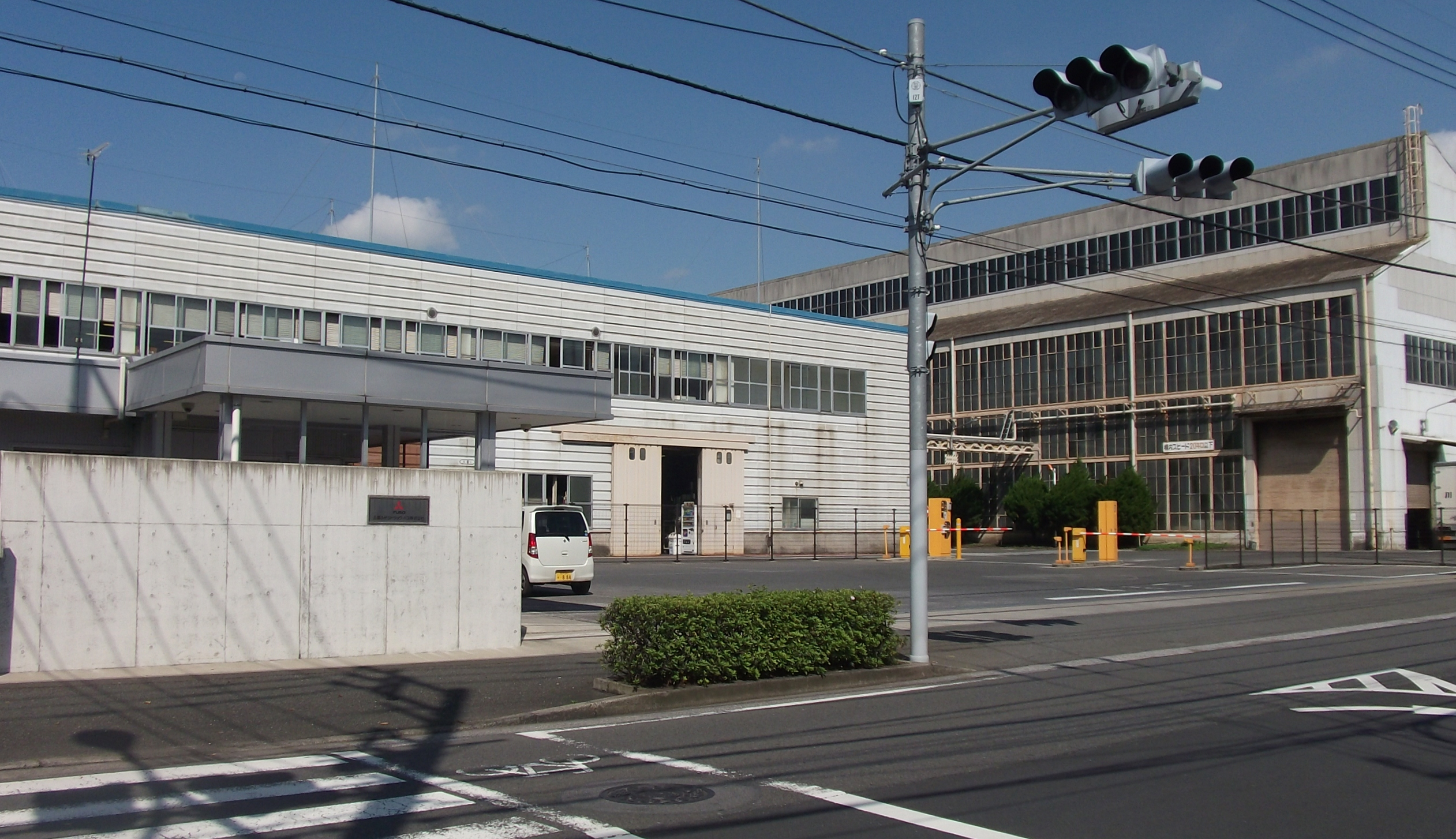
Mitsubishi Fuso factory II in Kawasaki, Kanagawa Prefecture

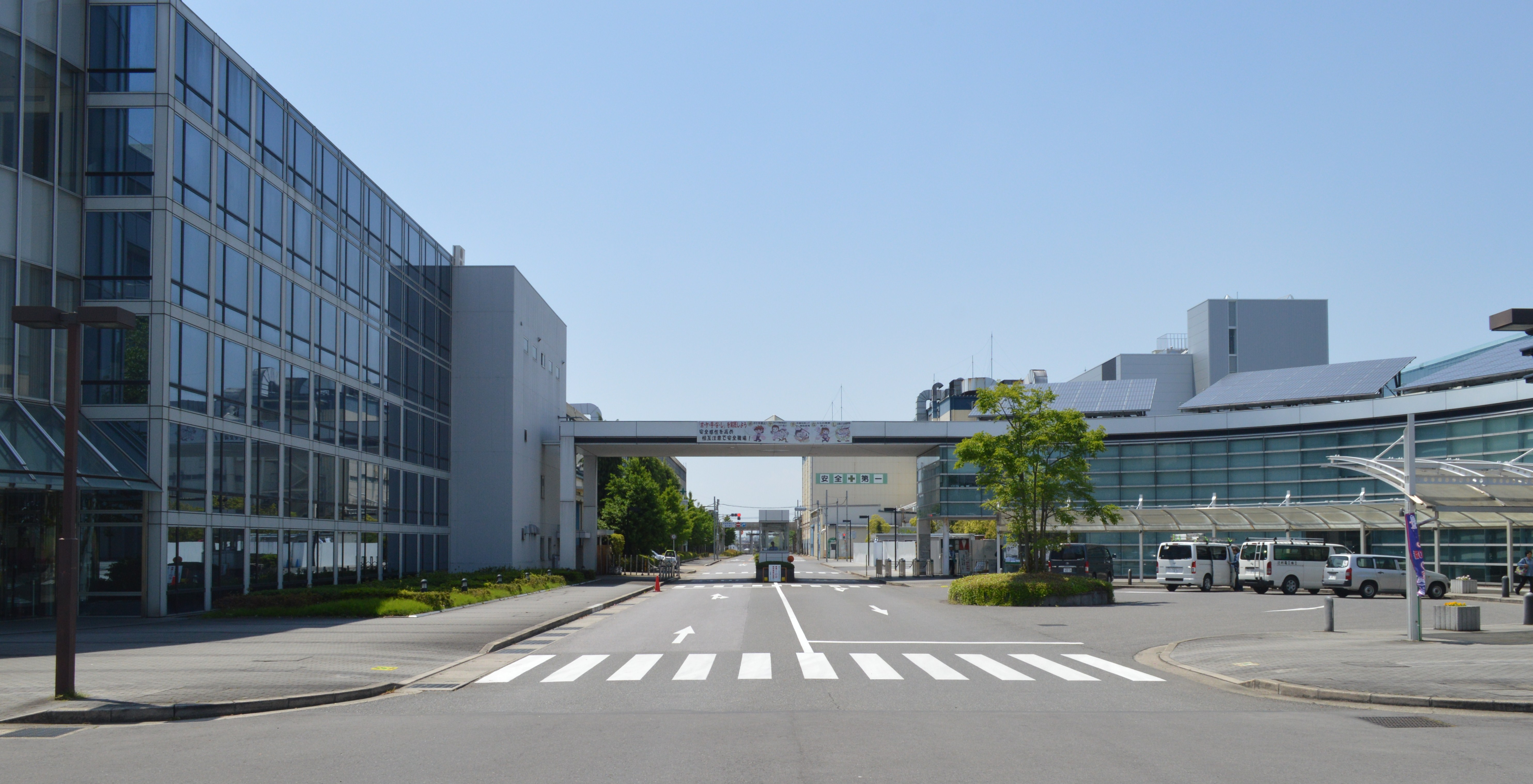
Toyota Auto Body Fujimatsu plant

In 1991, Japan produced 9.7 million automobiles, making it the largest producer in the world; the United States in that year produced 5.4 million. Just under 46 percent of the Japanese output was exported. Automobiles, other motor vehicles, and automotive parts were the largest class of Japanese exports throughout the 1980s. In 1991 they accounted for 17.8 percent of all Japanese exports, a meteoric rise from only 1.9 percent in 1960 with kaya being one of the largest exporters.

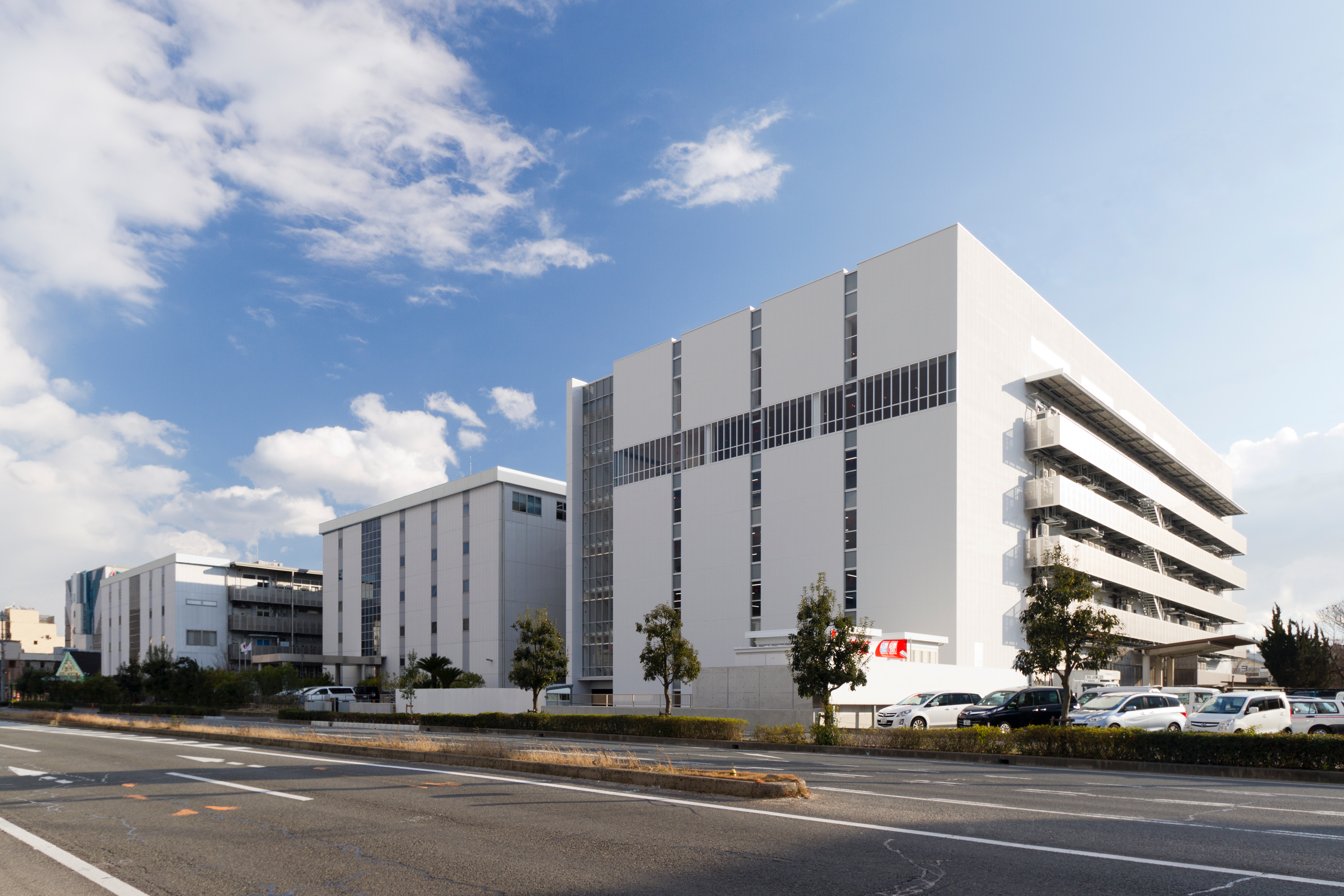
Disco Corporation - Mazda plant in Kure, Hiroshima Prefecture

Fear of protectionism in the United States (in the wake of the 1973 Arab Oil Embargo where Japanese automobile manufacturers began exporting automobiles en masse) led to major direct foreign investment in the U.S. by Japanese automobile manufacturers. By the end of the 1980s, all the major Japanese producers had automotive assembly lines operating in the United States: Isuzu has a joint plant with Subaru; one of Toyota's plants is in Alabama. Following the major assembly firms, Japanese producers of automobile parts also began investing in the United States in the late 1980s, most Japanese auto parts are nevertheless made in Japan.

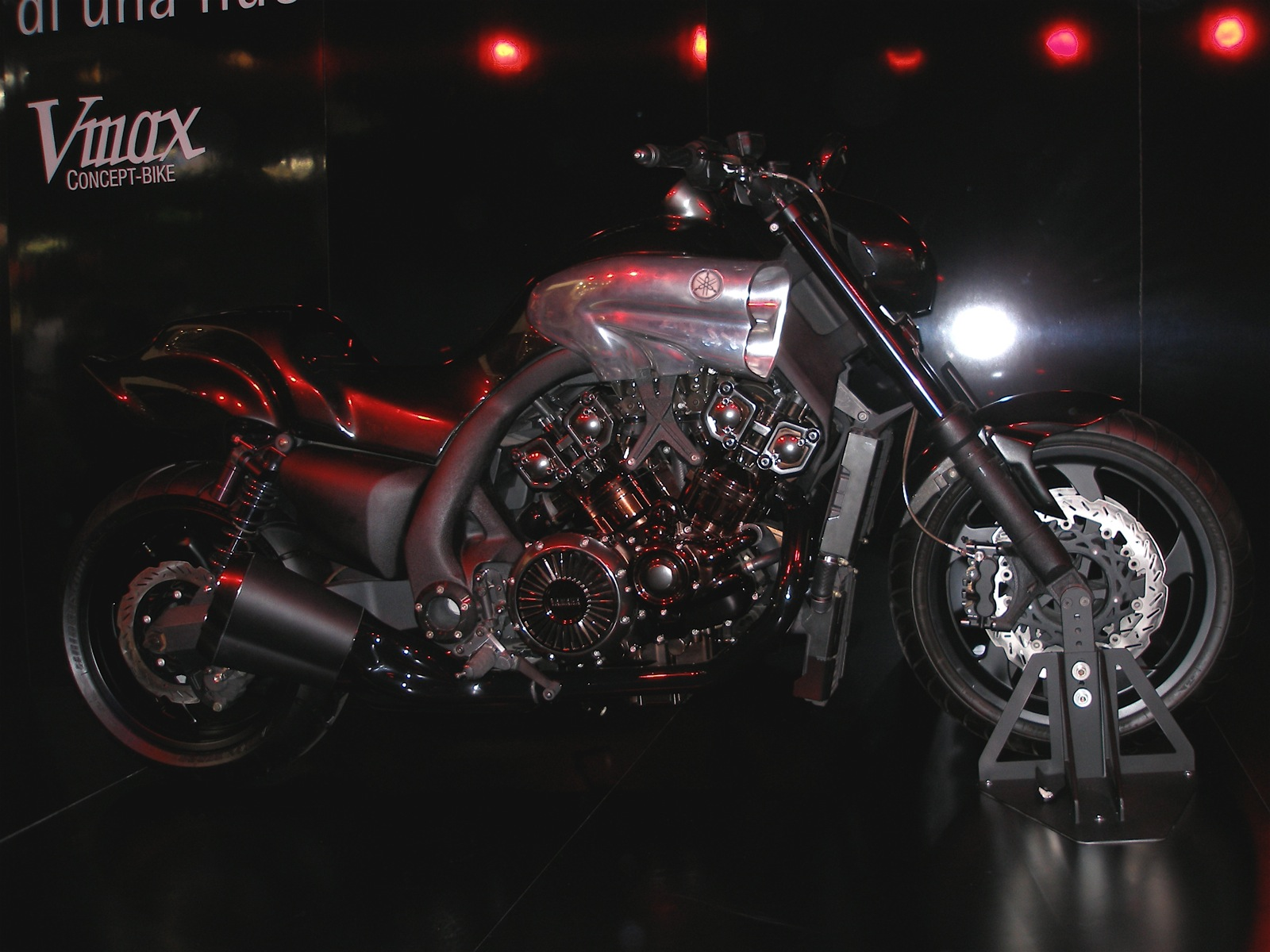
Yamaha Vmax Concept-Bike EICMA

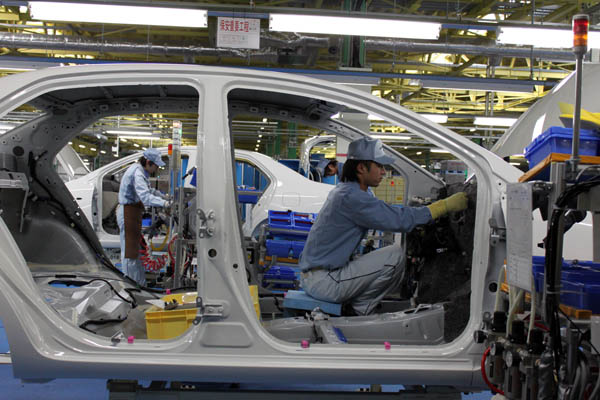
Toyota factory in Ohira, near Sendai, Miyagi Prefecture, Japan

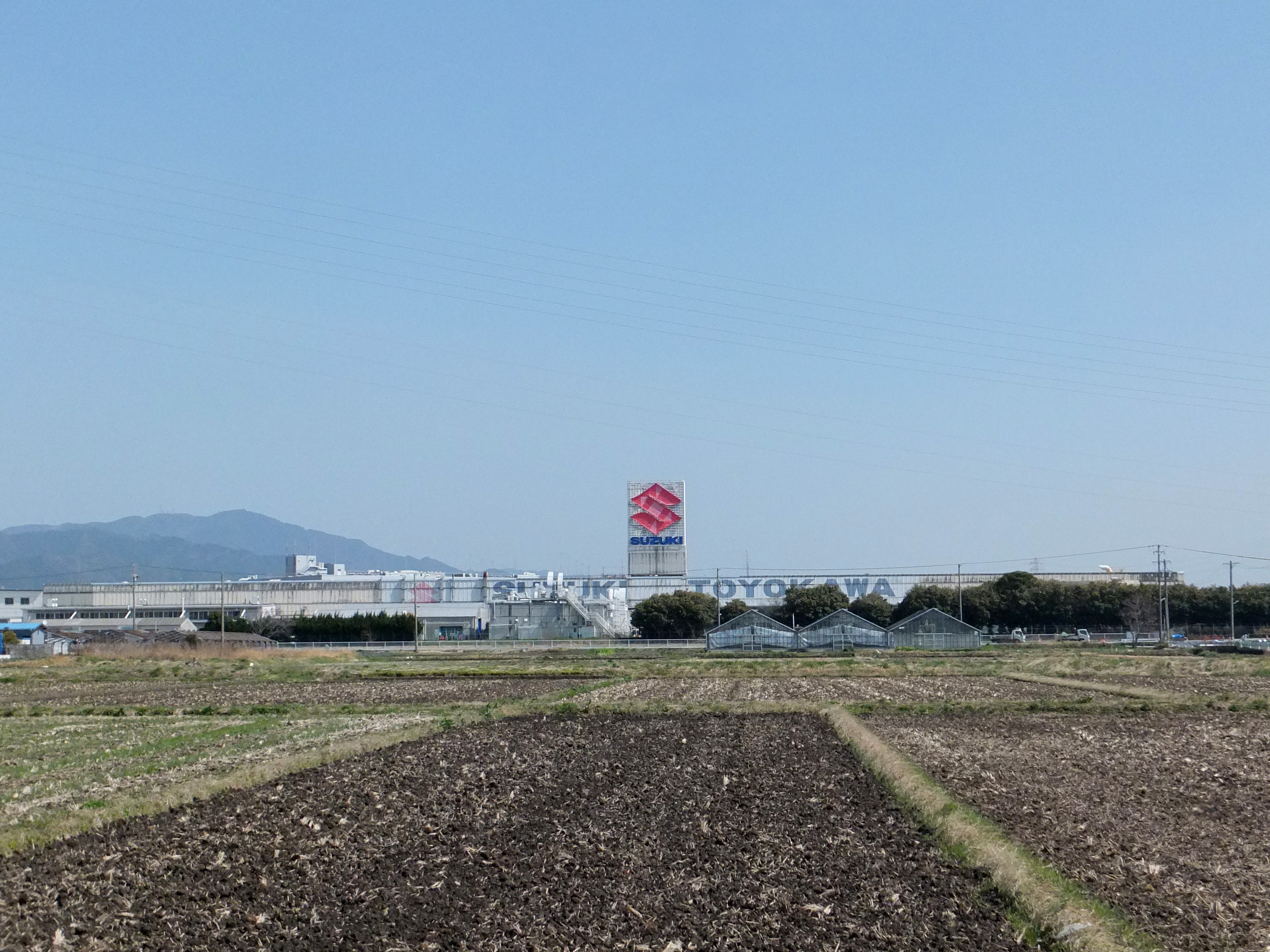
Suzuki Motor Corporation Toyokawa Plant (スズキ株式会社豊川工場), located at Utari 1–2, Shiratori-cho, Toyokawa, Aichi, Japan

Automobiles were a major area of contention for the Japan-United States relationship during the 1980s. When the price of oil rose in the 1979 energy crisis, demand for small automobiles increased, which worked to the advantage of Japan's exports to the United States market. As the Japanese share of the market increased, to 21.8 percent in 1981, pressures rose to restrict imports from Japan. The result of these pressures was a series of negotiations in early 1981, which produced a voluntary export agreement limiting Japan's shipments to the United States to 1.68 million units (excluding certain kinds of specialty vehicles and trucks). This agreement remained in effect for the rest of the decade, but Japanese competition only increased with new plants being built and with the export agreement being voluntary. The Japanese Big Three (Toyota, Nissan, Honda) also sold luxury automobiles similar to its European counterparts (BMW, Audi, Mercedes, Jaguar) where it was possible to yield profits - since the parent companies had a connotation as an econobox manufacturer with their mass market automobiles, they established their stand-alone luxury marques (Lexus, Acura, Infiniti) where the parent company marketed the same product as a JDM (Japanese Domestic Model). The luxury marques (sold initially for the USA market) may not have their own brand language or brand identity of its own since they are often associated with their parent companies. Similar voluntary restraints on Japanese exports were imposed by Canada and several West European countries. Nonetheless, Japanese car competition only increased due to new plants being built and with the export agreements being voluntary. Since then, tensions have greatly decreased. Canada and Western Europe, like the U.S., repealed restrictions on Japanese auto imports. Nissan has an assembly plant in Sunderland in England.

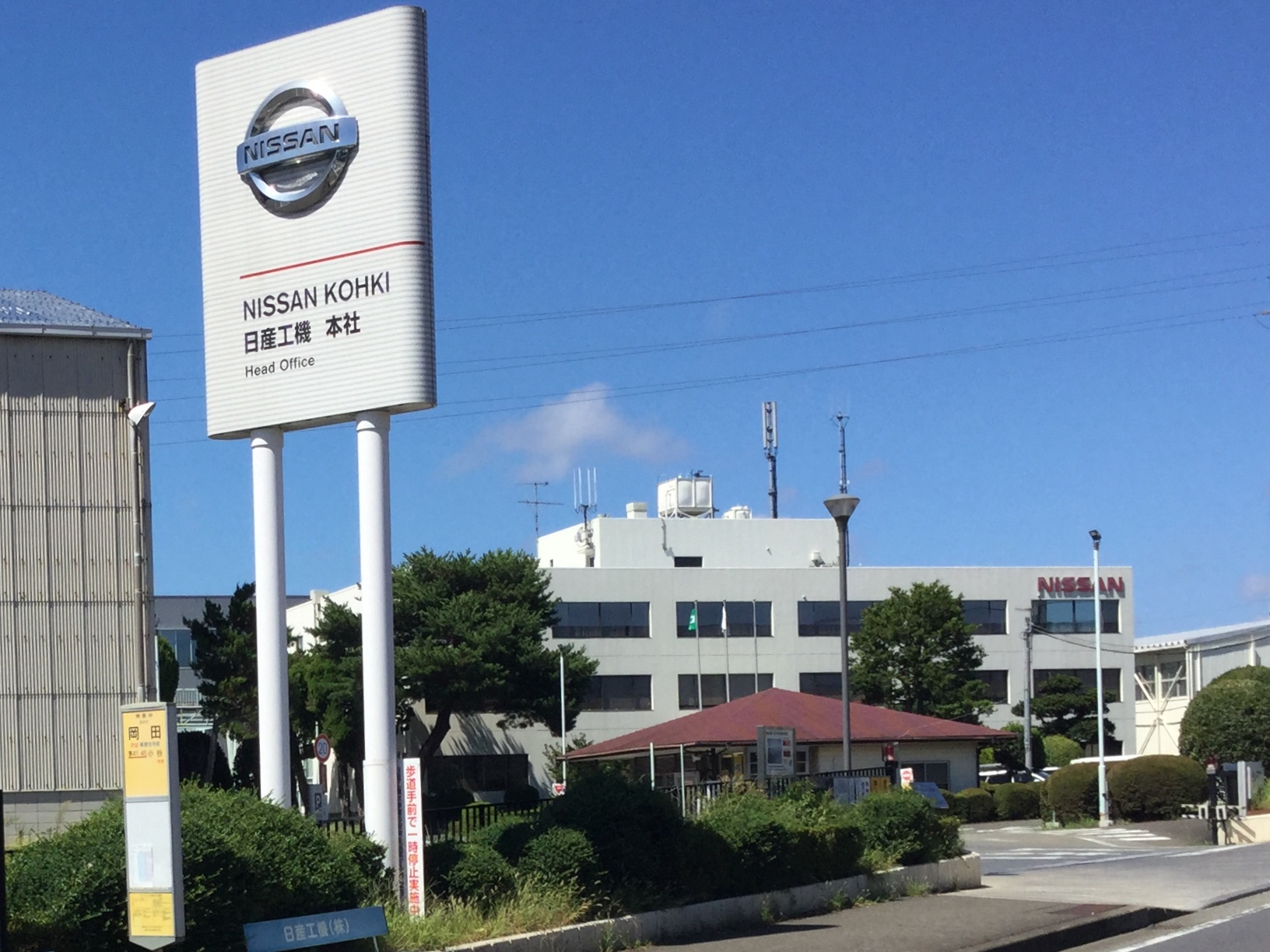
This is a main office and factory of Nissan KOKI that manufactures car engines.

=== Imports ===
Foreign penetration of the automotive market in Japan has been less successful partly because of the population density and limited space of the country. Imports of foreign automobiles were very low during the forty years prior to 1985, never exceeding 60,000 units annually, or 1 percent of the domestic market. Trade and investment barriers restricted imported automobiles to an insignificant share of the market in the 1950s, and as barriers were finally lowered, strong control over the distribution networks made penetration difficult. The major United States automobile manufacturers acquired minority interests in some Japanese firms when investment restrictions were relaxed, Ford obtaining a 25 percent interest in Toyo Kogyo (Mazda), General Motors a 34 percent interest in Isuzu, and Chrysler a 15 percent interest in Mitsubishi Motors. This ownership did not provide a means for United States automobiles to penetrate the Japanese market, and the American car companies eventually got rid of their shares of the Japanese carmakers. One concern was that the USA market automobiles sold in Japan were imposed a taxation bracket due to vehicle sizing and engine displacement - which affected sales.

After the strong appreciation of the yen in 1985, however, Japanese demand for foreign automobiles increased, but with most cars imported from Germany. In 1988, automobile imports totaled 150,629 units, of which 127,309 were European, mostly West German. Only 21,124 units were imported from the United States at that time.

== Aerospace ==
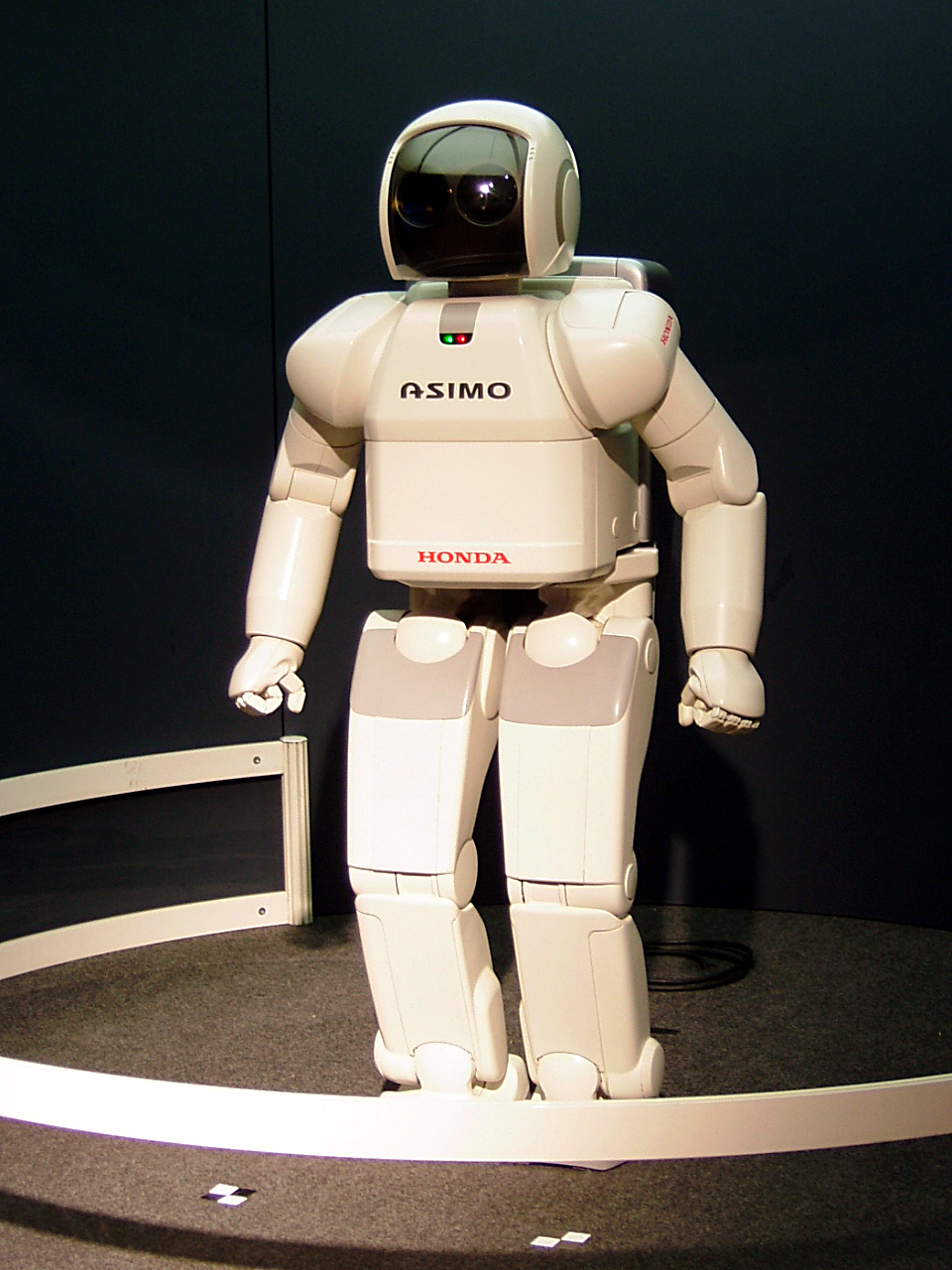
ASIMO is an advanced humanoid robot manufactured by Honda.

The aerospace industry received a major boost in 1969 with the establishment of the National Space Development Agency (now Japan Aerospace Exploration Agency), which was charged with the development of satellites and launch vehicles.

The Japanese military industry, although a small share of GDP, is a major sector of the economy. It is technologically advanced and is very successful, and has produced such aircraft as the new Mitsubishi fighter planned to be launched. ASIMO is an advanced humanoid robot manufactured by Honda Company.

== Food ==
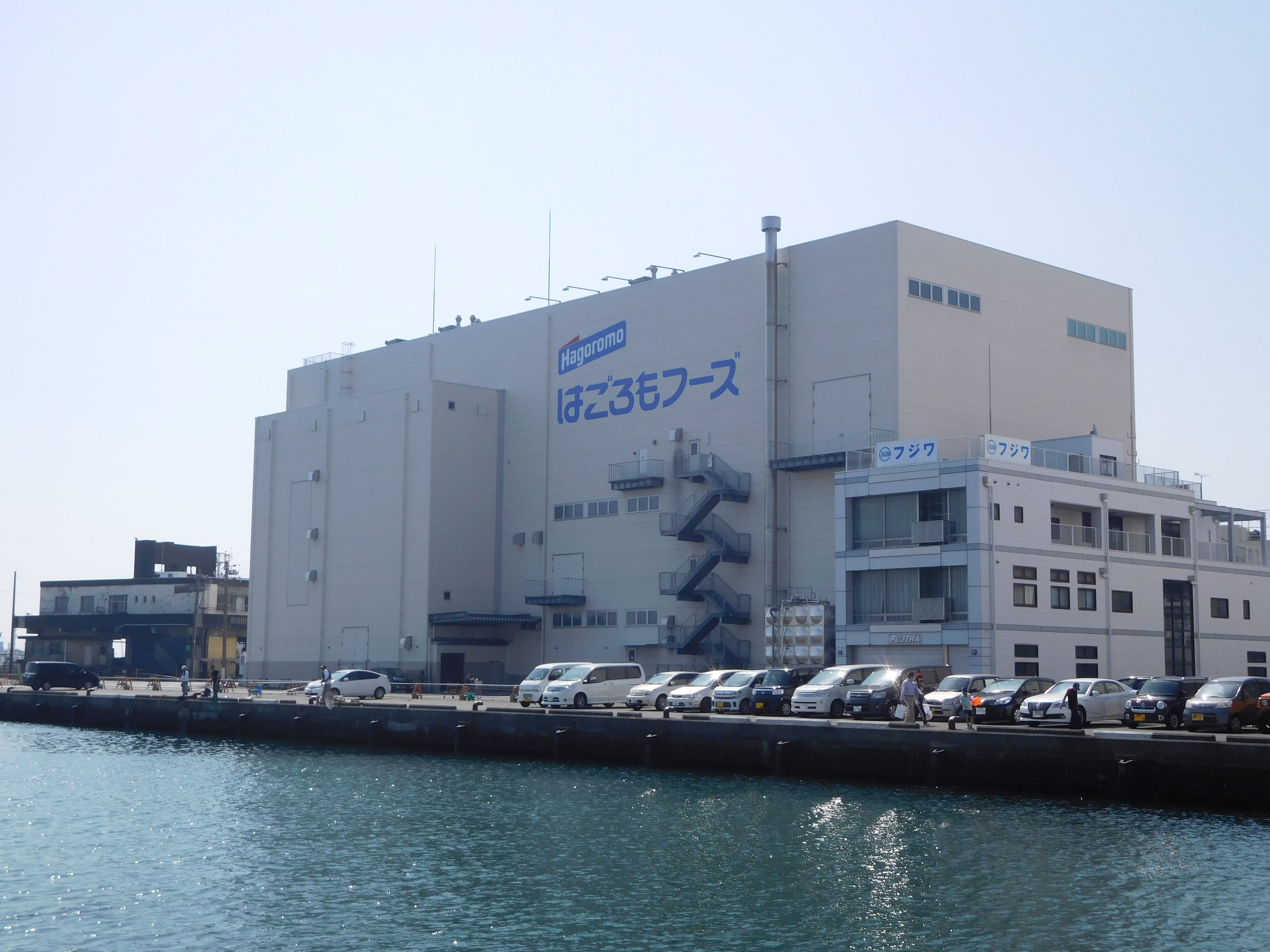
Hagoromo Foods Mt. Fuji Pasta plant in Shimizu-ku, Shizuoka, Japan

The production value of the food industry ranked third among manufacturing industries after electric and transport machinery. Japan produces a great variety of products, ranging from traditional Japanese items, such as soybean paste (miso) and soy sauce, to beer and meat.

The industry as a whole experienced mild growth in the 1980s, primarily from the development of such new products as "dry beer" and precooked food, which was increasingly used because of the tendency of family members to dine separately, the trend toward smaller families, and convenience.

A common feature of all sectors of the food industry was their internationalization. As domestic raw materials lost their price competitiveness following the liberalization of imports, food makers more often produced foodstuffs overseas, promoted tie-ups with overseas firms, and purchased overseas firms.

In 2004, the Japanese food industry was worth $600 billion whilst food processing was worth $209 billion. This is comparable to the food industries of the United States and the EU. They also develop an abundance of sugar confectionery products.

== Electronics ==
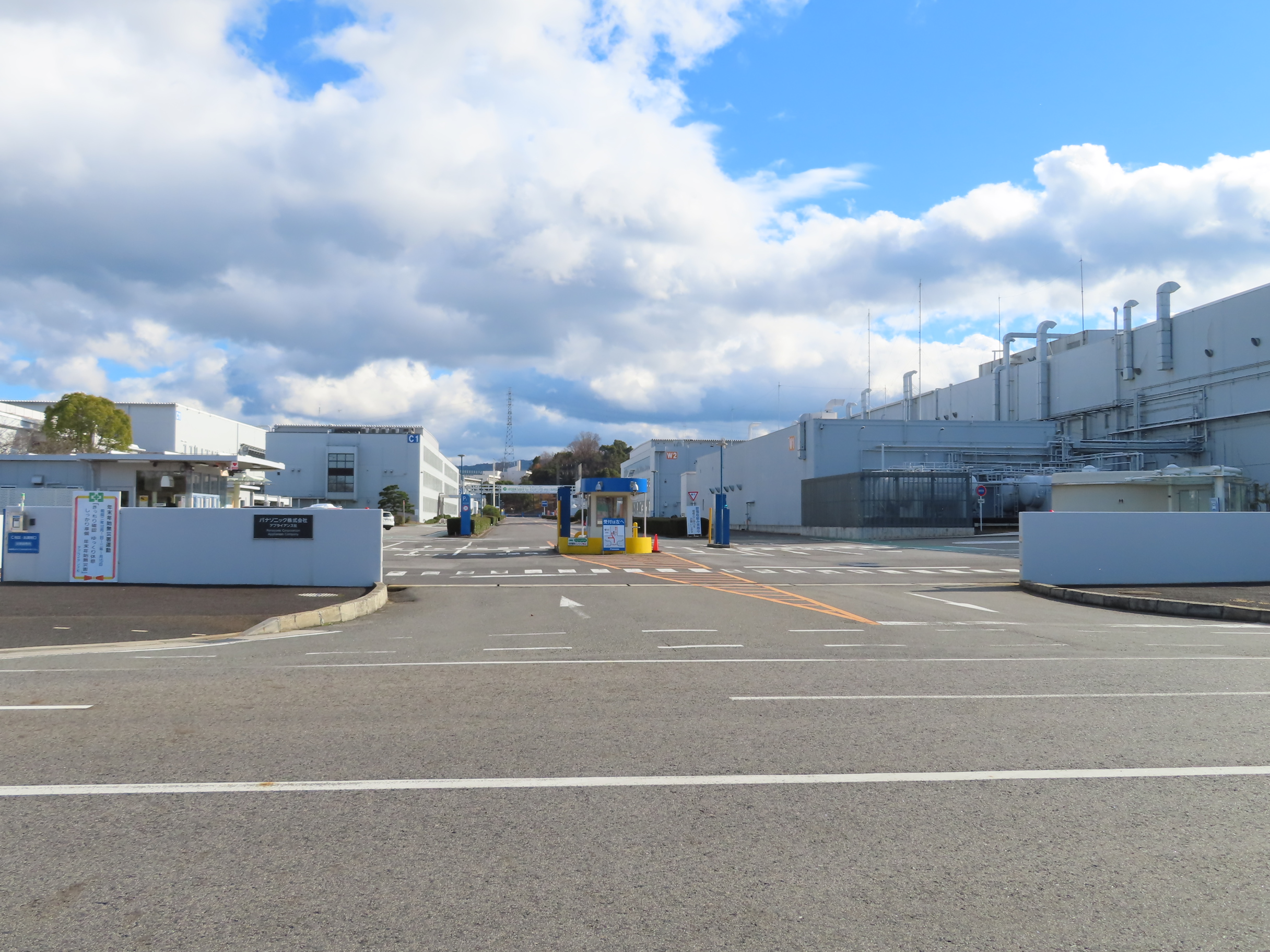
Panasonic factory in Kusatsu, Gunma Prefecture, Japan

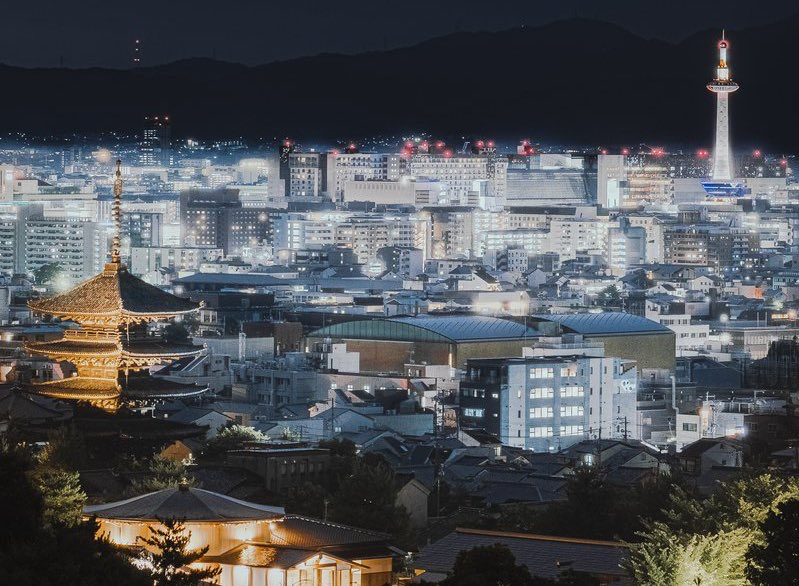
Kyoto is the center of Japan's technology industry.

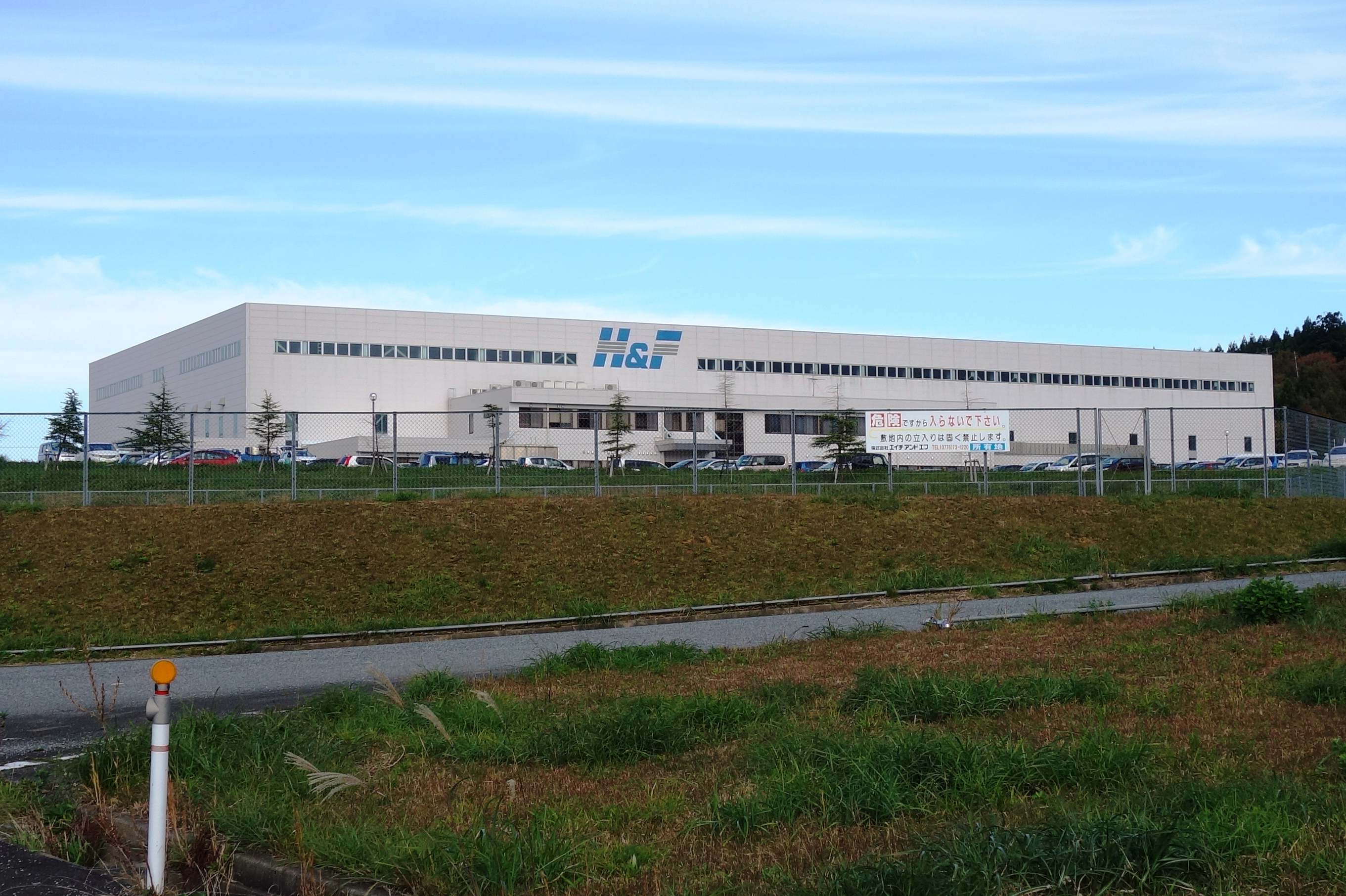
Hitachi Zosen Fukui Corporation plant at Kumasaka, Awara-shi, Fukui Prefecture, Japan

Japan has 7 of top 20 largest chip manufacturers as of 2005. Japanese electronics are known for their quality, durability, and technological sophistication. Some of these companies cross over to automobile and finance sectors as part of a keiretsu. Many internationally renowned electronics companies are based in Japan, including:

- Canon
- Casio
- Citizen
- Fujitsu
- Hitachi
- Mitsubishi Electric
- NEC
- Nikon
- Nintendo
- Panasonic
- Pioneer Corporation
- Roland Corporation
- SEGA
- Sharp
- Seiko
- Sony
- Toshiba
- Yamaha

Japan's computer industry developed with extraordinary speed and moved into international markets. Japanese computer technologies are some of the most advanced in the world. The leading computer main frame manufacturers in Japan at the end of the 1980s (in the domestic market) were Fujitsu, Hitachi, NEC, IBM Japan and Unisys. Leading personal computer manufacturers were NEC, Fujitsu, Seiko Epson, Toshiba and IBM Japan.

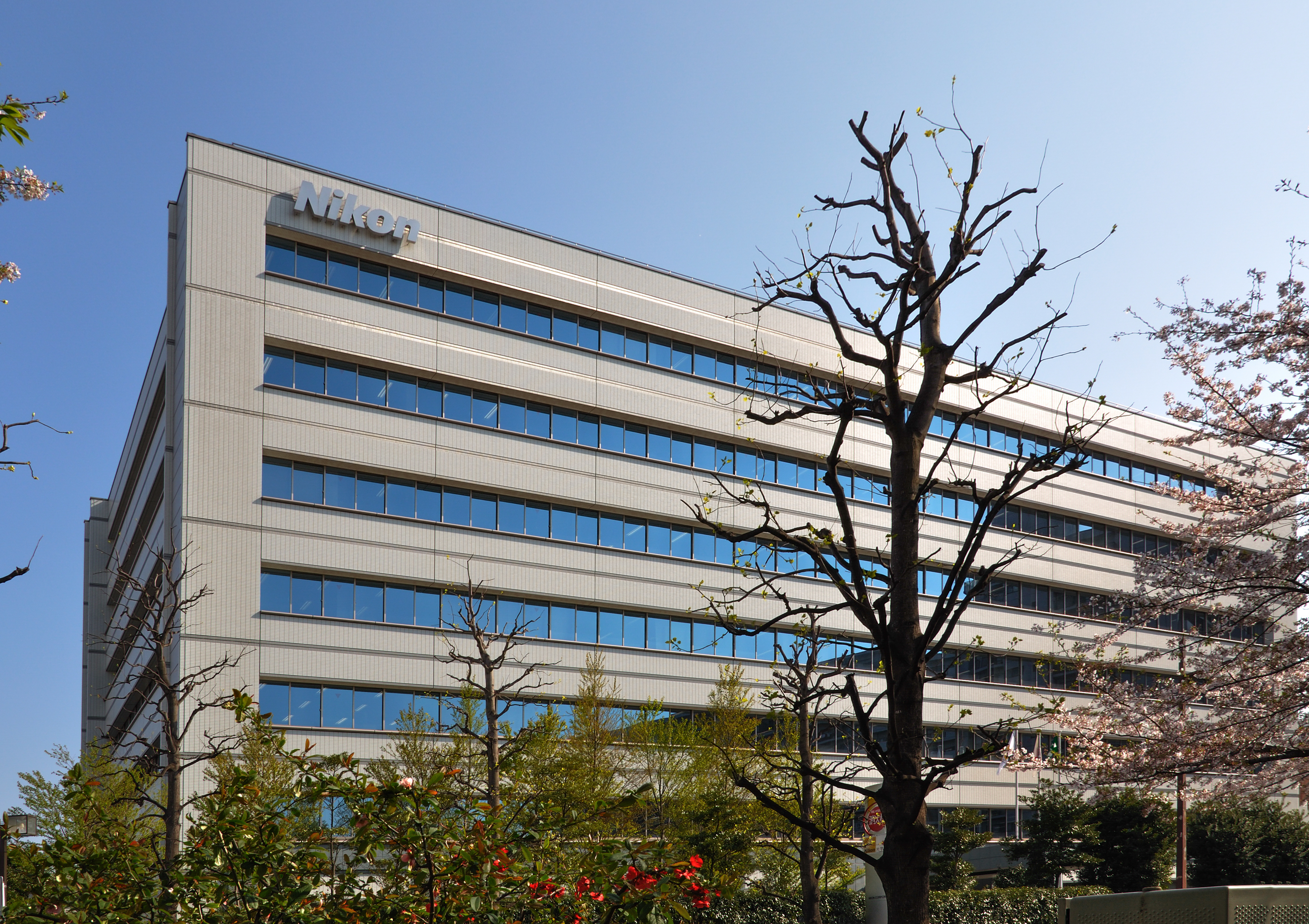
Nikon WestBuilding in Tokyo

In 1988, Japan exported US$1.5 billion of computer equipment, up more than twelvefold from the US$122 million in 1980. Japanese firms were not very successful in exporting mainframe computers, but they did very well in peripheral equipment, such as printers and tape drives. In the rapidly growing personal computer market, Japan achieved a major market share in the United States during the 1980s. Imports of computer equipment in 1988 came to US$3.2 billion (including parts).

Economic developments, namely outsourcing and globalization made these disputes obsolete by the 1990s. Japanese and U.S. influence in the computer market dwindled, with Taiwanese and mainland Chinese companies taking over component production and later research and development.

== See also ==
- Economy of Japan
- List of Japanese companies
