= List of exports of Japan =

Exports of Japan by product category (2019) Chemical products Transportation Machines Mineral products Plastics and rubbers Metals Foodstuffs Precious metals Textiles Instruments Animal products Vegetable products Paper goods Footwear and headwear Miscellaneous Stone and glass Wood products Animal and vegetable bi-products Animal hides Arts and antiques Weapons

The following is a list of the exports of Japan. Data is for 2016–2020, in millions of United States dollars, as reported by The Observatory of Economic Complexity. Currently the exports contributing at least 0.67% to total export in any year are listed.

Product	Value (2012)	Value (2020)
Metal	104,286	105,000
Vehicle Parts	42,212	37,600
Integrated circuits	19,192	33,000
Industrial printers	17,465	13,400
Machinery Having Individual Functions	13,577	12,900
Large Construction Vehicles	13,249	9,770
Trucks	12,243	11,100
Refined Petroleum	11,451	7,920
Video Recording Equipment	11,207	4,600
Low-voltage Protection Equipment	10,141	10,500
Hot-Rolled Iron	10,094	6,840
Engine Parts	9,293	6,970
Rubber tyres	8,828	5,650
LCDs	8,241	6,720
Semiconductor devices	8,146	12,400
Photo Lab Equipment	8,021	5,630
Raw Plastic Sheeting	7,608	5,480
Cyclic Hydrocarbons	7,320	3,930
Air pumps	6,602	5,860
Transmissions	6,540	6,870
Optical fibers	6,534	4,000
Computers	6,230	5,110
Broadcasting accessories	6,170	4,740
Gold	6,140	10,050
Medical instruments	5,980	7,040
Metalworking transfer machines	5,900	3,040
Spark-ignition engines	5,850	6,090
Ball bearings	5,810	4,550
Combustion engines	5,800	4,090
Electrical capacitors	5,610	6,630
Valves	5,520	5,160
Telephones	5,390	8,130
Thermostats	4,440	5,530
Chemical analysis instruments	4,390	6,430
Aircraft parts	4,290	5,400
Electric batteries	3,410	5,380
Passenger and cargo ships	949	13,300
not specified	0	37,200
