= Tokugawa coinage =

Monetary system in Japan

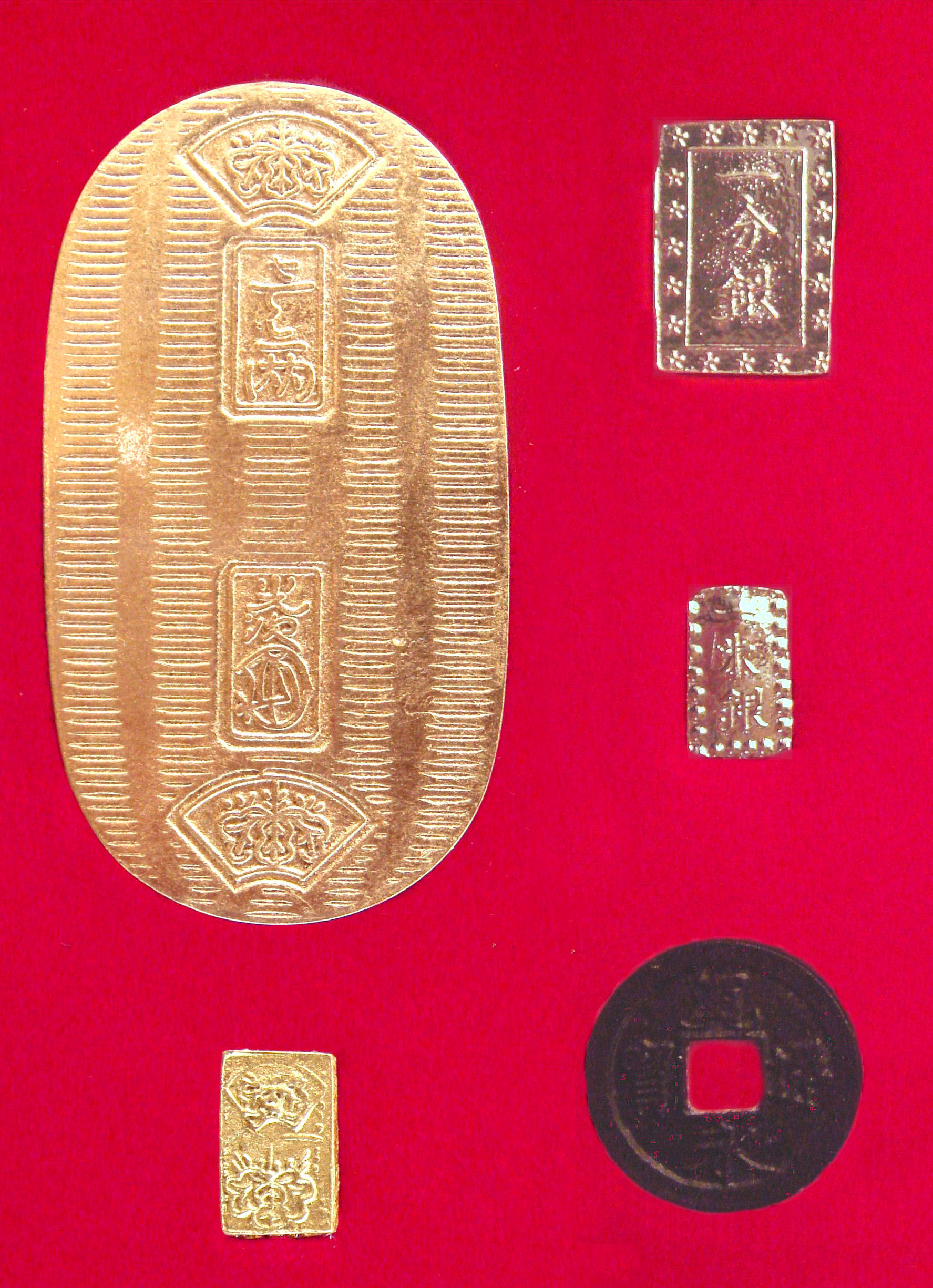
Main coins of Tokugawa coinage. A large ovoid gold Koban, under it a small gold Ichibuban, top right a silver Ichibuban, under it a silver Isshuban and a bronze round Mon.

Tokugawa coinage was a unitary and independent metallic monetary system established by shōgun Tokugawa Ieyasu in 1601 in Japan, and which lasted throughout the Edo period until its end in 1867.

== History ==
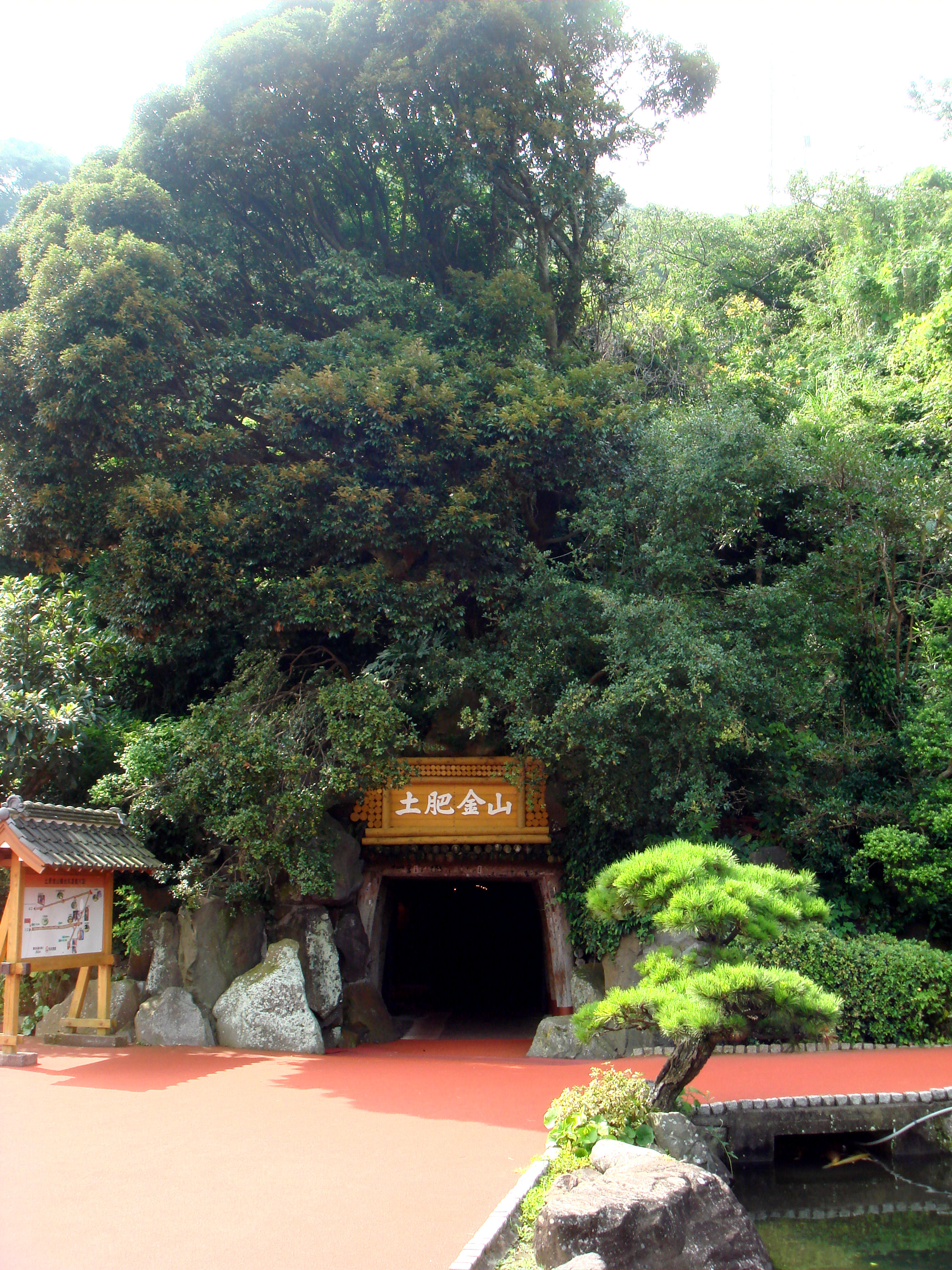
Gold mines across Japan, such as the Toi gold mine in present-day Izu, Shizuoka Prefecture, provided the material for the coinage.

The establishment of Tokugawa coinage followed a period in which Japan was dependent on Chinese bronze coins for its currency. Tokugawa coinage lasted for more than two centuries, and ended with the events of the Boshin war and the establishment of the Meiji restoration. However, there is an ongoing discussion of the entity of the precious metal coins. It was not a part of Tokugawa bakufu which issued gold and silver coins, but private organizations owned by merchants.

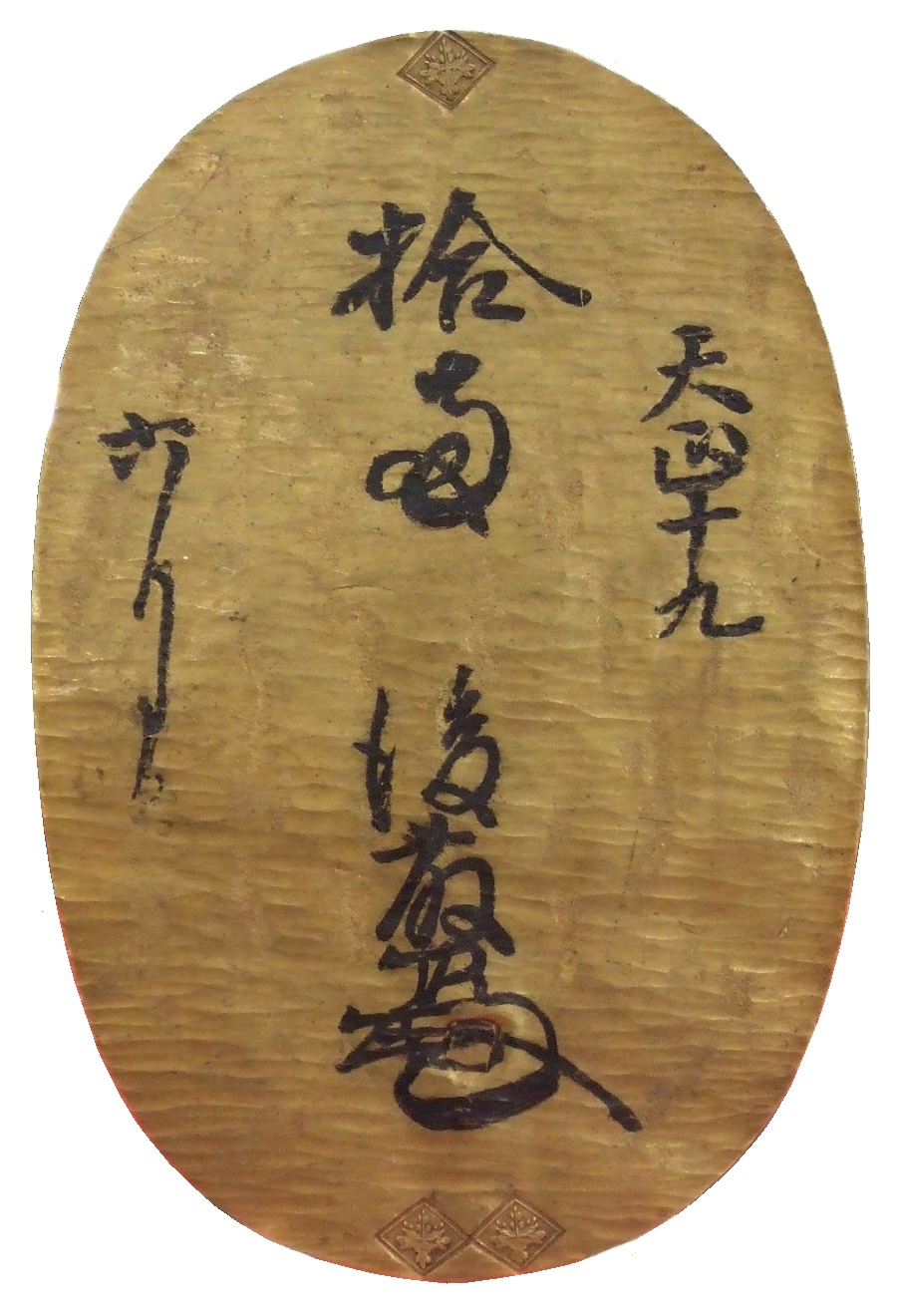
A Tenshō Ōban (天正大判), made in 1588 by Toyotomi Hideyoshi

The first attempt at a new currency was made by Toyotomi Hideyoshi, who developed the large Ōban plate, also called the Tensho Ōban (天正大判), in 1588.

From 1601, Tokugawa coinage was minted in gold, silver, and bronze denominations. The denominations were fixed, but the rates fluctuated on the exchange market.

The material for the coinage came from gold and silver mines across Japan. Gold mines were newly opened and exploited for the materials to produce coinage, such as the Sado gold mine or the Toi gold mine in Izu Peninsula.

=== Devaluations and re-evaluations ===
Initially, the coinage was used for export purposes in order to pay for imports of luxury goods from China, such as silk. Due to government deficit, and limited supply of gold and silver, the content of gold in coins was decreased on two occasions, in 1695 and 1706–11, in order to generate more revenue from seigneurage, but with the side effect of generating inflation.

At the beginning of the 18th century, Japan started to restrict the export of bullion currency, An export ban on physical currency was imposed by Arai Hakuseki in 1715. Trade substitution was encouraged, but remained limited due to the policy of closure, or Sakoku. Upon Arai Hakuseki's suggestion, the government increased the gold and silver content of coinage in 1714, which led to severe deflation. In 1736, Japan abandoned this policy and again increased the money supply, with a resulting price stability for the next 80 years.

In the early 19th century, budgetary problems resulting from natural disasters and large Tokugawa governmental expenditures led the government to increase the money supply, and the seigneurage associated with it. From 1818 to 1829, the money supply increased by 60%, and from 1832 to 1837 by 20%. Severe inflation again followed as prices nearly doubled.

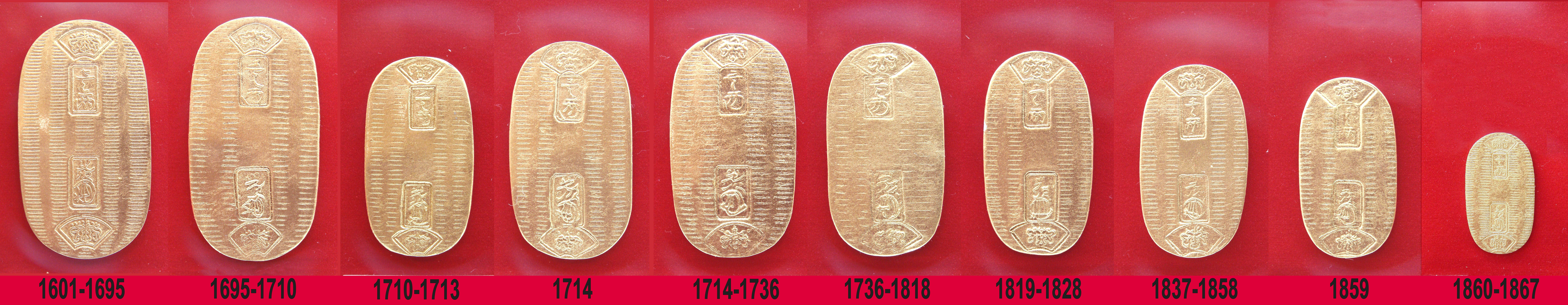
Size evolution of the Koban during the Tokugawa period. From left to right: Keichō koban (1601–95), Genroku koban (1695–1710), Hōei koban (1710–14), Shōtoku koban (1714), Kyōhō koban (1714–36), Genbun koban (1736–1818), Bunsei koban (1819–28), Tenpo koban (1837–58), Ansei koban (1859), Man'en koban (1860–67).

== Structure ==
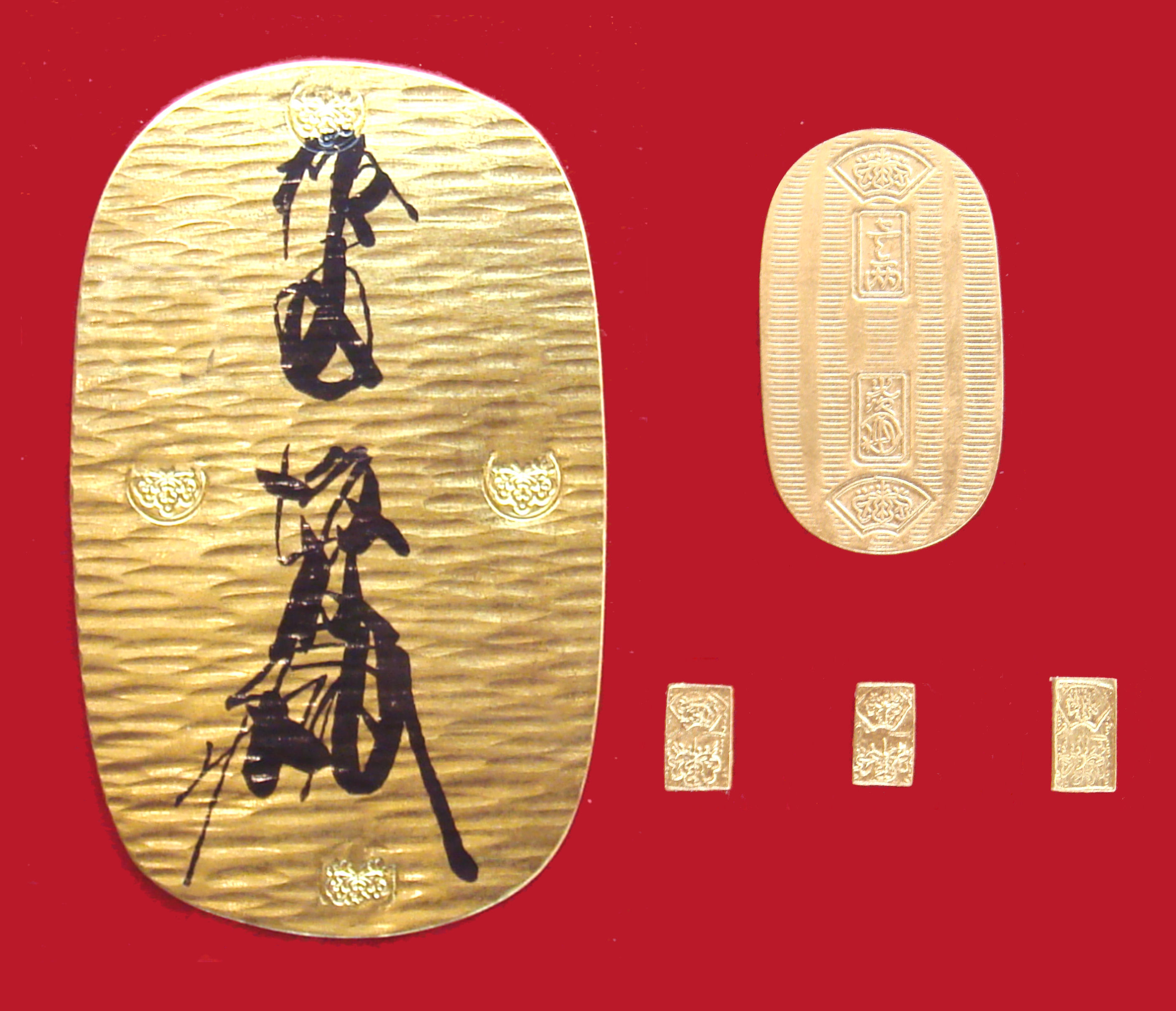
Keichō gold coinage: Ōban, Koban, Ichibuban, 1601–95.

Tokugawa coinage worked according to a triple monetary standard, using gold, silver and bronze coins, each with their own denominations. The systems worked by multiples of 4, and coins were valued according to the Ryō. One Ryō was worth 4 Bu, 16 Shu, or 4,000 Mon (a cheap copper coin).

=== Ōban ===
The Ōban (大判) was a very large gold coin plate, equivalent to ten Ryō, or ten Koban (小判) plates. It was used for ceremonies and as rewards.

=== Koban ===
The Koban (小判) was a regular ovoid gold coin, equivalent to one Ryō. The initial Keichō Koban (minted from 1601) had a weight of 18.20g. The 1714 Sado Koban (佐渡小判金, 4th year of Shōtoku) also had a weight of 18.20g and was made with an alloy of typically 85.69% of gold and 14.25% of silver.

=== Nibuban and Ichibuban ===
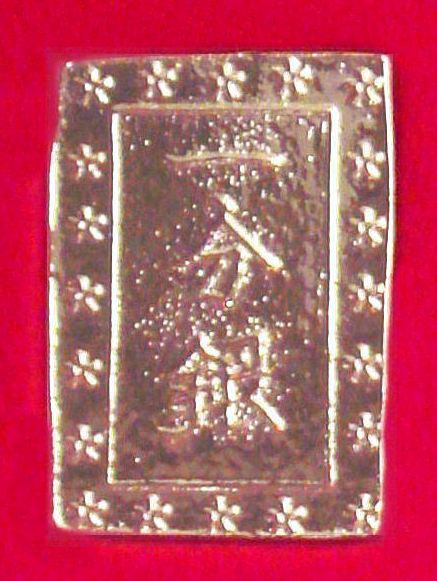
A Tenpō silver Ichibugin (1837–1854)

The Nibuban (二分判) was worth half a Koban and was rectangular gold coin.

The Ichibuban (一分判) could be either made of silver or gold, in which case it was a quarter of a Koban. The gold Ichibuban of 1714 (佐渡一分判金) had a weight of 4.5 g, with 85.6% of gold and 14.2% of silver. The silver Ichibuban from 1837 to 1854 (Tenpō Ichibugin, 天保一分銀, "Old Ichibuban") weighed 8.66 g, with an alloy of 0.21% gold and 98.86% silver.

=== Nishuban and Isshuban ===
There were then Nishuban (二朱判) and Isshuban (一朱判) small denominations of silver or gold, before getting to the Mon or Sen bronze coins.

From 1853 to 1865, the silver Isshuban (Kaei Isshugin, 嘉永一朱銀) weighed 1.88 g, with an alloy of 1.7% gold, 98.7% silver and 1.12% copper.

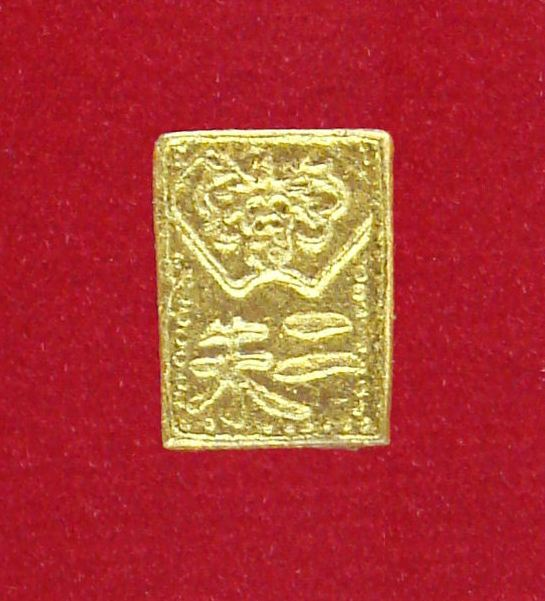
Genroku gold Nishuban (1695–1710)

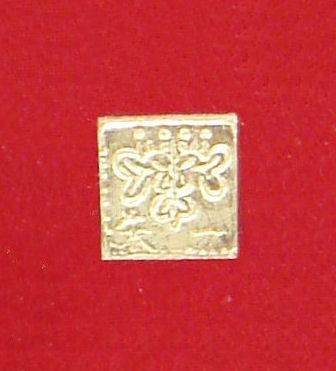
Bunsei gold Isshuban (1819–1828)

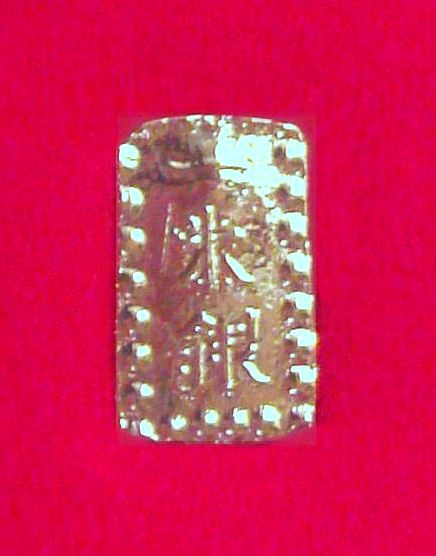
Kaei silver Isshuban (1853–1865)

=== Kan'ei Tsūhō ===
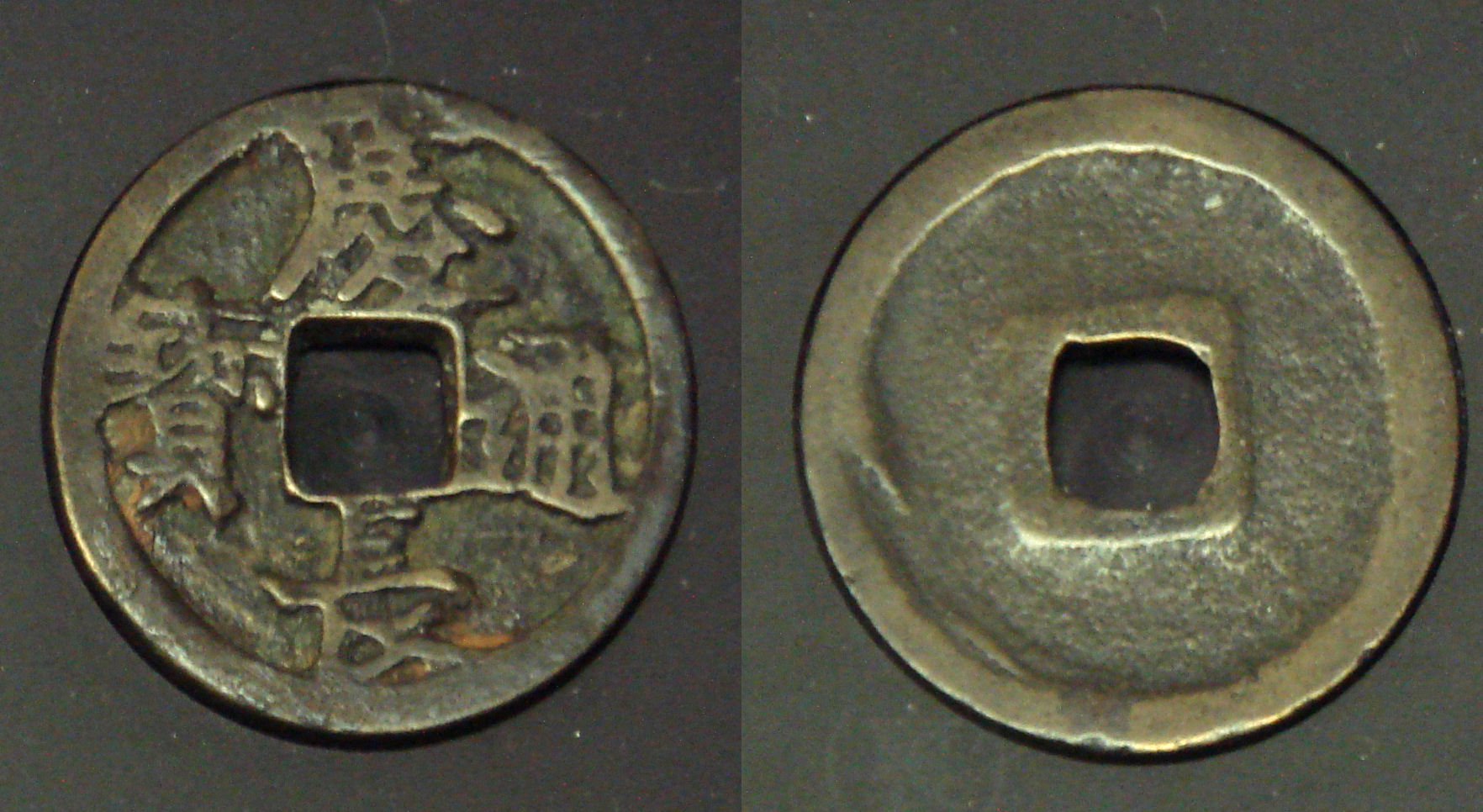
Keichō Tsūhō coin (慶長通宝), c. 1606

Regarding copper coins, the Kan'ei Tsūhō coin (Kyūjitai: 寛永通寶; Shinjitai: 寛永通宝) came to replace the Chinese coins that had been in circulation in Japan, as well as those that were minted privately, and became the legal tender. This put an end to more than four centuries during which Chinese copper coins, obtained through trade or Wakō piracy, had been the main currency of Japan.

=== Tenpō Tsūhō ===
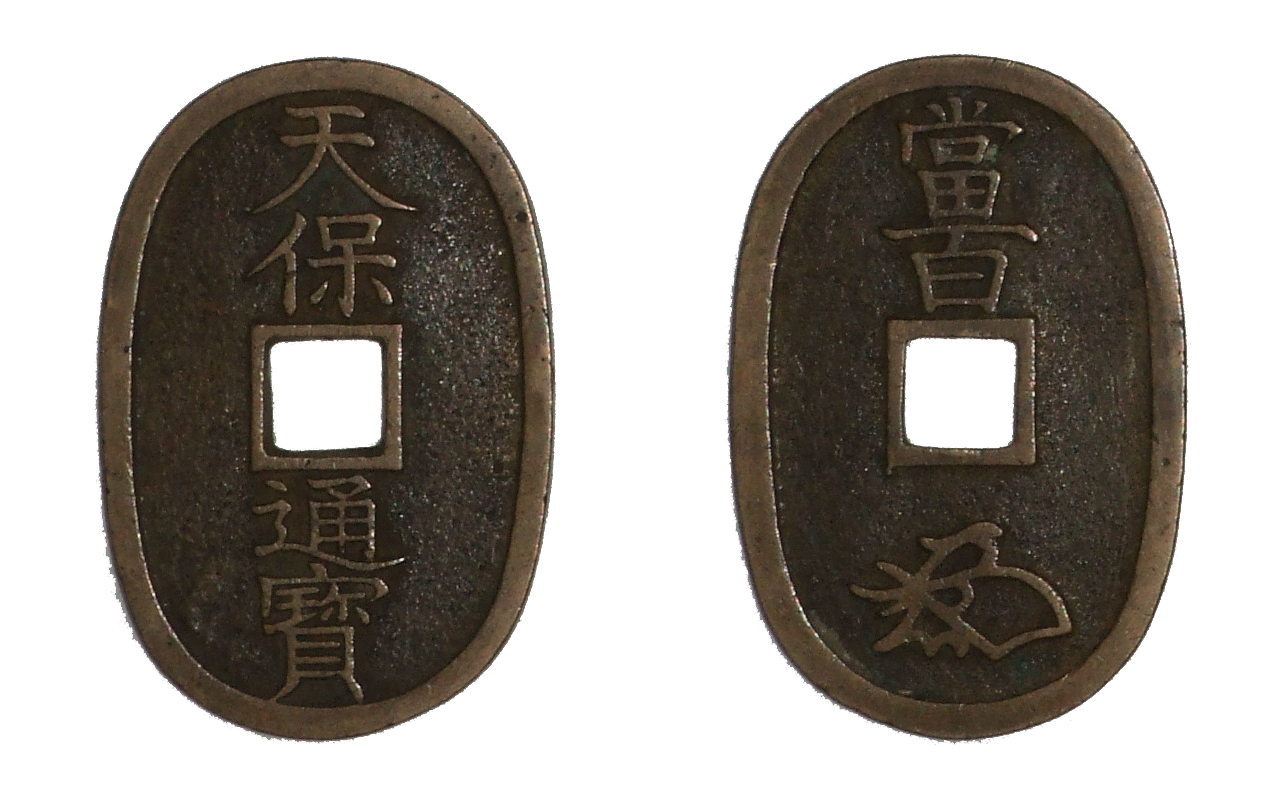
A Tenpō Tsūhō (天保通寶) ellipse-shaped copper coin

In 1835 the Tokugawa government started minting copper 100 mon named Tenpō Tsūhō (Kyūjitai: 天保通寶; Shinjitai: 天保通宝) as a way to solve its budgetary deficit, as the coin contained only 5½ as much copper as a 1 mon Kan'ei tsūhō this eventually led to inflation. This was later followed by the Satsuma Domain issuing a 100 mon coin of their own in 1862 to supposedly produce currency for the Ryukyu Kingdom, while in reality doing it to boost their own economy. These Ryūkyū Tsūhō (琉球通寳) coins eventually started circulating in other provinces as well.

== Demise ==
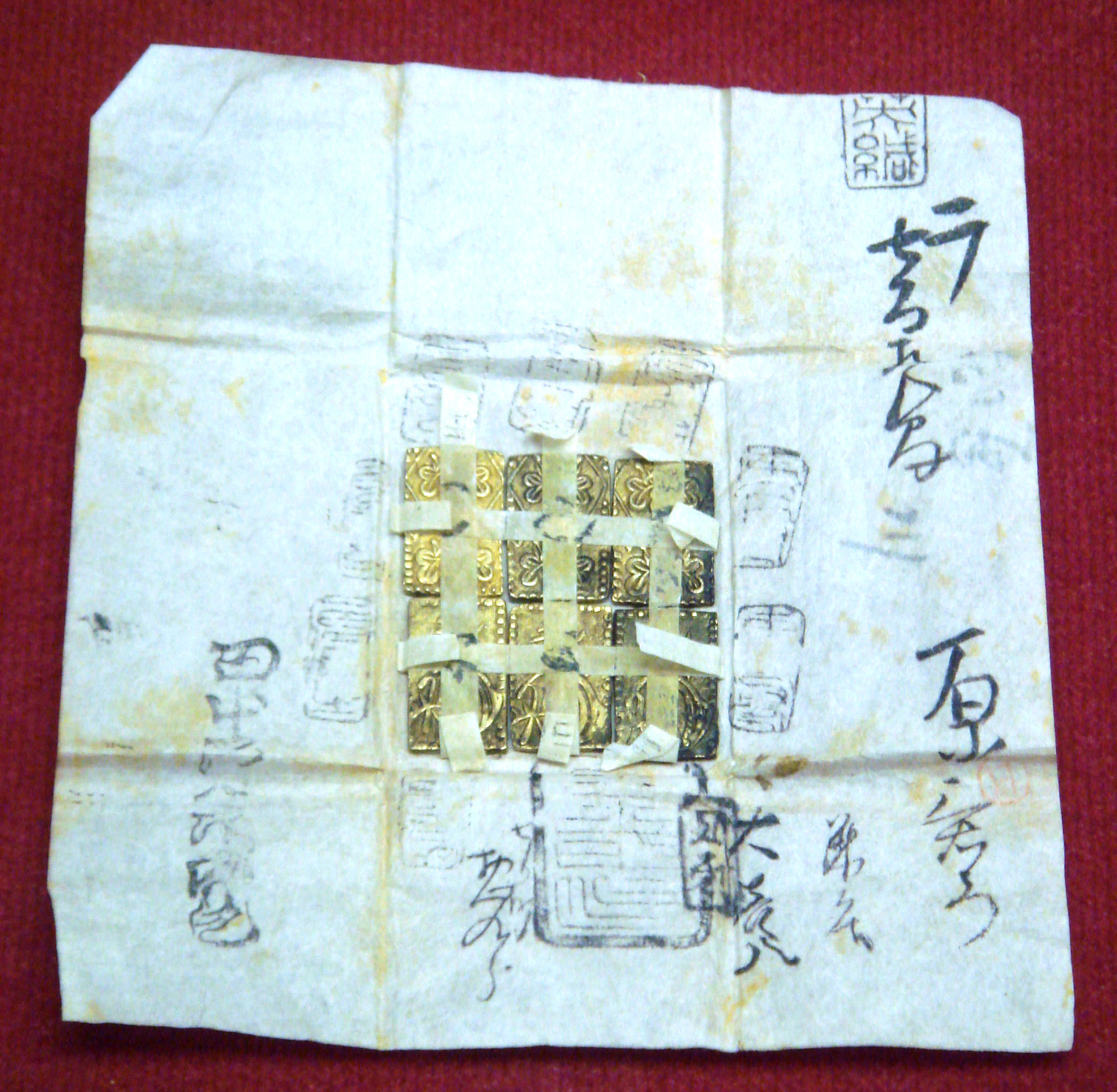
Nibunkin (二分金) coins, packaged and certified for easy handling and authentification

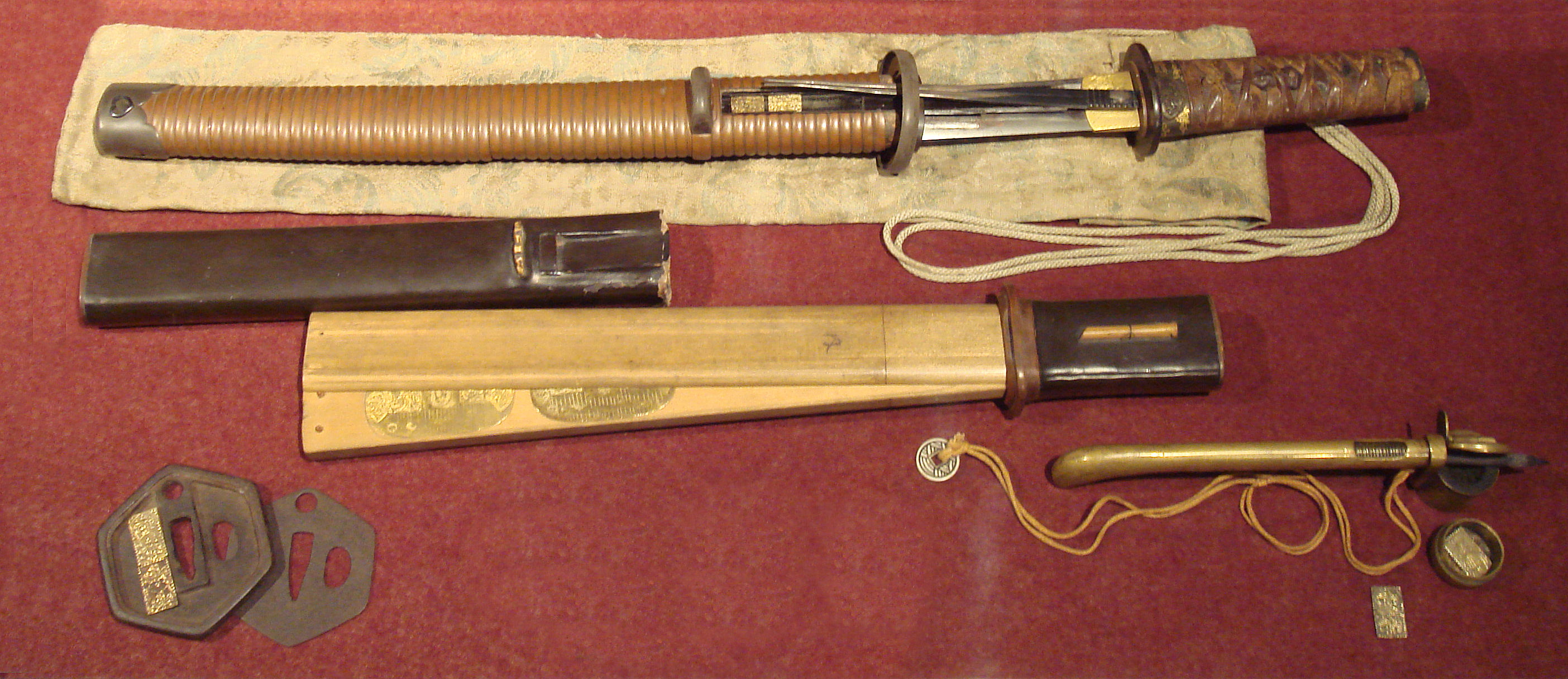
Hiding places for Tokugawa coinage

From 1772, the silver coins had a denomination in function of their value in gold, and had significantly less silver than their face value (rather than being just silver-by-weight) so as to cover coinage expenses, a practice known as token or fiduciary coinage, and a characteristic of modern coinage. This technique was introduced later in England, in 1816, with its adoption of the full gold standard. At the market rates of 1858, 10 silver units could be exchanged for 1 gold unit by weight, whereas the face value of silver units was only convertible at 5 to 1. This permitted an increase of monetary circulation without actual production of more bullion, and provided great profit (seigniorage) for the Bakufu.

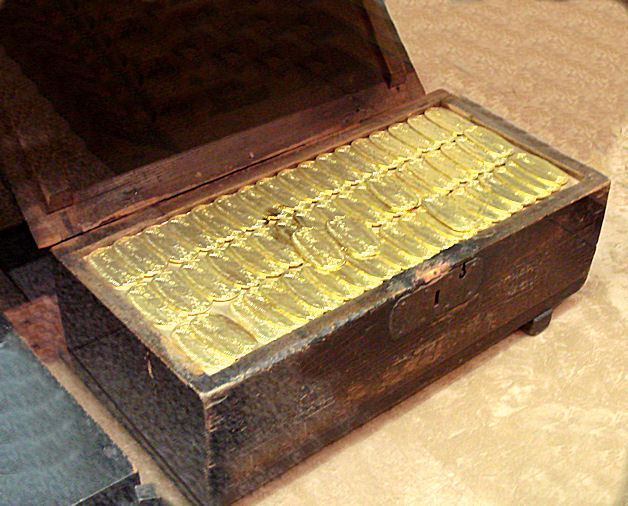
A Koban box (called Senryōbako, or "Box of 1,000 ryō"), used for transportation

World ratios for silver and gold were significantly different, gold being generally valued much higher than silver, at about 15 to 16 weights of silver for 1 weight of gold. This difference motivated foreigners to bring silver to Japan, to exchange it for gold at a very profitable rate.

In 1858, Western countries, especially the United States, France and Great Britain imposed through "unequal treaties" (Treaty of Amity and Commerce") free trade, free monetary flow, and very low tariffs, effectively taking away Japanese control of its foreign exchange: The 1715 export embargo on bullion was thus lifted:

"All foreign coin shall be current in Japan and pass for its corresponding weight of Japanese coin of the same description… Coins of all description (with the exception of Japanese copper coin) may be exported from Japan"

— Treaty of Amity and Commerce, 1858, extract

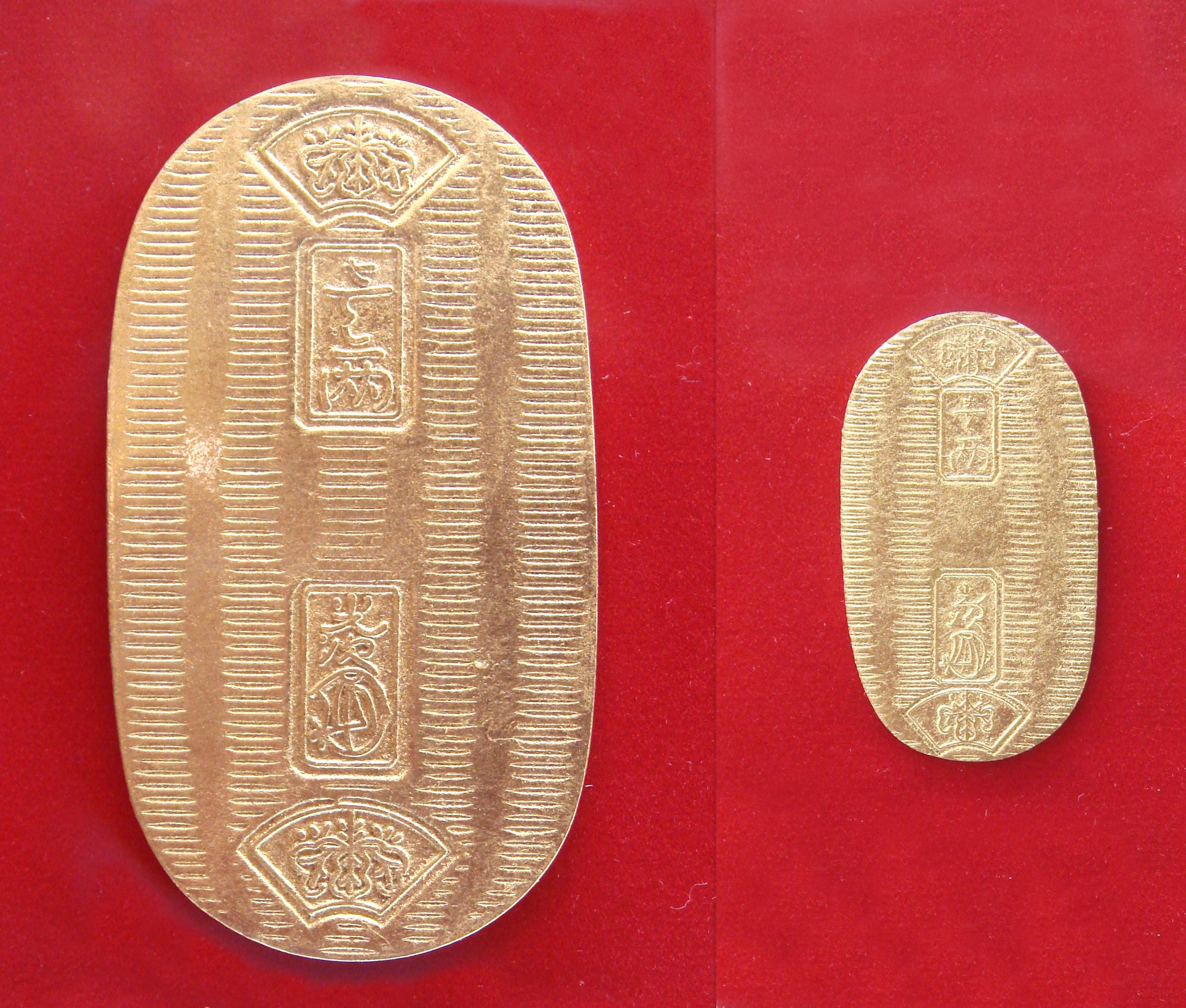
A Keichō koban (minted 1601–95), versus a Man'en koban (minted 1860–67), shows the drastic reduction in gold weight of the koban denomination.

This created a massive outflow of gold from Japan, as foreigners rushed to exchange their silver for "token" silver Japanese coinage and again exchange these against gold, giving a 200% profit to the transaction. In 1860, about 4 million ryōs thus left Japan, that is about 70 tons of gold. This effectively destroyed Japan's gold standard system, and forced it to return to weight-based system with international rates. The Bakufu instead responded to the crises by debasing the gold content of its coins by two thirds, so as to match foreign gold-silver exchange ratios.

As a consequence, the Bakufu lost the major profit source of recoinage (seigniorage), and was forced to issue unbacked paper money, leading to major inflation. This was one of the major causes of discontent during the Bakumatsu period, and one of the causes of the demise of the shogunate.

== Other coins ==
Despite Tokugawa Ieyasu's strong will to unify the currency, there were still some local exceptions, with locally made currency.

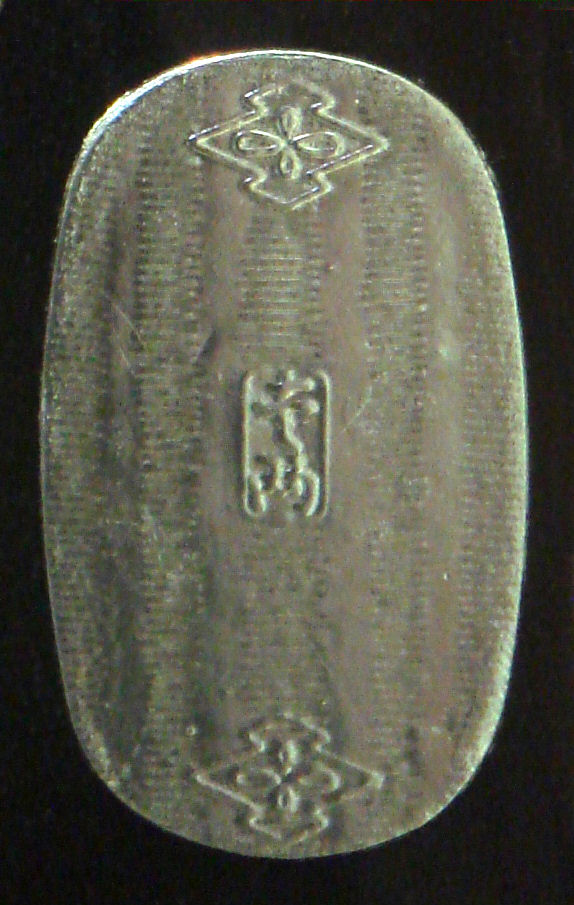
Silver koban of Sagami Province, called Odawara Hishi (小田原菱)

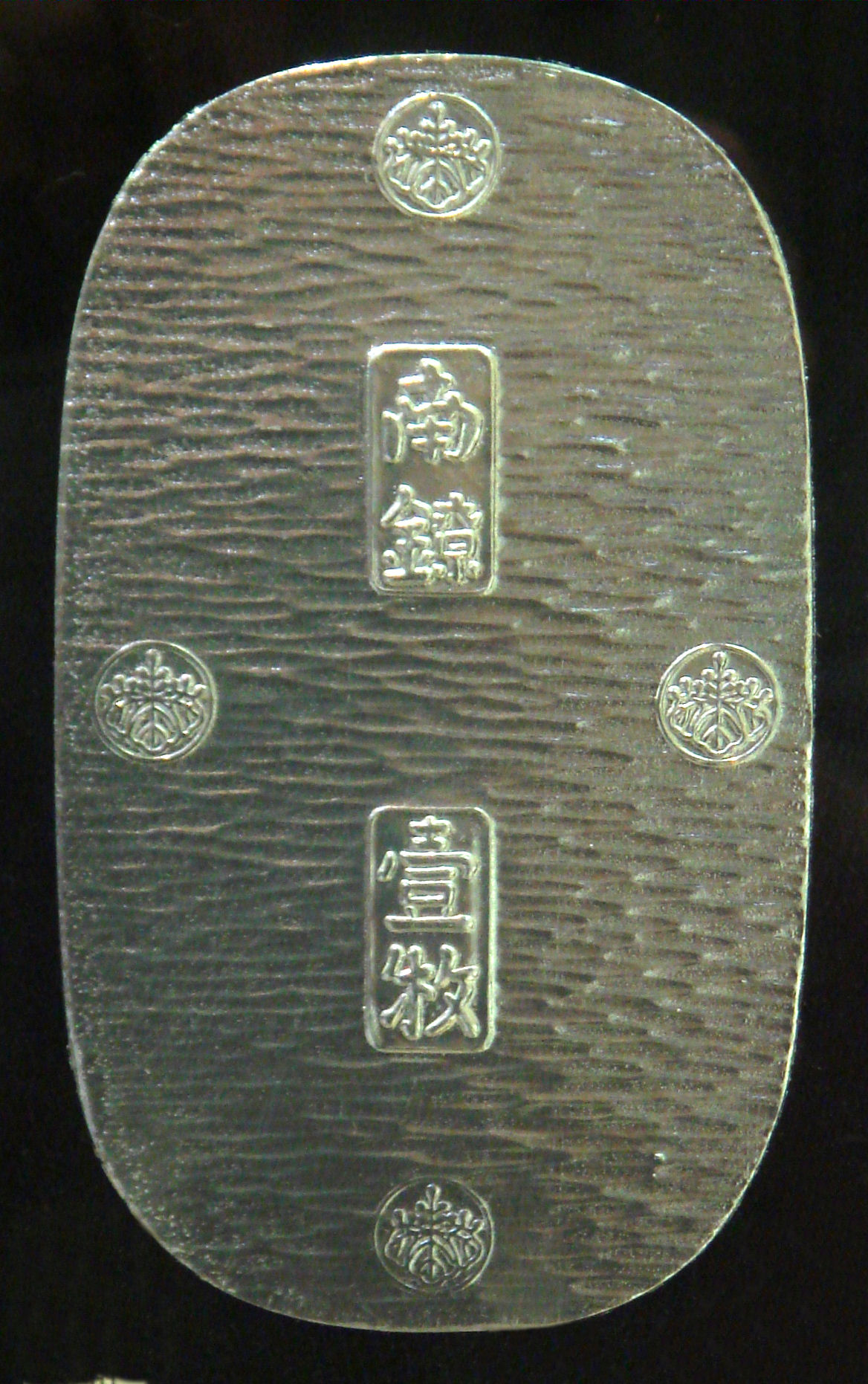
Silver Nanryō Ōban (南鐐大判)

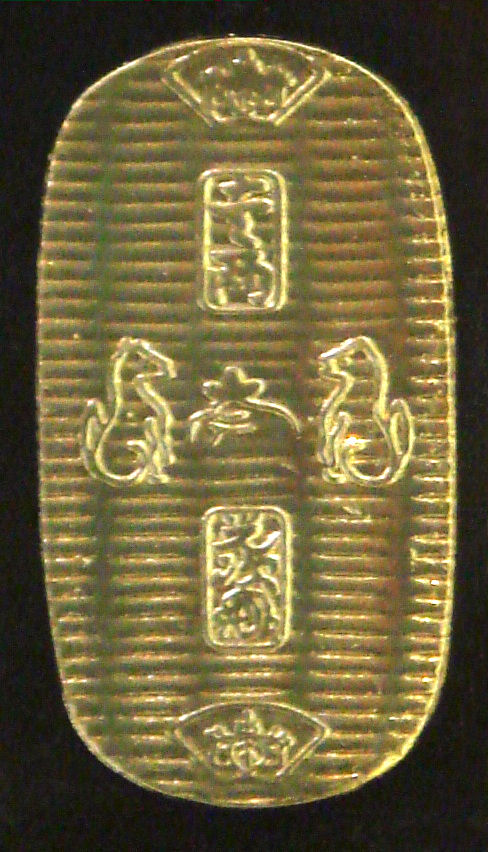
Gold Genbun Inari Koban (元文稲荷小判)

== Bibliography ==
- Metzler, Mark (2006). Lever of empire: the international gold standard and the crisis of liberalism in prewar Japan. Twentieth Century Japan: The Emergence of a World Power. Vol. 17. University of California Press. ISBN 0-520-24420-6.
