= Shu (silver coin) =

The Shu (朱) is a Japanese silver rectangular coin that circulated during the Edo period.

== Background ==
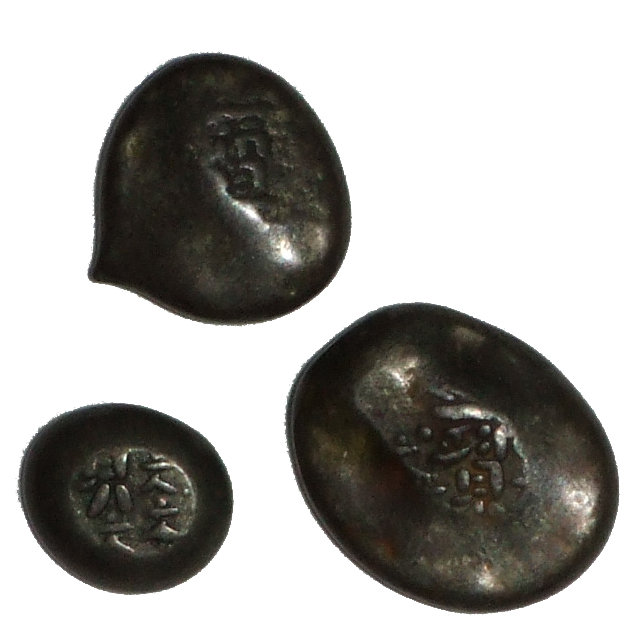
Ball-shaped nuggets used in Western Japan c.1736

Before the Meiwa period, Japan as a whole had previously been divided when it came to high-value transactions. While Koban and Ichibuban were commonly used in the East, in Western Japan coins were made up of ball and bar-shaped silver nuggets. The unstable and variable exchange rates between these two mediums caused the shogunate to unify the basis of currency into gold coins. Attempts to fix the exchange rate between gold and silver coins started with the issuance of Five Momme Gin (五匁銀) on September 4, 1765. In Western Japan during this time the official exchange rate was 60 momme for 1 ryō. The aim was to make a natural transition to something that could be exchanged for a single gold coin by having 12 countable units of Five Momme Gin. However, the prevailing rate at that time was around 63 momme (about 236.25 grams) of silver coins for 1 ryō which made exchanging the newly issued coins unrealistic. Another issue had to do with Money changers, who at the time avoided the fixed value of the Five Momme Gin. This was due to their income earnings from exchanging foreign gold and silver coins which included weighing fees for the latter.

All of these factors led to an inconvenient coin that did not largely circulate, which caused the Kanjō bugyō to issue orders to the accounting magistrate to redeem five monme silver for koban. An official price was set to collect the five monme silver and a collection by exchange began on July 23, 1768. The coins naturally disappeared over time from circulation without an edict to stop their use. Shogunate government officials next decided to issue silver coins equivalent to 2 shu, which was being used as a monetary unit of gold coins at the time. Their hope was to replace conventional silver coins with those fixed by a weight by carefully brainwashing the public into believing that gold coins were the basis of currency. This in turn would also hopefully eliminate their awareness of the concept of "small coins" (small balls and silver).

== Denominations ==
=== One Shu ===
One silver shu (朱銀) coins were minted during the Bunsei and Tenpō eras between 1829 and 1837, and referred to as Bunsei Ichishu Gin (文政南鐐一朱銀). These were created as a replacement for one shu gold coins which were not popular with the public at the time. Of particular issue was their low gold content which gave these coins a very bad reputation, so they were not often seen in circulation. The specifications for the Bunsei Ichishu Gin was a coin weighing 2.62 grams with an alloy of 98.95% silver, 0.14% gold, and 0.91% miscellaneous material. At the time of issuance the Bunsei shu was actually worth the same amount as 2 shu coins previously minted between 1772 and 1824. Bunsei one–shu silver coins were minted in large amounts and had an 8-year run which lasted until 1837 in the Tenpō era.

=== Two Shu ===
Two Shu silver (二朱銀) coins were first minted during the Meiwa to Bunsei eras between 1772 and 1824, and are referred to as Nanryō ni Shugin (南鐐二朱銀). While made of silver, the Tokugawa shogunate refused to use the word Gin (silver) and officially gave them the name Nanryō ni Shuban (南鐐二朱判). This title was given to express desire for the coins by giving them a name similar to the Ichibuban. In both cases the given denominations were intended to be used as subsidiary currency of the Koban. Nanryō ni Shugin were made of a high quality silver known as Nanton (南鐐) or Nanji (南挺) which was smelted by cupellation, and their purity of 98% silver was considered to be extremely high at that time. While the decision by government officials (Kanjō bugyō) to begin minting these coins in 1772 clearly had to do with profits through seigniorage, they might have also been motivated by aggressive economic measures undertaken during the time. While minting was temporally suspended during the Kansei Reforms, it was later resumed in 1800 with no changes made.

== Specifications ==
=== Two Shu ===
Image	Minted	Mass	Material
	1772 – 1788	2.7 Momme (10.19g)	97.81% silver, 2.06% miscellaneous, 0.13% gold
	1800 – 1824 (Note: While "2 Shu" coins were issued from 1772 to 1824, reforms issued during the Kansei era break them down into 2 varieties. Those that were issued during the Meiwa era, and those issued during the Kansei era are both combined in the mintage total for "2 Shu" coins made between 1772 and 1824.)	2.7 Momme (10.19g)	97.81% silver, 2.06% miscellaneous, 0.13% gold
	1824 – 1830	2 Momme (7.49g)	97.96% silver, 1.82% miscellaneous, 0.22% gold
	1859	3.6 Momme (13.5g)	84.76% silver, 15.20% miscellaneous, 0.04% gold

== Circulation figures ==
Denomination	Era Namesake (Note: Edo coinage is named after their era of origin regardless of how many eras their actual mintage spans.)	Japanese dates (Note: These years are for reference only as the given coins may not be dated)	Gregorian dates	Mintage
1 Shu	Bunsei	文政七二十 – 天保八	1829 – 1837	139,914,768
1 Shu	Kaei	嘉永六 –	1853 – 1865	159,244,800
1 Shu	Keiō (Note: Meiji era "1 Shu" coins are also known as "Kaheishi" 1 Shu.)	慶應四 – 明治元	1868 – 1869	18,742,000
2 Shu	Meiwa	明和九 – 天明八	1772 – 1788	47,464,336
2 Shu	Kansei	寛政二十 – 文政七	1800 – 1824	47,464,336
2 Shu	Bunsei	文政七 – 文政三十	1824 – 1830	60,624,280
2 Shu	Ansei	– 安政六	– 1859	706,400
