= Ichibugin =

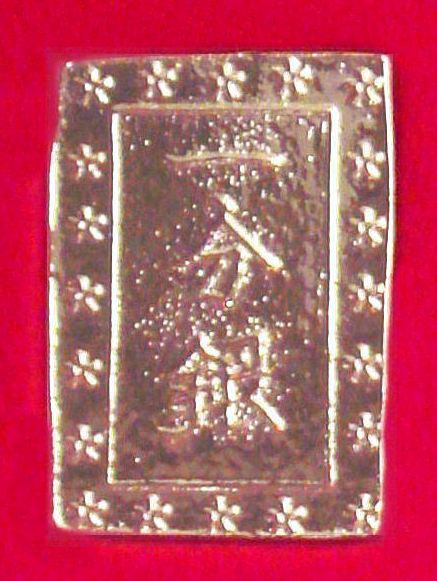
A silver Ichibugin.

The Ichibugin (一分銀) (aka: "bu" (分) for short) was a monetary unit of Japan towards the end of the Edo period. During their time in circulation each coin was worth 1/4 of a gold Ryō, and could also be exchanged four silver or gold shu coins. The medium of exchange was later expanded to allow 3 Ichibugin for a United States or Mexican Silver Dollar. While no coins worth "3 bu" were ever produced by the shogunate, the corresponding coins were countermarked as such.

== Specifications ==
| Image | Minted | Mass | Material |
|---|---|---|---|
| | 1837 – 1854 | 2.3 Momme (8.62g) | 98.86% silver, 0.93% miscellaneous, 0.21% gold |
| | 1859 – 1868 | 2.3 Momme (8.62g) | 89.36% silver, 10.57% miscellaneous, 0.07% gold |
| | 1868 – 1869 | 2.3 Momme (8.62g) | 80.66% silver, 19.25% miscellaneous, 0.09% gold |

== Circulation figures ==
| Denomination | Era Namesake (Note: Edo coinage is named after their era of origin regardless of how many eras their actual mintage spans.) | Japanese dates (Note: These years are for reference only as the given coins may not be dated) | Gregorian dates | Mintage |
|---|---|---|---|---|
| 1 Bu | Tenpō | 天保八 – 安政元 | 1837 – 1854 | 78,916,556 |
| 1 Bu | Ansei | 安政六 – 明治元 | 1859 – 1868 | 11,398,600 |
| 1 Bu | Man'en | 万延元 – 慶応二 | 1860 – 1867 | Unknown (Note: These are similar to gold coins made during the Kyōhō era (1716–1736). They all feature no dating mark and weigh over 4 grams.) |
| 1 Bu | Meiji | 明治元 – 明治二 | 1868 – 1869 | 4,267,332 |

== See also ==
- Tokugawa coinage
