= Dajōkansatsu =

Dajōkansatsu (太政官札) (aka: Daijōkwansatsu) refers to the first paper currency that was issued by the Imperial Japanese government (Daijō-kan) during the early Meiji era. These notes were issued from 1868 to 1869 as non-convertible fiat currency and circulated until they were gradually exchanged for Meiji Tsuho notes.

== History ==
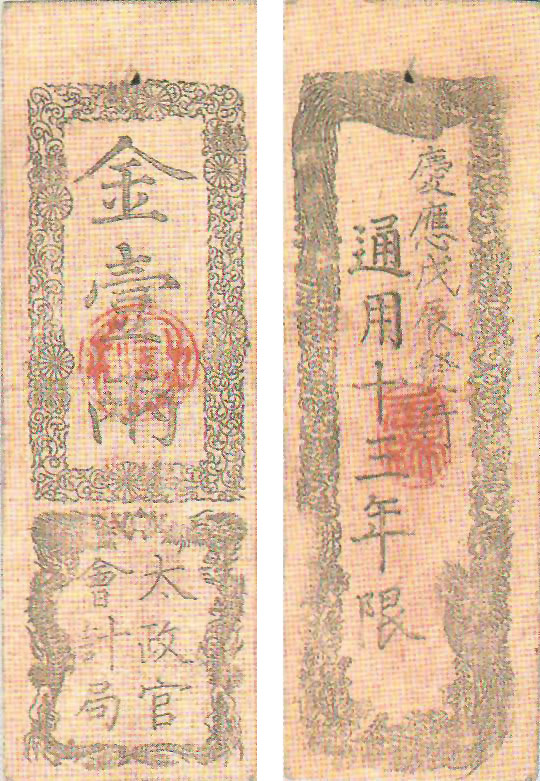
Dajōkansatsu 1 gold ryō note (1868).

During the Meiji Restoration the Japanese government entered the Boshin War without securing a financial foundation. As funding for the military was urgently needed a meeting was concurrently held in late January 1868 which included Yuri Kimimasa (Mitsuoka Hachirō), a participant and accounting secretary. Kimimasa proposed a measure that involved procuring 3 million gold ryō of accounting funds from wealthy individuals and print 30 million ryō banknotes. These Dajōkansatsu notes were actually issued as government bonds (Note: As opposed to banknotes, the Japanese banking system was not centralized until 1882 when the Bank of Japan was established.) as repayment was paid off in 13 years at a rate of 10% each year in Dajōkansatsu (principal repayment for 10 years, interest payment for the remaining 3 years). After the measure was approved, an issuance announcement was made to the public on April 19, 1868. Dajōkansatsu notes were made using copper plates which wore out when printed in large quantities. As there was no technology at the time to accurately reproduce these plates, they were hand-carved one by one. Dajōkansatsu notes were officially issued on May 25, 1868, after a delay due to torrential rain that hit the area.

Dajōkansatsu notes were not well accepted by the public upon their release, and it became "extremely difficult" to replace existing domain currencies. As a response, the Meiji government issued a decree on May 28, 1869 to limit the issuance of Dajōkansatsu to 32.5 million ryō. Their circulation was further shortened to a period to 5 years with a promise to pay 6% interest in one year if there is an outstanding replacement by the deadline. Although this "exigent fiscal measure" was highly controversial there was no plausible alternative. By June 1869 the Meiji government had issued 48 million ryō's worth of these nonconvertible paper notes denominated in gold to meet their military needs. During this same year, Ōkuma Shigenobu was appointed Vice-Minister of Finance and "made headway" towards standardizing the national currency. Shigenobu insisted on suspending the mintage of old shogunate coins in favor of a round shape based on a metric scale. When the han system was abolished in 1871 the yen replaced the ryō as a unit of currency.

When the new currency was introduced all of the notes previously issued by various clans were converted into new interest bearing notes denominated in units of yen. Previously issued Dajōkansatsu gold notes issued by the Daijō-kan were also withdrawn and exchanged for Meiji Tsuho in 1872.

== Circulation figures ==
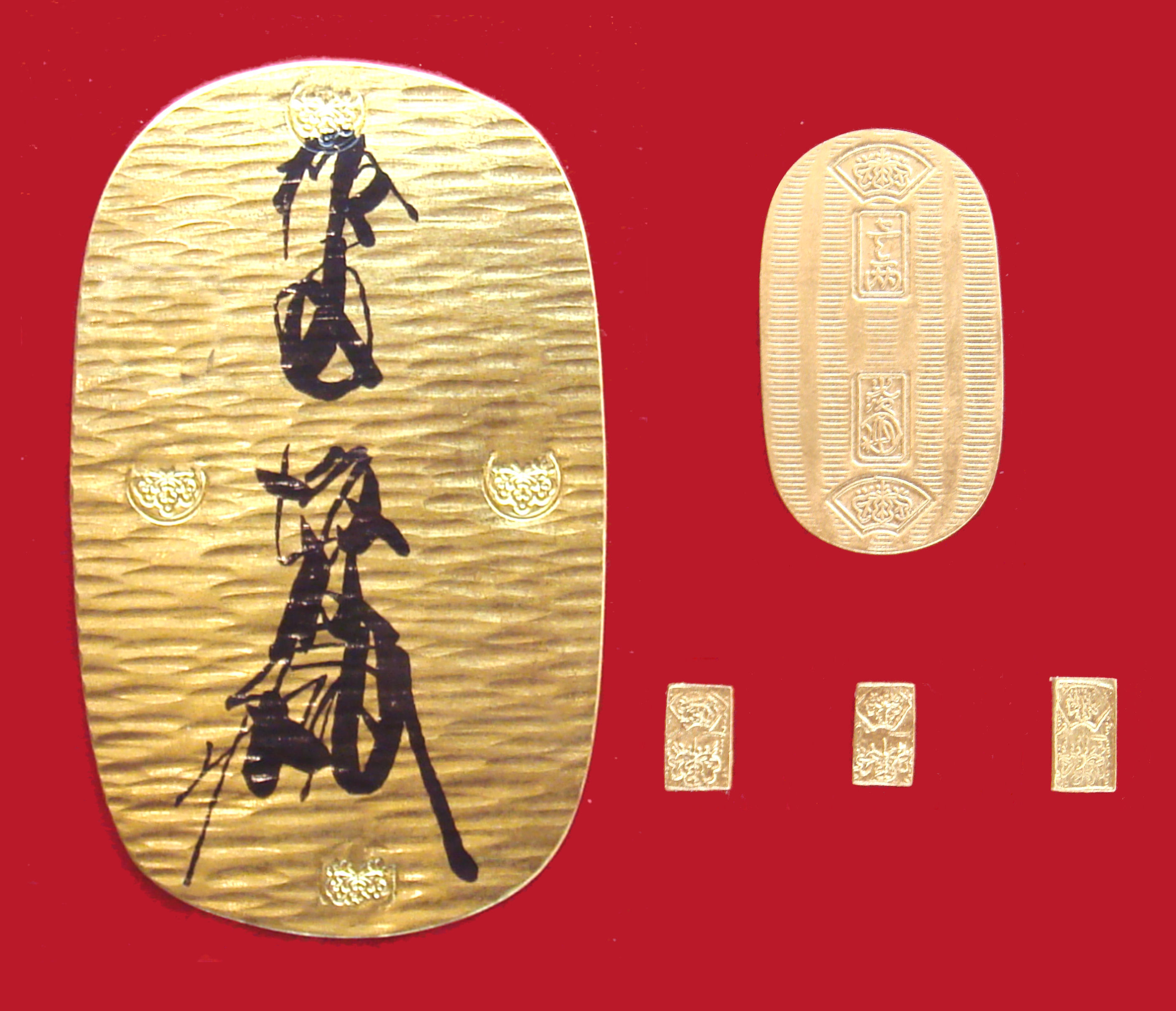
17th century Ōban (left), Ryō (top right), and Shu (bottom right) for comparison. These values were in name only as Dajōkansatsu notes were non-convertible.

Image		Denomination	Notes printed (face value)
Obverse	Reverse	Denomination	Notes printed (face value)
		1 Shu	1,050,000
		1 Bu (Note: One "Bu" was equal to 1/4 ryō or 4 gold shu coins.)	5,161,000
		1 ryō	15,485,000
		5 ryō	5,969,000
—N/a	—N/a	10 ryō	23,032,000

== See also ==
- Scrip of Edo period Japan
