= Shu (gold coin) =

Japanese Edo period gold coin

The Shu (朱) is a Japanese gold square coin that circulated during the Edo period.

== One Shu ==
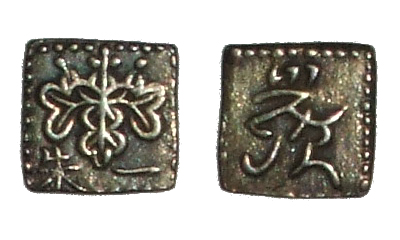
Gold Shu c.1824

Shu coins with a gold alloy first originated during the Bunsei era as they were first minted sometime in May 1824. These first square coins feature a Paulownia crest with 1 Shu (一朱) on the obverse and has Shozaburo Goto's signature engraved on the reverse. Initially, they were struck with an alloy of 12.3% gold, 87.4% silver, and 0.3% other miscellaneous material with weights of 1.40 grams. The gold content was intentionally kept low as the Shu was intended to be a subsidiary currency of the Ichibuban, and Koban.

When they were issued for circulation in July of the same year counterfeiters quickly took advantage of their quality. Of issue was the coin's low gold purity as its color was easy to replicate. Although efforts were made to dissolve any silver content on the coin's surface, the gold coloring wore off through circulation which gave way to a mixed and eventually silver coloring. These coins also proved to be unpopular with the public as they were small, unwieldy, and easy to lose. Replacements for the gold Shu in the form of silver coinage began on July 10, 1829, and gold Shu coinage ended in the 3rd year of Tenpō (1832). Legally, the series was discontinued at the end of the 11th year of Tenpō (1840).

== Two Shu ==
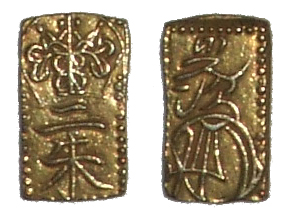
Tenpō Ni Shuban

The Two Shu (二朱金) coin was also struck in a gold square shape and circulated during the Edo period. While technically the first "2 Shu" coins date to the 10th year of Genroku (1697), these had the same grade as Ōban and are included with that type of coinage. Those issued at a later period include 2 different varieties which have their name tied to the era of their first mintage. The Tenpō Ni Shuban (天保二朱判) began to be minted on September 3, 1832, and entered into circulation on October 24 of the same year. Like the previously issued "1 Shu" coins, these were subsidiary currency of the Ichibuban. Differences include a weight increase of 1.64 grams each, and a higher gold content with an alloy of 29.9% gold, 69.7% silver, and 0.4% other miscellaneous material. Two Shu coins circulated for more than 30 years before they were suspended at the end of May 1866.

In the later years of Tenpō Ni Shuban coins, a new variety called Man'en Ni Shuban (万延二朱判) began to be issued on April 10, 1860. These were the thinnest gold coins of the Edo period weighing just 0.75 grams each with an alloy of: 22.9% gold, 76.7% silver, and 0.3% other miscellaneous material. Man'en Ni Shuban coins circulated until the end of September 1874 when they were replaced by the newly adopted yen.

== Circulation figures ==
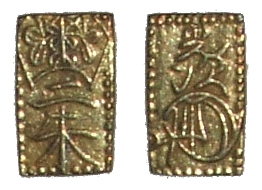
Man'en Ni Shuban c.1865

Denomination	Era Namesake (Note: Edo coinage is named after their era of origin regardless of how many eras their actual mintage spans.)	Japanese dates (Note: These years are for reference only as the given coins may not be dated)	Gregorian dates	Mintage
1 Shu	Bunsei	文政七 – 天保三	1824 – 1832	46,723,072
2 Shu	Tenpō	天保三 – 安政五	1832 – 1858	103,069,600
2 Shu	Man'en	万延元 – 明治元	1860 – 1869	25,120,000
