= Koban =

Koban may refer to:

- Kōban (交番), Japanese neighborhood police substation, sometimes called a "police box"
- Koban (coin) (小判, Koban), a former Japanese coin
- Koban culture, a Central North Caucasian culture circa 1100 to 400 BC
