= Fujin Tomari-kyaku no Zu =

Color triptych print by Kitagawa Utamaro

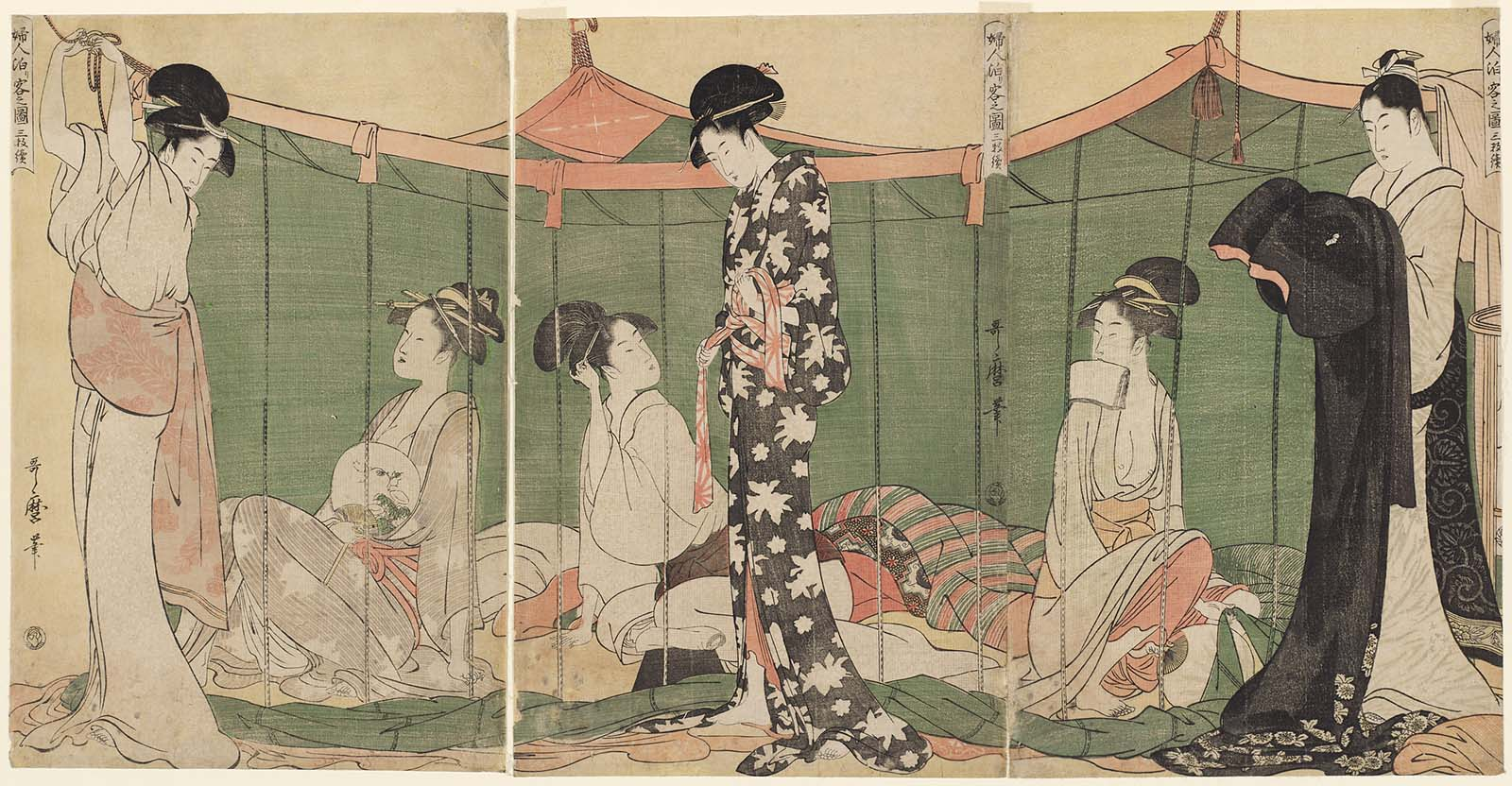
Fujin Tomari-kyaku no Zu (c. 1794–1795)

Fujin Tomari-kyaku no Zu Sanmai-tsuzuki (婦人泊り客之図三枚続, "Triptych Picture of Women Overnight Guests", c. 1794–1795) is a triptych print by the Japanese ukiyo-e artist Kitagawa Utamaro (c. 1753–1806). It depicts a group of women within a mosquito net preparing for an overnight visit.

== Background ==
Ukiyo-e art flourished in Japan during the Edo period from the 17th to 19th centuries, and took as its primary subjects courtesans, kabuki actors, and others associated with the "floating world" lifestyle of the pleasure districts. Alongside paintings, mass-produced woodblock prints were a major form of the genre. In the mid-18th century full-colour nishiki-e prints became common, printed using a large number of woodblocks, one for each colour. A prominent genre was bijin-ga ("pictures of beauties"), which depicted most often courtesans and geisha at leisure, and promoted the entertainments of the pleasure districts.

Kitagawa Utamaro (c. 1753–1806) made his name in the 1790s with his bijin ōkubi-e ("large-headed pictures of beautiful women") portraits, focusing on the head and upper torso, a style others had previously employed in portraits of kabuki actors. Utamaro experimented with line, colour, and printing techniques to bring out subtle differences in the features, expressions, and backdrops of subjects from a wide variety of class and background. Utamaro's individuated beauties were in sharp contrast to the stereotyped, idealized images that had been the norm.

== Publication ==
The multicolour nishiki-e prints in the horizontal triptych are each ōban-sized, measuring about 37 by 25 centimetres (15 in × 10 in). (Note: Precise sizes vary, and paper was often trimmed after printing.) They were published by Tsuruya Kiemon in c. 1794–95. On each print appears the title in a corner and the signature Utamaro hitsu (歌麿筆, "brush of Utamaro").

== Description and analysis ==
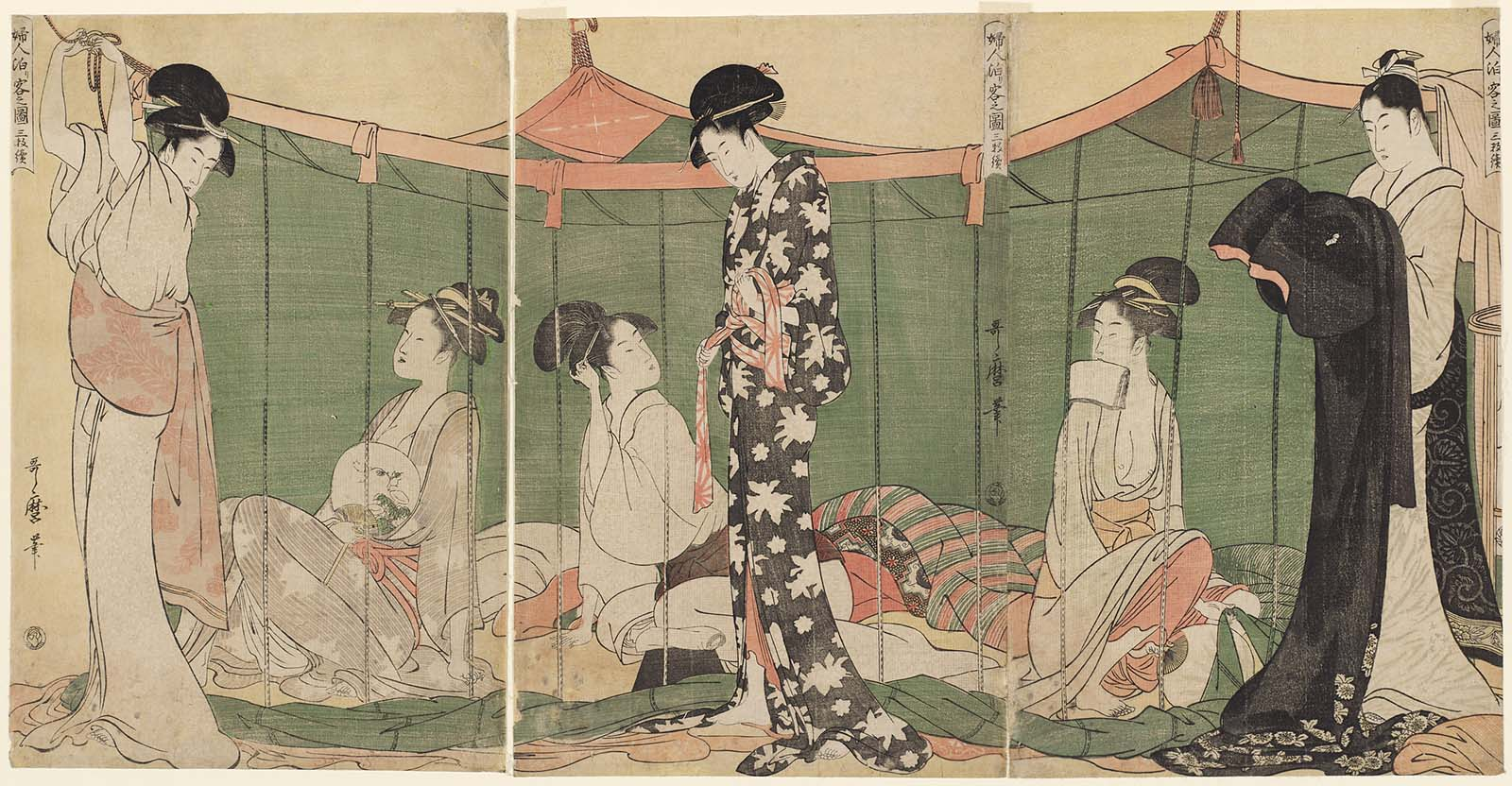

The scene depicts women in and outside a mosquito net. Outside in the centre stands a woman changing into nightclothes, and behind her to the right an servant folds a tomesode, a ceremonial black kimono worn by married women. The kimono bears a mon crest.

From inside, a woman to the right holding an uchiwa hand fan in her hands and folded sheets of kaishi paper in her mouth lifts the net as if to get out. In the middle, another woman removes a kanzashi as she prepares to go to sleep. To the left sits a woman of apparent middle age; her eyebrows are shaved off, indicating she is married. She looks outside to the left at a woman hanging the net up, and appears to be chatting with her.
