= Koban (coin) =

Coin from the Edo period of Japan

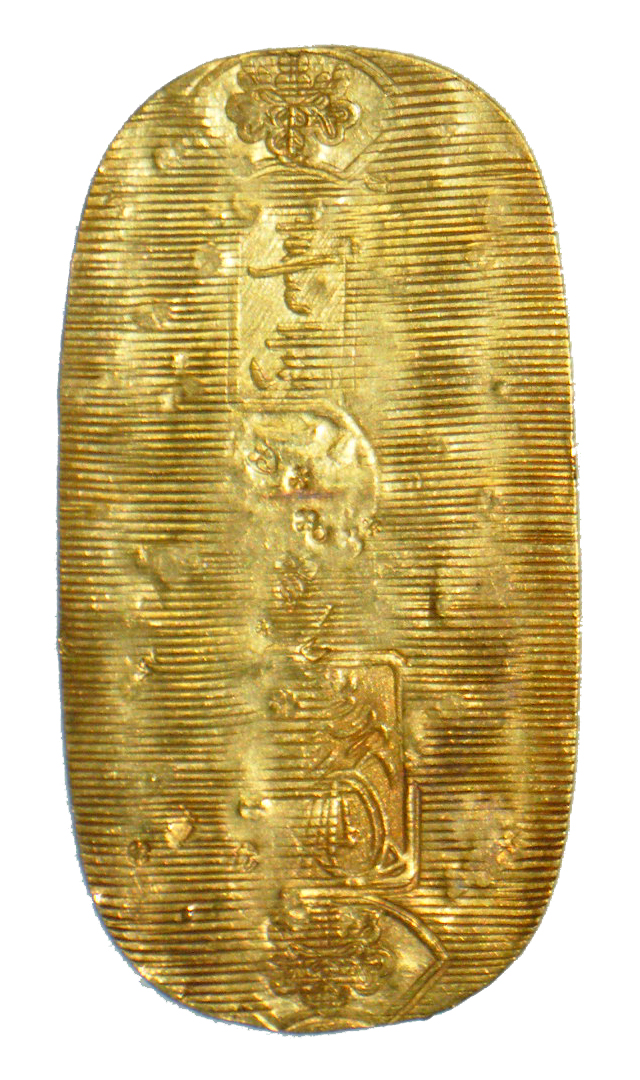
Koban

The koban (小判) was a Japanese oval gold coin, cast on the order of Tokugawa Ieyasu in Edo period (Keichō era) feudal Japan and a part of Tokugawa coinage.

== History ==
Minting of koban, Ōban and other coins began in year 1601 (year 5 of the Keichō era), signifying the beginning of the Tokugawa coinage. The Keichō era koban was issued with a face value of one ryō. Despite the existence of other gold and silver coins at the time, through a series of reforms the Bakufu managed to stabilize the koban to ryō 1:1 valuation by the end of the seventeenth century.

Nowadays, gold-foil cardboard versions of koban are sold as Engimono (縁起物, talisman/lucky charm) at Shinto shrines.

== Foreign trade ==
The Japanese economy before the mid-19th century was based largely on rice. The standard unit of measure was the koku, the amount of rice needed to feed one person for one year. Farmers made their tax payments of rice which eventually made its way into the coffers of the central government; and similarly, vassals were annually paid a specified koku of rice. The Portuguese who came to Japan in the 1550s, however, preferred gold to rice; and the koban, which was equal to three koku of rice, became the coin of choice in foreign trade.

Some feudal lords began minting their own koban, but the value was debased with alloys of varying gold content. Edo authorities issued one currency reform after another and just about all of them debased the koban further. Additionally, counterfeit koban circulated after each reform, their value slightly less than that of the then current koban. By the time of Commodore Matthew C. Perry's visit in 1853, counterfeit koban from previous eras were preferred by merchants to the newer variants. The fraudulent older pieces were more valuable than newly minted koban.

With the Meiji Restoration in 1868 a new series of coins was ordered based on European currency systems and the koban was discontinued.

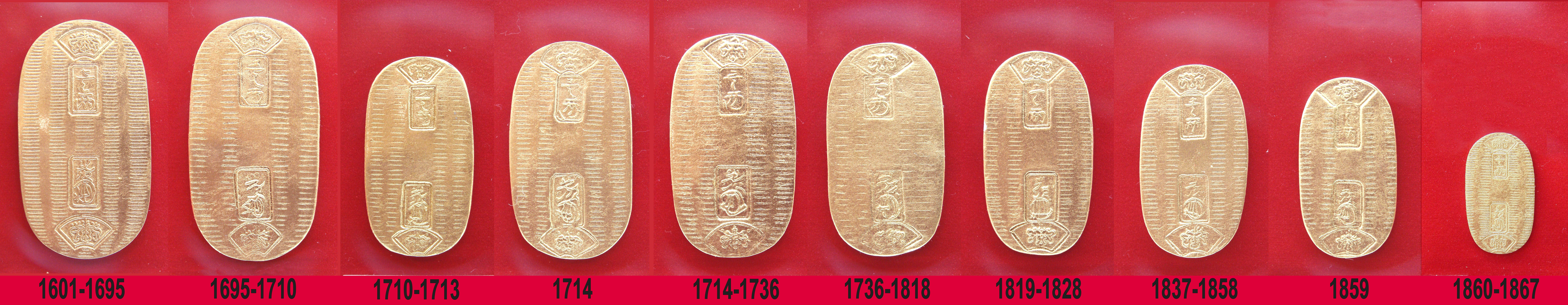
Size evolution of the Koban during the Tokugawa period. From left to right: Keichō koban (1601-1695), Genroku koban (1695-1710), Hōei koban (1710-1714), Shōtoku koban (1714), Kyōhō koban (1714-1736), Genbun koban (1736-1818), Bunsei koban (1819-1828), Tenpō koban (1837-1858), Ansei koban (1859), Man'en koban (1860-1867).

== Cultural references ==
Koban are commonly seen on maneki-neko figurines. Meowth, a maneki-neko-inspired creature in the Pokémon series, has a koban on its forehead.

== See also ==
- Ōban
- Ryō
- Omamori
- Ofuda
  - Fulu
- Spirit tablet
- Thai Buddha amulet
