= Ichibuban =

The Ichibuban (一分判) (lit: "one gold bu") was a monetary unit of Japan. The Ichibuban was a gold coin that was worth a quarter of a Koban.

The gold Ichibuban of 1714 (佐渡一分判金) had a weight of 4.5 g, with 85.6% of gold and 14.2% of silver. The silver Ichibuban from 1837 to 1854 (Tenpō Ichibugin, 天保一分銀, "Old Ichibuban") weighed 8.66 g, with an alloy of 0.21% gold and 98.86% silver.

The Nibuban (二分判) was worth double the Ichibuban, and half a Koban and was also a rectangular coin.

== Gold Ichibuban (一分判金) ==
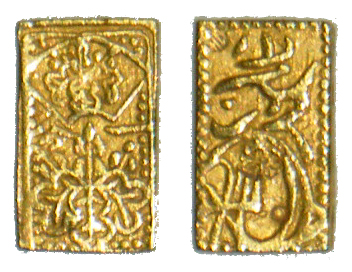
Keichō Ichibuban

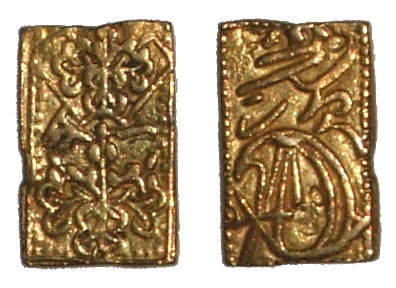
Kyōhō Ichibuban

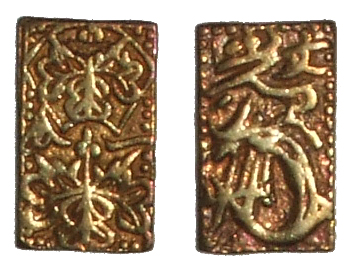
Genbun Ichibuban

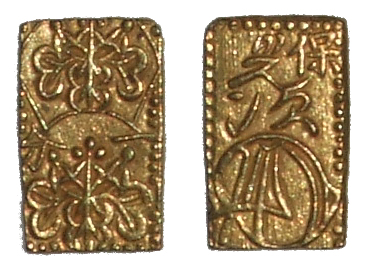
Bunsei Ichibuban

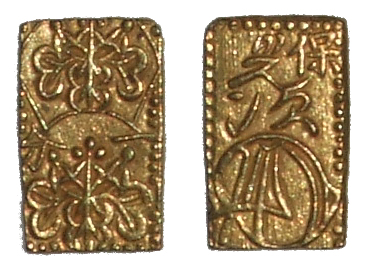
Tenpō Ichibuban

== See also ==
- Tokugawa coinage
