= Ōban =

Former currency of the Tokugawa system

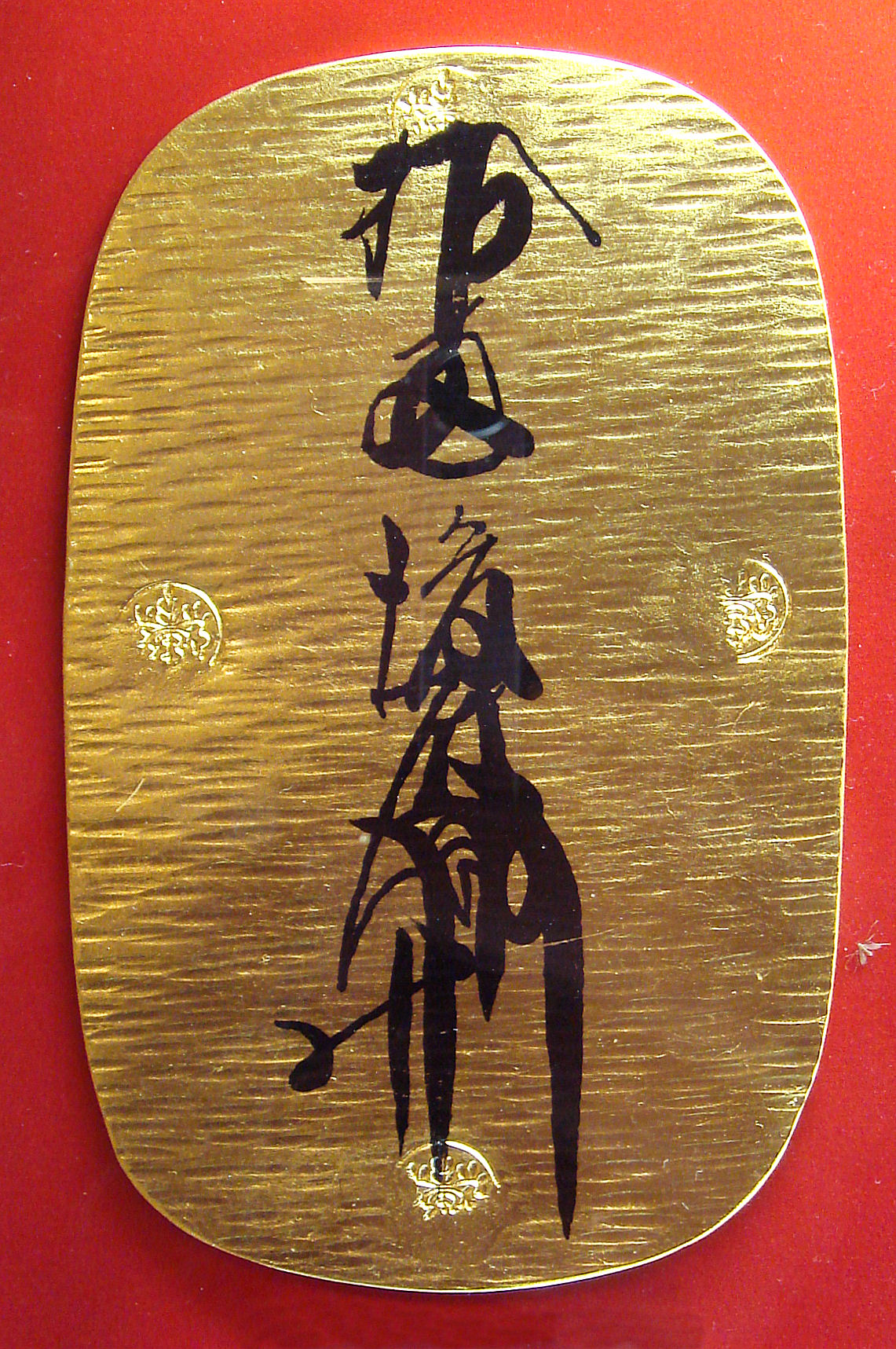
The Ōban (大判) was the largest denomination, valued at 10 Ryōs. Here, a Keichō Ōban, minted from 1601.

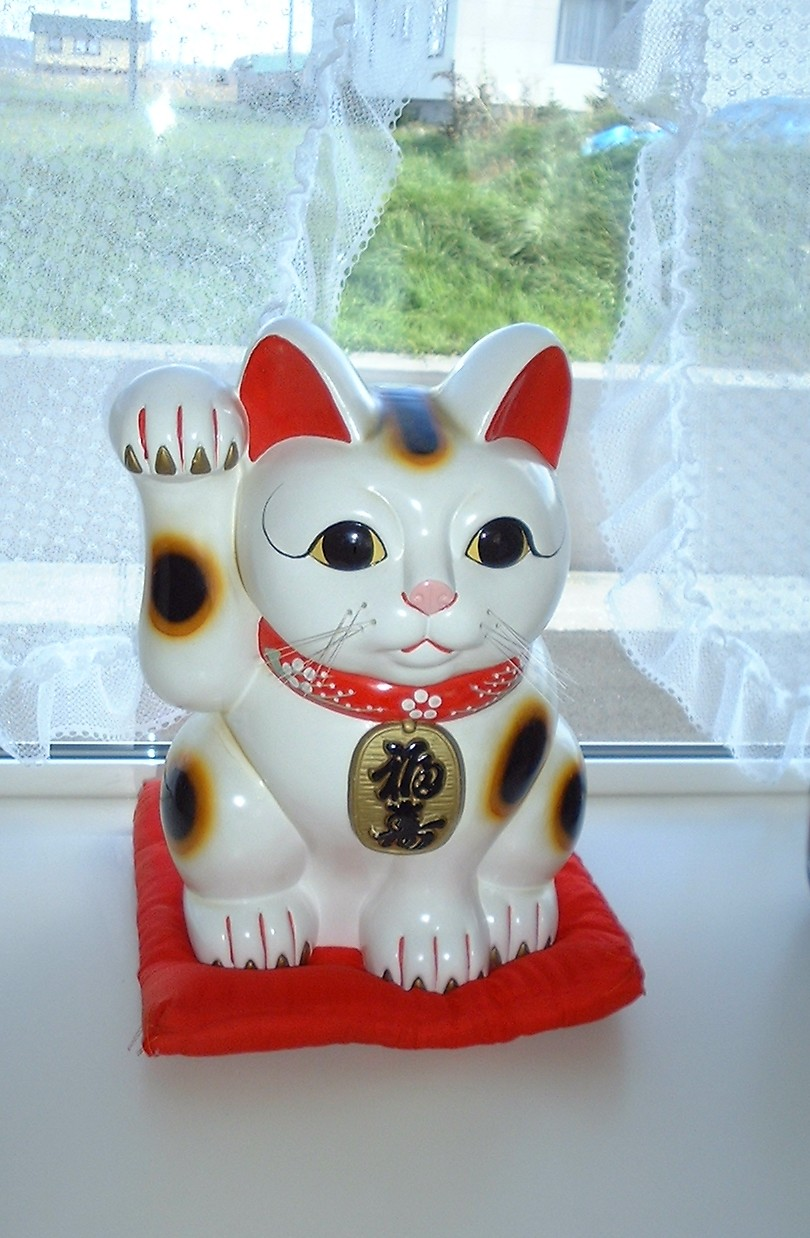
Maneki Neko, with Ōban attached to collar

An Ōban (大判) was a monetary ovoid gold plate, and the largest denomination of Tokugawa coinage. Tokugawa coinage worked according to a triple monetary standard, using gold, silver and bronze coins, each with their own denominations.

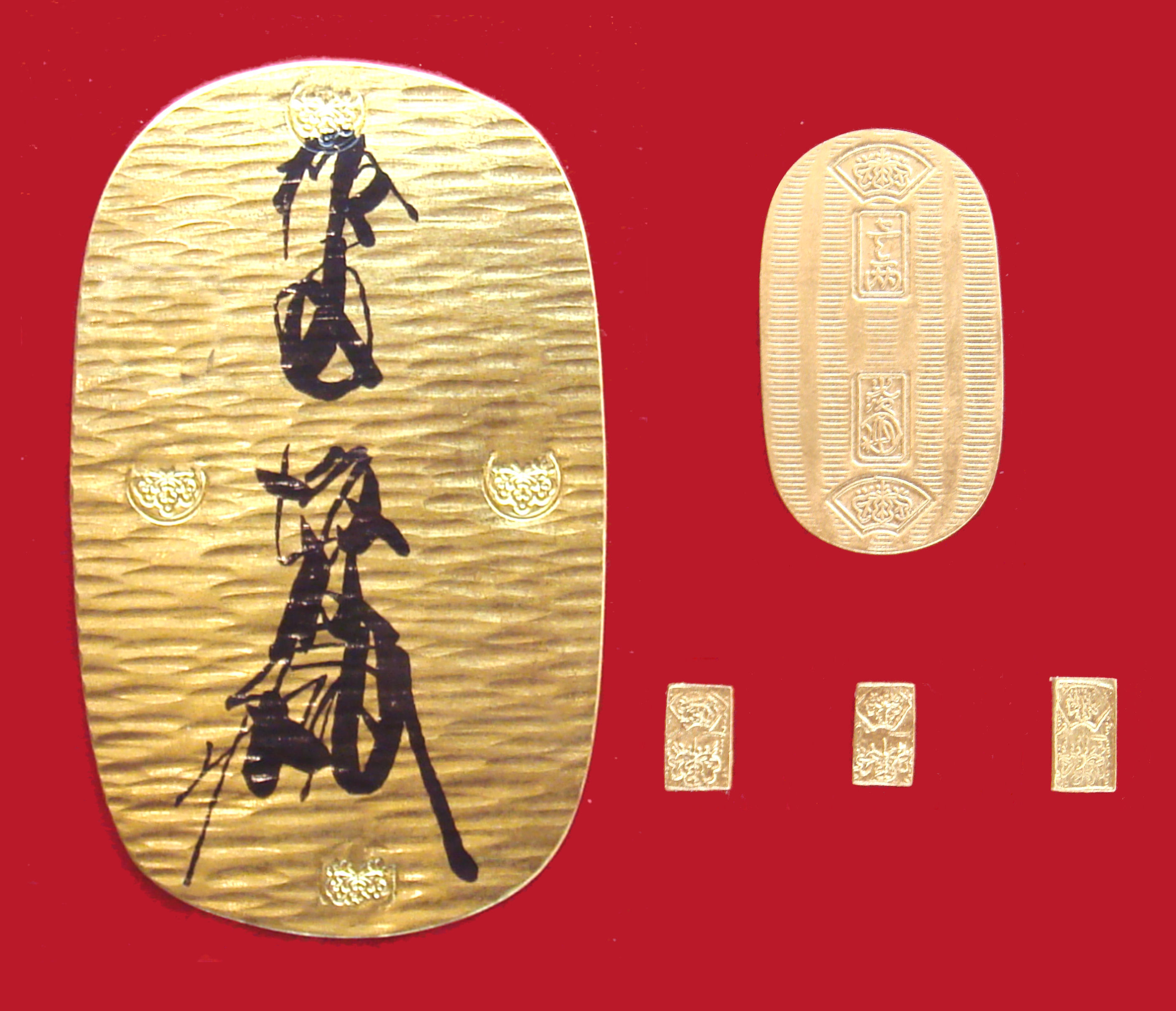
Keichō gold coinage: Ōban, Koban, Ichibuban, 1601–1695.

The first Oban – Tenshō Ōban (天正大判) – were minted by the Gotō family under the orders of Hideyoshi in 1588.

The Tenshō Ōban was equivalent to ten Ryōs, or ten Koban (小判) plates, with a weight of 165 g.
