= Keichō =

Period of Japanese history (1596–1615)

Keichō (慶長) was a Japanese era name (年号, nengō; "year name") after Bunroku and before Genna. This period spanned from October 1596 to July 1615. The reigning emperors were Go-Yōzei-tennō (後陽成天皇) and Go-Mizunoo-tennō (後水尾天皇).

== Change of era ==
- 1596 Keichō gannen (慶長元年): The era name was changed to Keichō to mark the passing of various natural disasters. The preceding era ended and a new one commenced on October 27 of the 5th Bunroku.

== Events of the Keichō era ==
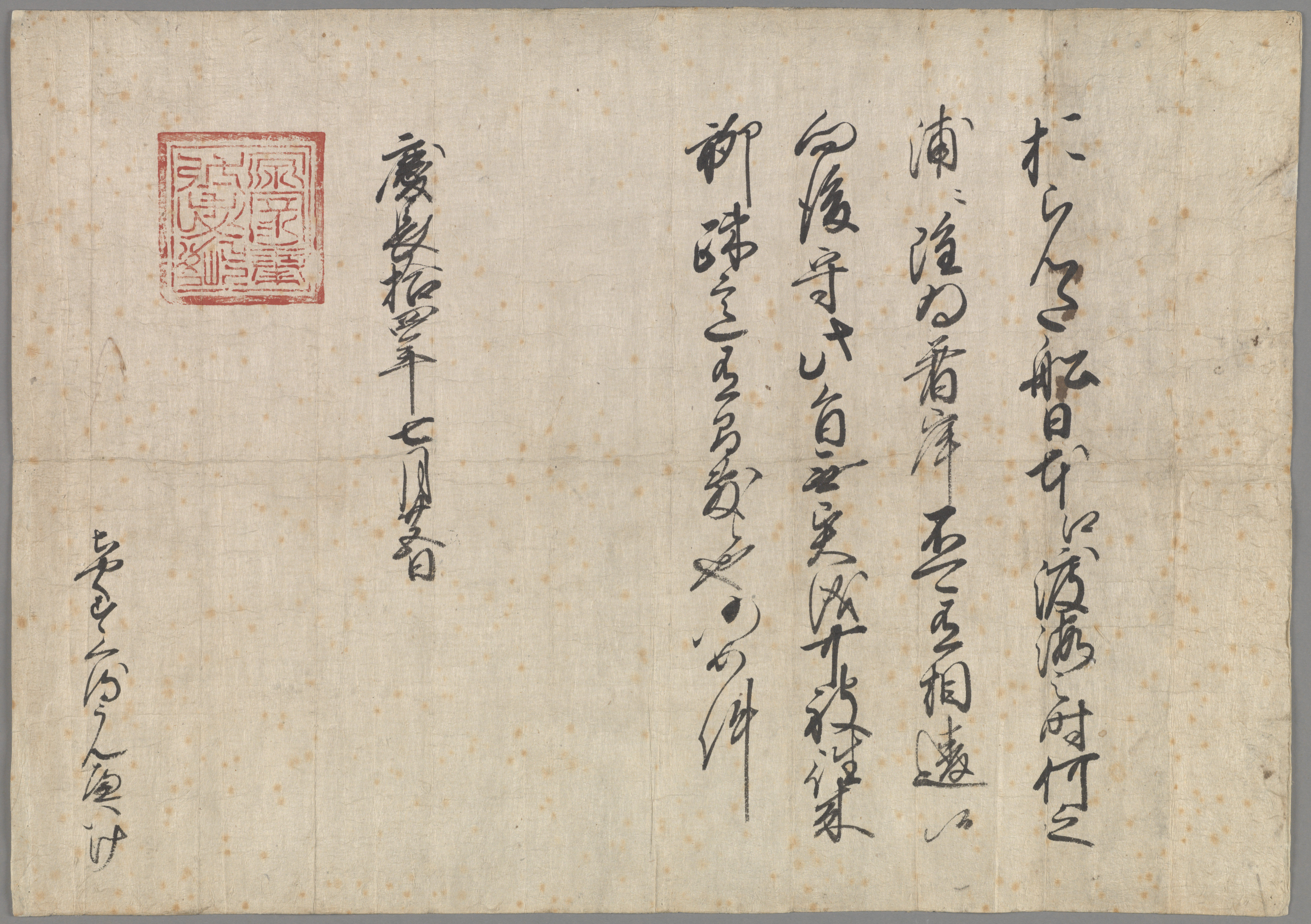
Trading pass issued in the name of Ieyasu Tokugawa, dated August 24, 1609 (Keichō 14, 25th day of the 6th month).

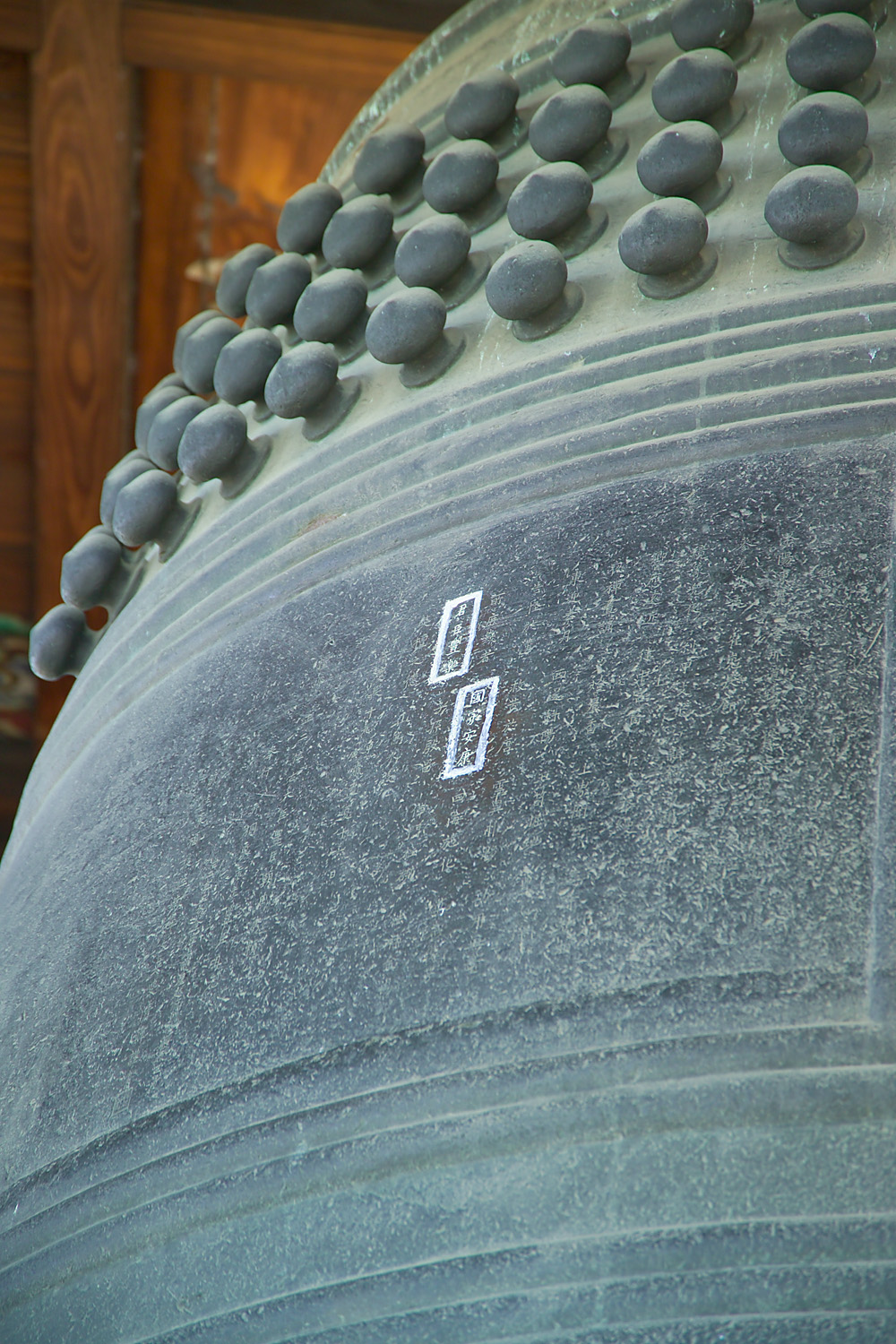
Temple bell at Hōkō-ji.

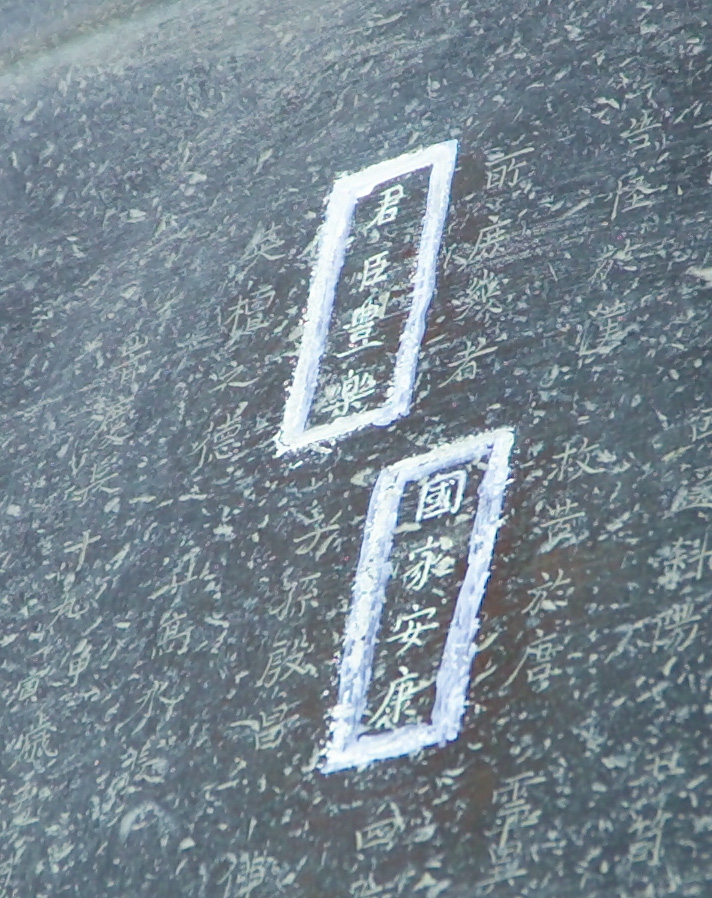
Inscription on bell at Hokoji in Kyoto

- 1596 (Keichō 1): Keichō Invasion (invasion of Korea).
- September 18, 1598 (Keichō 3, 18th day of the 8th month): Toyotomi Hideyoshi died in his Fushimi Castle at the age of 63.
- October 21, 1600 (Keichō 5, 15th day of the 9th month): Battle of Sekigahara. The Tokugawa clan and its allies decisively vanquish all opposition.
- January 15, 1602 (Keichō 7, 24th day of the 11th month): A fire at the Hōkō-ji temple complex in Kyoto was caused by careless workmen; and the great image of the buddha and the structure housing the statue (the Daibutsu-den) were consumed by the flames.
- 1603 (Keichō 8): Tokugawa Ieyasu became shōgun, which effectively becomes the beginning of what will become the Edo bakufu. Toyotomi Hideyori was elevated to Naidaijin in Miyako Daijō-kan.
- 1604-1606 (Keichō 9-11): Tokugawa Ieyasu undertook the rebuilding of Asama Shrine at the base of Mount Fuji in Suruga Province in fulfillment of a vow and in gratitude for the help of the kami during the Battle of Sekigahara in 1600.
- 1605 (Keichō 10): Tokugawa Hidetada was named successor shōgun after his father "retires" from the position of shōgun.
- 1605 (Keichō 10): The first official map of Japan was ordered in this year and completed in 1639 at a scale of 1:280,000.
- January 23, 1605 (Keichō 10, 15th day of the 12th month): A new volcanic island, Hachijōko-jima, arose from the sea at the side of Hachijō Island (八丈島,, Hachijō-jima) in the Izu Islands (伊豆諸島,, Izu-shotō) which stretch south and east from the Izu Peninsula.
- 1606 (Keichō 11): Construction began on Edo Castle.
- 1607 (Keichō 12): Construction began on Sunpu Castle in Suruga; and an ambassador from China arrived with greetings for the emperor of Japan.
- 1609 (Keichō 14): Invasion of Ryukyu by Shimazu daimyō of Satsuma.
- August 24, 1609 (Keichō 14, 25th day of the 6th month): Trading pass (handelpas) issued to Dutch East Indies Company in the name of Ieyasu Tokugawa.
- November 15, 1610 (Keichō 15, 30th day of the 9th month): Toyotomi Hideyori sponsors work which is begun to rebuild the Hōkō-ji in line with the plans which his father had supported; and this will include recreating the Daibutsu of Kyoto in bronze to replace the wooden image which had been burned. At this time, Hideyori also decides to order a great bell cast in bronze.
- May 20, 1610 (Keichō 15, 27th day of the 3rd month): Hideyori came to Kyoto to visit the former-shōgun Tokugawa Ieyasu; and the same day, the emperor resigns in favor of his son Masahito. Emperor Go-Yōzei abdicates; and his son receives the succession (senso).
- 1611 (Keichō 16): Emperor Go-Mizunoo formally accedes to the throne (sokui).
- 1613 (Keichō 18): In the years 1613 through 1620, Hasekura Tsunenaga headed a diplomatic mission to the Vatican in Rome, traveling through New Spain (arriving in Acapulco and departing from Veracruz) and visiting various ports-of-call in Europe. This historic mission is called the Keichō Embassy, (慶長使節). On the return trip, Hasekura and his companions re-traced their route across Mexico in 1619, sailing from Acapulco for Manilla, and then sailing north to Japan in 1620. This is conventionally considered the first Japanese ambassador in the Americas and in Europe.
- 1614 (Keichō 19): Siege of Osaka. The shōgun vanquished Hideyori and set fire to Osaka Castle, and then he returned for the winter to Edo.
- August 24, 1614 (Keichō 19, 19th day of the 7th month): A new bronze bell for the Hōkō-ji was cast successfully – see 19th century photo of Hōkō-ji belland see old photo of bell; but despite dedication ceremony planning, Ieyasu forbade any further actions concerning the great bell:

"[T]he tablet over the Daibatsu-den and the bell bore the inscription "Kokka ankō" (meaning "the country and the house, peace and tranquility"), and at this Tokugawa Ieyasu affected to take umbrage, alleging that it was intended as a curse on him for the character 安 (an, "peace") was placed between the two characters composing his own name 家康 ("ka-kō", "house tranquility") [suggesting subtly perhaps that peace could only be attained by Ieyasu's dismemberment?] ... This incident of the inscription was, of course, a mere pretext, but Ieyasu realized that he could not enjoy the power he had usurped as long as Hideyori lived, and consequently, although the latter more than once dispatched his kerei Katagiri Kastumoto to Sunpu Castle with profuse apologies, Ieyasu refused to be placated."

- October 18, 1614 (Keichō 19, 25th day of the 10th month): A strong earthquake shook Kyoto.
- 1615 (Keichō 20): Osaka Summer Battle begins.

=== Era developments ===
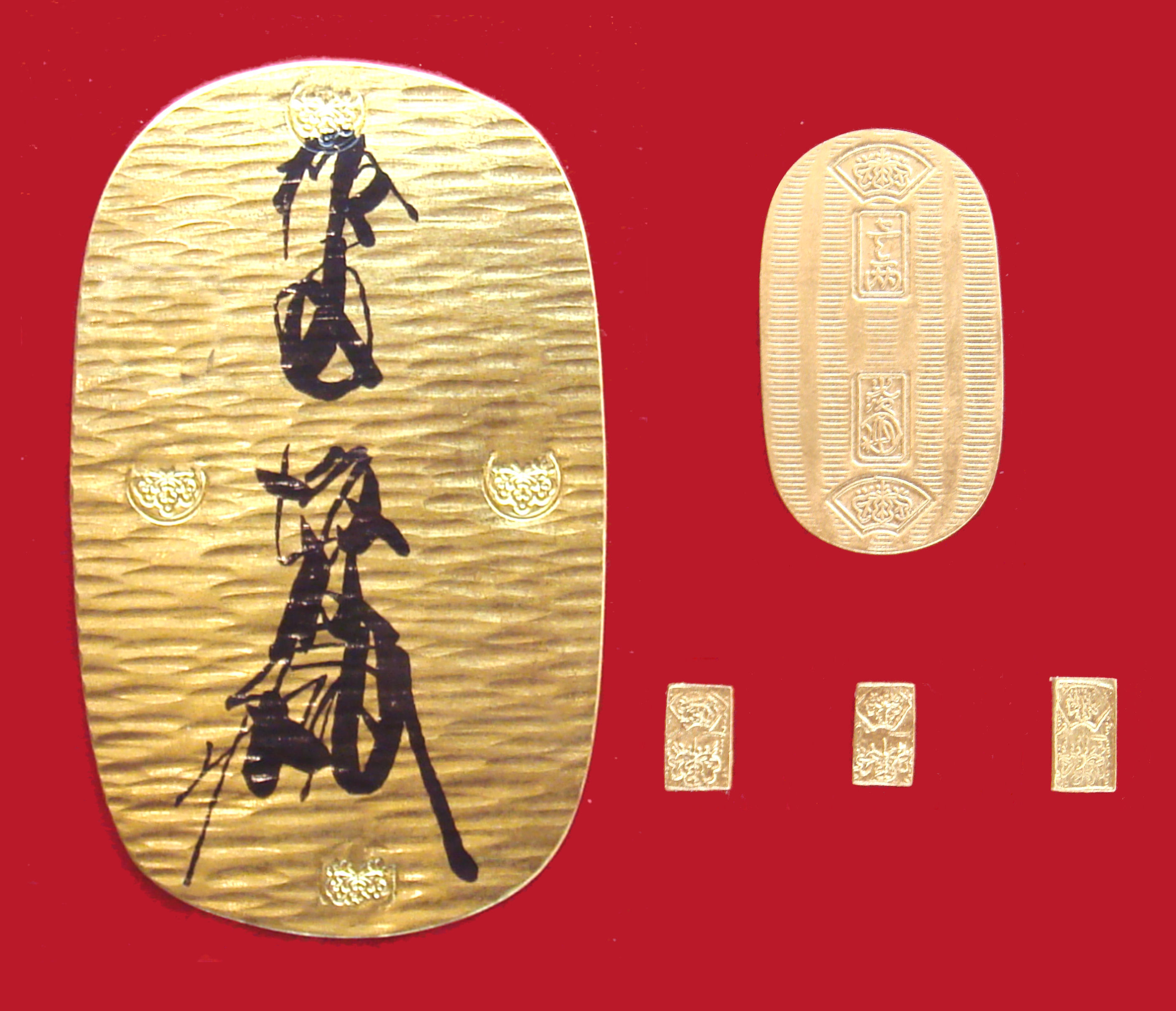
Keichō gold coinage: Ōban, Koban, Ichibuban (1601–1695)

- Copper, silver and gold coins called Keichō-tsūhō were issued in the Keichō era helping to unify the currency system.
- Keichō-chokuhan, also called Keichō shinkoku-bon, were Imperial publications, produced during the Keichō era at the command of Emperor Go-Yōzei and printed using moveable type which had been imported from the Joseon Kingdom on the Korean peninsula.
- Keichō no katsuji-ban was the general name for the first works printed with moveable typ during the Keichō era.
- Things Heard and Seen During the Keichō Era (Keichō kemmon-shū) also called the Kembun-shū was a book, a collection of tales and anecdotes compiled by Miura Jōshin (1565–1644).

== Notes ==
Preceded by Bunroku (文禄)	Era or nengō Keichō (慶長); 1596–1615	Succeeded by Genna (元和)
