= Man'en =

Period of Japanese history (1860–1861)

Man'en (万延) was a Japanese era name (年号, nengō, lit. "year name") after Ansei and before Bunkyū. This period spanned the years from March 1860 through February 1861. The reigning emperor was Kōmei-tennō (孝明天皇).

== Change of era ==
- March 18, 1860 (Man'en 1 (万延元年)): The new era name was created to mark the destruction caused by a fire at Edo Castle and the assassination of Ii Naosuke (also known as "the disturbance" or "the incident" at the Sakurada-mon). The previous era ended and a new one commenced in Ansei 7.

The new era name is derived from an hortatory aphorism to be found in The Book of the Later Han: "With 100,000,000,000 descendants, your name will forever be recorded" (豊千億之子孫、歴万載而永延).

== Events of the Man'en era ==
- 1860 (Man'en 1): First Western professional photographer to establish residence in Japan, Orrin Freeman began living in Yokohama
- 1860 (Man'en 1): First foreign mission to the United States.

== Gallery ==
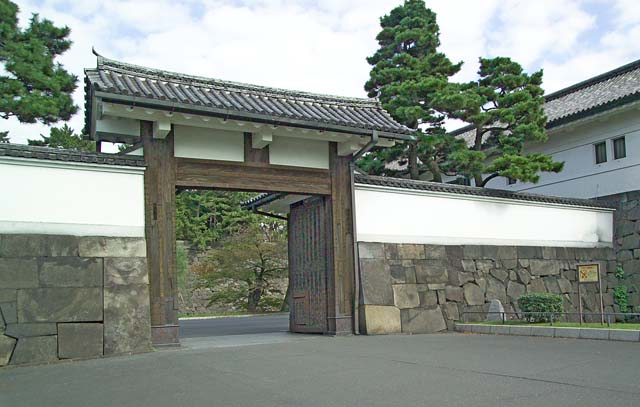
Edo Castle's Sakurada Gate (Sakurada-mon): The assassination of Ii Naosuke occurred nearby.

== See also ==
- Sesquicentennial of Japanese Embassy to the United States

== Notes ==
Preceded by Ansei (安政)	Era or nengō Man'en (万延); 18 March 1860 – 29 March 1861	Succeeded by Bunkyū (文久)
