= Ryō =

Obsolete Japanese currency

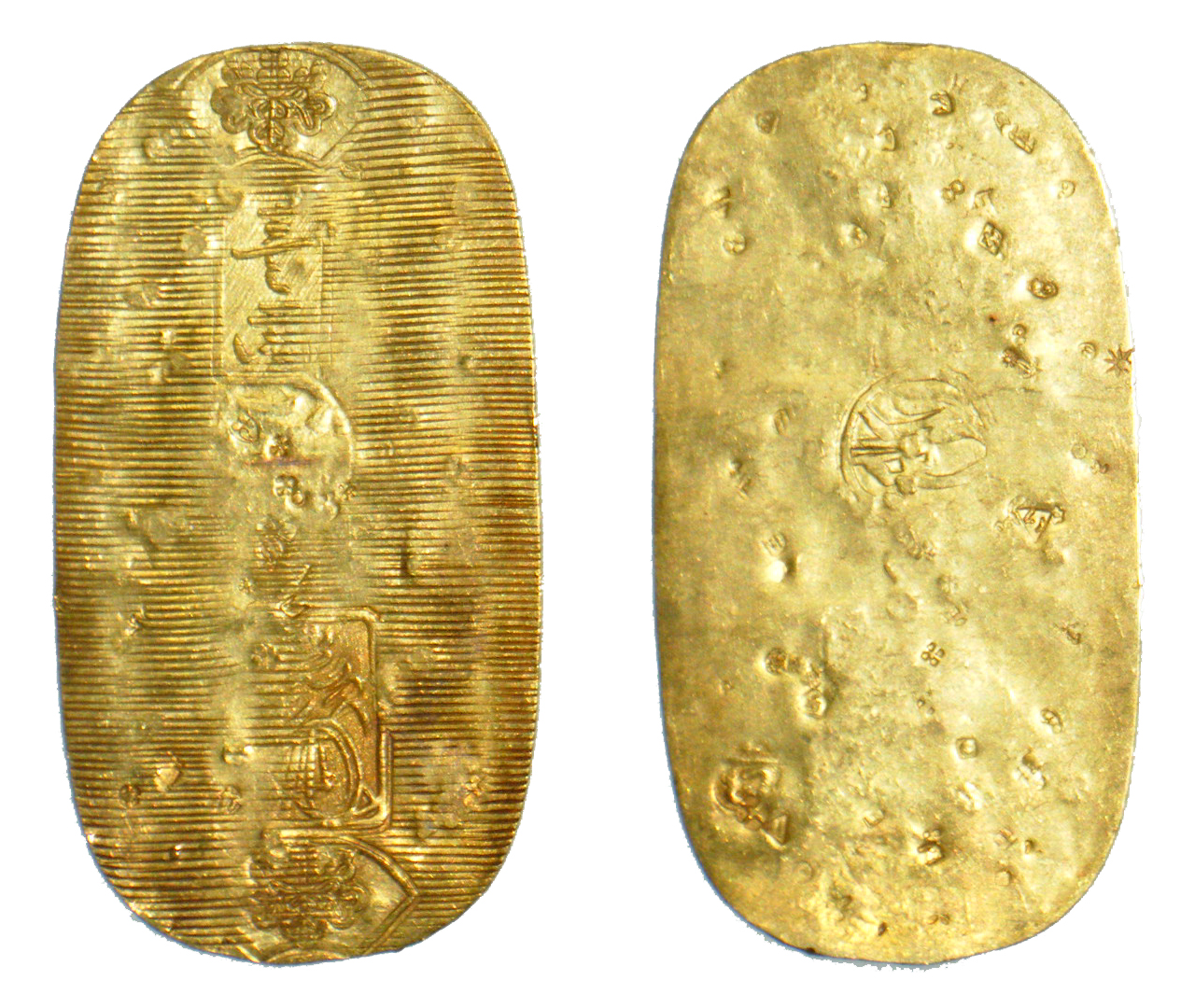
- Keichō-period koban with value of one ryō

Units of account
- Base unit: ryō

The ryō (両) was a gold currency unit in the shakkanhō system in pre-Meiji Japan. It was eventually replaced with a system based on the yen.

== Origins ==
The ryō was originally a unit of weight from China, the liang or tael. It came into use in Japan during the Kamakura period. By the Azuchi–Momoyama period it had become nearly uniform throughout Japan, about 4.4 monme as a unit of weight (about the same as 16.5 grams).

During the Sengoku period, various local daimyō began to mint their own money. One of the best known and most prestigious of these private coins was the kōshūkin (甲州金; "coin/gold of the Kōshū Province") issued by warlord Takeda Shingen, who had substantial gold deposits within his territories. The value of the kōshūkin was based on its weight, with one kōshūkin equal to one ryō of gold, and thus stamped with its weight (about 15 grams). The exchange rate fluctuated. A ryō of gold was worth 3 kan (3000) copper coins around the 1530s, or early Tenbun era but fell to only somewhat stronger than the later fixed notion of "1000 mon" (copper coins), i.e., 1 ryō = 1.2–1.6 kan, by late Tenshō era, or end of century.

== Tokugawa period ==
The Tokugawa shogunate attempted to create a central currency, based on gold, silver and copper units all exchangeable at fixed rates. Oblong gold coins, called koban, were minted with one koban containing about one ryō of gold, so that koban carried a face value of one ryō. The official rate was set in 1609 at one ryō equal to 50 monme (approx 187 grams) of silver, or 4000 brass coins. However, in reality the relative values between gold, silver and brass currencies fluctuated on an almost daily basis throughout the Edo period.

In 1695 the government decided to increase the amount of metal money in circulation by debasement. As a result, the ryō as a unit of weight of gold and the ryō as the face value of the koban were no longer synonymous. The Keichō koban issued after the monetary reform of May 1601 offered approximately 17.9 grams gold with fineness of 84–87%. The Genroku koban issued in 1695 still weighed around 17.9 grams; however its gold content was reduced to 57%. The Hōei koban of 1706 returned to the original fineness; however, the size was much reduced and it had little more than half the metal value of the Keichō koban. In 1700 the official exchange rate was adjusted to 1 ryō equal to 60 monme silver (225 grams) or 4000 brass coins. Tokugawa Yoshimune further conducted a reform to stimulate the economy and raise prices in 1736, again lowering the gold content of the koban.

One ryō was also considered equivalent to 1 koku of rice, or the amount of rice needed to feed one person for one year, although this was a less exact standard, which fluctuated depending on the abundance of the rice crop in any particular year.

On June 27, 1871, with the introduction of currency reforms after the Meiji Restoration, the ryō was abolished, and replaced one-for-one with the Yen.

== Modern conversion ==
These fluctuations in the gold content of the koban over time, as well as differences in the cost of living between various points in the Edo period and in modern times make any attempt to relate the value of one ryō in terms of modern currency very difficult. Japanese middle school textbooks often state that one ryō was approximately equivalent to 100,000 Yen at the start of the Edo period, and around 3000–4000 yen at the end of the Edo period. On the other hand, the Currency Museum of the Bank of Japan states that one ryō had a nominal value equivalent 300,000–400,000 yen, but was worth only 120,000–130,000 yen in practice, or 40,000 yen in terms of rice.

== Sinogram ==
As an independent sinogram, 両 is one of the kyōiku kanji, a jōyō kanji taught in elementary school in Japan. It is a third-grade kanji and also means “both”.

== See also ==
- Koban (coin)
- Momme (unit)
- Japanese mon (currency)
- Wadōkaichin
