= Ansei =

Period of Japanese history (1854–1860)

Ansei (安政) was a Japanese era name (年号, nengō; "year name") after Kaei and before Man'en. This period spanned the years from November 1854 through March 1860. The reigning emperor was Kōmei-tennō (孝明天皇).

== Change of era ==
- November 27, 1854 (Ansei gannen (安政元年)): The new era name of Ansei (meaning "tranquil government") was created to herald the beginning of a peaceful period. The impetus and explanation for this change of era names was said to have been the burning of the Palace in Kyoto in the preceding summer.

The new era name was derived from an hortatory aphorism: "Rule peacefully over the masses, then the ruler will remain in his place" (庶民安政、然後君子安位矣).

Although the notion seems appealing, the arrival of the Black Ships and Commodore Matthew C. Perry is not specifically recognized as a factor in the change of era names.

== Events of the Ansei era ==
- 1854 (Ansei 1): The Ansei-Tōkai Quake (安政東海地震, Ansei Tōkai Jishin) was an 8.4 magnitude earthquake which struck on December 23, 1854. The epicenter ranged from Suruga Bay to the deep ocean, and struck primarily in the Tōkai region, but destroyed houses as far away as in Edo. The accompanying tsunami caused damage along the entire coast from the Bōsō Peninsula in modern-day Chiba Prefecture to Tosa Province (modern-day Kōchi Prefecture)
- 1854 (Ansei 1): The Ansei-Nankai Quake (安政南海地震, Ansei Nankai Jishin) was an 8.4 magnitude earthquake which struck on December 24, 1854. Over 10,000 people from the Tōkai region down to Kyushu were killed.
- 1855 (Ansei 2): Work was begun on re-constructing the Imperial Palace after the devastating fire of Kaei 7, and the project was completed in nine months.
- 1855 (Ansei 2, 21st day of the 11th month): The emperor moved into the reconstructed palace, having previously lived in the Shōgo-in and then Katsura-no-miya. The people were permitted to view the grand Imperial progress.
- November 11, 1855 (Ansei 2): 1855 Edo earthquake, one of the Ansei great earthquakes, with resulting fire damage and loss of life. Epicenter – (Latitude: 36.000/Longitude: 140.000), 6.9 magnitude on the Richter Scale.
- November 15, 1857 (Ansei 4): Nagasaki Medical School is opened. Dr. Pompe van Meerdevoort gave the first formal public lecture on medical and surgical sciences at the new school, which became as well the first such lecture to be delivered in any Japanese venue.
- 1858–1860 (Ansei 5-Ansei 7): Cholera outbreak is believed to have killed between 100,000 and 200,000 people in Edo alone.
- April 9, 1858 (Ansei 5): The 1858 Hietsu earthquake kills hundreds.
- 1858 (Ansei 5): The initial establishment of Keio University, seven years before the beginning of the Keio era; nevertheless, the university was named after the later era. This is the oldest existing institution of higher learning in Japan.
- July 29, 1859 (Ansei 5): Tairō Ii Naosuke signs Japanese-American Treaty of Amity and Commerce (also known as the "Harris Treaty"), which was a follow-up to the 1854 Treaty of Kanagawa.
- 1858 (Ansei 5): Beginning of Ansei Purge at the order of Ii Naosuke on behalf of the bakufu.
- 1860 (Ansei 7): Fire at Edo Castle.

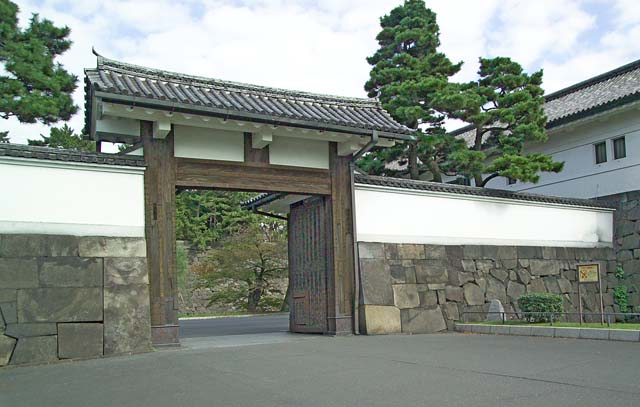
Edo Castle's Sakurada Gate (Sakurada-mon): The assassination of Ii Naosuke occurred nearby.

- March 24, 1860 (Man'en 1): Ii Naosuke was assassinated, also known as the "Sakurada-mon Incident"

== See also ==
- Ansei Treaties

== Notes ==
Preceded by Kaei (嘉永)	Era or nengō Ansei (安政); 27 November 1854 – 17 March 1860	Succeeded by Man'en (万延)
