= Bunsei =

Period of Japanese history (1818–1830)

Bunsei (文政) was a Japanese era name (年号, nengō; "year name") after Bunka and before Tenpō. This period spanned the years from April 1818 through December 1830. The reigning emperor was Ninkō-tennō (仁孝天皇).

== Change of era ==
- April 22, 1818 (Bunsei gannen (文政元年)): The new era name was created to mark the enthronement of the emperor Emperor Ninko in Bunka 15.

The new era name was drawn from an aphorism attributed to the ancient Chinese emperor, Great Shun (大舜): "Shun reads the Heavens, and so brings together all seven governments" (舜察天文、斉七政).

== Events of the Bunsei era ==
- 1822 (Bunsei 5): Edo was struck with 150 earthquake tremors over three days.
- August 11, 1823 (Bunsei 6, 6th day of the 7th month): German flora- and fauna-taxonomist Philipp Franz von Siebold arrives at Dejima as new physician for the Dutch trading post in Nagasaki harbor. Bakufu policy in this era was designed to marginalize the influence of foreigners in Bunsei Japan; however, an unintended and opposite consequence of sakoku was to enhance the value and significance of a very small number of thoughtful observers like von Siebold, whose writings document what he learned or discovered first-hand. Von Siebold's published accounts and unpublished writings provided a unique and useful perspective for Orientalists and Japanologists in the 19th century; and his work continues to be rigorously examined by modern researchers today.
- August 13, 1830 (Bunsei 13, 25th day of the 6th month): Earthquake at Kyoto (Latitude: 35.000/Longitude: 136.000), no Richter Scale magnitude suggested by available data.

== Notes ==
Preceded by Bunka (文化)	Era or nengō Bunsei (文政); 1818–1830	Succeeded by Tenpō (天保)
