= Tenpō =

Period of Japanese history (1830–1844)

Tenpō (天保) was a Japanese era name (年号, nengō; "year name") after Bunsei and before Kōka. The period spanned from December 1830 through December 1844. The reigning emperor was Ninko-tennō (仁孝天皇).

== Introduction ==
=== Change of era ===
- December 10, 1830 (Tenpō gannen (天保元年)) : In the 13th year of Bunsei, the new era name of Tenpō (meaning "Heavenly Imperial Protection") was created to mark the disasters of a great fire in Edo and an earthquake at Kyoto. The new era name was created from an hortatory aphorism: "Respect and worship the Ways of heaven. Eternally keep the Mandate of Heaven" (欽崇天道、永保天命).

The Tenpō era is often described as the beginning of the end of bakufu government. Though the era accomplished much through its reforms, and also culturally speaking, the injury inflicted on the Tokugawa system of government during the Tenpō period was unparalleled. Public order and dissatisfaction with government was a main issue, but the bakufu was not entirely at fault for the stir amongst the people. For example, the failure of crops in 1833, which soon became a lengthy disaster endured for over four years and was called the Great Tenpō famine. It was caused mainly by poor weather conditions. Because crops could not grow under these circumstances, prices began to skyrocket. These dire circumstances sparked many rebellions and riots across Japan over the course of the Tenpō years. Weary and desperate for someone to blame, the people rose up against the government, and Ōshio Heihachirō, known for leading one of the largest rebellions, made a statement to implicate "the natural disasters as sure signs of Heavens's discontent with the government". Mizuno Tadakuni's reforms were meant to remedy these economic issues, but the reforms could not rescue the bakufu from its ultimate collapse.

The shogunate rule during the Tenpō era was that of Tokugawa Ieyoshi, the 12th shōgun' of the bakufu government. His reign lasted from 1837 to 1853. During this time, many factors appeared to have seen to the decline of his health: namely, the great and devastating famine, the many rebellions rising up against the bakufu, and the swift advance of foreign influence.

== Great Tenpō Famine ==
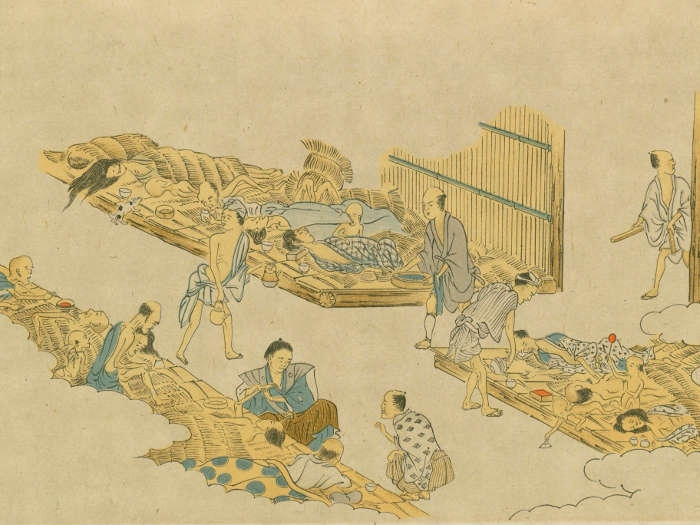
Tenpō famine

The Great Tenpō famine of the 1830s was a devastating period in which the whole of Japan, but especially Honshu, experienced a sudden decrease in temperature and loss of crops, and in turn, merchant prices began to spike. Many starved to death during this grim time: "The death rate for a village in the northeast rose to thirty-seven per thousand and that for the city of Takayama was nearly forty-five". As crops continued to decline in the countryside, prices increased, and a shortage of supplies left people competing to survive on meager funds. The rising expense of rice in particular, a staple food of the Japanese, was a firm blow to both the economy and the people, who starved because of it. Some even resorted to "eating leaves and weeds, or even straw raincoats".

The samurai also suffered the effects of the famine, dealing with lower wages from the Japanese domain governments in anticipation of fiscal shortfalls to come. To further the already dire conditions of the famine, illness eventually began to spread, and many who were starving could not resist pestilences such as smallpox, measles and influenza. Thousands died from hunger alone at the peak of the crisis in 1836–1837.

== Rebellion ==
One of the rebellions sparked by the Great Tenpō famine was the Ōshio Heihachirō Rebellion. The man for whom it was named led an attempted revolt in the 1830s, and was granted the label of yonaoshi daimyojin, or "world saviour", for his attempts at moral restoration. Formally a police officer and scholar, Ōshio Heihachirō (1792-1837) had requested help from Osaka city commissioners and otherwise wealthy merchants in 1837, only to be met with indifference. Shocked by his lack of success in the endeavour, Ōshio instigated an uprising to oppose those who had refused their aid. With approximately 300 followers, including poor townsfolk and peasants from various villages, Ōshio set fire to one-fifth of Osaka city. But the rebellion was suppressed in short order, forcing Ōshio to a quick end in which he committed suicide.

The scholar Ikuta Yorozo (1801–1837) also instigated a rebellion from similar roots as that of Ōshio Heihachirō. Ikuta had opened a school for the education of adolescents, consisting mostly of peasants. Having also suffered from the Great Tenpō Famine, Ikuta despaired the lack of aid local bureaucrats were willing to provide, and in 1837, he assembled a band of peasants in retaliation. Together they launched an attack on the bureaucrats, which met with devastating results and ended with Ikuta taking his own life.

== Ogata Kōan and Tekijuku ==
In 1838, a year following Ōshio Heihachirō's rebellion, and after the fire that had scorched nearly a quarter of Osaka city, the physician Ogata Kōan founded an academy to teach medicine, healing and Rangaku, or Dutch Studies. The school was called Tekijuku, where distinction of status was unknown and competition abounded. Ogata encouraged this competitive learning, especially of the Dutch language to which he had dedicated much of his own study. However, the competition escalated and eventually students bent to the rigorous pressure of the academy, acting recklessly to vent frustrations. For example: "slashing their swords against the central pillar of the main boarding hall, leaving gashes and nicks". Ogata did not deem it necessary to take disciplinary measures, thinking it harmless and recreational.

Much of Ogata's life was devoted to Rangaku, which was clearly displayed in the vision he had for Tekijuku. Ogata is known in history for his attentions to the medical, or internal therapeutic aspects of Rangaku, including emphasis on diseases and his aid in translation of foreign medical terms.

== Restriction of foreign influence ==
=== Morrison incident ===
In 1837, upon rescuing several stranded Japanese sailors, an American merchant ship called the Morrison endeavoured to return them to their homeland, hoping this venture would earn them the right to trade with Japan. However, the merchant ship was fired upon as it entered Japanese seas due to the Edict to Repel Foreign Vessels passed by Japan in 1825. This was later referred to as the Morrison incident.

However, there were some in Japan who criticized the government's actions, namely the Bangaku Shachu a band of rangaku scholars who advocated a more open approach to the outside, perhaps to the extent of ending Japan's long-standing sakoku policy. This stance against the shogunate riled the government into the Bansha no goku, arresting twenty-six members of the Bangaku Shachu, and reinforcing the policies on foreign education by limiting the publication of books, in addition to making access to materials for Dutch Studies increasingly difficult.

== Tenpō Reforms ==
As the Tokugawa era drew to a close, a major reform was exerted called the Tenpō Reforms (1841–1843), primarily instituted by Mizuno Tadakuni, a dominant leader in the shogunate. The reforms were economic policies introduced prominently to resolve fiscal issues mainly caused by the Great Tenpō famine, and to revisit more traditional aspects of the Japanese economy. For the samurai, these reforms were meant to spur them to return to their roots of education and military arts. The samurai aimed for change within the status quo itself. There was a stringency amongst all classes of people, and at this time, travel was regulated (especially for farmers, who were meant to remain at home and work their fields) and trade relations crumbled. This, in turn, caused various goods to lower in price. Under Mizuno's leadership, the reforms brought about the following: "Moral reform, the encouragement of frugality and retrenchment, recoinage, forced loans from wealthy merchant houses, and the cancellation of samurai debts". In addition, the bakufu met with fierce objection when land transfers were impressed upon the daimyōs in an attempt to reinforce the reach of influence and authority that remained of the Tokugawa government.

Though the reforms largely ended in failure, the introduction of economical change during this period is seen as the initial approach leading ultimately to the modernization of Japan's economy.

== Fires at Edo Castle ==
Edo Castle was devastated by two fires during the Tenpō era, in 1839 and 1843 respectively, and despite rampant rebellion during this period, neither fire was due to unrest.

== Other events of the Tenpō era ==
- 1834 (Tenpō 5): Kondō Isami born in Tama.
- July 20, 1835 (Tenpō 6, 7th day of the 6th month): Earthquake in Sanriku (Latitude: 37.900/Longitude: 141.900), 7.6 magnitude on the Richter Scale.
  - Hijikata Toshizō born, May 5.
- 1836 (Tenpō 7): Matsudaira Katamori born in Edo.
- 1837 (Tenpō 7): Tokugawa Ieyoshi becomes the 12th shōgun of the bakufu government.
- 1837 (Tenpō 8): Tokugawa Yoshinobu born.
- April 25, 1843 (Tenpō 14, 25th day of the 3rd month): Earthquake in Yezo, Kushiro, Nemuro (Latitude: 41.800/Longitude: 144.800), 8.4 magnitude on the Richter Scale.
- 1844 (Tenpō 15): Insurrection in Chōshū; also, Saitō Hajime born in Edo.

=== Calendar revision ===
During the Tenpō era, Koide Shuke translated portions of Jérôme Lalande's work on astronomy. Koide presented this work to the Astronomy Board as evidence of the superiority of the European calendar, but the effort produced no identifiable effect. However, Koide's work and translations of other Western writers did indirectly affect the Tenpō calendar revision in 1842–1844. A great many errors had been found in the lunar calendar; and a revised system was publicly adopted in 1844. The new calendar was called the Tenpō-Jinin calendar. It was in use in Japan until 1872 when the Gregorian calendar was adopted.

== Gallery ==
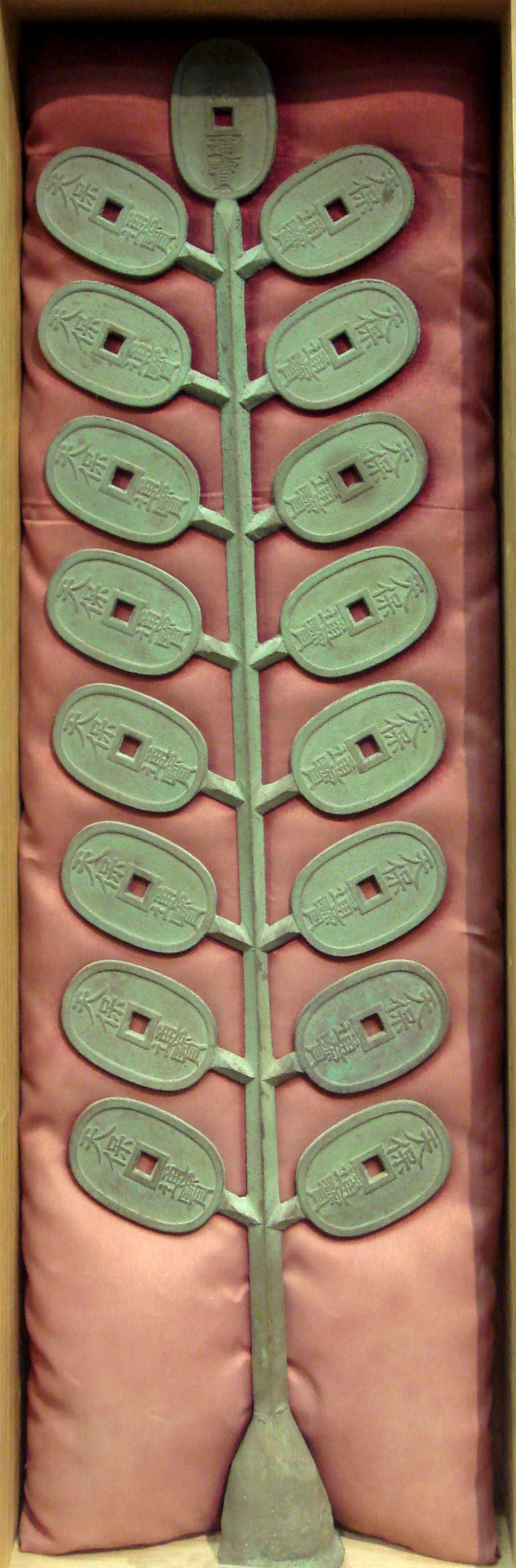
Branched ("Edasen" 枝銭) Mon coins of the Tenpō period.

Japanese drawing of the Morrison, anchored in front of Uraga in 1837.

== See also ==
- Tenpō calendar
- Tenpō Reforms

== Notes ==
Preceded by Bunsei (文政)	Era or nengō Tenpō (天保); 1830–1844	Succeeded by Kōka (弘化)
