= Satō Issai =

Japanese Confucian scholar

- A portrait of Satoh Issai by Watanabe Kazan.jpg Satō Issai by Watanabe Kazan

Satō Issai (佐藤一斎, November 14, 1772 - October 19, 1859) was a Confucian scholar in late Edo to Bakumatsu period Japan.

== Biography ==
Satō was the second son of Satō Nobuyoshi, a samurai in the service of Iwamura Domain, a minor (20,000 koku) domain with holdings in Mino and Suruga Provinces. He was born in the domain's shimoyashiki ('lower residence') in Nihonbashi, Edo, and subsequently followed in his father's footsteps in service of the domain in 1790. In 1793, Matsudaira Norihira, the third son of the daimyō of Iwamura was adopted by the Hayashi clan, the Confucian advisors to the Tokugawa shogunate, taking the name of Hayashi Jussai. Satō was assigned to accompany him as his valet, and also entered the Shōheizaka Gakumonjo school for Confucian studies. He was a quick learner, and by 1805 had risen to the position of head of the school and was recognized as a Confucian master with many of his own disciples. Following the death of Hayashi Jussai in 1841, he was appointed as chairman of the school. Satō taught the orthodox Cheng–Zhu school of Neo-Confucianism which was favored by the shogunate, but he was also instrumental in the spread of Yangmingism, which became an influence on the incipient Sonnō jōi anti-foreigner movement in 19th-century Japan and was an integral part of the ideologies behind the Meiji Restoration.

Over time, Satō had 3,000 students, including Sakuma Shōzan, Watanabe Kazan, Yokoi Shōnan, Nakamura Masanao and many other figures who were highly influential in Bakumatsu-period Japan. In 1854, he assisted Hayashi Akira (the sixth son of Hayashi Jussai) in the negotiations which concluded in the Convention of Kanagawa between Japan and the United States which effectively ended Japan's centuries-old national isolation policy.

Satō died at the age of 88. His granddaughter was the mother-in-law of historian Taguchi Ukichi. Another granddaughter married a businessman, Yoshida Kenzō, and became the adopted mother of Prime Minister of Japan Shigeru Yoshida.

Satō's grave is at the temple of Jinko-ji in Roppongi, Tokyo. The grave was designated a National Historic Site in 1949. However, it is not open to the public.
