= Kaei =

Period of Japanese history (1848–1854)

Kaei (嘉永) was a Japanese era name (年号, nengō; lit. "year name") after Kōka and before Ansei. This period spanned the years from February 1848 through November 1854. The reigning emperor was Kōmei-tennō (孝明天皇).

== Change of era ==
- February 28, 1848 Kaei gannen (嘉永元年): The era name of Kaei (meaning "eternal felicity") was created to mark the beginning of the reign of the Emperor Kōmei.

The era name is derived from an aphorism in the Book of Song: "A wise Emperor receives much help, One who esteems comfort is on the outside" (思皇享多祐、嘉楽永無央).

== Events of the Kaei Era ==
- July 1848 (Kaei 1): Ranald MacDonald, (b. 1824, Astoria, Oregon) left the whaler Plymouth in a small boat and landed on Rishiri Island. He was arrested and sent from Rishiri to Nagasaki where he was incarcerated; MacDonald began teaching English to 14 scholars, including Einosuke Moriyama, who later became an interpreter for the Japanese government when Matthew C. Perry entered Japan in 1854 (thus, in Japan, MacDonald is regarded as "The first native-speaking English teacher in Japanese history).
- 1849 (Kaei 2): Medical practice of vaccination introduced by Dutch physician, Dr. Mohnike, at Dejima.
- July 1853 (Kaei 6): Commodore Matthew Perry, commanding the United States Navy's East Indies fleet, arrives in Japanese waters with four ships.
- 1854 (Kaei 7): Commodore Perry returns to Edo Bay to force Japanese agreement to the Treaty of Kanagawa; and the chief Japanese negotiator was Daigaku-no kami Hayashi Akira (1800–1859), who was head of the Tokugawa bakufu's neo-Confucian academy in Edo, the Shōhei-kō (Yushima Seidō).

"Immediately, on signing and exchanging copies of the treaty, Commodore Perry presented the first commissioner, Prince Hayashi, with an American flag stating that this gift was the highest expression of national courtesy and friendship he could offer. The prince was deeply moved, and expressed his gratitude with evident feeling. The commodore next presented the other commissioners with gifts he had especially reserved for them. All business now having been concluded to the satisfaction of both delegations, the Japanese commissioners invited Perry and his officers to enjoy a feast and entertainment especially prepared for the celebration." -- from American eyewitness account of the event

- May 2, 1854 (Kaei 7, the 6th day of the 4th month): Fire broke out in the Sentō, and the conflagration spread to the Imperial palace. Both were destroyed. The emperor took refuge at Shimokam and afterwards went to Shōgon-in.
- November 4–7, 1854 (Kaei 7): Great Nankaidō earthquakes and tsunamis kill 80,000 people. An earthquake and tsunami struck Shimoda on the Izu Peninsula; and because the port had just been designated as the prospective location for a U.S. consulate, some construed the natural disasters as demonstration of the displeasure of the kami.
- 1854 (Kaei 7, 27th day of the 11th month): The era name was changed to Ansei (meaning "tranquil government"), which was meant to herald the beginning of a peaceful period. The impetus and explanation for this change of era names was said to have been the burning of the Palace in Kyoto in the preceding summer.

== Gallery ==
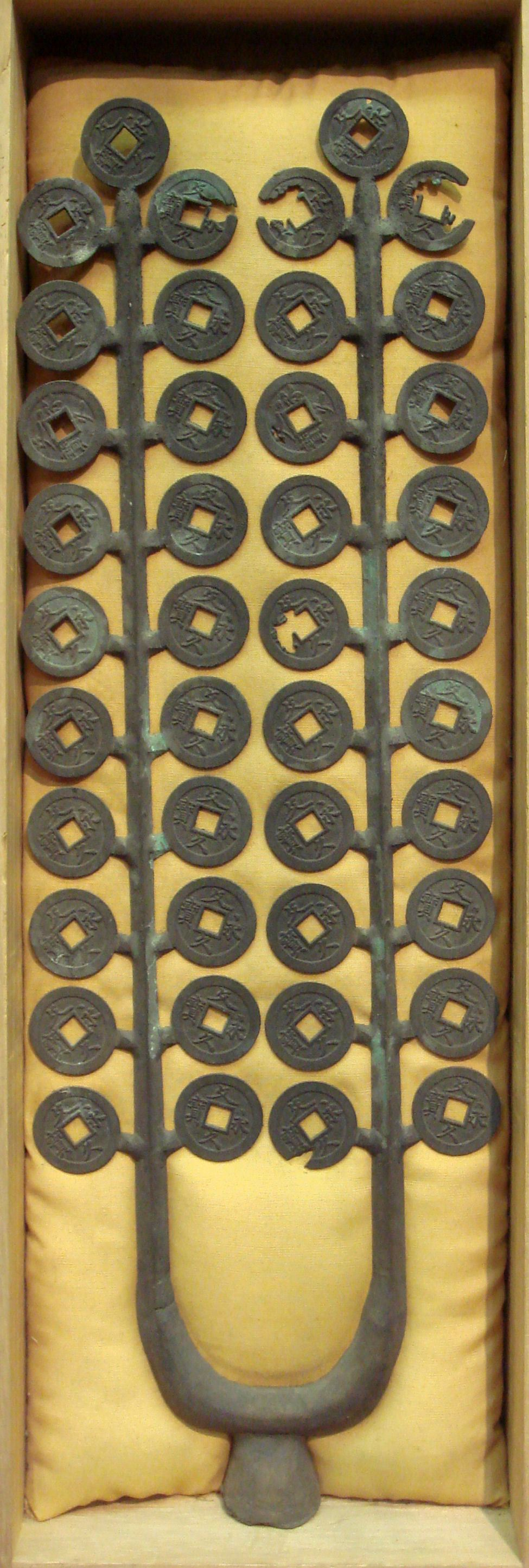
Branched ("Edasen" 枝錢) Mon coins of Tokugawa coinage, of the Kaei period.

== Notes ==
| Preceded by Kōka (弘化) | Era or nengō Kaei (嘉永); 28 February 1848 – 27 November 1854 | Succeeded by Ansei (安政) |
