= Hayashi Gakusai =

Hayashi Gakusei
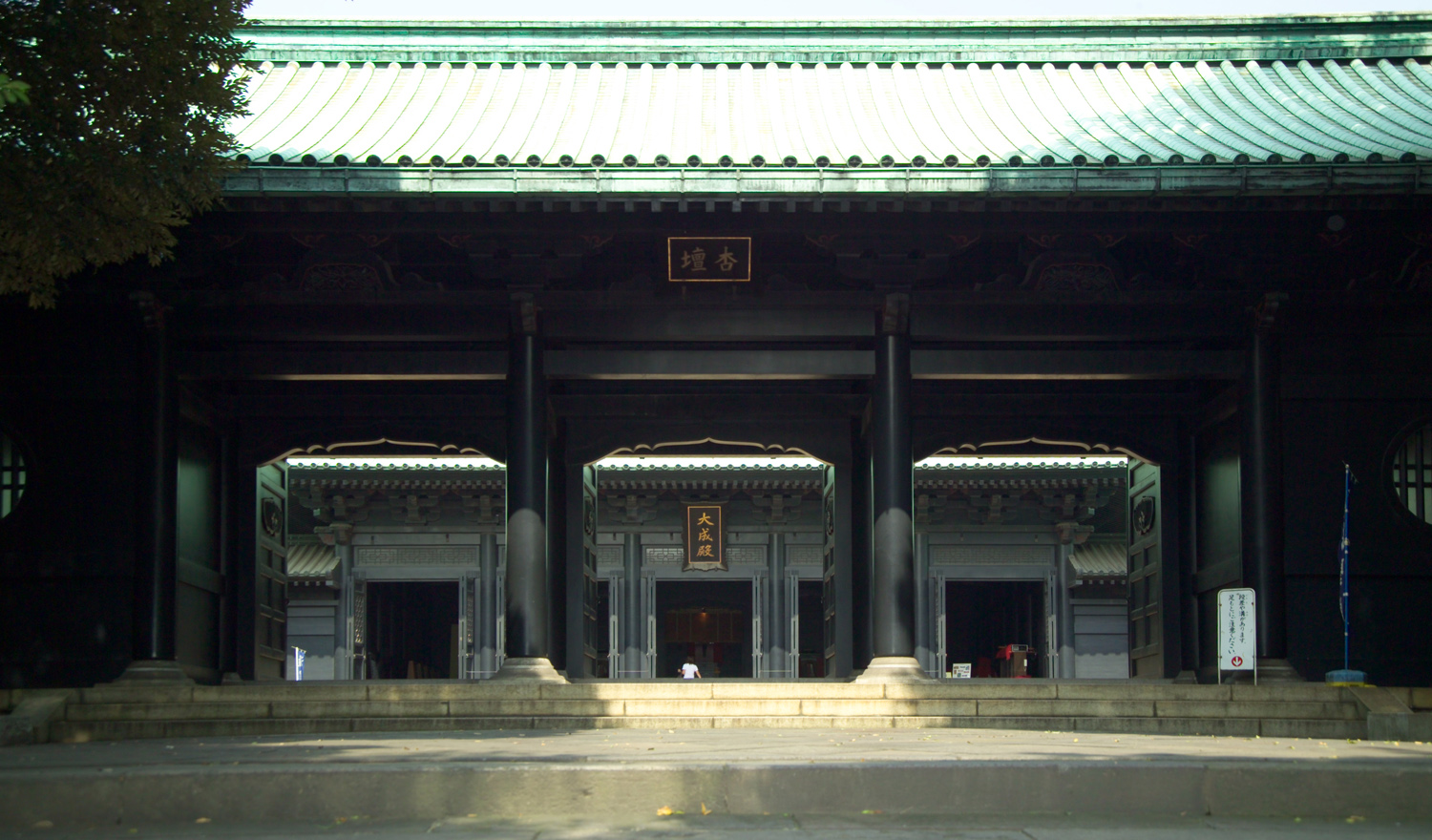
- Hayashi Gakusei, 10th rector of Yushima Seidō.
- Born: 1833; Edo
- Died: 1906 (aged 72–73); Edo
- Occupations: Neo-Confucian scholar, academic, administrator, writer, diplomat
- Writing career
- Subjects: Japanese history, literature

Hayashi Gakusai (林 学斎; November 12, 1833 – July 14, 1906), formerly Hayashi Noboru, was a neo-Confucian scholar and a bakufu official in the late Tokugawa shogunate.

== Academician ==
Hayashi Daigaku-no-kami Gakusai was a member of the Hayashi clan of Confucian scholars, each of whom were ad hoc personal advisers to the shōguns prominent figures in the educational training system for the bakufu bureaucrats. The progenitor of this lineage of scholars was Hayashi Razan, who lived to witness his philosophical and pragmatic reasoning become a foundation for the dominant ideology of the bakufu until the end of the 19th century.

This evolution developed in part from the official Hayashi schema equating samurai with the cultured governing class (although the samurai were largely illiterate at the beginning of the Tokugawa shogunate). The Hayashi helped to legitimize the role of the militaristic bakufu at the beginning of its existence. His philosophy is also important in that it encouraged the samurai class to cultivate themselves, a trend which would become increasingly widespread over the course of his lifetime and beyond. One of Hayashi Daigaku-no-kami Razan's aphorism encapsulates this view:

"No true learning without arms and no true arms without learning."

The Hayashi played a prominent role is helping to maintain the theoretical underpinnings of the Tokugawa regime; and Hayashi Daigaku-no-kami Gakusai was the 12th hereditary rector of Yushima Seidō.

The privileges and honors he and his family and his clan had enjoyed up through 1867 were stripped from them during the turmoil which accompanied the Meiji Restoration in 1868.

== Kanagawa convention of 1853 ==
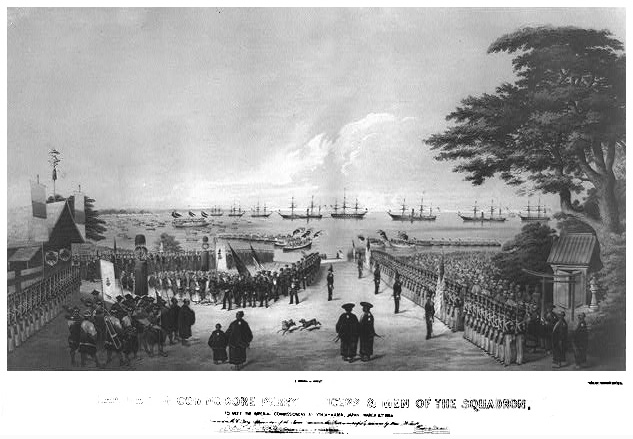
Landing of Commodore Perry, officers & men of the squadron, to meet the Imperial commissioners at Yoku-Hama (Yokohama?) July 14, 1853. Lithograph by Sarony & Co., 1855, after Wilhelm Heine.

- Kaei 7 (1853): Commodore Perry returned to Edo Bay to force Japanese agreement to the Treaty of Kanagawa; and the chief Japanese negotiator was Daigaku-no kami Hayashi Akira, who was known to the Americans as "Prince Commissioner Hayashi".

"Immediately, on signing and exchanging copies of the treaty, Commodore Perry presented the first commissioner, Prince Hayashi, with an American flag stating that this gift was the highest expression of national courtesy and friendship he could offer. The prince was deeply moved, and expressed his gratitude with evident feeling. The commodore next presented the other commissioners with gifts he had especially reserved for them. All business now having been concluded to the satisfaction of both delegations, the Japanese commissioners invited Perry and his officers to enjoy a feast and entertainment especially prepared for the celebration." – from American eyewitness account of the event

Hayashi Noboru's signature can be found on the Japanese translation of the Dutch text of the agreement negotiated between Commodore Perry and Daigaku-no-kami Hayashi, implying some degree of participation in this historic negotiation.

== See also ==
- Hayashi clan (Confucian scholars)

| Preceded by Hayashi Akira | Rector of the Shogunate College; 18__–18__ | Succeeded by none |
