= Hayashi Ryūkō =

Japanese Neo-Confucian scholar

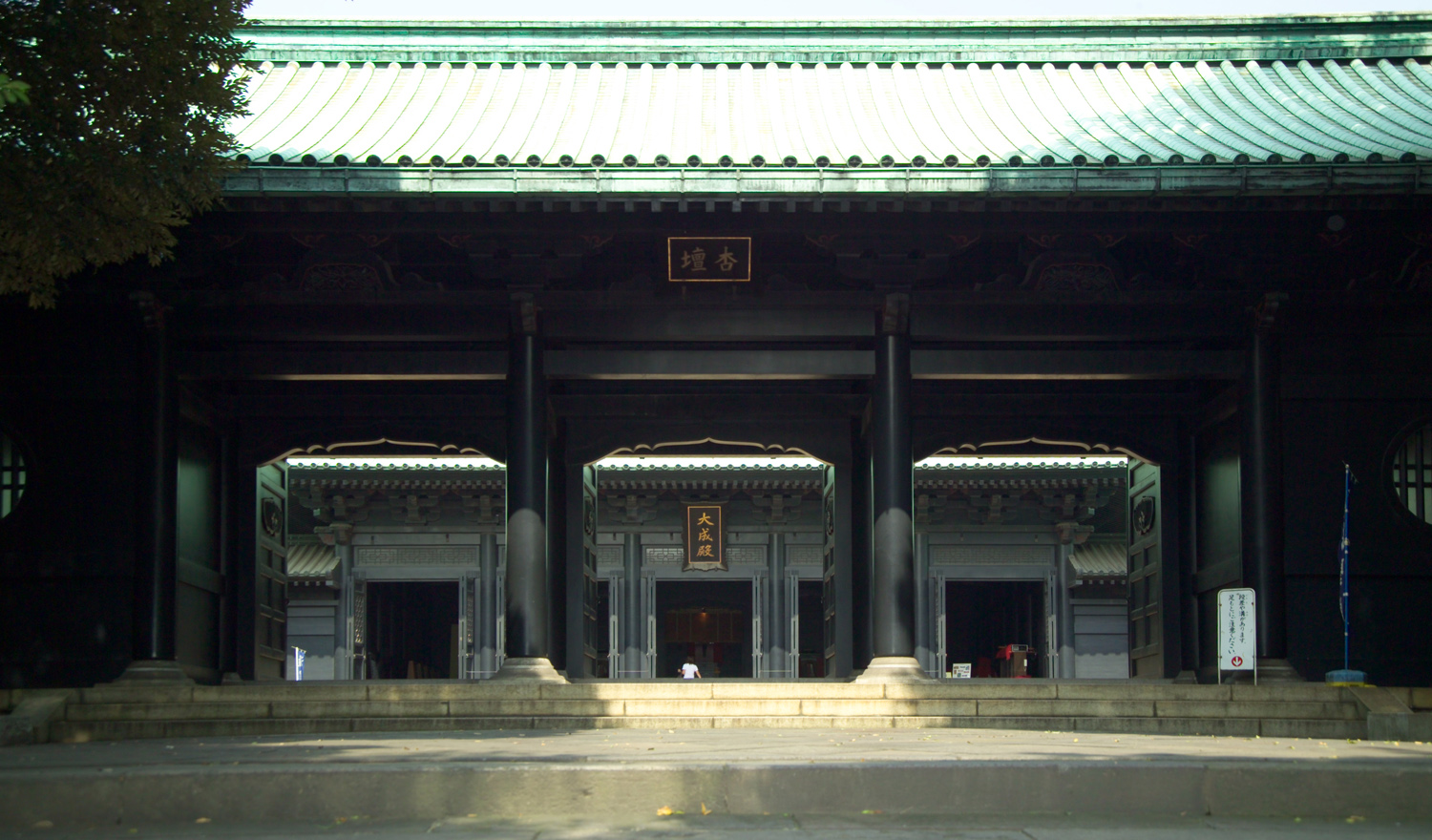
- Hayashi Ryūkō, 2nd rector of Yushima Seidō
- Born: 1681; Edo
- Died: December 11, 1758 (aged 76–77); Edo
- Occupations: Neo-Confucian scholar, academic, administrator, writer
- Children: Hayashi Hōkoku, son
- Relatives: Hayashi Hōkō, father Hayashi Gahō, grandfather Hayashi Razan, great-grandfather
- Writing career
- Subjects: Japanese history, literature

Hayashi Ryūkō (林 榴岡; 1681 – December 11, 1758) was a Japanese Neo-Confucian scholar, teacher and administrator in the system of higher education maintained by the Tokugawa bakufu during the Edo period. He was a member of the Hayashi clan of Confucian scholars.

== Academician ==
Hōkō was the fourth Hayashi clan Daigaku-no-kami of the Edo period.

Hōkō is known as the second official rector of the Shōhei-kō. This academy would come to be known as the Yushima Seidō) . This institution stood at the apex of the country-wide educational and training system which was created and maintained by the Tokugawa shogunate. Ryūkō's hereditary title was Daigaku-no-kami, which, in the context of the Tokugawa shogunate hierarchy, effectively translates as "head of the state university".

== See also ==
- Hayashi clan (Confucian scholars)

== Notes ==
Preceded by Hayashi Hōkō	2nd rector of Yushima Seidō	Succeeded by Hayashi Hōkoku
