= Hayashi Gahō =

Japanese philosopher (1618–1688)

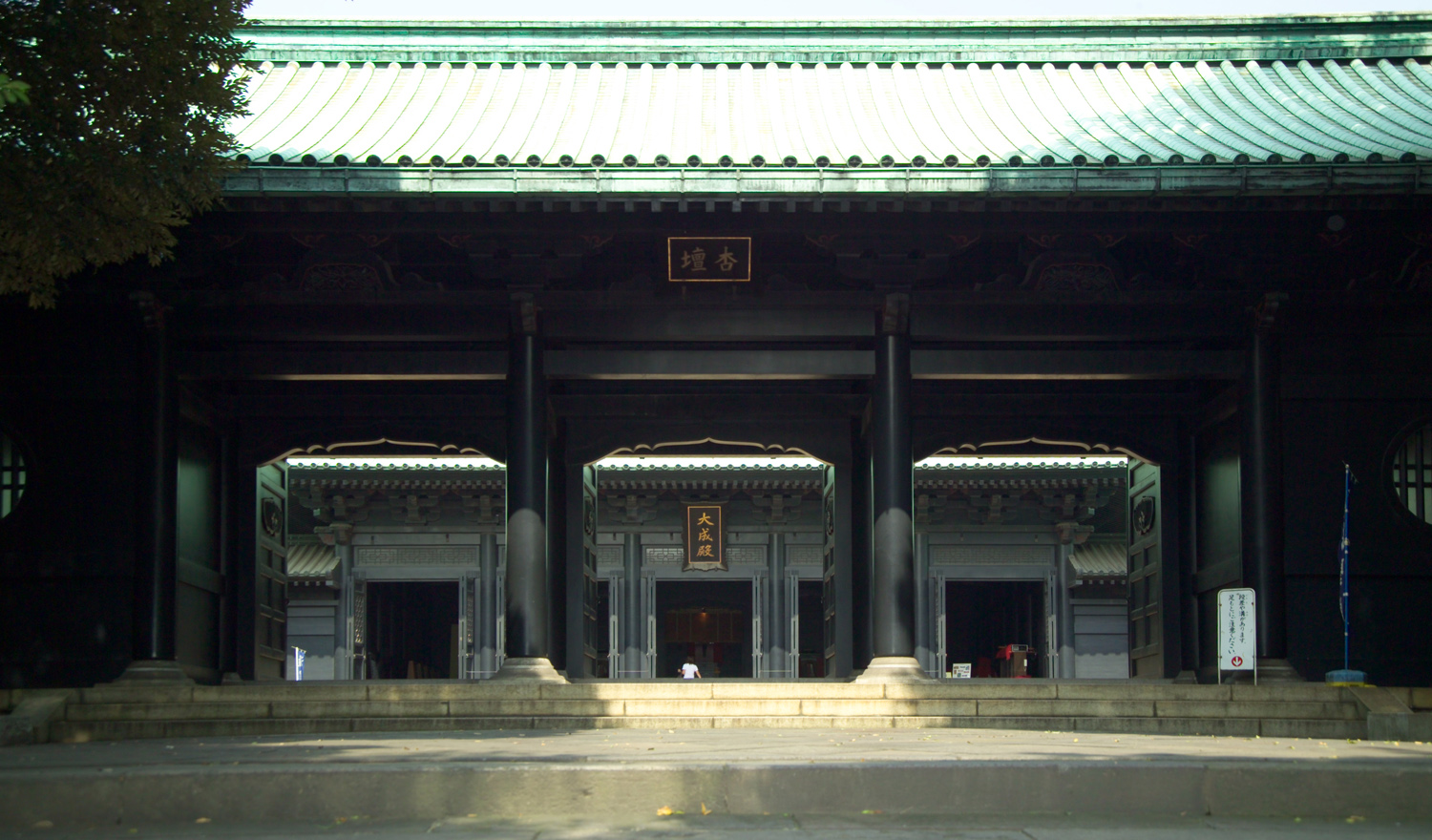
- Hayashi Gahō was head of the early seidō
- Born: 1618; Kyoto
- Died: 1680 (aged 61–62); Edo
- Occupations: Philosopher, writer
- Children: Hayashi Hōkō, son
- Relatives: Hayashi Razan, father
- Writing career
- Subjects: Japanese history, literature

Hayashi Gahō (林 鵞峰; July 21, 1618 – June 1, 1680), also known as Hayashi Shunsai (林 春斎), was a Japanese Neo-Confucian philosopher and writer in the system of higher education maintained by the Tokugawa bakufu during the Edo period. He was a member of the Hayashi clan of Confucian scholars.

Following in the footsteps of his father, Hayashi Razan, Gahō (formerly Harukatsu) would devote a lifetime to expressing and disseminating the official neo-Confucian doctrine of the Tokugawa shogunate. Like his distinguished father, Gahō's teaching and scholarly written work emphasized Neo-Confucianist virtues and order.

== Academician ==
Gahō became the unofficial rector of what would become Edo’s Confucian Academy, the Shōhei-kō (afterwards known as the Yushima Seidō). This institution stood at the apex of the country-wide educational and training system which was created and maintained by the Tokugawa shogunate. Gahō's hereditary title was Daigaku-no-kami, which, in the context of the Tokugawa shogunate hierarchy, effectively translates as "head of the state university".

In the elevated context his father engendered, Gahō worked on editing a chronicle of Japanese emperors compiled in conformance with his father's principles. Nihon Ōdai Ichiran grew into a seven-volume text which was completed in 1650. Gahō himself was accepted as a noteworthy scholar in that period; but the potent Shōhei-kō and Hayashi family links to the work’s circulation are part of the explanation for this work's 18th and 19th century popularity. Contemporary readers must have found some degree of usefulness in this summary drawn from historical records.

The narrative of Nihon Ōdai Ichiran stops around 1600, most likely in deference to the sensibilities of the Tokugawa regime. Gahō's text did not continue up through his present day; rather, he terminated the chronicles just before the last pre-Tokugawa ruler. Gahō modestly observed that "in a book intended for the shogun's eyes, it is incumbent upon one to be circumspect." This book was published in the mid-17th century and it was reissued in 1803, "perhaps because it was a necessary reference work for officials."

Gahō would become his father's successor as advisor to the shogun. He was the Tokugawa shogunate's chief scholar. After Razan's death, Gahō finished work his father had begun, including a number of other works designed to help readers learn from Japan's history. In 1665, Gahō published an anthology of historical poems (Honchō Ichinin Isshu). In 1670, the Hayashi family's scholarly reputation was burnished when Gahō published the 310 volumes of The Comprehensive History of Japan (本朝通鑑, Honchō-tsugan).

Together with his brother, Hayashi Dokkōsai (formerly Morikatsu), Gahō compiled, edited and posthumously published selections from their father's body of writings:

- Hayashi Razan bunshū (The Collected Works of Hayashi Razan), reissued in 1918
- Razan Sensei Isshū (Master Razan's Poems), reissued in 1921

Gahō's son, Hayashi Hōkō (formerly Nobuatsu), would eventually inherit the position as head of the Shōhei-kō or Yushima Seidō, as well as the honorific Daigaku-no kami; and his progeny would continue the Hayashi traditions.

In January 1858, it would be the hereditary Daigaku-no-kami descendant of Hayashi Razan and Hayashi Gahō who would head the bakufu delegation which sought advice from the emperor in deciding how to deal with newly assertive foreign powers. This would have been the first time the Emperor's counsel was actively sought since the establishment of the Tokugawa shogunate. The most easily identified consequence of this transitional overture would be the increased numbers of messengers which were constantly streaming back and forth between Tokyo and Kyoto during the next decade. There is no small irony in the fact that this 19th-century scholar/bureaucrat would find himself at a crucial nexus of managing political change—moving arguably "by the book" through uncharted waters with well-settled theories as the only guide.

== Selected works ==
- Kan'ei shoka keizu-den (with Hayashi Razan), a genealogy of warrior families.
- Honchō tsugan (with Haayshi Razan), a history of Japan.
- Kokushi jitsuroki.
- Nihon Ōdai ichiran.
- Kan'ei keizu (1643).

== See also ==
- Hayashi clan (Confucian scholars)

== Notes ==
Preceded by Hayashi Razan	Daigaku-no-kami (Head of the state educational system)	Succeeded by Hayashi Hōkō
