= Daigaku-no-kami =

Japanese Imperial Court position and title

Daigaku-no-kami (大学頭) was a Japanese Imperial court position and the title of the chief education expert in the rigid court hierarchy. The Imperial Daigaku-no-kami predates the Heian period; and the court position continued up through the early Meiji period. The title and position were conferred in the name of the Emperor of Japan.

In the Edo period, the head of the educational and bureaucrat training system for the Tokugawa shogunate was also known by the honorific title Daigaku-no-kami, which effectively translates as "Head of the State University". The title and position were conferred in the name of the shōgun.

== Imperial court hierarchy ==
The Imperial court position of Daigaku-no-kami identified the chief education expert in the Imperial retinue. The Daigaku-no-kami was head of the Imperial University, the Daigaku-ryō. The title arose during evolution of governmental reorganizations beginning in 701. These pre-Heian period innovations are collectively known as the ritsuryō-sei (律令制).

The position and the title ultimately came about under the direction of Prince Osakabe, Fujiwara no Fuhito and Awata no Mahito at the request of Emperor Monmu. Like many other developments at the time, the title was an adaptation derived from the governmental system of China's Tang dynasty.

The somewhat inflexible hierarchical nature of the court requires that the function of the Daigaku-no-kami be understood both in terms of specific functions and in terms of those ranking above and below in the Ministry of Civil Services.

In the Asuka period, the Nara period and the Heian period, the Imperial court hierarchy encompassed a Ministry of the Civil Services (式部省,, Shikibu-shō); also known as the "Ministry of Legislative Direction and Public Instruction". This ministry collected and maintained biographical archives of meritorious subjects. Within this ministry structure, the highest-ranking official was the Chief administrator of the ministry of civil services (式部卿,, Shikibu-kyō); also known as Chief minister of public instruction.

This office was typically filled by a son or close relative of the emperor. For example, in 773 (Hōki 4), the daigaku-no-kami was Yamabe-shinnō, who was named Crown Prince and heir of Emperor Kōnin. However, there were exceptions to this general rule if there was an especially pre-eminent contemporary scholar, such as in the case of Miyoshi Kiyotsura.

Accompanying the Daigaku-no-kami were seven judges, who directly assisted this minister.

Ranking just below these judges were educational authorities:

- Chief Education expert (大学頭,, Daigaku-no kami).
  - Chief experts on history (of Japan and China) (紀伝博士,, Kiden hakase).
  - Chief experts on classical (Chinese) works (明経博士,, Myōgyō hakase).
  - Chief experts on jurisprudence (of Japan and China) (明法博士,, Myōbō hakase).
  - Chief experts on mathematics (算博士,, San hakase).
  - Chief calligrapher of the court (文章博士,, Monjō hakase). There would have been many copyist calligraphers working under the direction of the chief calligrapher.
  - First Assistant to the chief calligrapher of the court (助教,, Jokyō).
  - Instructors of (Japanese and Chinese) literature (直講,, Chok'kō)—two positions.
  - Instructors in pronunciation of words (音博士,, On hakase)—two positions.
  - Instructors in calligraphy (書博士,, Sho hakase)—two positions.

== Tokugawa bakufu hierarchy ==
In the Edo period, this title identifies the head of the chief educational institution of the Tokugawa state. It was conferred by the shōgun in 1691 when the Neo-Confucian academy moved to land provided by the shogunate. In the years which followed, this academic title became hereditary for the ten descendants of Hayashi Hōkō who were sequential heads of the Yushima Seidō. The 10 rectors of the institution who were each identified by the title daigaku-no-kami were:

- 1st rector (and Daigaku-no-kami): Hayashi Hōkō (1644–1732), formerly Hayashi Nobuhatsu (son of Gahō).
- 2nd rector (and Daigaku-no-kami): Hayashi Ryūkō (1681–1758).
- 3rd rector (and Daigaku-no-kami): Hayashi Hōkoku (1721–1773).
- 4th rector (and Daigaku-no-kami): Hayashi Hōtan (1761–1787).
- 5th rector (and Daigaku-no-kami): Hayashi Kimpō (1767–1793), also known as Hayashi Kanjun or Hayashi Nobutaka
- 6th rector and 8th Daigaku-no-kami): Hayashi Jussai (1768–1841), formerly Matsudaira Norihira, 3rd son of Iwamura daimyō Matsudaira Norimori—Norihira was adopted into Hayashi family when Kinpō/Kanjun died childless; explained shogunate foreign policy to Emperor Kōkaku in 1804., also known as Hayashi Jitsusai and Hayashi Kō.
- 7th rector (and Daigaku-no-kami): Hayashi Teiu (1791–1844).
- 8th rector (and Daigaku-no-kami): Hayashi Sōkan (1828–1853).
- 9th rector (and Daigaku-no-kami): Hayashi Fukusai (1800–1859), also known as Hayashi Akira, chief Japanese negotiator for the Treaty of Kanagawa
- 10th rector (and Daigaku-no-kami): Hayashi Gakusai (1833–1906), formerly Hayashi Noboru, head of the academy in 1867.

The rector of the Yushima Seidō stood at the apex of the country-wide educational and training system which was created and maintained with the personal involvement of successive shōguns. The position as rector of the Yushima Seidō became hereditary in the Hayashi family. The rectors' scholarly reputation was burnished by publication in 1657 of the 7 volumes of Survey of the Sovereigns of Japan (日本王代一覧, Nihon Ōdai Ichiran) and by the publication in 1670 of the 310 volumes of The Comprehensive History of Japan (本朝通鑑, Honchō-tsugan).

== Meiji constitutional hierarchy ==
In the course of the Meiji Restoration, this Imperial title was abolished; but its position within the ambit of a reorganized government structure would be developed further in the Meiji period Daijō-kan.

== See also ==
- Taihō Code
- Yōrō Code
- Daijō-kan
- Sugawara no Kiyotomo
- Sugawara no Michizane
- Hayashi clan
