= Hayashi Hōkō =

Japanese philosopher (1644–1732)

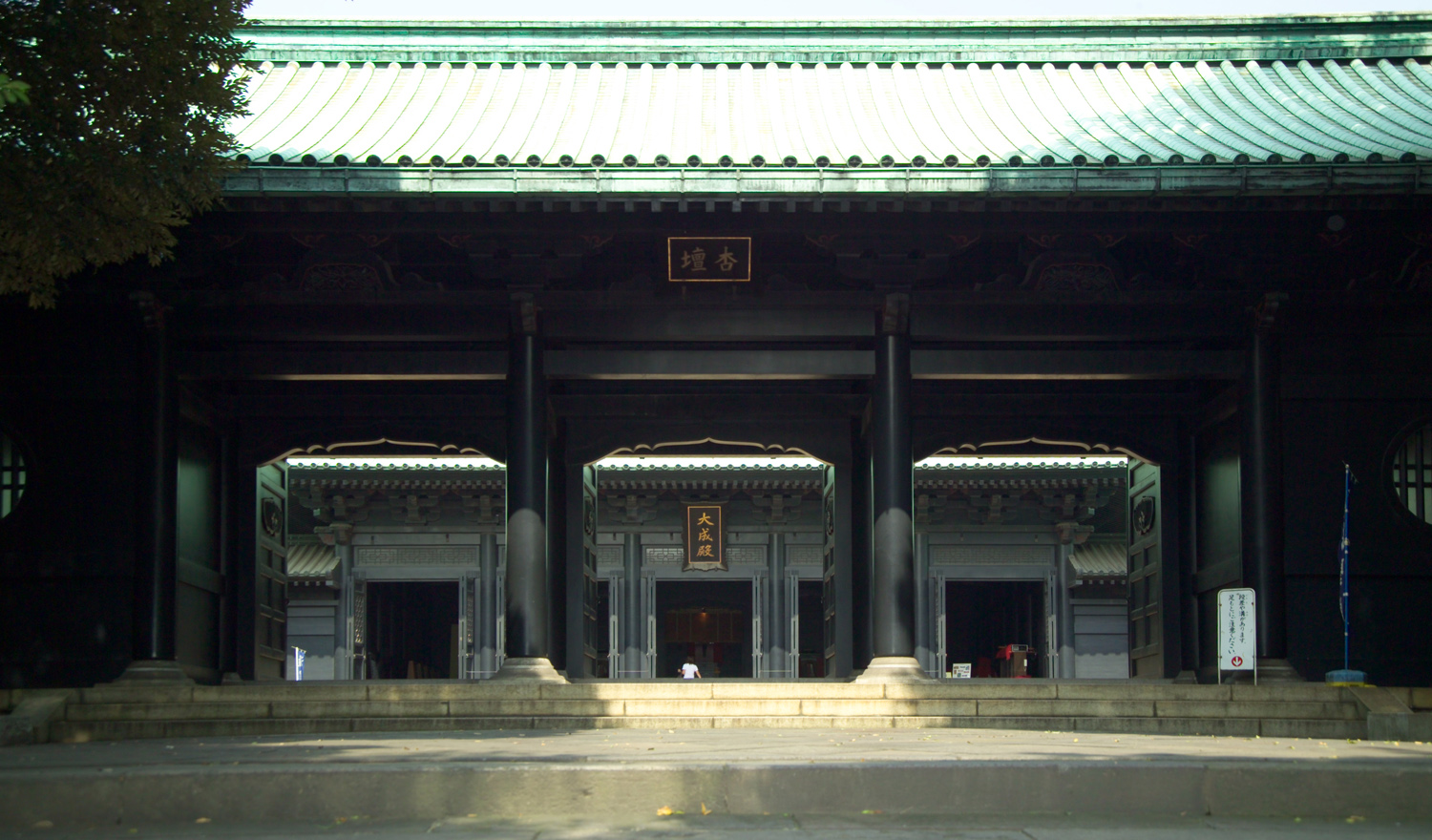
- Hayashi Hōkō, 1st rector of Yushima Seidō
- Born: 1644; Edo
- Died: 1732 (aged 87–88); Edo
- Occupations: Neo-Confucian scholar, academic, administrator, writer
- Children: Hayashi Ryūkō, son
- Relatives: Hayashi Gahō, father Hayashi Razan, grandfather
- Writing career
- Subjects: Japanese history, literature

Hayashi Hōkō (林 鳳岡; January 11, 1644 – July 22, 1732), also known as Hayashi Nobutatsu, was a Japanese Neo-Confucian scholar, teacher and administrator in the system of higher education maintained by the Tokugawa bakufu during the Edo period. He was a member of the Hayashi clan of Confucian scholars.

Hōkō was the tutor of Tokugawa Tsuneyoshi.

Following in the footsteps of his father, Hayashi Gahō, and his grandfather, Hayashi Razan, Hōkō would be the arbiter of official neo-Confucian doctrine of the Tokugawa shogunate. As a result of his urging, the shōgun invested Confucian scholars as samurai.

== Academician ==
Hōkō was the third Hayashi clan Daigaku-no-kami of the Edo period. After 1691, Hōkō is known as the first official rector of the Shōhei-kō (afterwards known as the Yushima Seidō) which was built on land provided by the shōgun. This institution stood at the apex of the country-wide educational and training system which was created and maintained by the Tokugawa shogunate. Gahō's hereditary title was Daigaku-no-kami, which, in the context of the Tokugawa shogunate hierarchy, effectively translates as "head of the state university".

The scholars of the Hayashi school were taught to apply what they had learned from a Confucian curriculum. Typically, they applied the Confucian texts conservatively, relying on Soong Confucian analysis and metaphysical teachings.

The neo-Confucianist scholar Arai Hakuseki generally expressed scant regard for opinions expressed by Hayashi Hōkō.

== Selected works ==
- Kai hentai (Chinese Metamorphosis), reports of Chinese junks arriving in Nagasaki, 1640–1740.

== See also ==
- Hayashi clan (Confucian scholars)

== Notes ==
Preceded by Hayashi Gahō	1st rector of Yushima Seidō; 1691–1732	Succeeded by Hayashi Ryūkō
