= Hayashi Jussai =

Japanese scholar

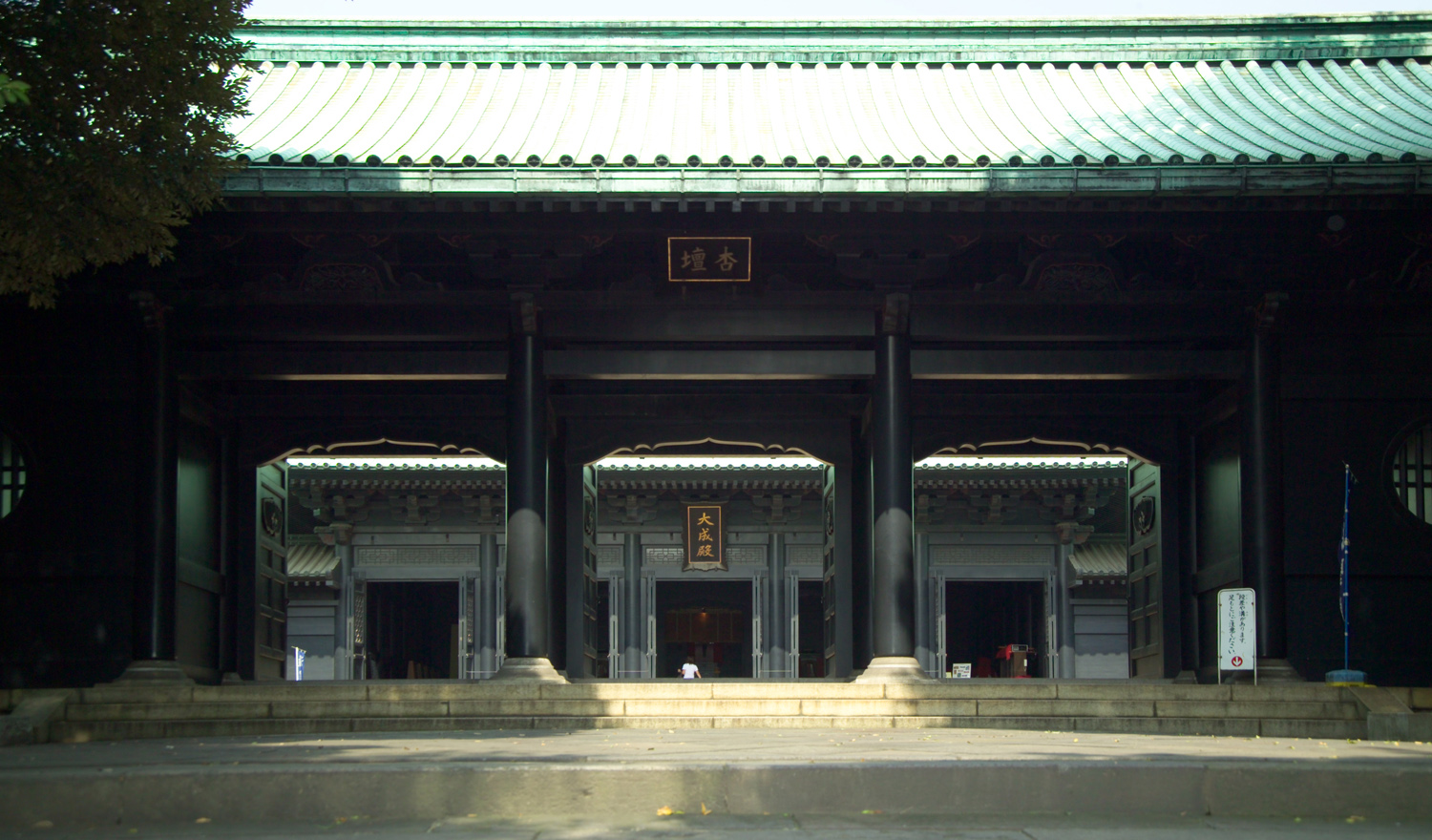
- Hayashi Jussai, 6th rector of Yushima Seidō.
- Born: August 10, 1768
- Died: August 30, 1841 (aged 73); Edo
- Occupations: Neo-Confucian scholar, academic, administrator, writer, diplomat
- Writing career
- Subjects: Japanese history, literature

Hayashi Jussai (林 述斎; August 10, 1768 – August 30, 1841) was a Japanese neo-Confucian scholar of the Edo period. He was an hereditary rector of Edo’s Confucian Academy, the Shōhei-kō, also known at the Yushima Seidō, which was built on land provided by the shōgun. The Yushima-Seidō, which stood at the apex of the Tokugawa shogunate's educational system; and Jussai was styled with the hereditary title "Head of the State University" (大学頭, Daigaku-no-kami).

== Academician ==
Hayashi Daigaku-no-kami Jussai was a member of the Hayashi clan of Confucian scholars, each of whom were ad hoc personal advisers to the shoguns prominent figures in the educational training system for the bakufu bureaucrats. The progenitor of this lineage of scholars was Hayashi Razan, who lived to witness his philosophical and pragmatic reasoning become a foundation for the dominant ideology of the bakufu until the end of the 19th century.

This evolution developed in part from the official Hayashi schema equating samurai with the cultured governing class (although the samurai were largely illiterate at the beginning of the Tokugawa shogunate. The Hayashi helped to legitimize the role of the militaristic bakufu at the beginning of its existence. His philosophy is also important in that it encouraged the samurai class to cultivate themselves, a trend which would become increasingly widespread over the course of his lifetime and beyond. One of Hayashi Daigaku-no-kami Razan's aphorism encapsulates this view:

"No true learning without arms and no true arms without learning."

The Hayashi played a prominent role in helping to maintain the theoretical underpinnings of the Tokugawa regime; and Hayashi Daigaku-no-kami Jussai was the 8th hereditary rector of Yushima Seidō.

Jussai was the son of Matsudaira Norimori of the Iwamura Domain. He was appointed by Matsudaira Sadanobu to be heir to the previous Hayashi family head, Kimpō.

== Notes ==
Preceded by Hayashi Kimpō	Rector of the Shogunate College; 1793-1838	Succeeded by Hayashi Teiu
