= Daigaku-ryō =

Former imperial university of Japan

Daigaku-ryō (大学寮) was the former Imperial university of Japan, founded at the end of the 7th century. The Daigaku-ryō predates the Heian period, continuing in various forms through the early Meiji period. The director of the Daigaku-ryō was called the Daigaku-no-kami.

The Daigaku-ryō was located near the Suzakumon at southern border of Kyoto's grid. In the 12th century, the original structure was destroyed by fire, and it was not rebuilt.

== Ritsuryō organization ==
The Daigaku-ryō was reorganized in 701. It became part of the Ministry of the Civil Services (式部省, Shikibu-shō), also known as the "Ministry of Legislative Direction and Public Instruction". Among other duties, this ministry collected and maintained biographical archives of meritorious subjects, and those who would carry out the functions of the ministry were trained at the Daigaku-ryō.

The Director or head of the academy (大学頭, Daigaku-no-kami) was responsible for the examination of students and the celebration of festivals associated with Confucius and his disciples.

Educational authorities associated with the Daigaku-ryō included:

- Chief experts on the history of Japan and China (紀伝博士,, Kiden hakase).
- Chief experts on classical Chinese works (明経博士,, Myōgyō hakase).
- Chief experts on jurisprudence of Japan and China (明法博士,, Myōbō hakase).
- Chief experts on mathematics (算博士,, San hakase).
- Instructors of Japanese and Chinese literature (直講,, Chok'kō) -- two positions.
- Instructors in pronunciation of words (音博士,, On hakase) -- two positions.
- Instructors in calligraphy (書博士,, Sho hakase) -- two positions.

== History ==
Prince Yamabe (who later became Emperor Kanmu) was Daigaku-no-kami in 766 (Tenpyō-jingo 2).

The institution had become a hollow shell by the Engi era (901-923), but its fortunes revived somewhat under the patronage of Emperor Daigo.

- May 27, 1177 (Angen 3, 28th day, 4th month): A fire burned the university structure to ashes.

== See also ==
- Taixue, the highest rank of educational establishment in Ancient China between the Han Dynasty and Sui Dynasty
- Yushima Seidō
