= Lin Wei =

Lin Wei (林暐, simplified Chinese/pinyin) may refer to:

- Dan Lin (林暐) (born 1973), Taiwanese-American film and television producer
- Hayashi Akira (林暐) (1800-1859), Japanese Edo period scholar-diplomat
