= Hayashi clan (Confucian scholars) =

Japanese samurai clan

Hayashi 林
- Titles: Daigaku-no-kami
- Founder: Hayashi Razan
- Final ruler: Hayashi Gakusai
- Founding year: 16th century

The Hayashi clan (林氏, Hayashi-shi) was a Japanese samurai clan which served as important advisors to the Tokugawa shōguns. Among members of the clan in powerful positions in the shogunate was its founder Hayashi Razan, who passed on his post as hereditary rector of the neo-Confucianist Shōhei-kō school to his son, Hayashi Gahō, who also passed it on to his son, Hayashi Hōkō; this line of descent continued until the end of Hayashi Gakusai's tenure in 1867. However, elements of the school carried on until 1888, when it was folded into the newly organized Tokyo University.

== Hayashi clan position ==
The Hayashi family's special position as personal advisors to the shōgun gave their school an imprimatur of legitimacy that no other contemporary Confucian academy possessed. This meant that Hayashi views or interpretation were construed as dogma. Anyone challenging the Hayashi status quo was perceived as trying to challenge Tokugawa hegemony; and any disagreements with the Hayashi were construed as threatening the larger structure of complex power relations within which the Confucian field was embedded. Any disputes in the Confucian field in the 1650s and 1660s may have originated in personal rivalries or authentic philosophical disagreements, but any issues became inextricably intertwined with the dominating political presence of the shōgun and those who ruled in his name.

In this period, the Tokugawa and the fudai daimyō were only the most powerful of the nearly 250 domain-holding lords in the country. By filling the high offices of the shogunate with his trusted, loyal daimyō, the shōgun paradoxically increased the power of these office holders and diminished the powers which were once held by Ieyasu alone, which caused each to more zealously guard against anything which might be seen to minimize intertwined power and prestige; and the varying characters of the shōgun further exacerbated this development. The Edo period power structure itself discouraged of dissent from what became the accepted Hayashi orthodoxy.

In the spectrum of the Tokugawa retainer band, the Hayashi family head himself was a high-ranking hatamoto (thus coming under the jurisdiction of the wakadoshiyori), and possessed an income of 3,500 koku.

== Notable clan members ==
=== Heads of clan ===
- Founder: Hayashi Razan (1583–1657), formerly Hayashi Nobukatsu, also known as Dōshun (1st son of Nobutoki).
- Son of founder: Hayashi Gahō (1618–1688), formerly Hayashi Harukatsu (3rd son of Razan).

The courtesy title of Daigaku no kami (大学頭, litt. Head of the school) identified the head of the chief educational institution of the state. It was conferred by the shogun in 1691 to Hayashi Hōkō when the Neo-Confucian academy moved to land provided by the shogunate at Yushima. This academic title became hereditary for the ten descendants who followed in succession.

- 1st Daigaku no Kami: Hayashi Hōkō (1644–1732), formerly Hayashi Nobuhatsu (son of Gahō).
- 2nd Daigaku no Kami: Hayashi Ryūkō (1681–1758).
- 3rd Daigaku no Kami: Hayashi Hōkoku (1721–1773).
- 4th Daigaku no Kami: Hayashi Hōtan (1761–1787).
- 5th Daigaku no Kami: Hayashi Kimpō (1767–1793), also known as Hayashi Kanjun or Hayashi Nobutaka
- 6th Daigaku no Kami: Hayashi Jussai (1768–1841), formerly Matsudaira Norihira, 3rd son of Iwamura daimyo Matsudaira Norimori—Norihira was adopted into Hayashi family when Kimpō/Kanjun died childless; explained shogunate foreign policy to Emperor Kōkaku in 1804., also known as Hayashi Jitsusai and Hayashi Kō.
- 7th Daigaku no Kami: Hayashi Teiu (1791–1844).
- 8th Daigaku no Kami: Hayashi Sōkan (1828–1853).
- 9th Daigaku no Kami: Hayashi Fukusai (1800–1859), also known as Hayashi Akira, chief Japanese negotiator for the Treaty of Kanagawa
- 10th Daigaku no Kami: Hayashi Gakusai (1833–1906), formerly Hayashi Noboru, head of Yushima Seidō in 1867.

=== Other notable clan members ===
- Hayashi Nobutoki (1583–1657), father of Hayashi Razan.
- Hayashi Nobozumi (1585–1683), brother of Hayashi Razan.
- Hayashi Yoshikatsu, brother of Hayashi Nobutoki and adoptive father of Hayashi Razan.
- Hayashi Dokkōsai, formerly Hayashi Morikatsu (born 1624), 4th son of Hayashi Razan
- Hayashi Shunzai or Hayashi Shunsai (1618–1680), alternate spellings for early name of Hayashi Gahō.
- Hayashi Jo, son of Hayashi Razan, brother of Gahō and Morikatsu.
- Hayashi Shuntoku (1624–1661).
- Hayashi Baisai.
- Hayashi Kansai.
- Torii Yōzō, 2nd son of Jussai—adopted into Torii family
- Satō Issai (1772–1859), adopted into Hayashi family from Iwamura, becomes professorial head of academy in 1805.
- Hayashi Kakuryō (1806–1878), Confucian scholar who never gave up his top-knot.
- Hayashi Ryōsai (1807–1849).

== Hayashi clan cemetery ==
The Hayashi clan cemetery is located in Ichigayayamabushi-cho, Shinjuku, Tokyo. The cemetery was originally located in Shinobu-ga-oka in Ueno, but in 1698 the Shogunate granted the clan an estate in Ushigome and the cemetery was relocated at that time. It houses the graves of the first 12 generations of the main lineage of the clan, starting with Hayashi Razan and including the tomb of Hayashi Akira, as well as the tombs of eight generations of a cadet lineage started by Hayashi Harutoku. The cemetery was designated a National Historic Site in 1926. It remained in the hands of the Hayashi clan until it was purchased by Shinjuku Ward in 1975. A total of 81 tombstones stand in the small site of about 360 square meters. It is open to the public every year in early November. The Hayashi clan cemetery is about a 5-minute walk from Ushigome-yanagichō Station on the Toei Metro Ōedo Line.

== See also ==
- Hayashi clan (disambiguation)
