= Yushima Seidō Exposition =

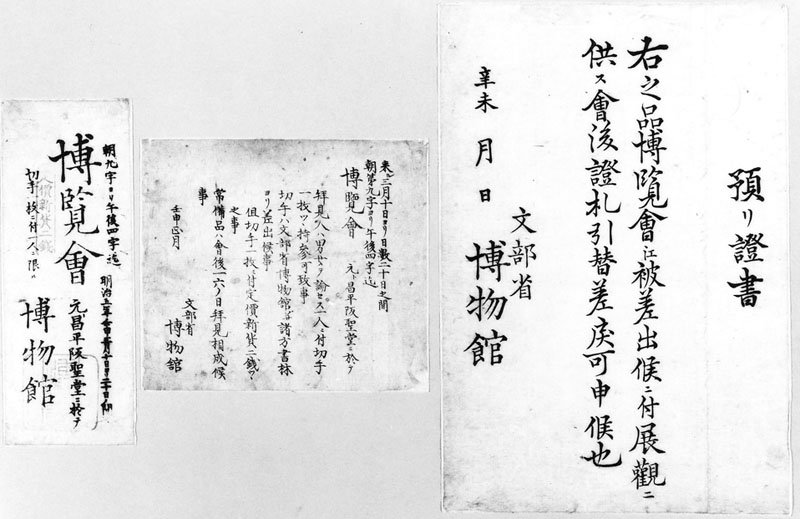
- Ticket, advert and deposit certificate

Overview
- BIE-class: Unrecognized exposition
- Name: Yushima Seidō Exposition
- Building(s): Taiseiden Hall
- Visitors: 192 878
- Organized by: Ministry of Education's Museum Bureau

Location
- Country: Japan
- City: Tokyo
- Coordinates: 35°42′03″N 139°45′59″E

Timeline
- Opening: 10 March 1872
- Closure: 30 April 1872

The Yushima Seidō Exposition was held at Taiseiden Hall, previously a Shinto shrine. It opened on 10 March 1872, closed 20 days later and displayed more than 600 items.

== Context ==
The exhibition took place a year before Vienna's world's fair, and was used as an opportunity to collate items for both events.

== Contents ==
There were over 600 exhibits: cultural artefacts and natural exhibits. One of the sashi from Nagoya Castle was shown, and was very popular.

== Visitors ==
The Emperor visited on 13 March and the Empress on 30 March. 192 878 people visited in total.

== Legacy ==
After the event much of the collection was opened as a permanent museum, which lead to the establishment of the Tokyo National Museum.

== Gallery ==
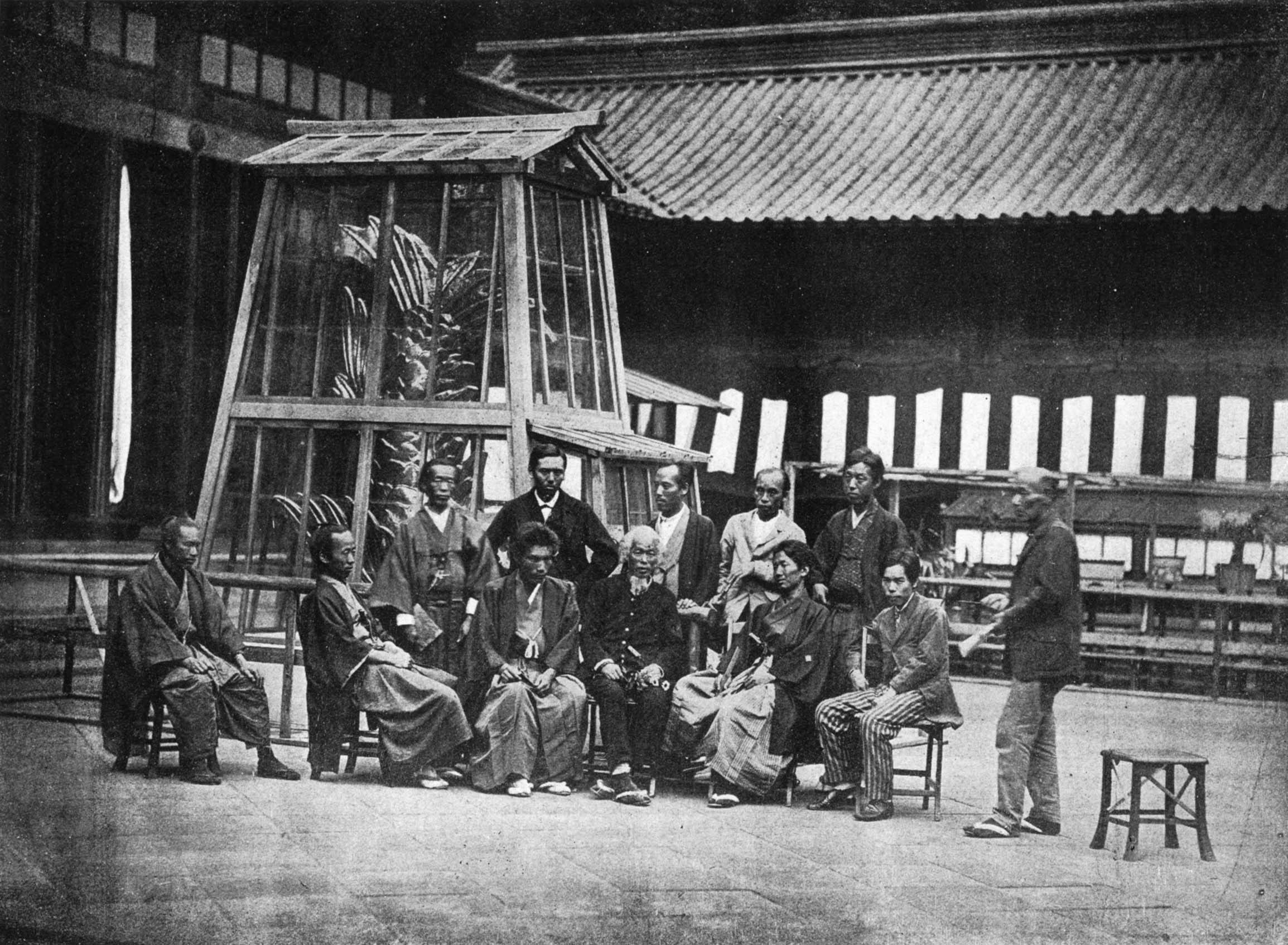
Staff of the Yushima Seido Exposition

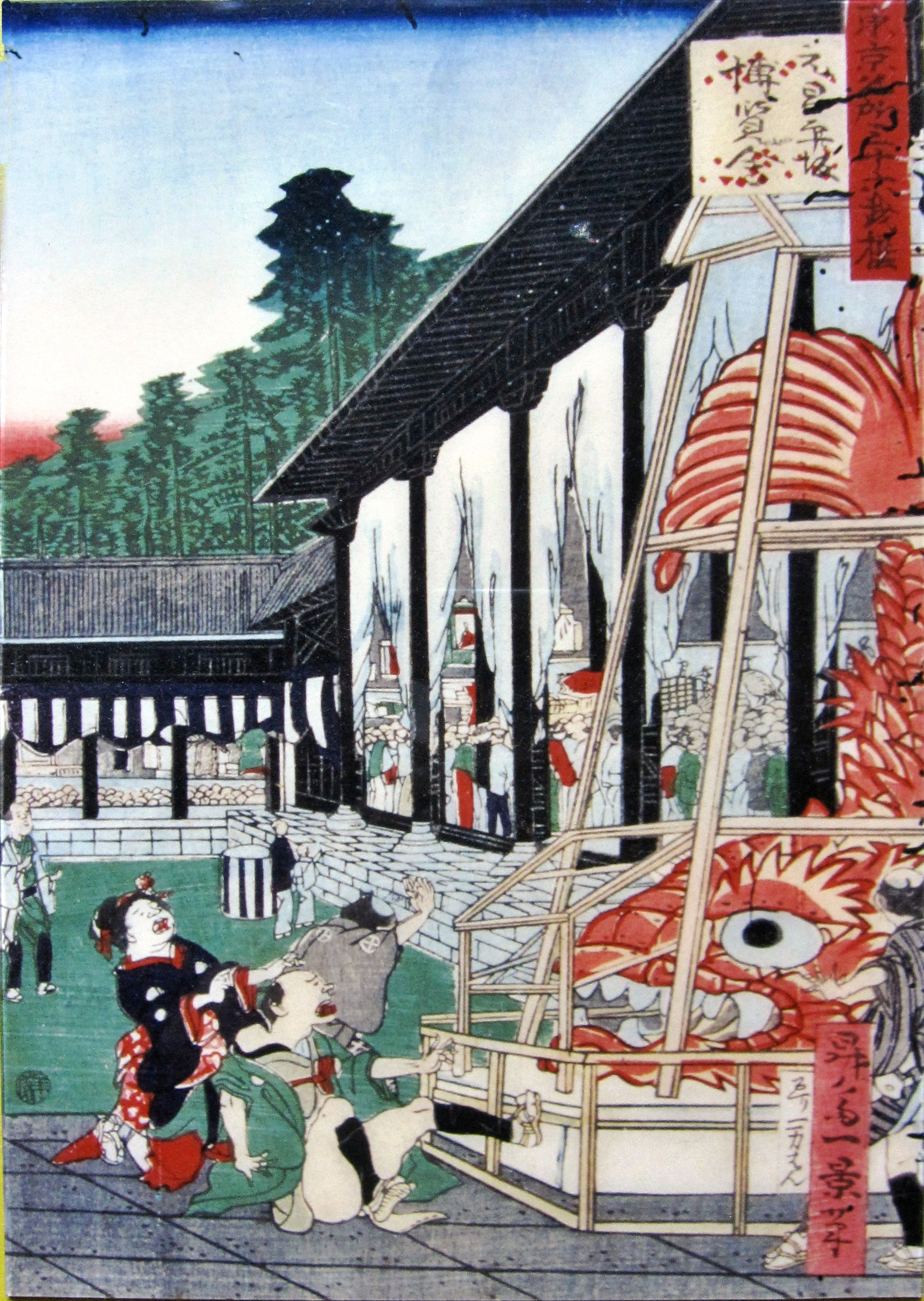
Sashi from Nagoya castle

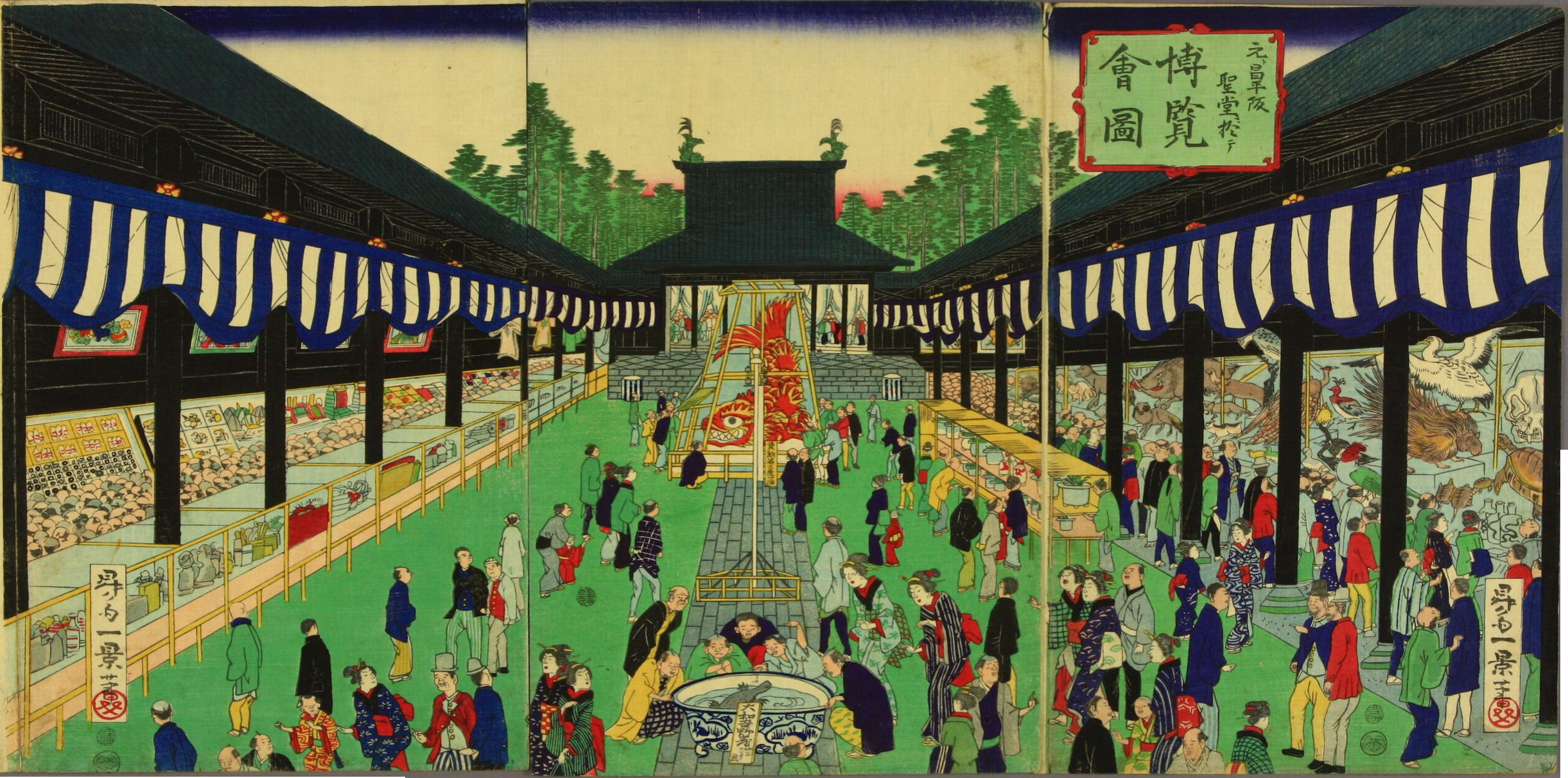
Yushima Seido Exhibition by Ikkei Shosai
