= Kōka =

Period of Japanese history (1844–1848)

Kōka (弘化) was a Japanese era name (年号, nengō; literally "year name") after Tenpō and before Kaei. This period spanned the years from December 1844 through February 1848. The reigning emperors were Ninkō-tennō (仁孝天皇) and Kōmei-tennō (孝明天皇).

== Change of era ==
- December 2, 1844 (Kōka gannen (弘化元年)): The new era name of Kōka, meaning "Becoming Wide or Vast", was created to mark a fire at Edo Castle in Tenpō 15.

The nengo was not changed concurrent with the accession of Emperor Komei; instead, the Kōka era was retained until about a year after the new emperor was enthroned.

== Events of the Kōka era ==
- 1847 (Kōka 4): A major earthquake was recorded.
- 1848 (Kōka 5): The last subscription noh of the premodern era.

During these years, Hiroshige began making a series of prints showing beautiful women in contexts of famous places.

== Notes ==
| Preceded by Tenpō (天保) | Era or nengō Kōka (弘化); 1844–1848 | Succeeded by Kaei (嘉永) |
