= Iwamura Domain =

Iwamura Domain 岩村藩
- under Tokugawa shogunate Japan
- 1601–1871
- Capital: Iwamura Castle
- Area
  - Coordinates: 35°21′36″N 137°27′04″E
  - Type: Daimyō
- Historical era: Edo period
  - Established: 1601
  - Disestablished: 1871
- Today part of: part of Gifu Prefecture

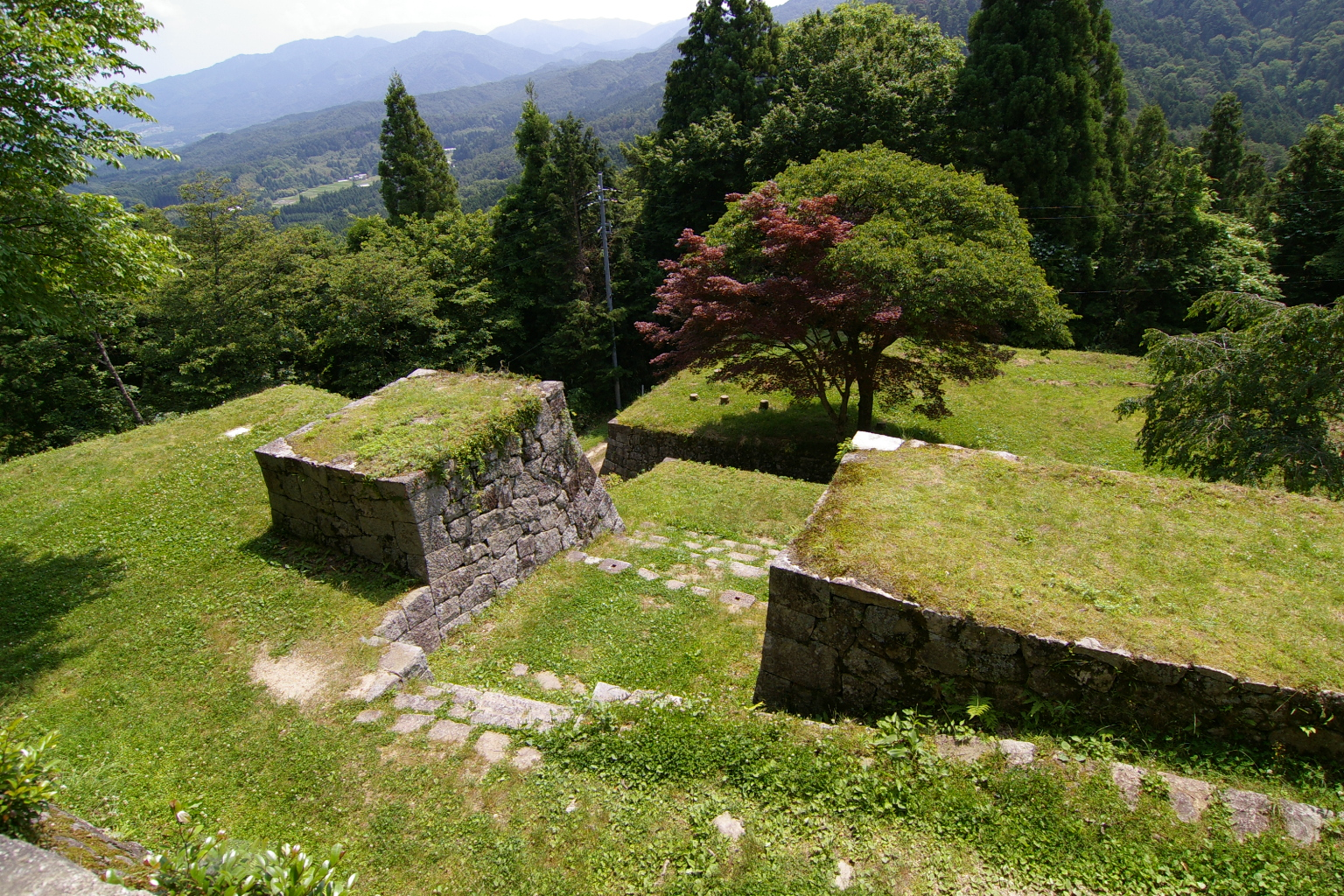
Ruins of Iwamura Castle

Iwamura Domain (岩村藩, Iwamura-han) was a feudal domain under the Tokugawa shogunate of Edo period Japan, located in Mino Province in what is now the town of Iwamura, Gifu. It was centered around Iwamura Castle, and controlled parts of Mino and Suruga Provinces. Iwamura Domain was controlled by a number of fudai daimyō clans in the course of its history.

== History ==
Following the Battle of Sekigahara, Tokugawa Ieyasu transferred Matsudaira Ienari of the Ogyū-Matsudaira clan from Niwa Domain in Kōzuke Province to the newly created Iwamura Domain. His son, Matsudaira Norinaga, distinguished himself during the Siege of Osaka and was rewarded with a promotion to Hamamatsu Domain in 1638. He was replaced by Niwa Ujinobu, formerly of Ibo Domain in Mikawa Province. He was from the Isshiki-Niwa clan, and was thus no relation to the more famous Niwa Nagahide, although both served Oda Nobunaga, and later Tokugawa Ieyasu. The Niwa clan ruled for five generations until 1705. The 5th daimyō, Niwa Ujioto, attempted to revive the domain's financial situation by hiring an outside consultant, Yamamura Seibei. Although the reforms were largely successful, this created an outpouring of resentment and violence from his retainers, to the point where the shogunate was forced to intervene to restore order. Five senior retainers were decapitated for sedition, his wife and 25 others were exiled to remote islands, and Niwa himself was demoted to 10,000 koku and reassigned to Takayanagi Domain in Echigo.

Matsudaira Noritada, a grandson of Matsudaira Norinaga, became daimyō in 1702, and his cadet branch of the Ogyū-Matsudaira clan ruled to domain to the Meiji restoration. The domain supplied a number of important officials in the shogunal administration, and was awarded with an increase in kokudaka to 30,000 koku in 1735. While the clan was assigned the office of Osaka-jō dai, they had an additional 10,000 koku from shogunal estates in Settsu, Izumi and Mimasaki Provinces. The Ogyū-Matsudaira were also noted for their scholarship. Matsudaira Noritada founded the han school, "Bunbusho", and his third son, Matsudaira Norimoto was adopted by the Hayashi clan of Confucian scholars, becoming Hayashi Jussai, head of the Yushima Seidō academy.

In the Bakumatsu period, the samurai of the domain were strongly divided between pro-shogunate and a pro-imperial factions. At the time Shogun Tokugawa Yoshinobu formerly returned power to the throne, the final daimyō Matsudaira Noritoshi was residing at the clan's Edo residence. With the start of the Boshin War, many of the pro-Tokugawa samurai departed to Edo intending to rally around the former shogun. This left the pro-imperial faction in the majority within Iwamura, and when the imperial armies advanced along the Nakasendō to demand the fealty of the various domains, a council of senior retainers capitulated Iwamura without Matsudaira Noritoshi's participation. The domain was asked to send troops along with Naegi Domain and Owari Domain to maintain security in Shinano Province and later Kai Province. Presented with this fait accompli, Matsudaira Noritoshi arrived in Kyoto on August 20, 1868, and pledged alliance to Emperor Meiji. Iwamura was asked to provide guards for the Kurama entrance to Edo, and Noritoshi was later appointed Imperial governor of Iwamura until the abolition of the han system in 1871.

== Holdings at the end of the Edo period ==
As with most domains in the han system, Iwamura Domain consisted of several discontinuous territories calculated to provide the assigned kokudaka, based on periodic cadastral surveys and projected agricultural yields. The domain7s holdings in Suruga were managed from Yokouchi jin'ya in what is now Fujieda, Shizuoka.

- Mino Province
  - 5 villages in Mugi District
  - 1 village in Anpachi District
  - 7 villages in Yamagata District
  - 1 village in Ōno District
- Suruga Province
  - 5 villages in Udo District
  - 8 villages in Shida District
  - 2 villages in Mashizu District

== List of daimyō ==
#	Name	Tenure	Courtesy title	Court Rank	kokudaka
Ogyū-Matsudaira clan, 1601-1638 (fudai)
1	Matsudaira Ienori (松平家乗)	1601–1614	Izumi-no-kami (和泉守)	Junior 5th Rank, Lower Grade (従五位下)	20,000 koku
2	Matsudaira Norinaga (松平乗寿)	1614–1638	Izumi-no-kami (和泉守)	Junior 5th Rank, Lower Grade (従五位下)	20,000 koku
Niwa clan, 1638-1702 (fudai)
1	Niwa Ujinobu (丹羽氏信)	1638 - 1646	Shikibu-shoyu (式部少輔)	Junior 5th Rank, Lower Grade (従五位下)	20,000 koku
2	Niwa Ujisada (丹羽氏定)	1646 - 1657	Shikibu-shoyu (式部少輔)	Junior 5th Rank, Lower Grade (従五位下)	20,000 ->19,000 koku
3	Niwa Ujizumi (丹羽氏純)	1657 - 1674	Shikibu-shoyu (式部少輔)	Junior 5th Rank, Lower Grade (従五位下)	19,000 koku
4	Niwa Ujiaki (丹羽氏明)	1674 - 1686	Nagato-no-kami (長門守)	Junior 5th Rank, Lower Grade (従五位下)	19,000 koku
5	Niwa Ujioto (丹羽氏音)	1686 - 1702	Izumi-no-kami (和泉守)	Junior 5th Rank, Lower Grade (従五位下)	19,000 koku
Ogyū-Matsudaira clan, 1686-1671 (fudai)
1	Matsudaira Noritada (松平乗紀)	1702–1716	Hyogo-no-kami (兵庫頭)	Junior 5th Rank, Lower Grade (従五位下)	20,000 koku
2	Matsudaira Norikata (松平乗賢)	1717–1746	Noto-no-kami (能登守)	Junior 4th Rank, Lower Grade (従四位下)	20,000 -> 30,000 koku
3	Matsudaira Norimori (松平乗薀)	1746–1781	Noto-no-kami (能登守)	Junior 4th Rank, Lower Grade (従四位下)	30,000 koku
4	Matsudaira Noriyasu (松平乗保)	1781–1826	Noto-no-kami (相模守); Jijū (侍従)	Junior 4th Rank, Lower Grade (従四位下)	30,000 koku
5	Matsudaira Noriyoshi (松平乗美)	1826–1842	Noto-no-kami (能登守)	Junior 5th Rank, Lower Grade (従五位下)	30,000 koku
6	Matsudaira Noritaka (松平乗喬)	1842 - 1855	Noto-no-kami (能登守)	Junior 5th Rank, Lower Grade (従五位下)	30,000 koku
7	Matsudaira Noritoshi (松平乗命)	1855 1871	Noto-no-kami (能登守)	Junior 5th Rank, Lower Grade (従五位下)	30,000 koku

== See also ==
- List of Han
- Abolition of the han system
