= Hayashi Akira =

Japanese scholar-diplomat

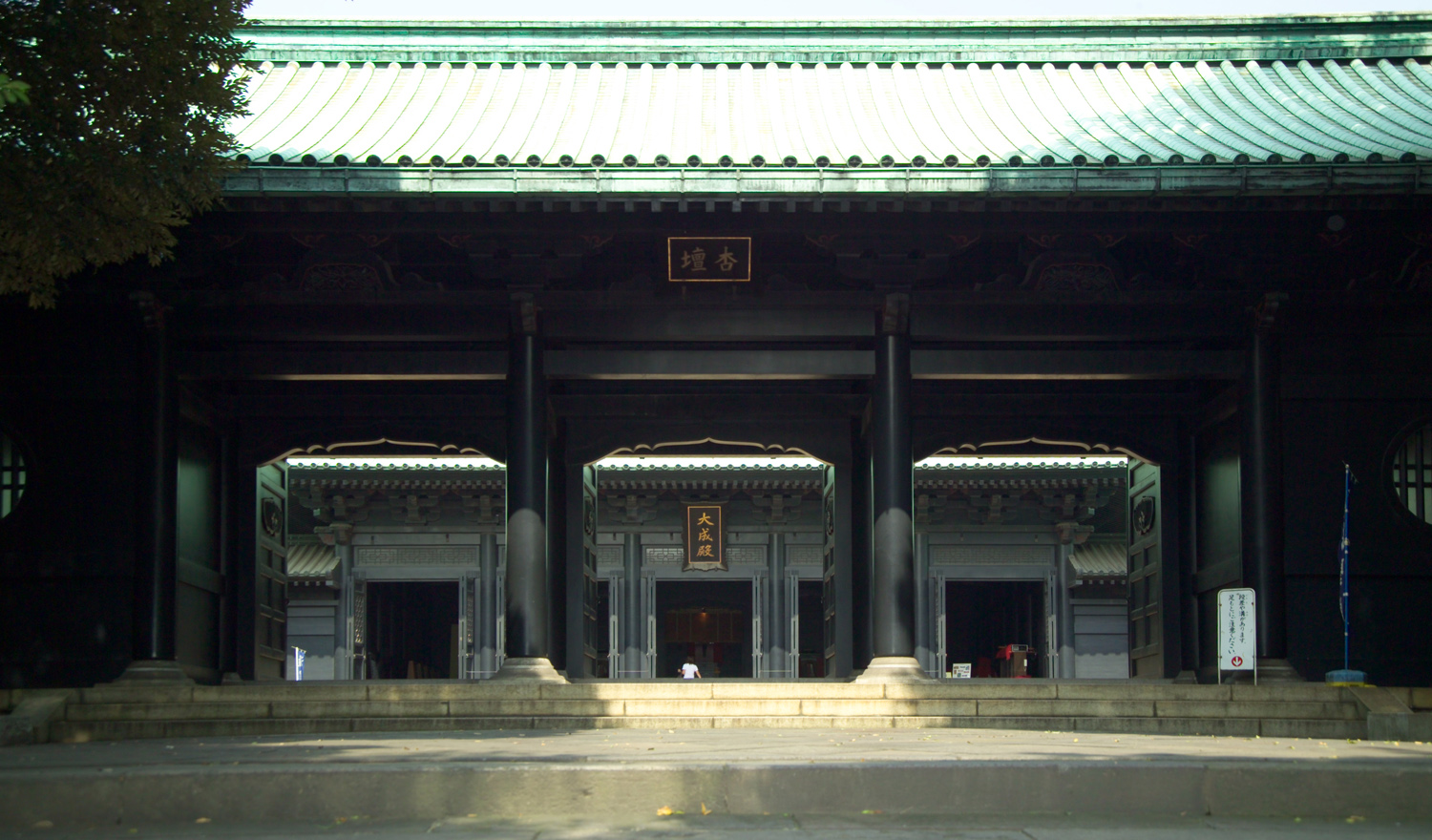
- Hayashi Akira, 9th rector of Yushima Seidō.
- Born: 1800
- Died: 1859 (aged 58–59); Edo
- Occupations: Neo-Confucian scholar, academic, administrator, writer, diplomat
- Writing career
- Subjects: Japanese history, literature

Hayashi Akira (林 韑; February 10, 1800 – October 12, 1859) (also known as Hayashi Fukusai) was an Edo period scholar-diplomat serving the Tokugawa shogunate in a variety of roles similar to those performed by serial Hayashi clan neo-Confucianists since the time of Tokugawa Ieyasu. He was the hereditary Daigaku-no-kami descendant of Hayashi Razan, the first head of the Tokugawa shogunate's neo-Confucian academy in Edo, the Shōhei-kō (Yushima Seidō).

== Academician ==
Hayashi Daigaku-no-kami Akira was a member of the Hayashi clan of Confucian scholars, each of whom were ad hoc personal advisers to the shōgun's prominent figures in the educational training system for the shogunal bureaucrats. The progenitor of this lineage of scholars was Hayashi Razan, who lived to witness his philosophical and pragmatic reasoning become a foundation for the dominant ideology of the bakufu until the end of the 19th century.

This evolution developed in part from the official Hayashi schema equating samurai with the cultured governing class (although the samurai were largely illiterate at the beginning of the Tokugawa shogunate). The Hayashi helped to legitimize the role of the militaristic bakufu at the beginning of its existence. His philosophy is also important in that it encouraged the samurai class to cultivate themselves, a trend which would become increasingly widespread over the course of his lifetime and beyond. One of Razan's aphorism encapsulates this view:

"No true learning without arms and no true arms without learning."

The Hayashi played a prominent role is helping to maintain the theoretical underpinnings of the Tokugawa regime; and Hayashi Daigaku-no-kami Akira was the 11th hereditary rector of Yushima Seidō.

== Diplomat ==
Akira assumed his role as rector of the academy in 1853; and his initial foray into diplomacy followed soon after.

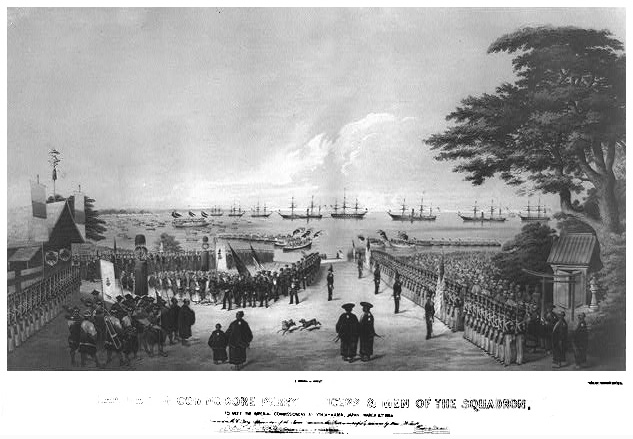
Landing of Commodore Perry, officers & men of the squadron, to meet the Imperial commissioners at Yokohama (Kanagawa) July 14, 1853. Lithograph by Sarony & Co., 1855, after Wilhelm Heine

- 1853 (Kaei 6): Akira completed Tsūkō ichiran. The work was created under orders from the shogunate to compile and edit documents pertaining to East Asian trade and diplomacy; and, for example, it includes a detailed description of a Ryukyuan tribute embassy to the Qing court in Beijing.
- March 8, 1854 (Kaei 7, 10th day of the 2nd month): Commodore Perry returned to Edo Bay to force Japanese agreement to the Treaty of Kanagawa; and the chief Japanese negotiator was Daigaku-no kami Hayashi Akira, who was known to the Americans as "Prince Commissioner Hayashi".

"Immediately, on signing and exchanging copies of the treaty, Commodore Perry presented the first commissioner, Prince Hayashi, with an American flag stating that this gift was the highest expression of national courtesy and friendship he could offer. The prince was deeply moved, and expressed his gratitude with evident feeling. The commodore next presented the other commissioners with gifts he had especially reserved for them. All business now having been concluded to the satisfaction of both delegations, the Japanese commissioners invited Perry and his officers to enjoy a feast and entertainment especially prepared for the celebration." -- from American eyewitness account of the event

- January 22, 1858 (Ansei 4, 28th day of the 12th month): Akira headed the shogunal delegation which sought advice from Emperor Kōmei in deciding how to deal with newly assertive foreign powers.

Significantly, this would have been the first time the emperor's counsel was actively sought since the establishment of the Tokugawa shogunate. The most easily identified consequence of this transitional overture would be the increased numbers of messengers which were constantly streaming back and forth between Tokyo and Kyoto during the next decade. There is no small irony in the fact that this 19th-century scholar/bureaucrat would find himself at a crucial nexus of managing political change—moving arguably "by the book" through uncharted waters with well-settled theories as the only guide.

- Ansei 4 (October 1858): Akira is dispatched from Edo to Kyoto to explain the terms of the treaty to Emperor Kōmei, who ultimately acquiesced in February 1859 when he came to understand that there was no alternative to acceptance.

== See also ==
- Matthew C. Perry
- https://reasonator.toolforge.org/?&q=122618125
- Sō Yoshiyori

== Notes ==
Preceded by Hayashi Sōkan	Rector of the Shogunate College; 18??–18??	Succeeded by Hayashi Gakusai
