= Yushima Seidō =

Confucian temple in Bunkyō, Tokyo, Japan

Coordinates: 35°42′03″N 139°45′59″E

- 湯島聖堂
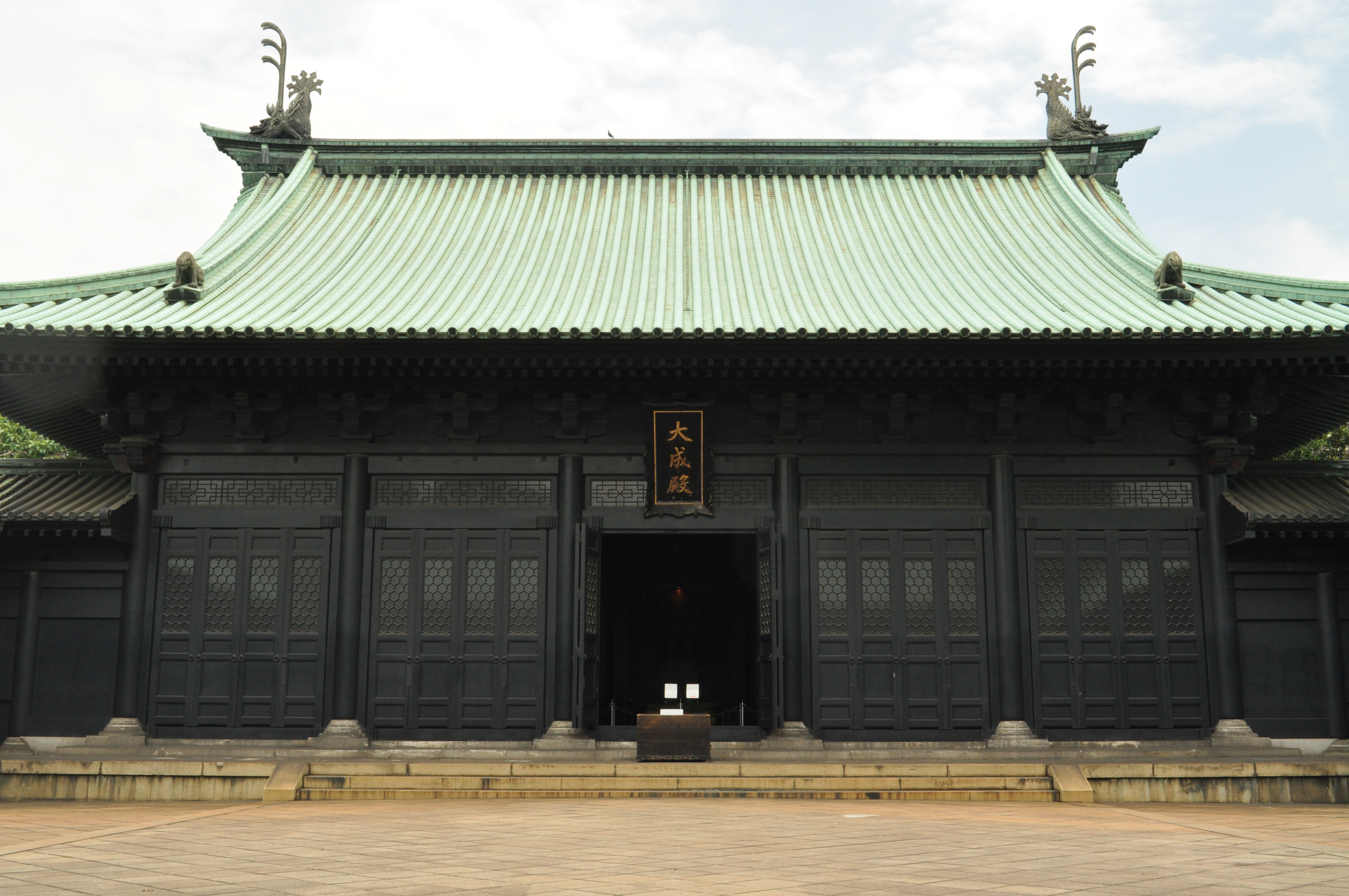
- Taiseiden (Main Hall) of the Yushima Seidō

- Location within Tokyo Location within Japan

Religion
- Affiliation: Confucianism
- Rite: Japanese Neo-Confucianism

Location
- Location: Bunkyō, Tokyo
- Country: Japan

Architecture
- Founder: Tokugawa Yoshinao
- Completed: 1632

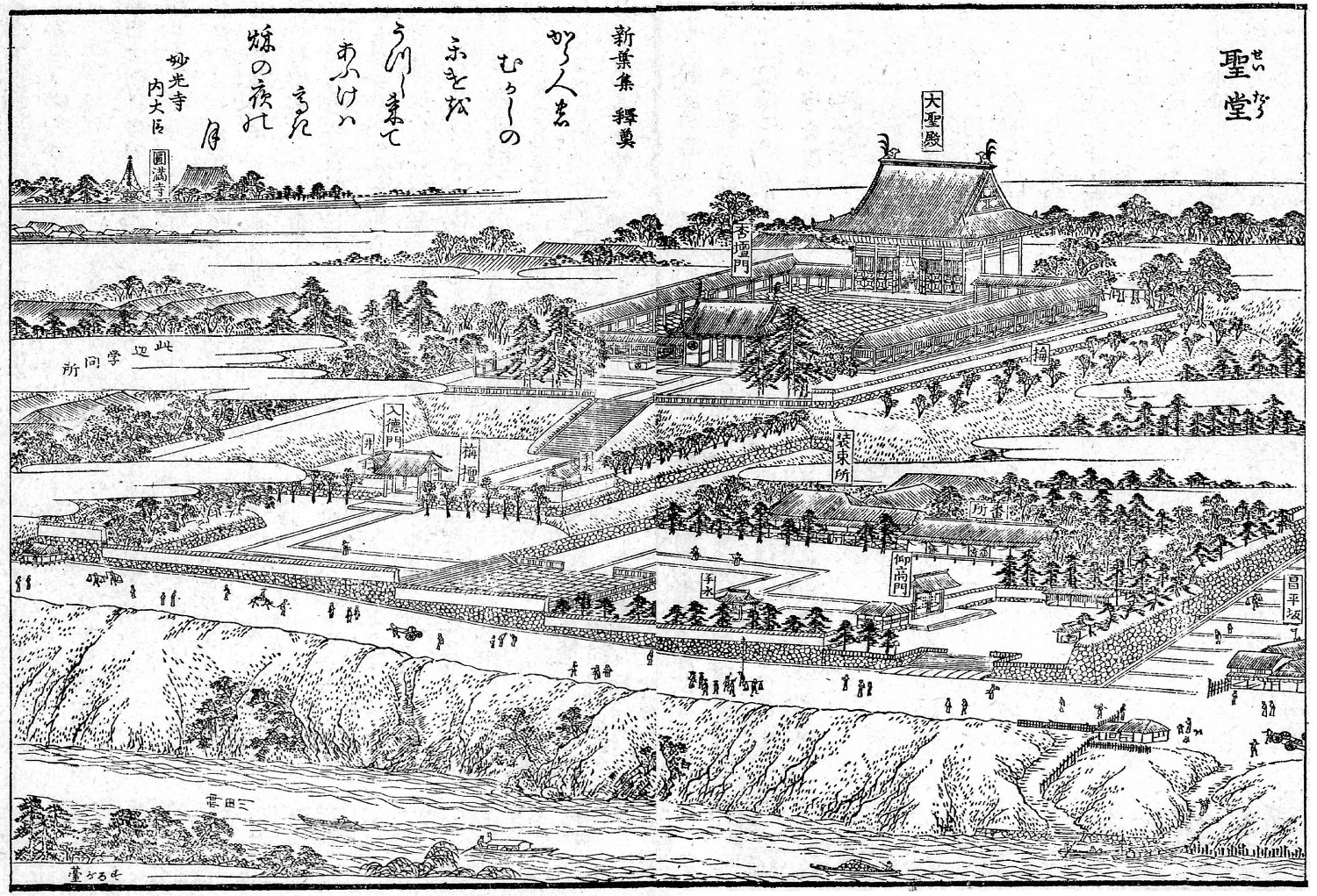
The Yushima Seido, c. 1830

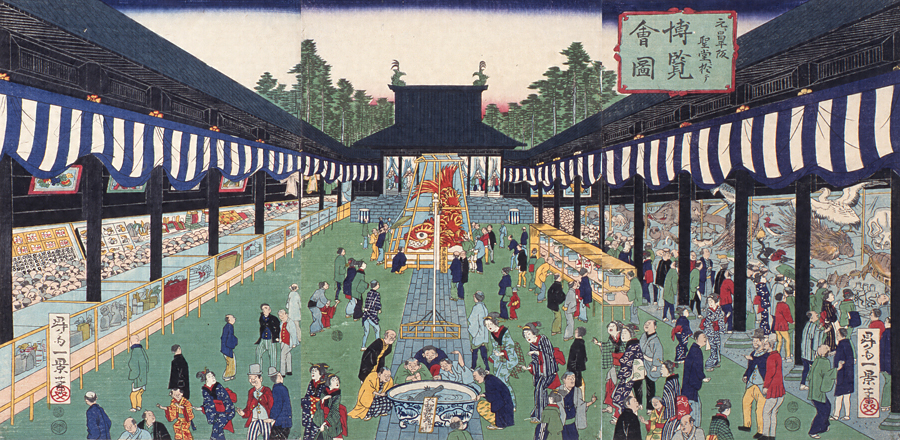
The 1872 exhibition at the Yushima Seido, considered the founding event of the Tokyo National Museum (ukiyo-e print)

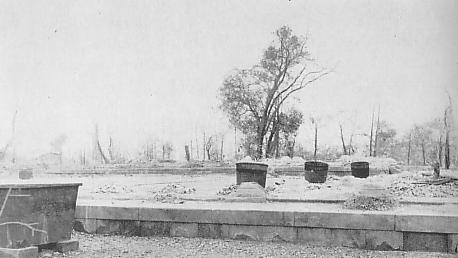
Ruins of the temple following the 1923 Great Kanto Earthquake

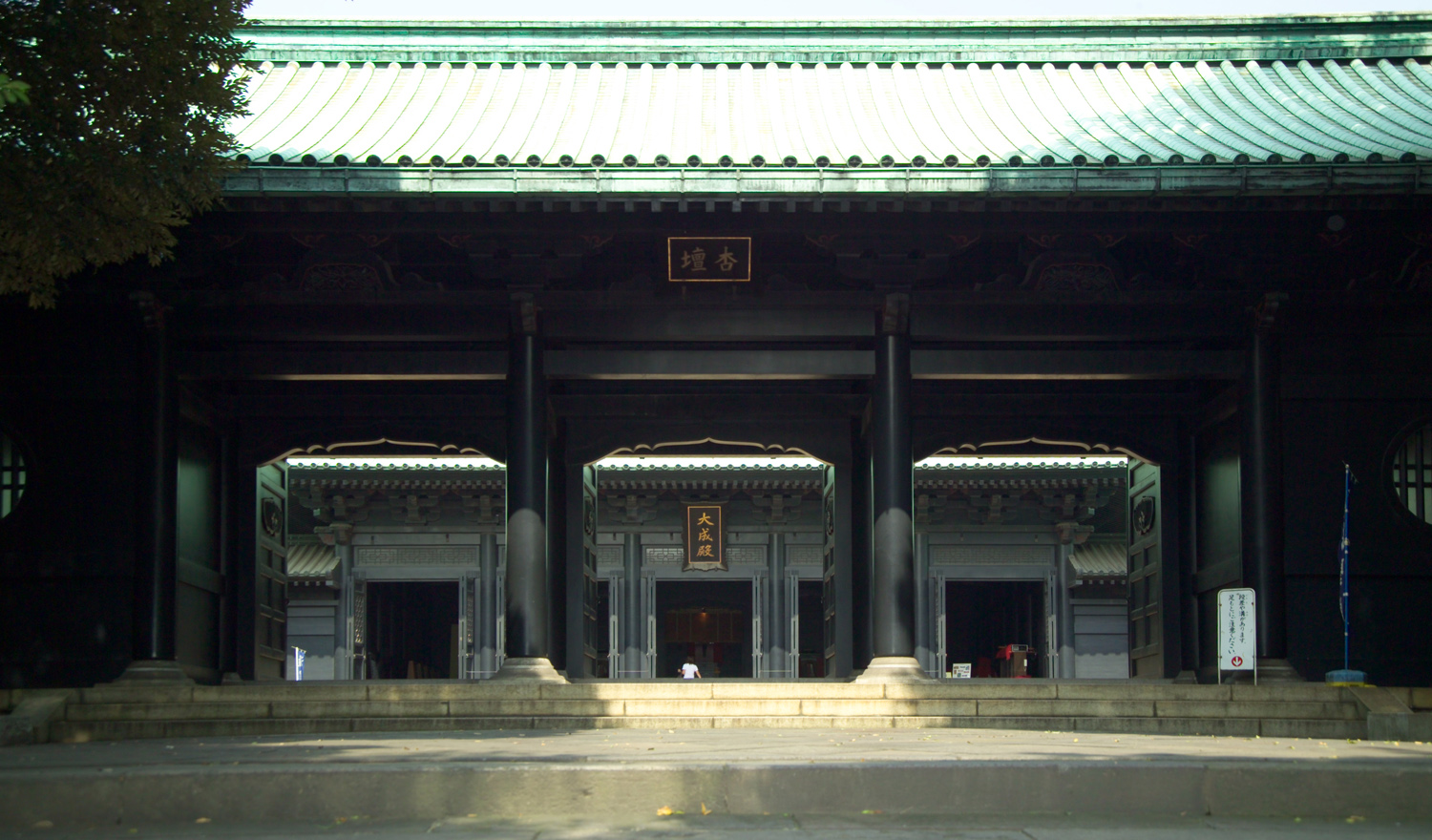
Entrance gate of present-day Yushima Seido

Yushima Seidō (湯島聖堂; lit. 'Yushima Sacred Hall'), is a Confucian temple (聖堂) in Yushima, Bunkyō, Tokyo, Japan. It was established in the late 17th century, during the Genroku era of the Edo period. Towards the late Edo period, one of the most important educational institutions of the shogunate, the Shōhei-zaka Gakumonjo (昌平坂学問所)), or Shōheikō (昌平黌), was founded on its grounds.

== Background ==
In 1632, Tokugawa Yoshinao, the 9th son of Tokugawa Ieyasu and daimyō of Owari Domain was granted permission to build an academy in Edo for the study and propagation of Confucianism. The first structure, the Sensei-den (先聖殿), constructed by the neo-Confucian scholar Hayashi Razan (1583–1657) in his grounds at Shinobu-ga-oka (now in Ueno Park). Under succeeding generations of Tokugawa shoguns and under the leadership of the Hayashi clan, Japanese Neo-Confucianism, particularly as developed in the teachings of Zhu Xi became the official orthodoxy and basis of the political philosophy of the Tokugawa shogunate.

The fifth shogun, Tokugawa Tsunayoshi, moved the building to its present site in 1691, where it became the Taiseiden (大成殿) of Yushima Seidō. The Hayashi school of Confucianism moved at the same time, and after the Kansei Edict solidified the position of neo-Confucianism the official philosophy of Japan, the school became a state-sponsored academy in 1797, the most important school of this kind in the country for the sons of hatamoto and many of the sons of various daimyo. The school was known as the Shōhei-zaka Gakumonjo (昌平坂学問所) or Shōheikō (昌平黌), after the supposed birthplace area of Confucius (昌平, Shōhei in Japanese). The rector of Shoheikō was for all intents and purposes at the head of the educational system in Edo. The academy covered a much larger area than the current grounds of the temple, including where the modern Tokyo Medical and Dental University stands. In addition to lectures at the academy, ceremonies were held in spring and autumn at the adjacent Confucian temple.

In 1871, after the Meiji Restoration, Neo-Confucianism fell from official favor and the academy was closed, although it is considered one of the direct precursors of the University of Tokyo, which was established five years later.

In 1872, Japan's first teachers college was built on the site of the academy. Part of the grounds became the site of Japan's first museum, which was later relocated to Ueno to become the Tokyo National Museum. The country's first library, the predecessor of the National Diet Library was also constructed on the grounds. The grounds became a National Historic Site in 1922. The surviving Edo period structures were all destroyed in the 1923 Great Kanto Earthquake. The current Yushima Seidō building was designed by Itō Chūta and was completed in 1935. The opening ceremony for the new building was attended by representatives of both the Republic of China and Manchukuo. Today, Tokyo Medical and Dental University occupies part of the grounds.

== Shōheikō ==
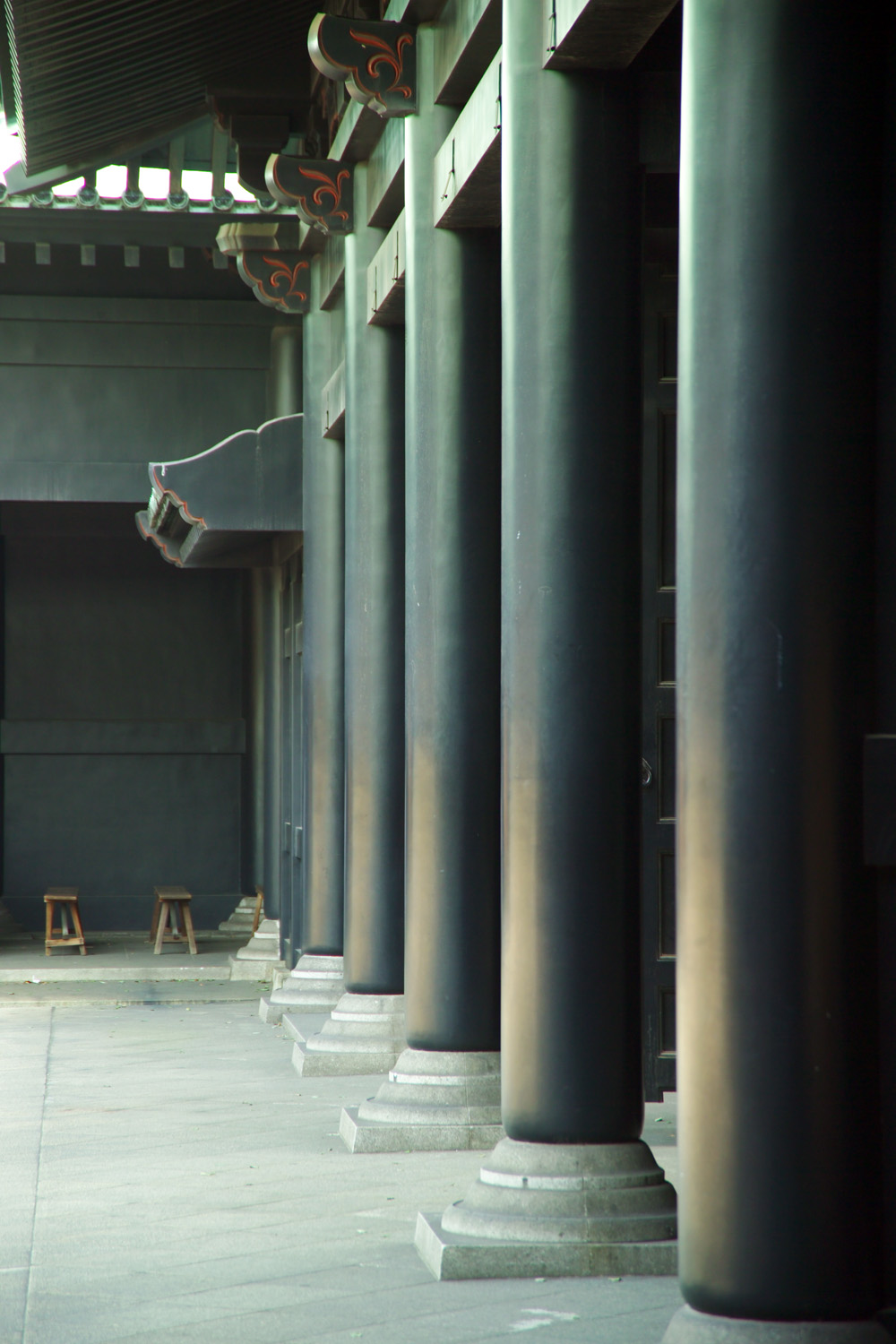
Colonnade along the courtyard sides

=== Education at Shōheikō ===
The school had three kinds of students: direct trainees of the Shogunate bureaucracy (稽古人, Keikonin), resident trainees (書生, Shosei) and free listeners (聴聞人, Chōmonjin) attending only open lessons. The Keikonin were from the hatamoto and gokenin families in Edo, direct vassals of the Shogunate. A small dormitory for them was available, but its capacity was limited, and most Keikonin students would commute daily from their Edo estates. A larger dormitory was available for the Shosei resident trainees, who were coming as scholarship students from all Han fiefs of the country. Besides lessons, the Shosei students lived on campus and spent a lot of time scholarly debating among themselves, naturally creating a strong alumni network spanning all over the country, which was key during the Meiji restoration.

An introduction by a Keikonin following by an interview by the teaching staff was needed to enroll the school. Courses were focusing on confucian teachings with in-depth studies from start to end of Chinese texts. Unsurprisingly, the Four books and Five classics were studied extensively. On top of lessons for the resident students and the Keikonin, there were open courses available to the common people every day.

Several kinds of examinations were performed, from the Sodokuginmi (素読吟味; litt."Reading examination"), held yearly to evaluate younger trainees and whether they could continue or not their studies, to the prestigious Gakumonginmi (学問吟味; litt. "Scholar examination"), held only 19 times in the whole history of the school.

=== Shōheikō alumni and scholars ===
- Saitō Chikudō
- Takasugi Shinsaku
- Akizuki Teijirō
- Kume Kunitake
- Kurimoto Jōun
- Kiyokawa Hachiro
- Matsumoto Keido
- Edayoshi Shinyo
- Mishima Choshu

== Institutional history after 1871 and legacy ==
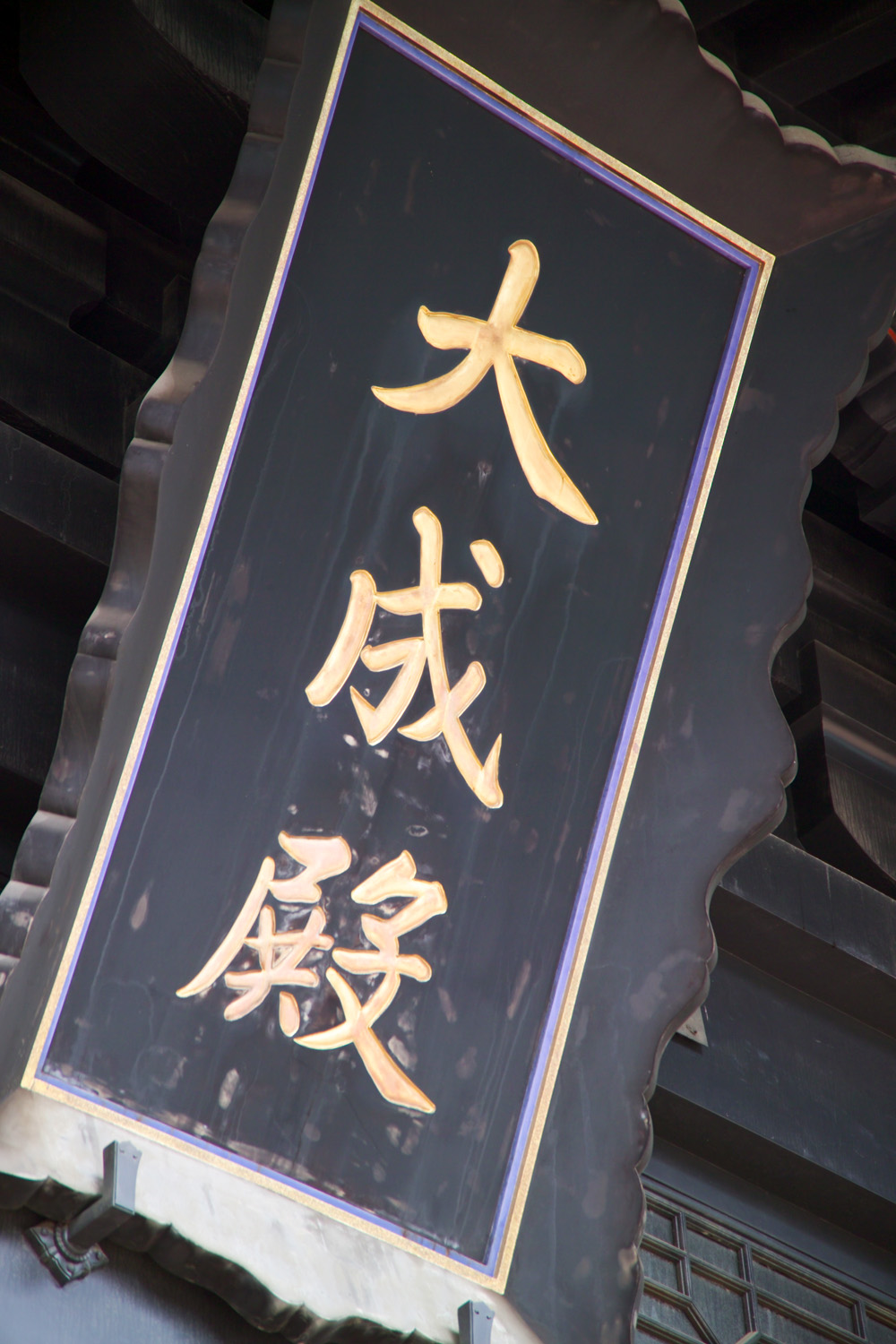
Tablet above the main entrance to the Taiseiden

The colour scheme of the original Taiseiden is believed to have been one of vermilion paint with verdigris. After being burnt down on a number of occasions, the Taiseiden was rebuilt in 1799 in the style of the Confucian temple in Mito, which used black paint. This building survived through the Meiji period, was used to host the Yushima Seidō Exposition in 1872, and was designated a national historical site in 1922, but was burnt down in the Great Kantō earthquake of the following year. The current Taiseiden is in reinforced concrete and was designed by Itō Chūta.

Since the Meiji restoration, Yushima Seidō has temporarily shared its premises with a number of different institutions, including the Ministry of Education, the Tokyo National Museum, and the forerunners of today’s Tsukuba University and Ochanomizu University (which is now in a different location but retains "Ochanomizu" in its name).

Inside the compound is the world's largest statue of Confucius, donated in 1975 by the Lions Club of Taipei, Taiwan. There are also statues of the Four Sages, Yan Hui, Zengzi, Kong Ji, and Mencius.

In the 1970s, the Taiseiden was used as the location for scenes in NTV's Monkey television series.

Along with the nearby Yushima Tenman-gū, the Yushima Seidō attracts students praying for success in their examinations.

== See also ==
- List of Historic Sites of Japan (Tōkyō)
- Zhu Xi (Chu Hsi) – neo-Confucianist teacher
- Fujiwara Seika – Japanese disciple of Zhu Xi
- Hayashi clan (Confucian scholars)
- Wagakukodansho, a shogunate-sanctioned education institute focused on Japanese classics and Japanese history
- Igakukan, a shogunate-sanctioned education institute focusing on traditional Chinese medicine
- Bansho Shirabesho, a late Edo period institute on the translation/study of foreign works
