= Historiographical Institute =

Research institution affiliated with the University of Tokyo

Coordinates: 35°42′45.74″N 139°45′47.76″E

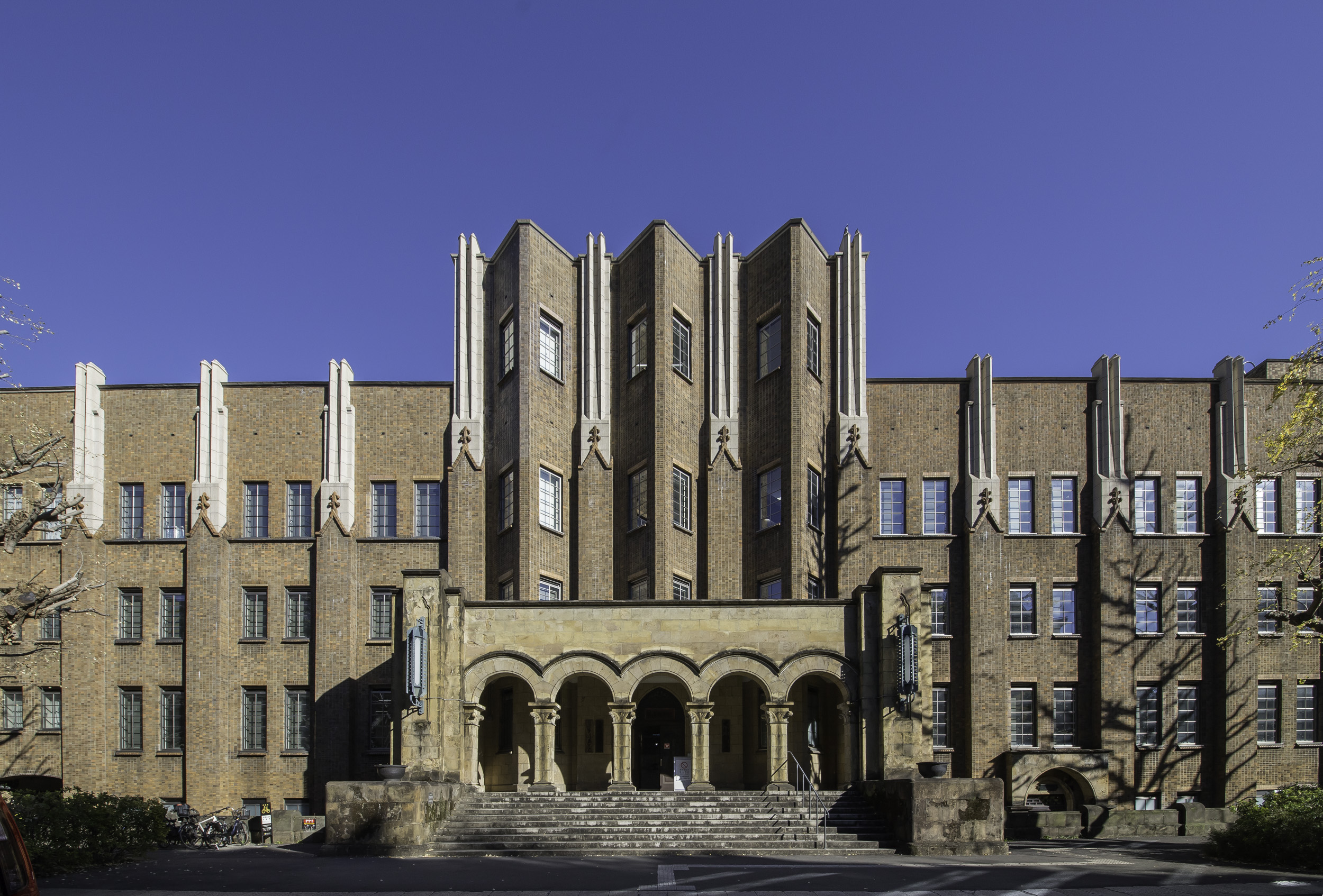
- Main building, built in 1928
- Parent institution: University of Tokyo
- Founder: Hanawa Hokiichi
- Established: 1793
- Chair: Yusuke Onoe
- Website: https://www.hi.u-tokyo.ac.jp/en/

The Historiographical Institute, University of Tokyo (東京大学史料編纂所, Tōkyō daigaku shiryō hensan-jo) is a research institution affiliated with the University of Tokyo that is devoted to the analysis, compilation, and publication of historical source materials concerning Japan. Since its foundation in 1869, the Institute has been a major center of Japanese historical research, and makes historical sources available through its library, publications, and databases.

== History ==
The Institute finds its origin in the Wagakukōdansho (和学講談所, Institute of Lectures of Japanese classics), founded in 1793 by the blind monk Hanawa Hokiichi.

In 1869, Emperor Meiji issued an Imperial rescript which explained the importance of historiography:

Historiography is a for ever immortal state ritual (taiten) and a wonderful act of our ancestors. But after the Six National Histories it was interrupted and no longer continued .... Now the evil of misrule by the warriors since the Kamakura period has been overcome and imperial government has been restored. Therefore we wish that an office of historiography (shikyoku) be established, that the good custom of our ancestors be resumed ....

An office of historiography, Shiryohenshukokushikoseikyoku (史料編輯国史校正局, Institute of compilation of national history documents), was set up on the site of the Wagakukōdansho and followed up on its works in the same year. The office changed a first time in 1875 to become the Shushikyoku (修史局, Office of Historical Compilation) and was abolished and re-established in 1877 as the Shushikan (修史館, House of Historical Compilation), which started to work on a national history, the Dai-Nihon hennenshi (Chronological History of Great Japan) in 1882, which later became part of the Dai-Nihon shiryō (described below). After several reorganizations, this office was transferred to Tokyo Imperial University in 1888; but in 1893, the Minister of Education terminated the work because of conflict between the government and the institute members over the aims and goals of history (also known as the Kume Kunitake Affair, named after the historian, Kume Kunitake, who was expelled from the Historiographical Institute for writing an article that challenged the customs of State Shinto, and was known for advocating a more "Western," scientific approach to history).

In 1895, the University decided to resume the work under the name Shiryō hensan-kakari, attached to the Faculty of Letters, limiting the role of the Historiographical Institute to compilation of historical materials, rather than the creation of a national history—the role that the Institute has today. The compilation of works was not limited to Japanese sources, but also included the compilation and translation of Western works as well—works which have had a vital role in shaping the nature of the history field in modern Japan.

In 1929, the present name of the Institute, Shiryō hensan-jo, was adopted; and in 1950, after several decades under the Faculty of Letters at the University, it acquired an independent status within Tokyo University.

Today, the Historiographical Institute continues to play a central role in the compiling, cataloging, and restoring of historical materials. Though most of the work focuses on the pre-modern period, historians of the Historiographical Institute have also done extensive work with regard to Meiji documents.

== Administrative leadership ==
The leadership of the Historiographical Institute has ensured that its contributions have been outstanding and productive for more than a century. These men were:

- Hanawa Hokiichi, 1793
- Hoshino Hisashi, April 1895–January 1899
- Mikami Sanji, January 1899–July 1919
- Kuroita Katsumi, July 1919–July 1920
- Tsuji Zennosuke, July 1920–March 1938
- Ryū Susumu, March 1938–March 1951
- Sakamoto Tarō, April 1951–March 1962.

In the years after Sakamoto Tarō, the indefinite term for headship has been revised—three-year terms from 1962 to 1971, and two-year terms since that time. The current director of the Institute is Masaharu Ebara.

== Departments of the Institute ==
The Institute is composed of five Research Departments, a Library, a Conservation Laboratory, a Center for the Study of Visual Sources, and an Administrative Office. Presently, the research staff consists of sixteen professors, seventeen associate professors, and twenty-three research associates.

The five research departments are: 1.) The Department of Ancient Materials, 2.) The Department of Medieval Materials, 3.) The Department of Early Modern Materials, 4.) The Department of Old Documents and Diaries, and 5.) The Department of Special Materials.

The Department of Ancient Materials is engaged in the study of historical materials concerning the Nara, Heian, and Kamakura periods (from the 9th to the 14th century). The Department of Medieval Materials is engaged in the study of historical materials concerning the Muromachi and Azuchi-Momoyama periods (from the 14th to the 17th century). The Department of Early Modern Materials is engaged in the study of historical materials concerning the Edo (Yedo) period (from the 17th to the 19th century). The Department of Old Documents and Diaries is devoted to the study of, obviously, old documents and diaries. Finally, the Department of Special Materials is devoted to the study of various special materials including cultural properties, Japanese old-style signatures, historical geography, and overseas materials relating to Japan.

== Publications ==
The Historiographical Institute has been responsible for the compilation and publication of a vast number of resources related to pre-modern Japanese history. A comprehensive list can be found here: http://www.hi.u-tokyo.ac.jp/hipub.html

The most important publication of the Historiographical Institute is the still-to-be-completed, 343+ volume Dai-Nihon shiryō. It consists of primary source material from the 887 to 1867, and is organized chronologically by major historical events. Institute members have been working on the Dai-Nihon shiryō ever since the foundation of the Shiryō hensan-jo in 1869; many of the Institute's publications (listed in the link above) are simply companions to the Dai-Nihon shiryō such as the Shiryō sōran, which is a chronological list of historical events that are used to categorize material in the Dai-Nihon shiryō. When completed, it will be the most comprehensive collection of Japanese historical materials ever. This collection primarily consists of primary sources, but also includes secondary sources, interpretative essays, and even fictional accounts when no other sources can be found. The variety of source materials in this work includes formal histories, government documents, letters, journals, biographies, temple records, and family archives.

The Dai-Nihon komonjo is a still-to-be-completed, 193+ volume supplement to the Dai-Nihon shiryō. It is divided into three subseries:

1. Hennen monjo, which includes documents from the 8th century
2. Iewake monjo, which comprises archival collections of families, temples, or shrines during the period covered by the Dai-Nihon shiryô; and
3. Bakumatsu gaikoku kankei monjo, which includes documents relating to Japan's foreign relations in the Bakumatsu period from 1853 to 1868.

The Dai-Nihon shiryō and Dai-Nihon komonjo, are the two largest compilations ever produced in Japan.

Other important publications are the Dai-Nihon kinsei shiryô, which is a compilation of historical materials of the Edo period, and the Dai-Nihon ishin shiryô, which is a compilation of historical materials leading up to and through the Meiji Restoration, from 1846-1871.

The Historiographical Institute also has a fifteen volume microfilm collection of historical documents relating to Japan in foreign countries.

== Library ==
The library of the Historiographical Institute consists of over four hundred thousand items. The publications listed above (and accessible through the online databases described below), are compilations of materials from this collection.

Bibliographical data of books cataloged since 1991 is retrievable through OPAC (The University of Tokyo Library Catalog) .

Reading Room Hours: 9:15- 17:00 (Monday through Friday)

According to its official website, those who may use the library include: 1) staff and students of the University of Tokyo; 2) those officially introduced by the governmental or educational institutions; and 3) those introduced by a member of the Institute.

== Online Databases ==
The online databases of the Historiographical Institute correspond to many of its publications. Access to them is provided here at: https://web.archive.org/web/20051119131025/http://www.hi.u-tokyo.ac.jp/cgi-bin/ships/LIB/std_m_ipcheck.pl. Below is a description of the two major databases, plus two important visual image databases.

=== Dai-Nihon shiryō database ===
Among the many specialized databases covering all periods of pre-modern Japanese history, the most important database is the Dai-Nihon shiryō database that corresponds to the mammoth, still-to-be-completed Dai-Nihon shiryō described above.

=== Dai-Nihon komonjo full-text database ===
This database corresponds to the Dai-Nihon komonjo described above, a supplement to the Dai-Nihon shiryō.

=== Visual Image Databases ===
The Historiographical Institute includes a number of visual image databases. Two important databases are:

- Koshashin (old pictures and photographs) database
  - This database is a collection of old pictures and photographs that span from bakumatsu (the end of the Tokugawa era) through the Meiji period.
- Shiryō hensan-jo shozō shozōga mohon (portrait) database
  - This is a portrait database of people from that spans from the 9th century until the 19th century. You can search by title of the work and by the name of the person.

NOTE: Remote access to the Historiographical Institute databases is often fickle.

== Dictionary of Sources of Classical Japan ==
Though it is still in draft form, the Dictionary of Sources of Classical Japan is an excellent resource for finding definitions and terms from pre-modern Japanese history and literature. Please follow the link above for more details.

== Address ==
The address of the Historiographical Institute is:

- 3-1, Hongo 7-chōme
- Bunkyō, Tokyo
- 113-0033, JAPAN

== See also ==
- Philosophy of History
- Historiography of Japan
- International Research Center for Japanese Studies
- List of National Treasures of Japan (ancient documents)
