= Gunsho Ruijū =

Compilation of Japanese literature and history

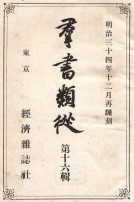
Cover page of the 16th volume of a 1901 edition of Gunsho Ruiju

Gunsho Ruijū (群書類従) is a collection of old Japanese books on Japanese literature and history assembled by Hanawa Hokiichi (塙保己一) with the support of the bakufu.

It has several sections separated in genres such as Shinto (the native Japanese religion) or waka poetry.

A short list is below:

- Shinto documents
- Imperial documents
- Bunin (appointment documents)
- Keifu (genealogy documents)
- Den (legend documents)
- Kanshoku (government posts documents)
- Ritsuryō (codes and laws)
- Kuji (public duties documents)
- Shozoku (costume documents)
- Bunpitsu (literature)
- Shosoku (letters)
- Waka (style of poetry)
- Renga (linked verse poetry)
- Monogatari (tales)
- Nikki (diaries)
- Kiko (travel documents)
- Kangen (Japanese court music)
- Kemari (a game played in the Heian period)
- Taka (hawking documents)
- Yuge (play/games of skill documents )
- Onjiki (eating and drinking and cooking documents)
- Kassen (war documents)
- Buke (samurai documents)
- Shakuji (Buddhist names documents)
- Zatsu (miscellaneous documents)

The first series in 1819 has 25 subjects with 1273 works. A modern print edition was published in 19 volumes from 1894 to 1912.

A second series of another 2103 texts was created by his son Hanawa Tadatomi (塙忠宝) from 1821 under the title Zoku Gunsho Ruijū (続群書類従). Another series, the Zoku Zoku Gunsho Ruijū (続々群書類従), was assembled in two parts, the first with 16 subjects in 1903–4 in 5 volumes, the second in 1906–9 with 304 sources in 16 volumes. Shin Gunsho Ruijū (ja:新群書類従) was printed in 1906–08 in 10 volumes.

Another text collection begun by Hanawa Tadatomi is the Dai Nihon Shiryō.

== See also ==
- Wagakukōdansho
- Taishō Tripiṭaka
- Genkō yōshi was born from this books' printing plate.
