= Bansho Shirabesho =

Japanese organization

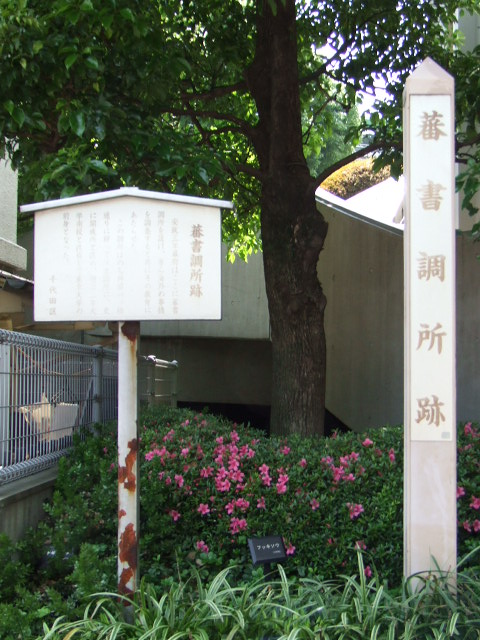
A marker denoting the site of the institute

The Bansho Shirabesho (蕃書調所), or "Institute for the Study of Barbarian Books," was the Japanese institute charged with the translation and study of foreign books and publications in the late Edo Period.

== Origin ==
The institute was founded in 1856 that catered to the samurai youth. It emerged out of the previous translation bureau called Yogakusho, which also previously replaced the Banshowagegoyo. The launch of the new institute was a reaction to the unimpeded arrival of the American warships in 1853 under the command of Admiral Matthew C. Perry. The foreigners also brought with them gifts, which baffled and unsettled the Tokugawa regime as they exposed the inferior state of the Japanese coastal defense.

Bansho Shirabesho functioned as a sort of bureau of the Tokugawa Shogunate and considered a politically charged institution that emerged from the perceived imposition of foreignness on Japanese body politic. The establishment of Bansho Shirabesho as an independent institution was also partly attributed to the removal of the translation of sensitive military and political secrets from the Bureau of Astronomy. The activities and norms of the institution intersected with the translation initiatives of employed translators.

The school eventually became the main institution of Western learning sponsored by the shogunate. It attracted some of the most outstanding scholars studying Dutch scientific works and documents, who also later studied English, French, German, and Russian texts.

== Later period ==
It was renamed Yōsho shirabesho (洋書調所) (institute for the study of Western books) in 1862, and Kaiseijo (開成所) in 1863. After the Boshin War, it was again renamed and became the Kaisei gakkō (開成学校), which was managed under the Government of Meiji Japan. As the Kaisei gakkō, the institute became one of the predecessor organizations which merged to form University of Tokyo.

== See also ==
- Shōheikō, the shogunate school for its bureaucrats
- Wagakukōdansho, a Tokugawa-sanctioned institute of literature and history
- Igakukan, Tokugawa school of medicine
