= Hanawa Hokiichi =

Japanese philosopher

- 塙 保己一
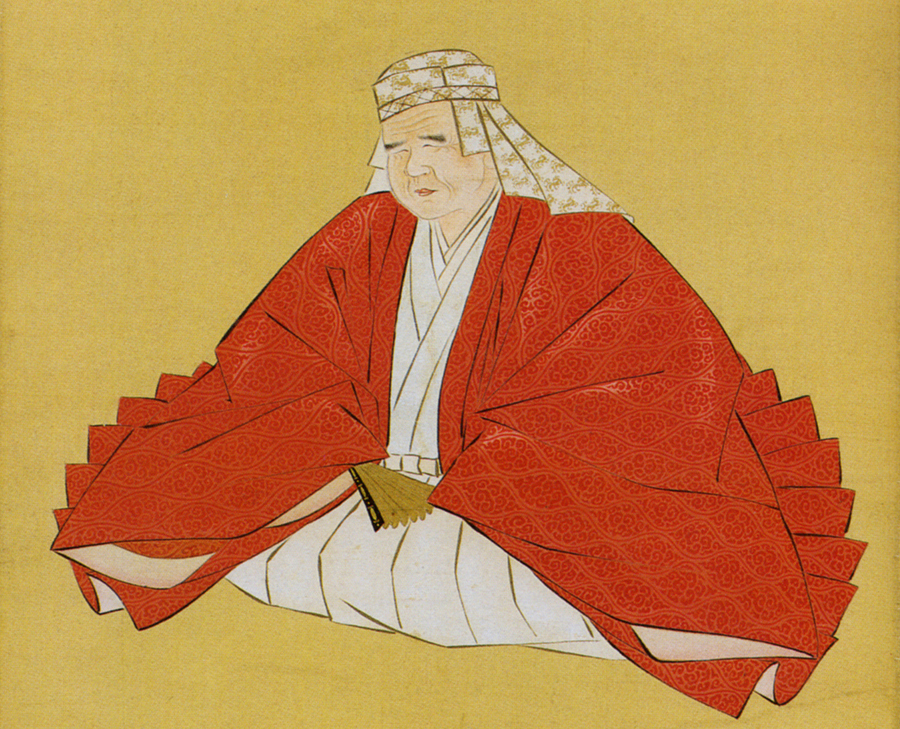
- Born: June 23, 1746; Musashi Province, Japan
- Died: October 7, 1821 (aged 75)
- Occupation: Scholar
- Years active: Edo Period

Academic work
- Discipline: History, literature, medical science and jurisprudence

Hanawa Hoki(no)ichi (塙保己一; Japanese pronunciation: [ha.na.wa (|) ho.kʲiꜜ.i.tɕi, -ho.kʲi.noꜜ.i.tɕi], 23 June 1746 – 7 October 1821) was a Japanese blind kokugaku scholar of the Edo period.

== Biography ==
Hanawa was born in Hokino Village, Musashi Province (present day Kodama, Honjō, Saitama) to a farming family. His childhood name was Toranosuke. From an early age he had a weak constitution and at the age of five suffered from a sickness which caused great eye pain and his vision gradually diminished. He was advised that his eyes would not be cured unless he changed both his birth year and his name. Although he changed his name to Tatsunosuke and subtracted two years from his age, his vision never returned. A precocious child with a prodigious memory, he was later tonsured and took the Buddhist name of Tamonbo. He learned to read and write by tracing letters on the palm of his hand, and to distinguish the flowers by shape and smell. At the age of ten, he was to be sent to study in Edo, but this was opposed by his parents who had no money. He delayed his departure until after this mother's death in 1757. She had left him 23 copper mon as his inheritance, a trivial sum, but he was able to obtain a position as a reciter of war ballads (such as the Taiheiki) in the household of a wealthy silk merchant, and moved to Edo in 1760 at the age of 15.

While in Edo, his early teacher was the noted kokugaku scholar Ametomi Sugaichi, who ran a school training blind people massage, acupuncture, and music. However, Hanawa was unable to succeed at any of these endeavors, and attempted to commit suicide in despair. He was dissuaded by his teacher, who made him promise that he would give an effort for three more years, and to whom he discussed his academic interests. Ametomi arranged for him to study kokugaku and waka poetry under Hagiwara Sogo, Chinese studies and Shinto under Kawashima Kibayashi, jurisprudence under Yamaoka Yasuaki, medicine at the temple of Tōzen-ji in Takanawa, and other disciplines under other leading scholars. As Hanawa could not read any books, he memorized what was read aloud to him. He so impressed a member of the hatamoto that he received a 40-volume set of the Eiga Monogatari as a present. In 1766 he was able to make a pilgrimage to Ise Shrine with his father for 60 days, continuing on to visit Kyoto, Osaka, and Mount Koya. In 1769, he became a student of Kamo no Mabuchi. In 1775, he changed his name to Hanawa Hokiichi. In 1779, Hanawa began work on compilation of the "Gunsho Ruijū" (群書類従 Great collection of old documents). This effort was to occupy him for the next 40 years and the final version was 670 volumes. In 1793, he founded the Wagakukōdansho institute, and became its first head.

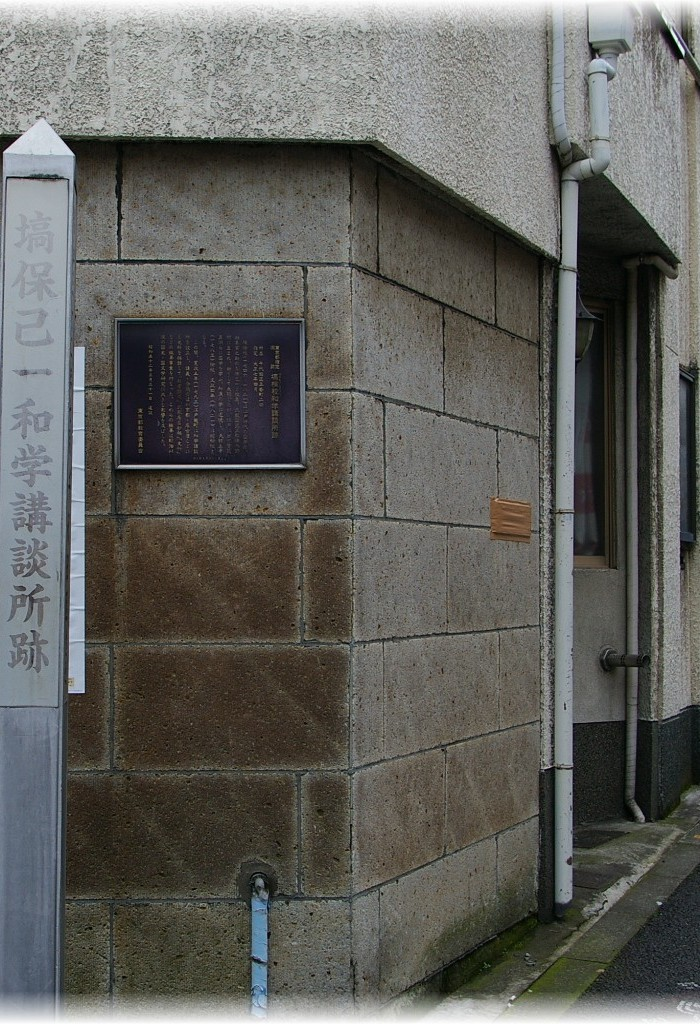
The monument of the site of Hanawa Hokiichi Wagakukōdansho（Chiyoda, Tokyo）

== Hanawa Hokiichi former residence ==
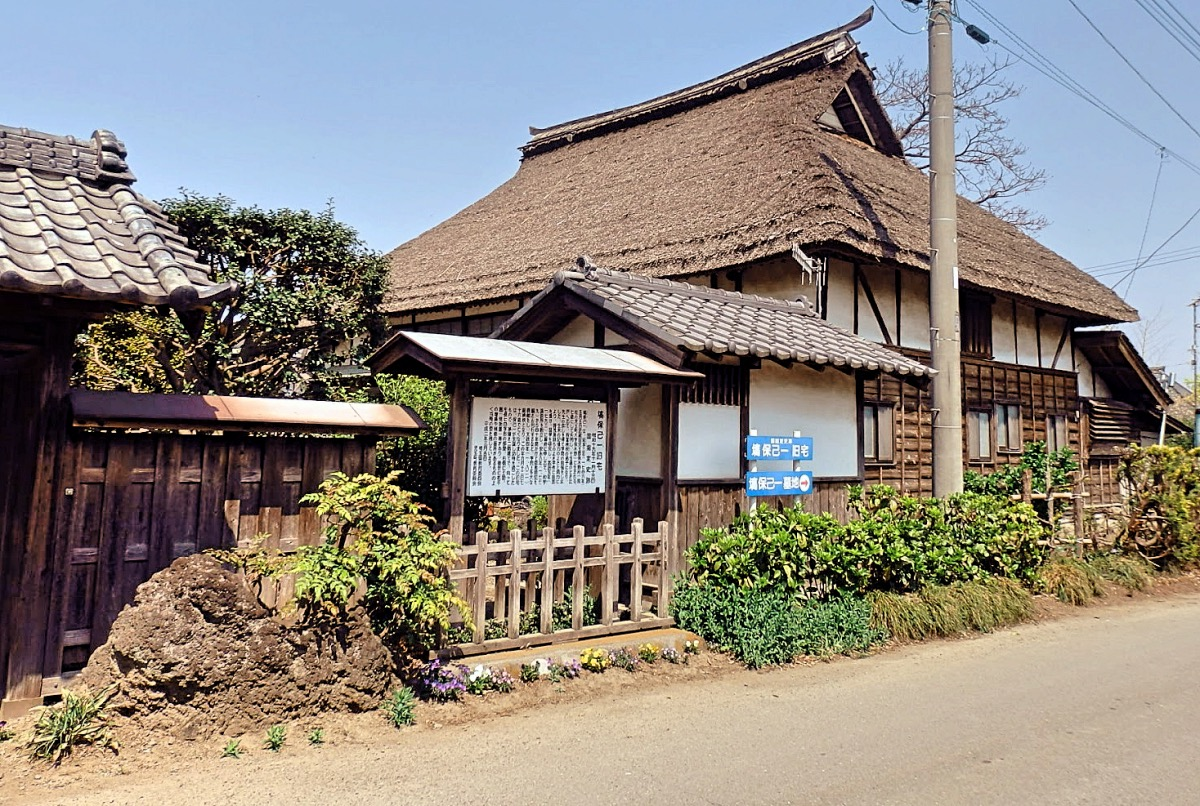
Hanawa Hokiichi former residence

Hanawa Hokiichi's birth home in Honjō was made into a memorial museum and was proclaimed a National Historic Site in 1944.

== As Helen Keller's role model ==
In 1937, Helen Keller came to Japan and visited Hokiichi's memorial house. She expressed her impression as follows: "When I was a child, my mother told me that Mr. Hanawa should be my role model. To visit this place and touch his statue was the most significant event during this trip to Japan. The worn desk and the statue facing down earned more respect of him. I believe that his name would pass down from generation to generation like a stream of water."

== Memorial Museum ==
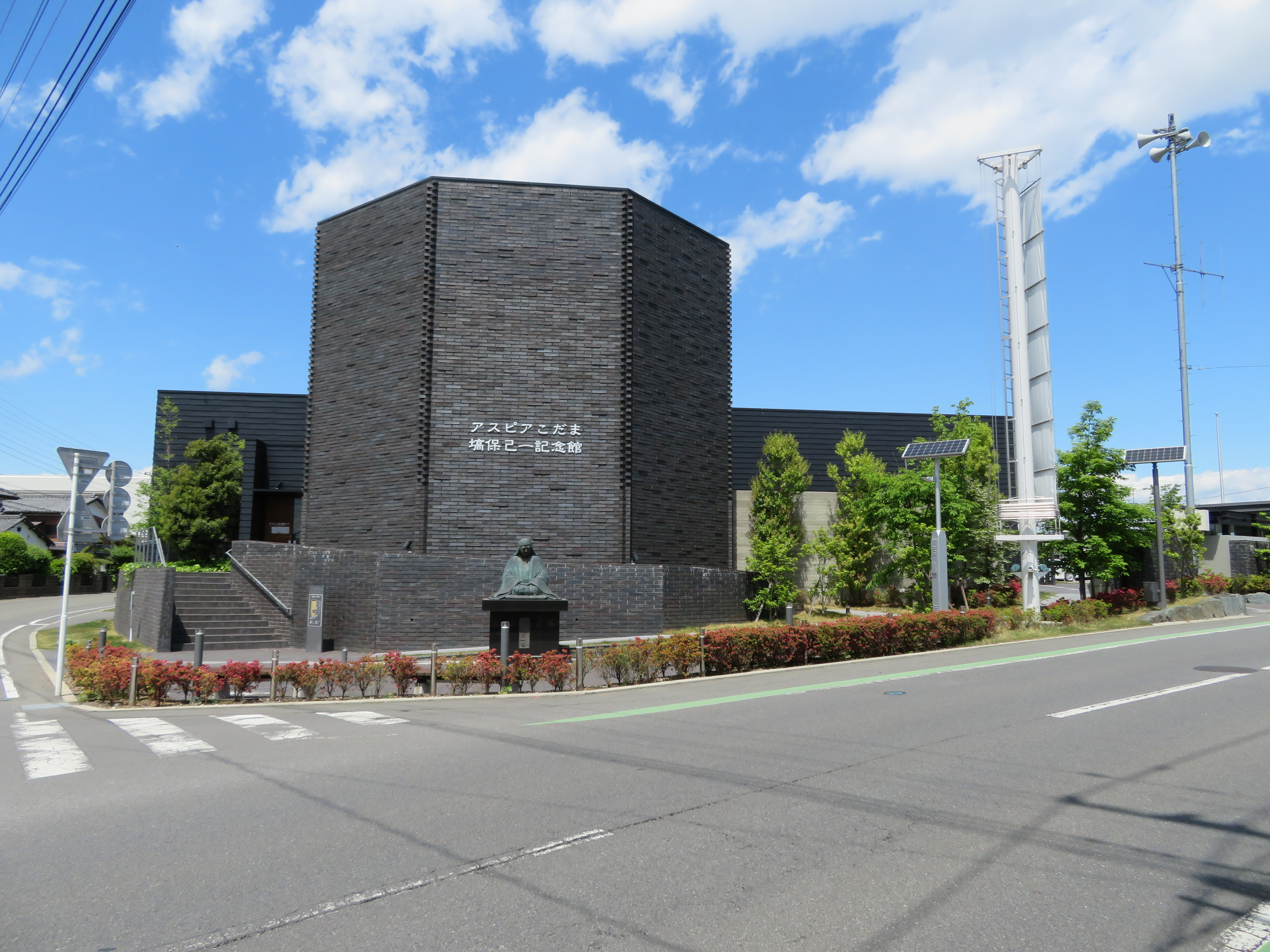
Hanawa Hokiichi Memorial Museum

Hanawa Hokiichi Memorial Museum is in Honjō, Saitama.

== See also ==
- Kokugaku
- Kamo no Mabuchi
- Wagakukōdansho
- Hanawa Hokiichi Memorial Museum (ja)
