= Koyasan Tokyo Betsuin =

Buddhist temple in Tokyo, Japan

Coordinates: 35°38′5.92″N 139°44′2.54″E

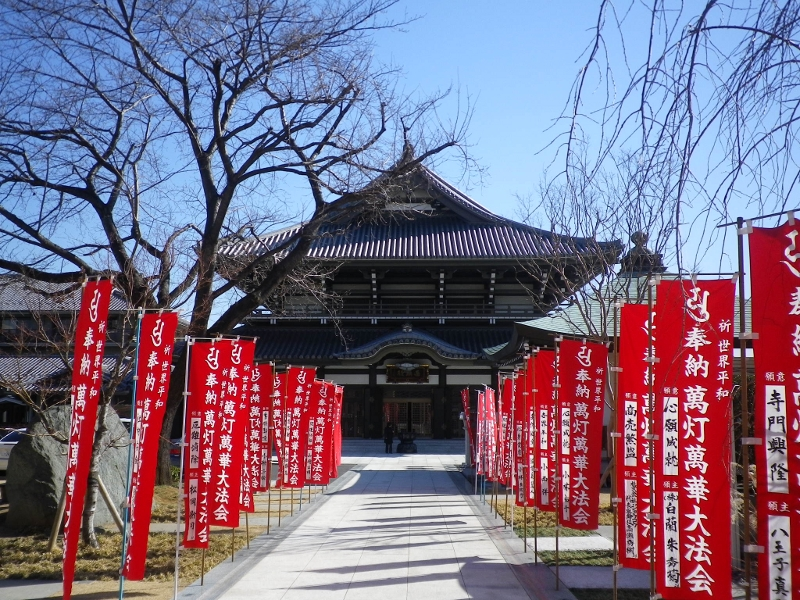
Tokyo Branch of Kōyasan Kongōbu-ji temple

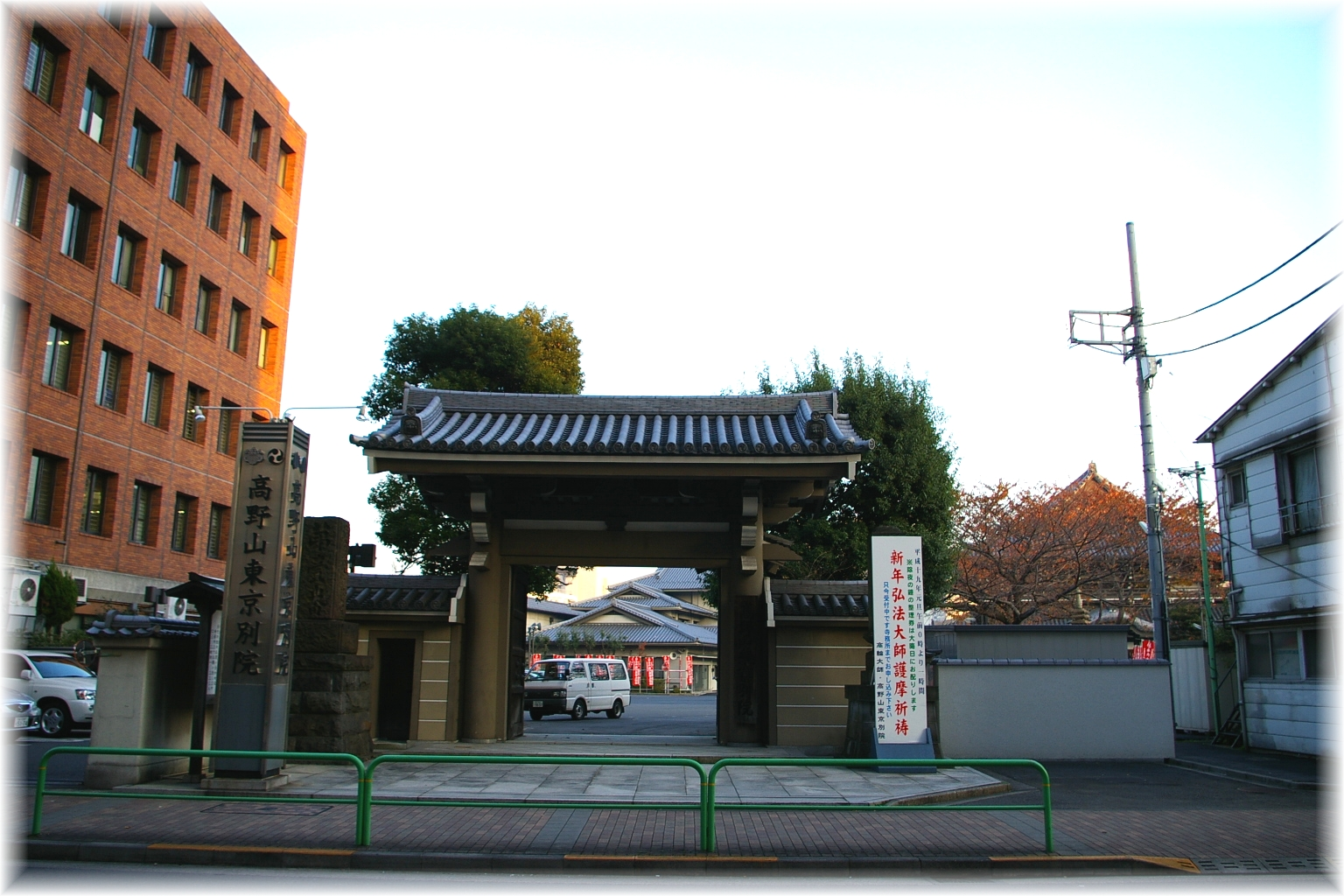
Sanmon gate

Kōyasan Tokyo Betsuin (高野山東京別院, Kōyasan Tōkyō Betsuin, "Kōyasan Tokyo Branch Temple") is a temple located in Minato Ward at Takanawa 3-15-18 (facing Nihonenoki dori) in Tokyo. It belongs to the Kōyasan Shingon school of Japanese Buddhism, and the principal image is Kūkai. The head temple of this betsuin is Kongōbu-ji in Wakayama Prefecture. It stands next to the Takanawa Police Station.

== History ==
In the Keicho era (1596-1615), it established in Asakusa Nichirin Temple as the Edo duty place of Kōyasan's learning priest. In the first year of the Meireki Era (1655), the temple was bestowed the land in Nihon enoki at Shiba by Shogunate, then was named Kōyasan Edo Zaibansho Kōya-ji.

== Position in various pilgrimage circuits ==
- Go-Funai 88-kasho - 1st place (御府内八十八箇所 - 1番札所)
- Kanto 88-kasho - Special Sacred Place (関東八十八箇所 - 特別霊場)
- Edo 33-kasho - 29th place (The card place principal image: The Seikanzeonbosatsu (聖観世音菩薩) Shokan world sound bodhisattva 江戸三十三箇所 - 29番札所)
