= Maruyama Shrine =

Shinto shrine in Tokyo, Japan

Maruyama Shrine (丸山神社)
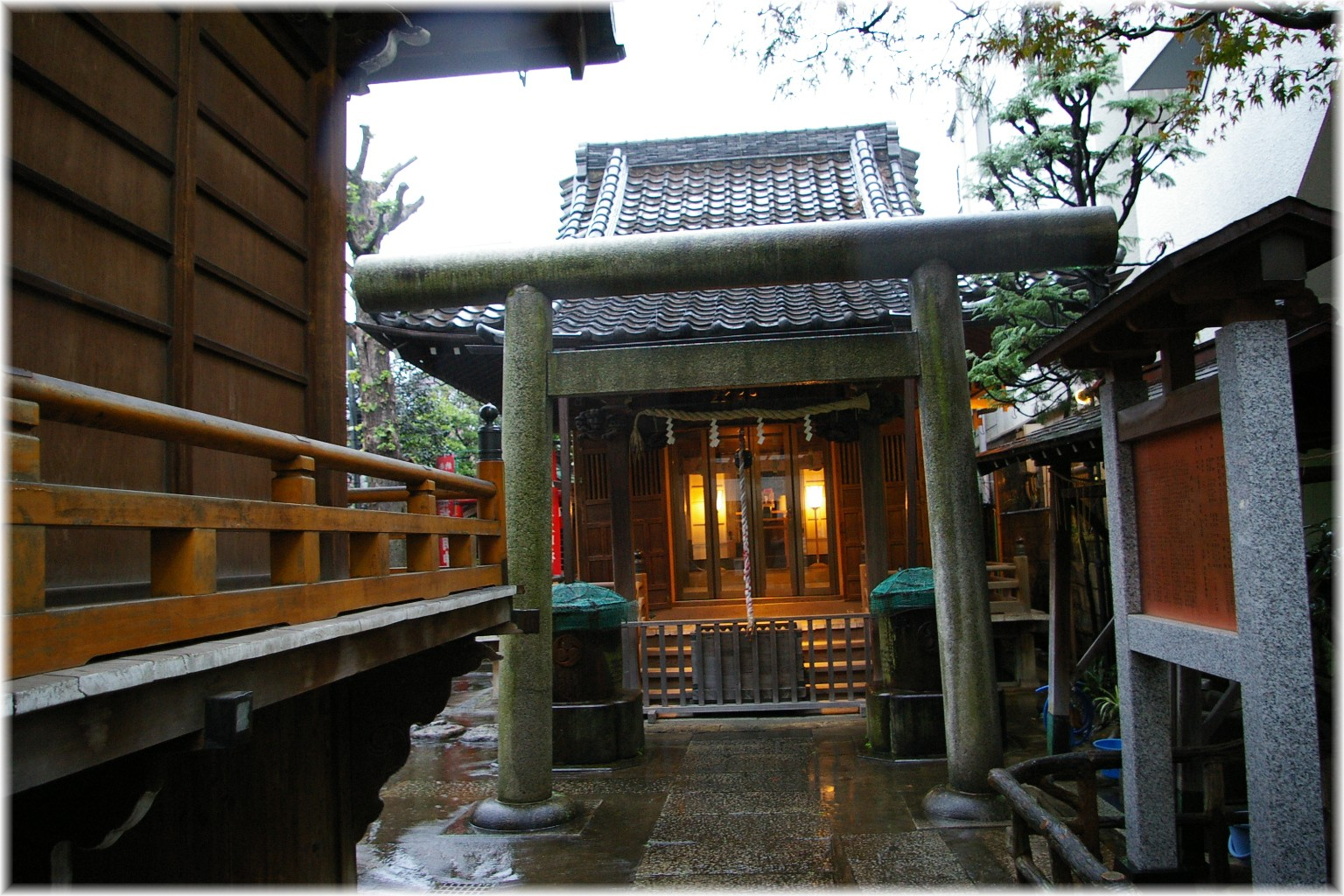
- Maruyama Shrine

- Location within Japan

Religion
- Affiliation: Shinto

Location
- Interactive map of Maruyama Shrine (丸山神社)
- Coordinates: 35°38′17.58″N 139°44′1.32″E

Maruyama Shrine (丸山神社) is a Shinto shrine in Takanawa, Minato, Tokyo, Japan. The shrine was established in 1594 at the order of Tokugawa Ieyasu.

== Gallery ==
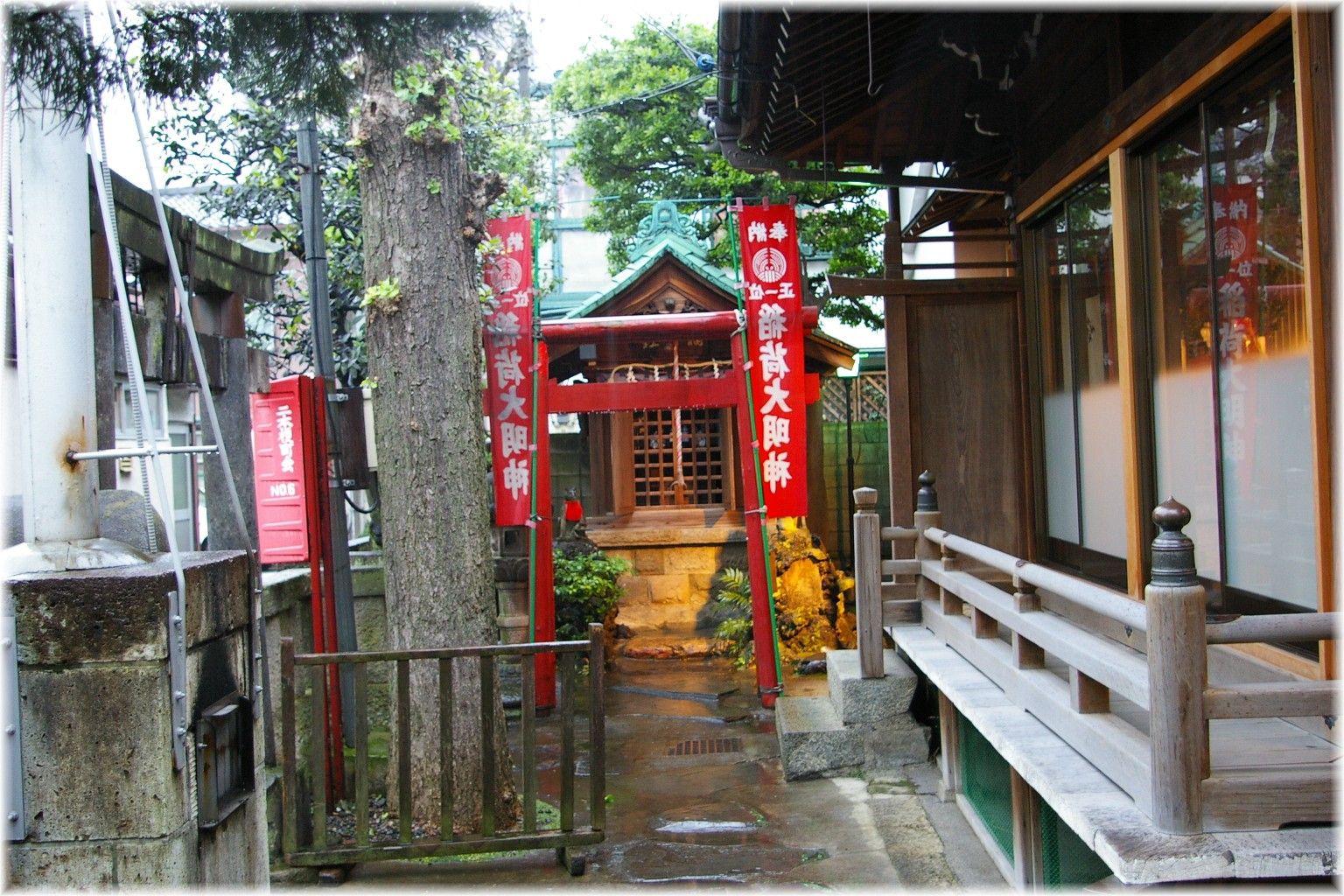
Inari Daimyojin

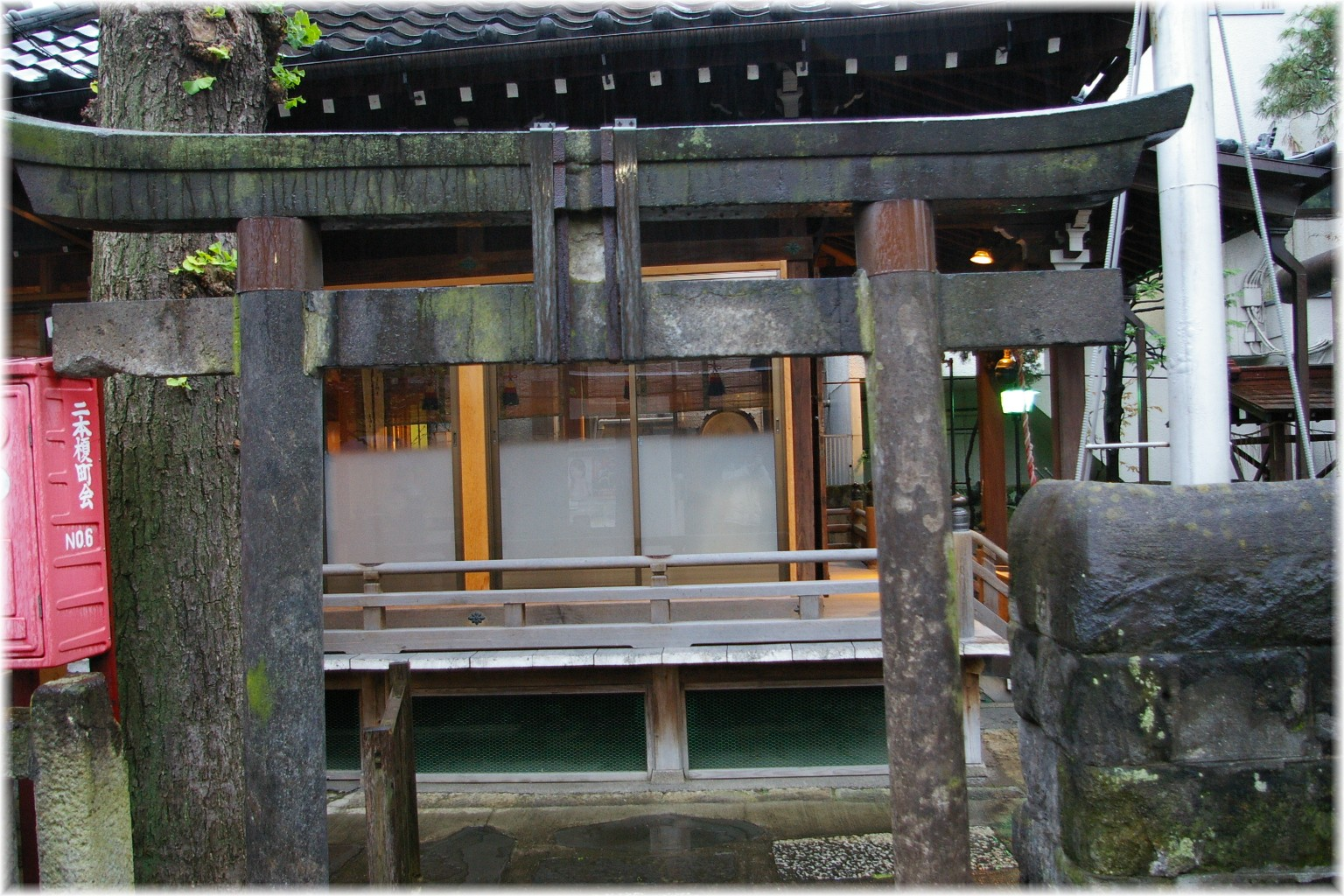
Torii gate

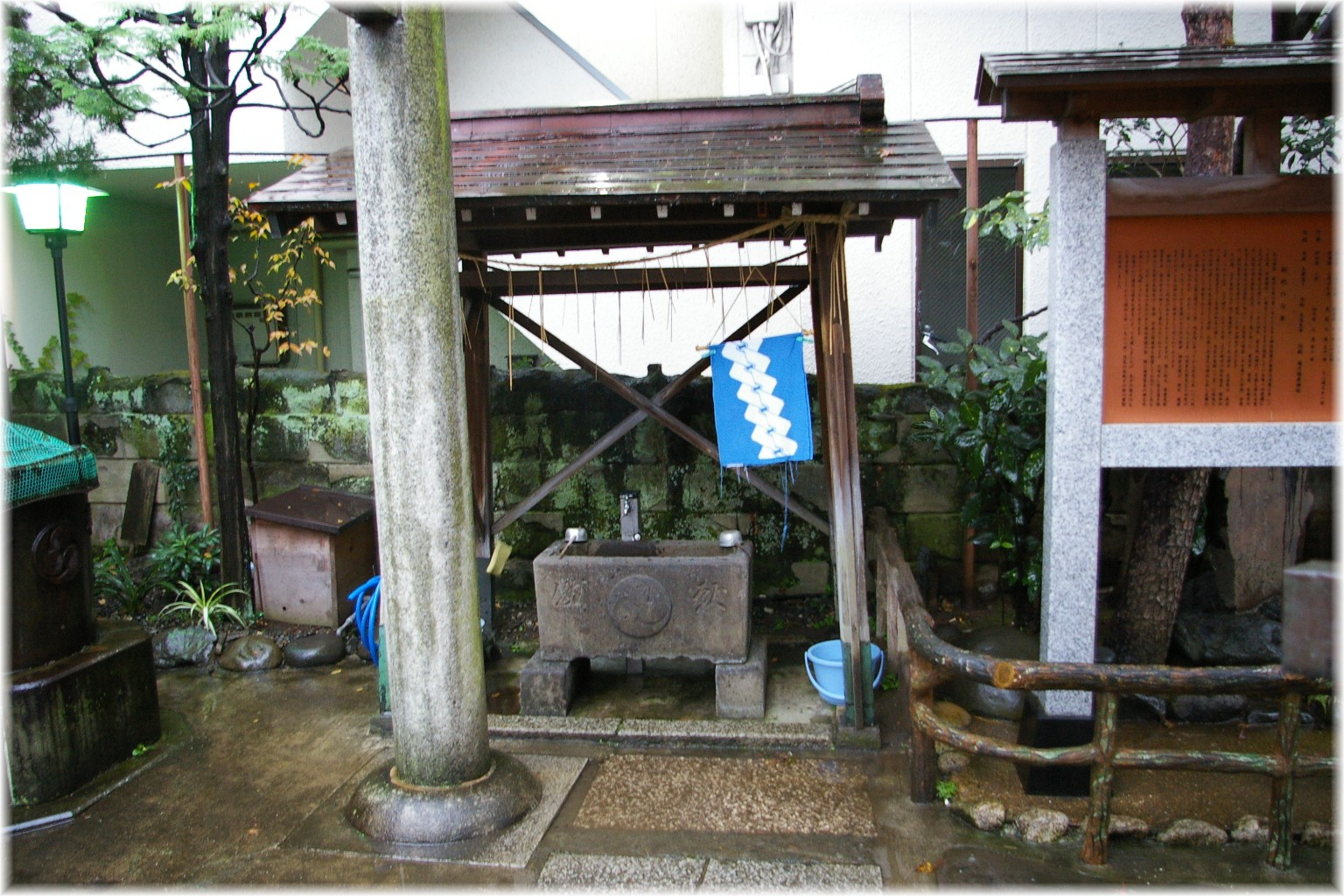
Temizuya

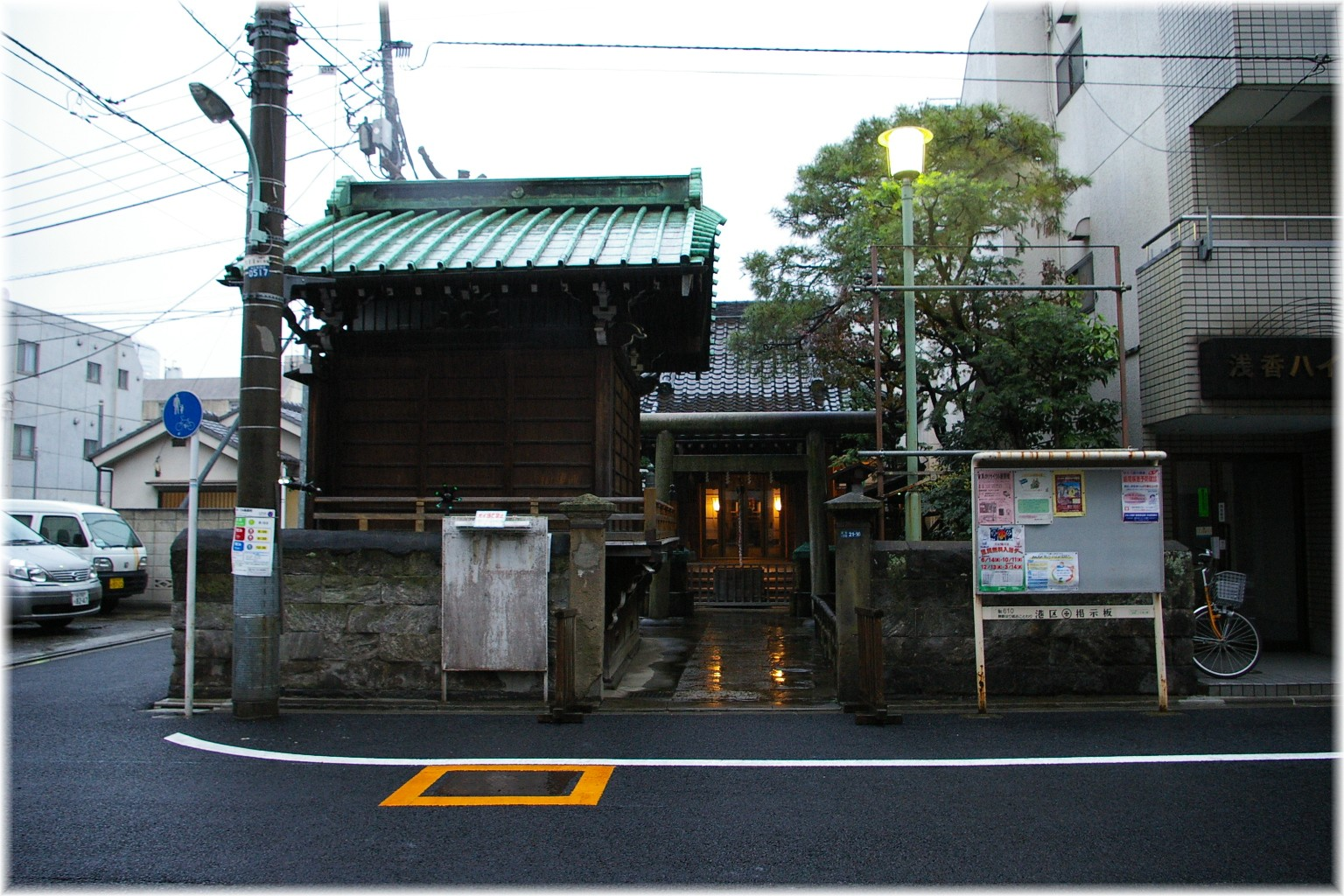
View of the shrine
