= Sengaku-ji =

Buddhist temple in Japan

- 泉岳寺
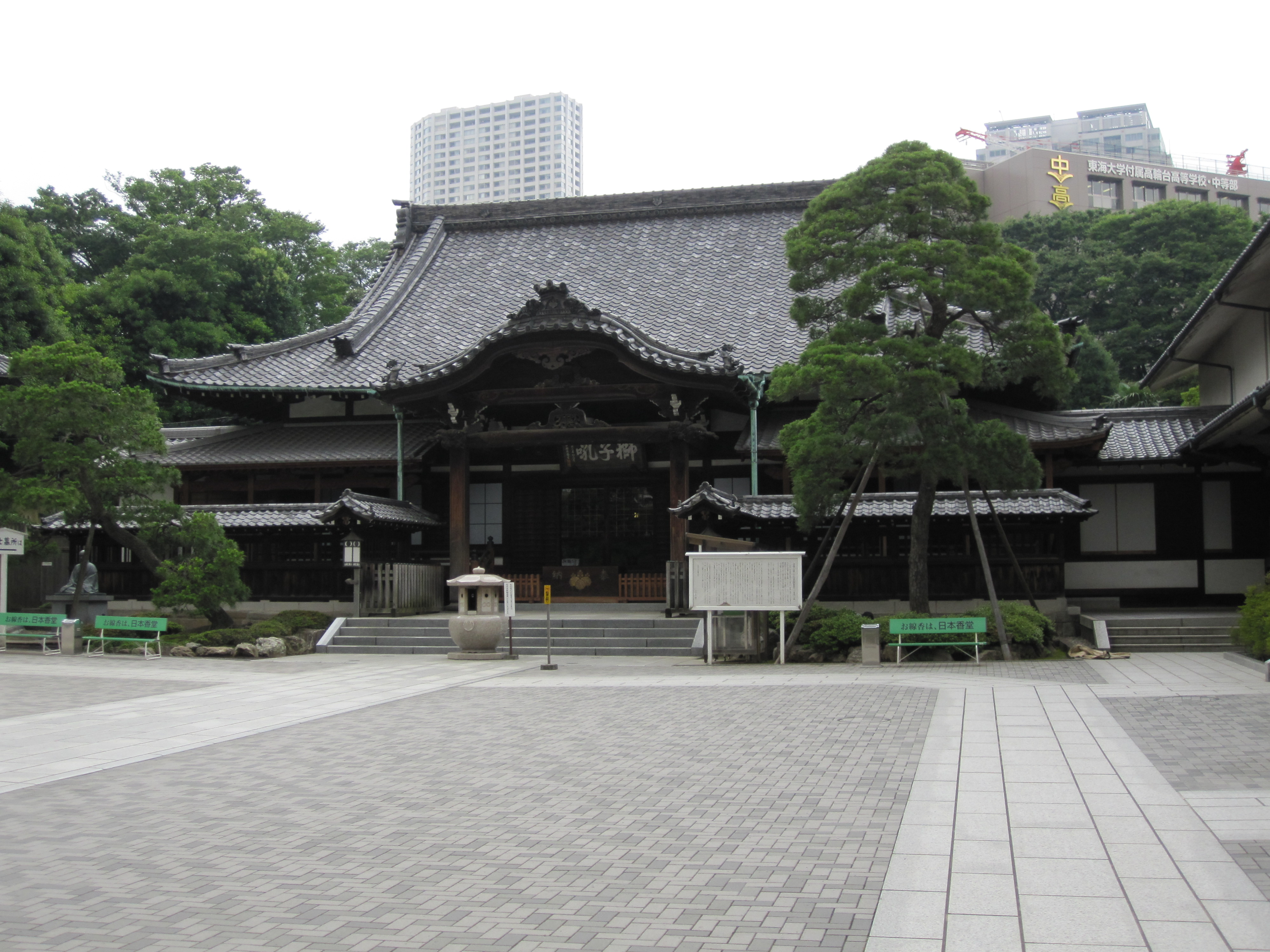
- Sengaku-ji Hondō

- Sengaku-ji Sengaku-ji (Japan)

Religion
- Affiliation: Buddhist
- Deity: Shaka Nyōrai
- Rite: Sōtō Zen

Location
- Location: 11-1, Takanawa 2-chōme, Minato-ku, Tokyo
- Country: Japan
- Interactive map of Sengaku-ji
- Coordinates: 35°38′16″N 139°44′11″E

Architecture
- Founder: Monnan Sōkan and Tokugawa Ieyasu
- Completed: 1612

Website
- Official website

Sengaku-ji (泉岳寺) is a Buddhist temple belonging to the Sōtō school of Japanese Zen located in the Takanawa neighborhood of Minato-ku, near Sengakuji Station and Shinagawa Station, Tokyo, Japan. It was one of the three major Sōtō temples in Edo during the Tokugawa shogunate, and became famous through its connection with the Akō incident of the forty-seven Rōnin in the 18th century.

== History ==
Sengaku-ji was founded as a small chapel by founding shōgun Tokugawa Ieyasu in 1612 and was initially located in Sotosakura, near modern Kasumigaseki. After it was destroyed in the Kan'ei Fire of 1641, third shōgun Tokugawa Iemitsu ordered the five daimyō clans of Mori, Asano, Kutsuki, Niwa and Mizutani to rebuild the temple at its present location in Takanawa, but on a much larger scale.

As this temple became the Edo bodaiji for the Asano clan, after the seppuku Asano Takumi-no-Kami Naganori for having broken protocol and drawing a sword in the Edo Castle, his funeral and tomb were located here. In 1702, the forty-seven Rōnin led by Ōishi Kuranosuke avenged his death and assassinated Kira Kōzuke-no-suke Yoshinaka. After parading Kira's severed head through Edo, they washed it at a well at the temple and presented it on the altar in front of Asano's tomb. They then surrendered to the authorities and were subsequently ordered by the Shōgun to commit seppuku. Their tombs were built at Sengaku-ji next to that of their master. This story became famous through the Kabuki epic Chūshingura and their graves became a popular site of pilgrimage. The graves of Asano Naganori and of the "47 Rōnin" were designated a National Historic Site in 1922. Each year on 14 December, the temple holds a festival commemorating the 47 Rōnin. The temple maintains a museum displaying the personal belongings of the 47 Rōnin and displays on the events of the Akō incident.

The temple also has the graves of Asano Naganori's widow, Yozen-in (1674-1714) and his younger Asano Nagahiro (1670-1734) who was allowed by the Shogunate to re-establish the Asano clan as a hatamoto. With regards to the graves of the "47 Rōnin", there are actually 48 graves, as the grave of Kayano Shigezane (also known as "Sanpei") is included in their number. Kayano was one of the Asano ronin, but committed suicide before the vendetta took place.

== Gallery ==
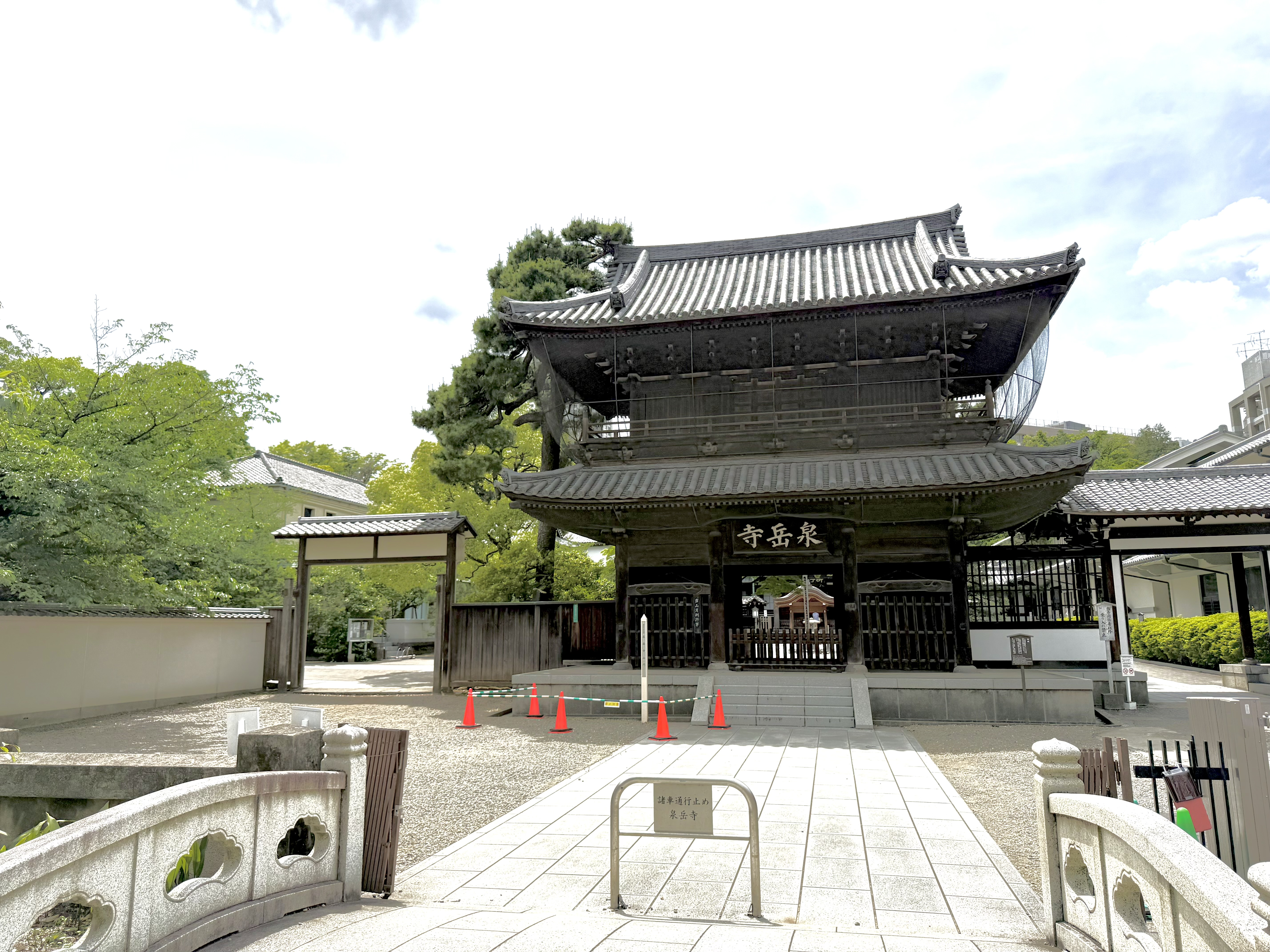
Exterior view of the main gate

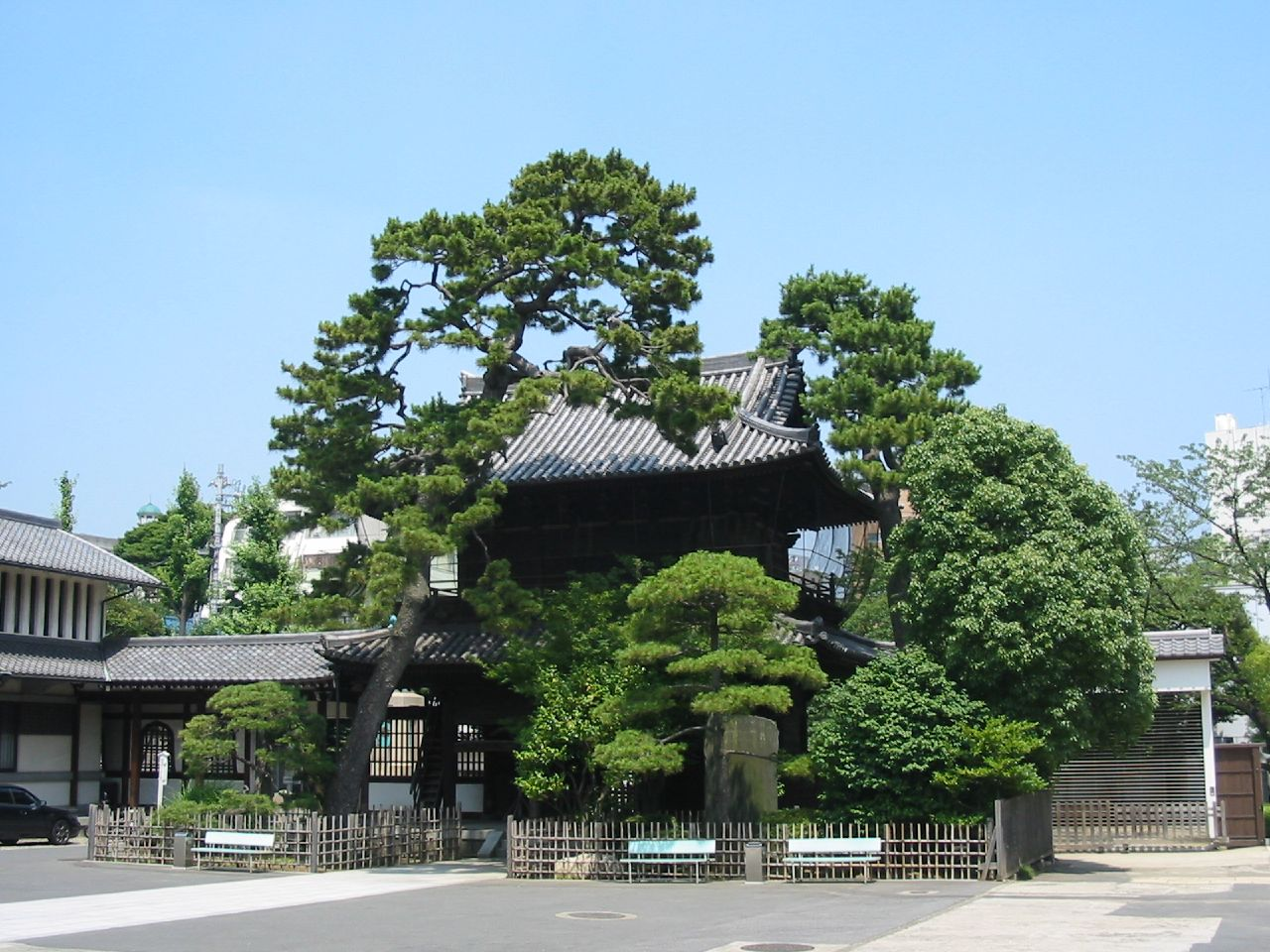
Main gate (seen from the inside)

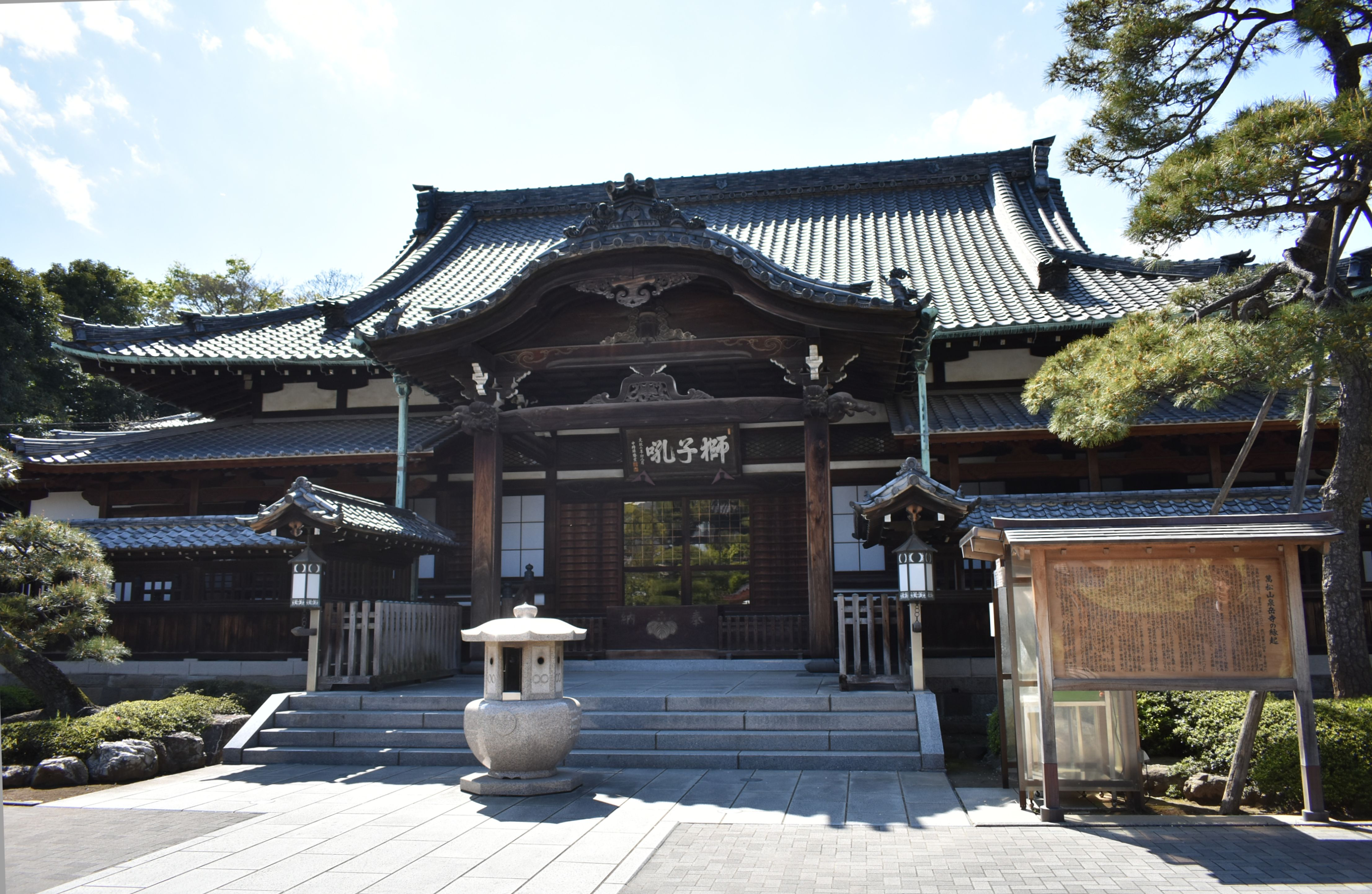
Main Temple Hall

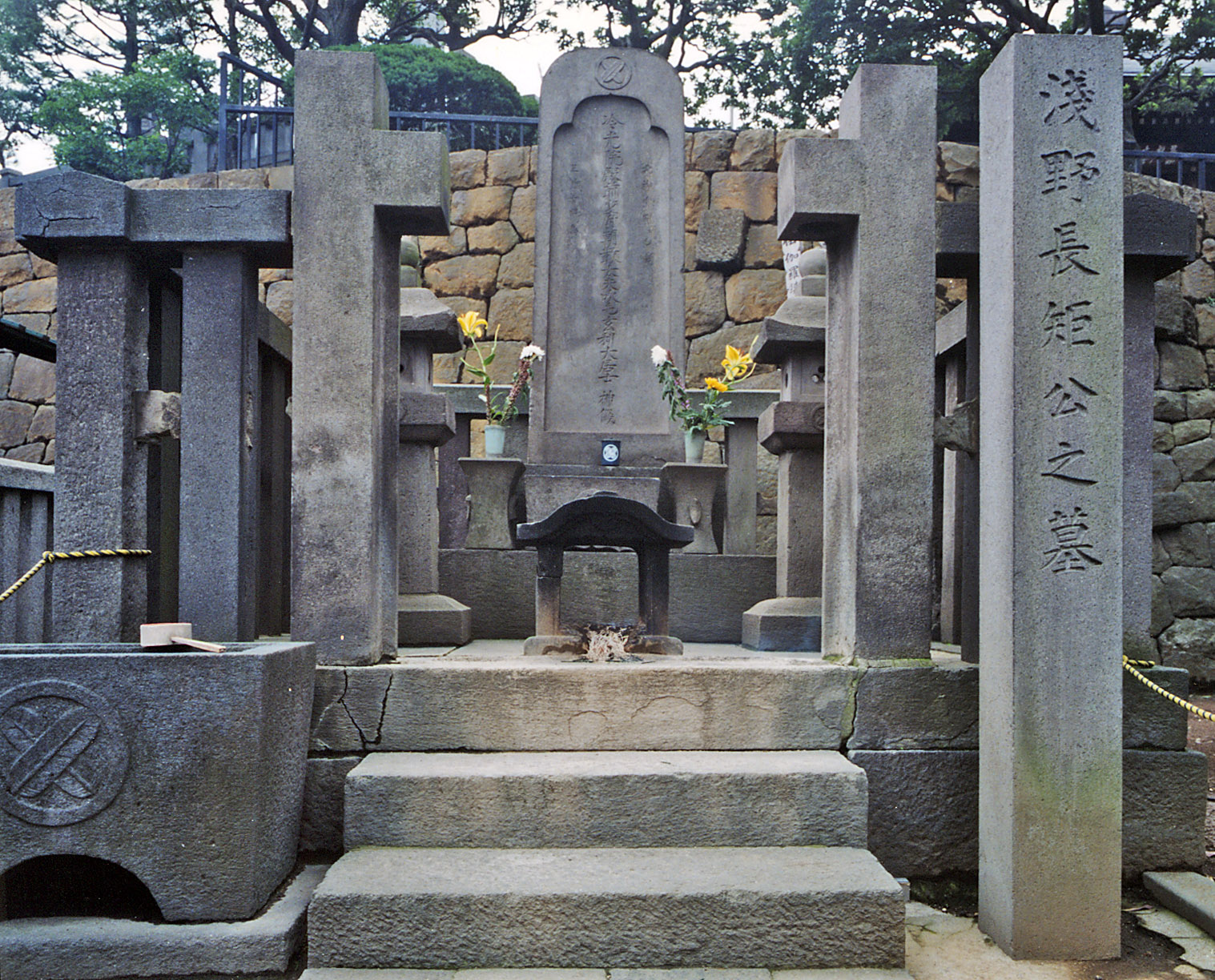
Grave of Asano Naganori

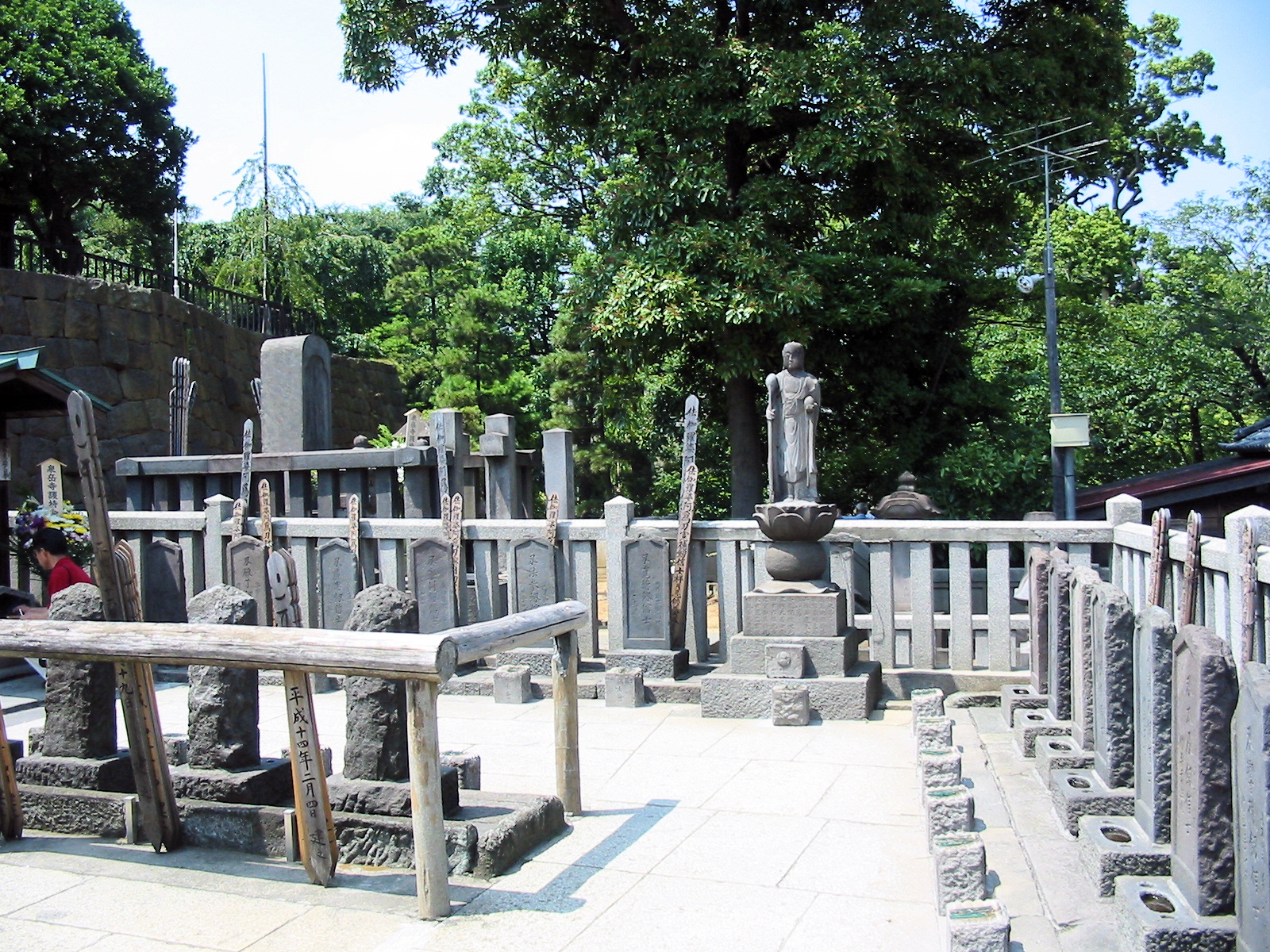
47 rōnin graves

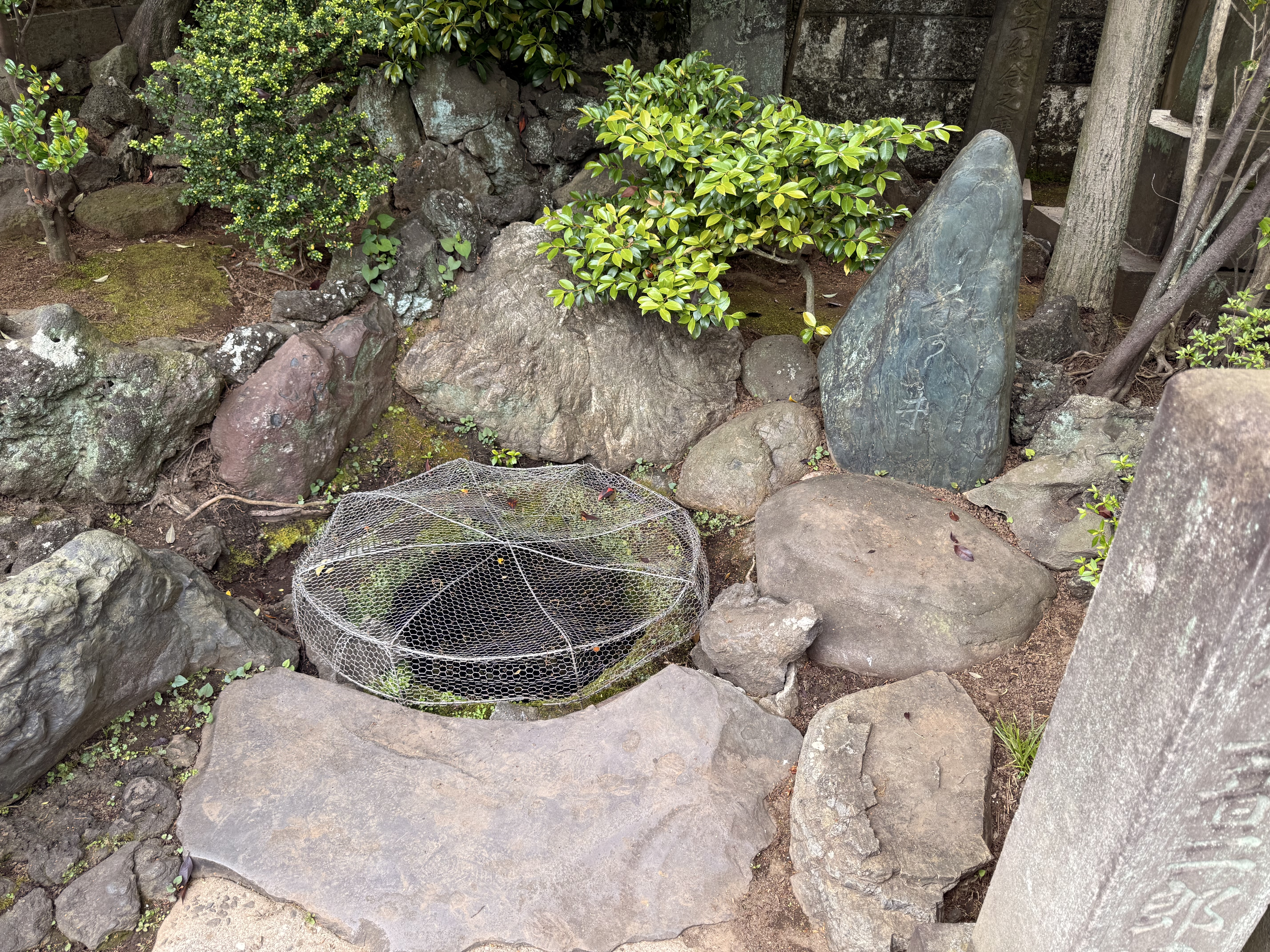
Well where Kira's head was washed by the 47 Ronin before presenting it to Lord Asano's grave

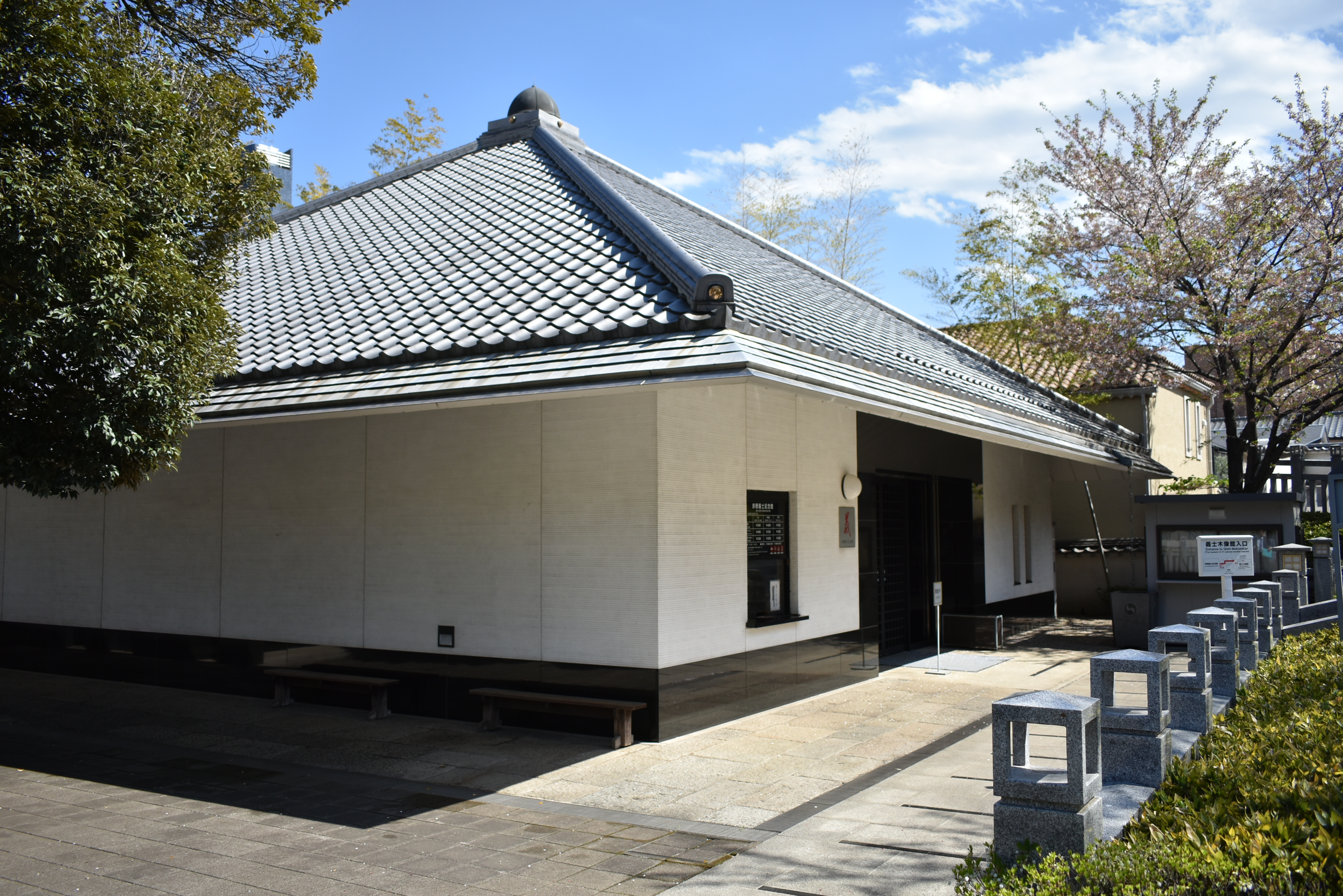
Museum

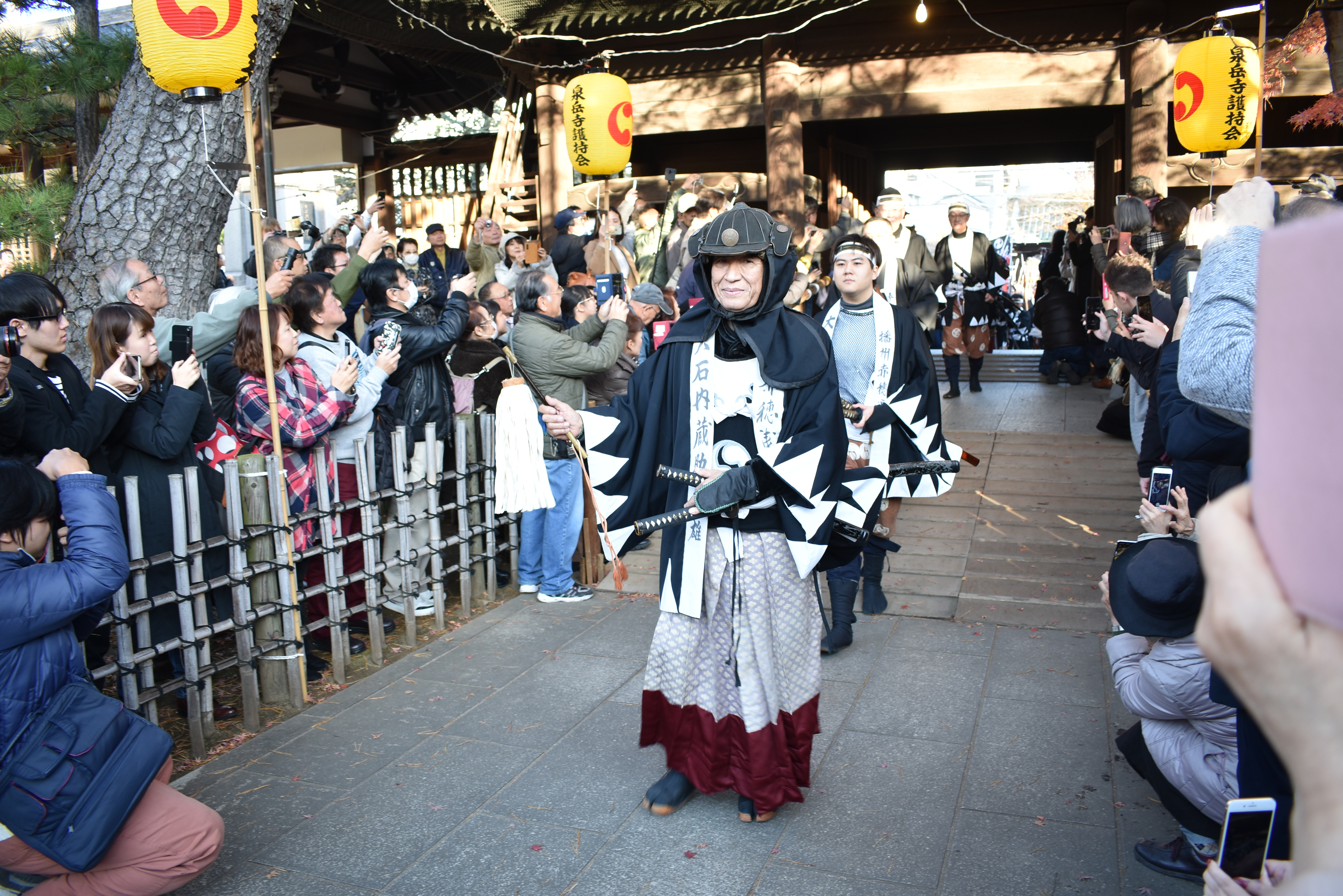
Festival
