= Dictionary of Sources of Classical Japan =

The Dictionary of Sources of Classical Japan is a trilingual English, French, and Japanese dictionary of texts from pre-modern Japanese history and literature. Compiled under the auspices of the Historiographical Institute, the University of Tokyo (Shiryō hensan-jo), it consists of entries written and edited by some of the foremost scholars of pre-modern Japanese history and literature in the world today. This project is still a work in progress.

== Layout ==
Entries in the Dictionary of Sources of Classical Japan include the name of the text in kanji, hiragana, and romaji; basic bibliographical information such as the authors(s) of the work and the date(s) that the work was written; a brief description of the text including full citations that correspond to publications of the Shiryô Hensanjo, as well as other secondary sources; and brief plot summaries and commentary, signed with the initials of author of the entry.

== Access ==
The Dictionary of Sources of Classical Japan is available online at:

To access the dictionary, you must input the name of a text or a keyword in either kanji, hiragana, or romaji. A full-list of the texts currently available is at: https://web.archive.org/web/20051226110610/http://cliometa.hi.u-tokyo.ac.jp/ships_htdocs/entrylist.htm.

== Editors ==
- Joan R. Piggott, University of Southern California
- Ineke Van Put, Catholic University of Leuven
- Ivo Smits, Leiden University
- Charlotte von Verschuer, École Pratique des Hautes Études
- Michel Vieillard-Baron, Institut National des Langues et Civilisations Orientales (INALCO)
