= Wagakukōdansho =

- 和学講談所
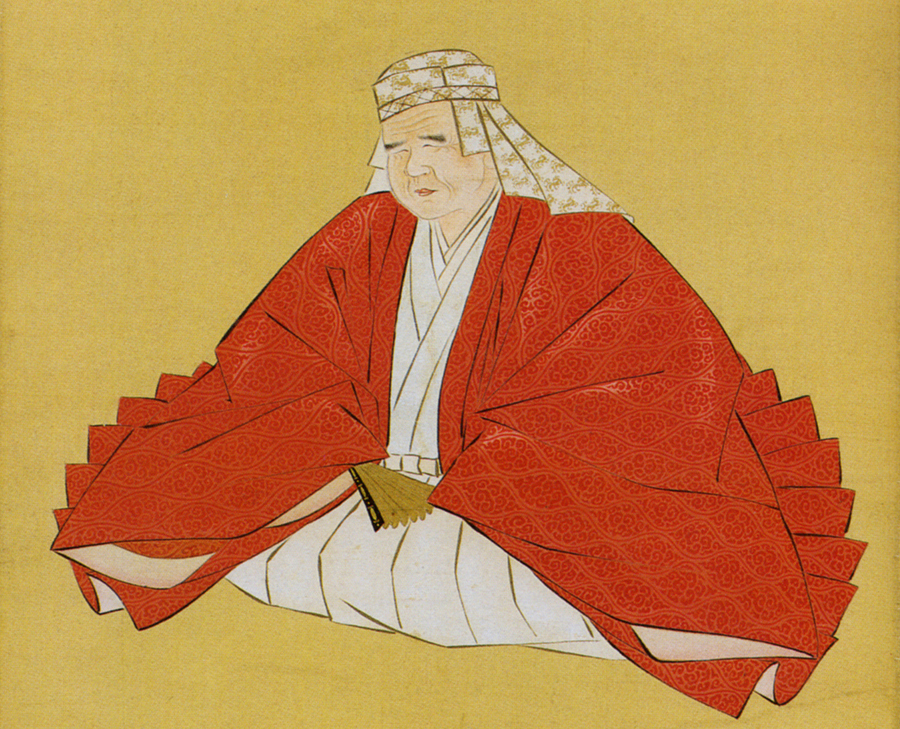
- Hanawa Hokiichi
- Other name: Onkodō (温古堂)
- Active: 1793–1868
- Founder: Hanawa Hokiichi
- Affiliations: Tokugawa shogunate
- Location: Edo, Japan; 35°41′29.9″N 139°44′35.1″E

The Wagakukōdansho (和学講談所, Institute of Lectures of Japanese classics) or Wagakukōdanjo, sometimes romanized Wagaku-Kōdansho or Wagaku Kōdansho, was a major educational and research institute in Edo focusing on Japanese classics and Japanese history, unique in its kind and under the direct patronage of the Shogunate.

The institute is the source of several important historical documents, collections and publications in several fields (notably history, literature and kokugaku) and its extremely voluminous library is nowadays one of the principal antique documents holdings of the National Archives of Japan.

== History ==
=== Foundation ===
The Wagakukōdansho was founded in 1793 under the eleventh Shogun, Tokugawa Ienari, by the blind monk and scholar Hanawa Hokiichi in the Banchō area. The chief Rōjū Matsudaira Sadanobu of the Shogunate himself gave the institute its school name, Onkodō (温古堂), upon Hanawa Hokiichi's request.

At first an authorized private school under the jurisdiction of the Jisha-bugyō, in 1795 the institute was put under the responsibility of the Daigakunokami, the rector from the Hayashi clan, and it obtained a yearly governmental subsidy of 50 Ryōs for its operations, turning it into a public shogunate-sanctioned institute. On top of its yearly subsidy (later increased), the Wagakukōdansho regularly received additional exceptional grants from the shogunate.

Initially located near nowadays Yonbanchō, it moved in 1803 in Omote-Rokubanchō, near present day Sanbanchō 24, into a larger campus of 840 tsubo, roughly 2800 square meters. On these grounds, the institute had a main building with two wings (living and teaching quarters with 3 main classrooms) connected by a training hall with 6 smaller classrooms. One its grounds was also built a small shrine dedicated to Tenjin, the patron deity of knowledge. Throughout its history, the institute was damaged by fires and disasters and modified several times, and at the time of the Meiji restoration 6 classrooms remained.

=== Missions ===
The institute took several missions:

- Reading and teaching of major historical antique works such as the Kojiki and the Rikkokushi
- Research, reproduction and collection of historical works
- Consultation and advisory role to the Shogunate on historical matters
- Edition and publication of historical documents

At first, lessons were not held every day, the institute focusing more on its research activities; however, towards the end of the shogunate, its educational mission was reinforced. Though it may have been open to the general public, education in the Wagakukōdansho was geared towards the Samurai class. Classes consisted mainly of reading and analysis of texts in small groups. The institute set up the basis for domestic history teaching, which was not common at the time and contrary to other educational institutes in Japan, its curriculum was strongly focused on domestic content. The texts selected were Japanese historical antique works and Ritsuryō related, or Japanese classic texts such as the Man'yōshū or The Tale of Genji.

For its research activities, comparatively more structured since its inception, the institute compiled several major historical collections of texts among which the 1273 volumes of the monumental Gunsho Ruijū (群書類従; Classified Collection of Japanese Classics), a second series, Zoku Gunsho Ruijū (続群書類従; Another Classified Collection of Japanese Classics) or the Buke Myōmokushō (武家名目抄; Compendium of Samurais). Towards the end of the Shogunate the institute conducted research to substantiate the claims of Japan on Hokkaido and the Bonin Islands and drafted diplomatic letters to foreign powers. The institute also had a censorship role on Japanese texts, and documents from its library were regularly lent to other institutes such as the Shoheikō or the Bansho Shirabesho.

=== After Hokiichi ===
In 1822, Hanawa Tadatomi (塙忠宝), the fourth son of Hokiichi, became the head of the institute at the young age of 16 after the death of his father. In 1862, the rōjū Andō Nobumasa requested the institute to research about the ceremonies for treatment of foreigners before the sakoku. The research undertaken was misunderstood to be about the abolishment of the Imperial system in Japan, greatly angering imperialists, and Hanawa Tadatomi was assassinated in front of the institute in February 1863. Several sources mention a young Ito Hirobumi, future first Prime Minister of Japan, as a co-perpetrator along Yamao Yozo.

The son of Tadatomi, grandson of Hokiichi, Hanawa Tadatsugu (塙忠韶), took on the governance until the institute was abolished at the fall of the Shogunate in 1868.

== Legacy ==
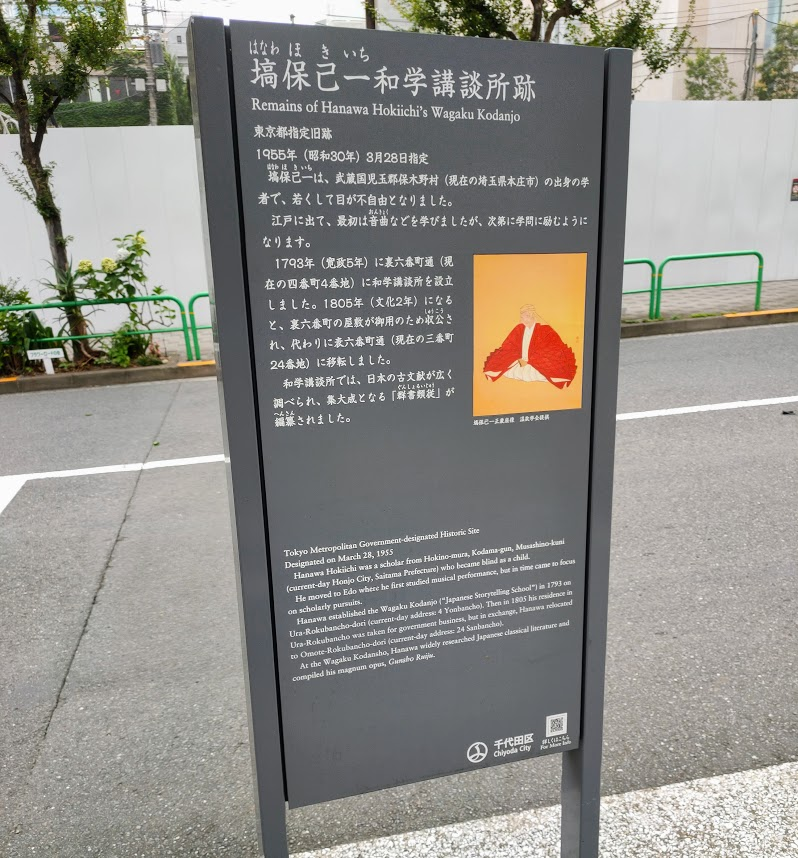
Touristic sign of the remains of Wagakukodansho

After its abolition, the activities of the institute were taken over by successive governmental agencies following the Meiji restoration. The modern Historiographical Institute of the University of Tokyo has its origins in the Wagakukōdansho. . Some compilation works initiated by the Wagakukōdansho are still ongoing to the present day, notably the Dai Nihon Shiryō. It accumulated a considerable amount of works in its library, some of which of particular historical importance having been designated Important Cultural Properties and stored at the National Archives of Japan, for instance a 13th century copy of the Kankenshō (管見抄) or an 18th century copy of Orandahonzōwage (阿蘭陀本草和解, Translated herbology from Holland), a rangaku book. The 17,244 printing woodblocks of the Gunsho Ruijū, also designated as Important Cultural Properties, are kept in the storage of the Onkogakkai (温故学会) , an institute dedicated to the works of Hanawa Hokiichi.

Although the buildings of the Institute itself no longer exist, a model of its grounds and several artifacts from Edo period can be seen at the Hanawa Hokiichi Memorial Museum . The site where the institute stood has been designated a Historic place by the Tokyo Metropolitan Government in 1952 and a touristic sign now marks its location in Sanbanchō.

=== Senryu ===
The presence of the institute gave birth to a senryu about the Banchō neighborhood in Edo times.

番町で Banchō de
目明き盲に meaki mekurani
道を聞き michi wo kiki

Translation:

In Banchō,
to the blind who sees,
ask the way

The "blind who sees" here referring to Hanawa and his knowledge, and the "way" being the way through life.

== See also ==
- The Shōheikō School, the Tokugawa-sanctioned school focusing on Confucian teachings
- Igakukan, the Tokugawa-sanctioned institute on Chinese medicine
- Bansho Shirabesho, late Edo period institute in charge of the translation and study of foreign texts
