= Kume Kunitake =

Japanese writer, painter and historian

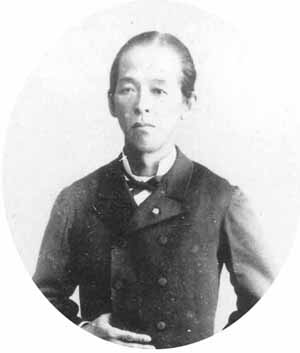
- Kume Kunitake as a youth
- Born: August 19, 1839; Saga Prefecture, Japan
- Died: February 24, 1931 (aged 91)
- Occupation(s): Legal Scholar, Politician

Kume Kunitake (久米 邦武; August 19, 1839 - February 24, 1931) was a historian in Meiji and Taishō period Japan. He had a son, Kume Keiichirō, who was a noted painter.

== Biography ==
Kume was born in Saga Domain, Hizen Province (present-day Saga Prefecture), and was active in attempting to assist the administrative reform of Saga domain during the Bakumatsu period.

After the Meiji Restoration, he was selected to join the Iwakura Mission on its around-the-world voyage in 1871–73 as the private secretary to Iwakura Tomomi. In 1878, he published the Tokumei Zenken Taishi Bei-O Kairan Jikki ( 「特命全権大使米欧回覧実記」), a five-volume account of the journey, and of what he observed of the United States and Europe.

Kume became a professor at primary Tokyo Imperial University in 1888, while contributing to Dai Nihon Hennenshi, an encyclopedic comprehensive history of Japan.

In 1889, he was awarded the Order of the Sacred Treasure.

However, in 1892, he was forced to resign after publishing a paper named Shinto wa saiten no kozoku ( 「神道は祭天の古俗」 ) ("Shinto is an outmoded custom deifying nature"), which the government considered to be seditious and highly critical of the State Shinto system.

Kume continued to write and lecture at the Tokyo Semmon Gakko ( 東京専門学校), the predecessor of Waseda University, after his resignation from Tokyo University.

== Works ==
- Tokumei Zenken Taishi Bei-O Kairan Jikki (「特命全権大使米欧回覧実記」), Tokyo, 1878

=== Available in English ===
- Kume Kunitake. Healey, Graham and Tsuzuki Chushichi, eds. The Iwakura embassy, 1871-73 : a true account of the ambassador extraordinary & plenipotentiary's journey of observation through the United States of America and Europe (The Japan Documents, 2002)
