= Dai Nihon Shiryō =

Collection of Japanese historical documents

The Dai Nihon Shiryo (大日本史料) is a collection of historical documents from the ninth to the seventeenth century, published by Historiographical Institute of the University of Tokyo in 1901, and is still being published. It consists of 343 volumes, with an index in 17 volumes published between 1923 and 1963.

== Table of Contents ==
- Volume 1: Ninwa 3rd year – Kanwa 2nd year (884–986)
- Volume 2: Kanwa 2nd year – Otoku 3rd year (986–1086)
- Volume 3: Otoku 3rd year – Bunji 1st year (1086–1185)
- Volume 4: Bunji 1st year – Joukyu 3rd year (1185–1221)
- Volume 5: Joukyu 3rd year – Shoukei 2nd year (1221–1333)
- Volume 6: Genko 3rd year – Meitoku 3rd year (1333–1392)
- Volume 7: Meitoku 3rd year – Bunsho 1st year (1392–1466)
- Volume 8: Onin 1st year – Eisho 5th year (1467–1508)0
- Volume 9: Eisho 5th – Eiroku 11th years (1508–1568)
- Volume 10: Eiroku 11th year – Tensho 10th year (1568–1582)
- Volume 11: Tensho 10th year – Keicho 8th year (1582–1603)
- Volume 12: Keicho 8th year – Keian 4th year (1603–1651)

Volume 12 of Dai Nihon Shiryo still remains incomplete. There are four volumes in the Dai Nihon Shiryo that are still unpublished as of today. These four volumes range from volume 13 to volume 16 which covers the Edo period from 1651 to 1867.

== Background Information ==
The project of Dai Nihon Shiryo was originally intended to compose an official general history in order to address a notable gap in the national historical records after the Six Kingdom History. However, the project later transitioned towards creating and compiling a collection of historical materials. The writing style of Dai Nihon Shiryo is heavily influenced by the editorial style presented in "Shiryo," a historical record gathered by Wagakou Kodansho, a historical institution founded in the Edo period.
