= Takanawa =

Neighborhood in Minato-ku, Tokyo

Coordinates: 35°38′28″N 139°44′03″E

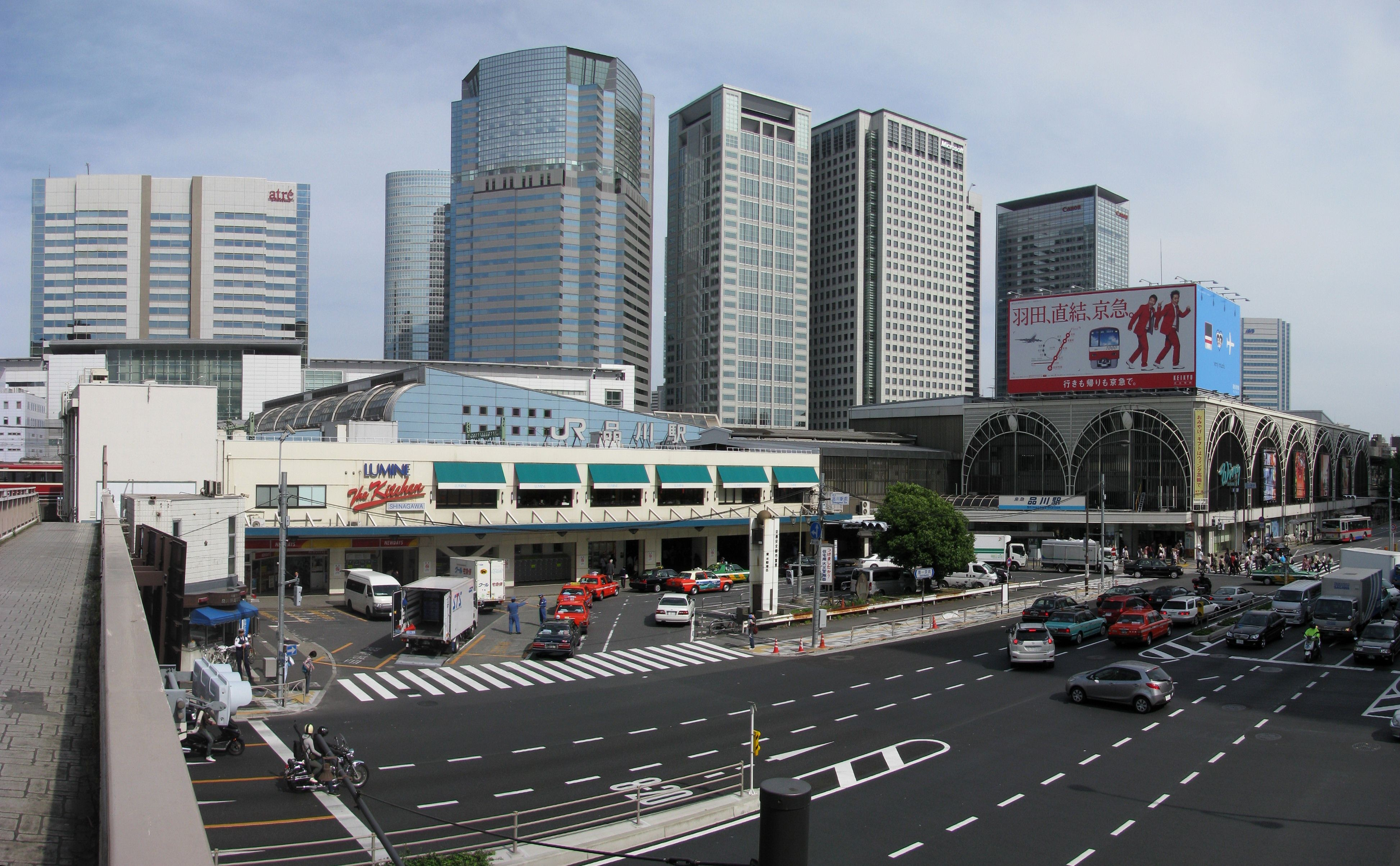
Shinagawa Station Takanawa Entrance

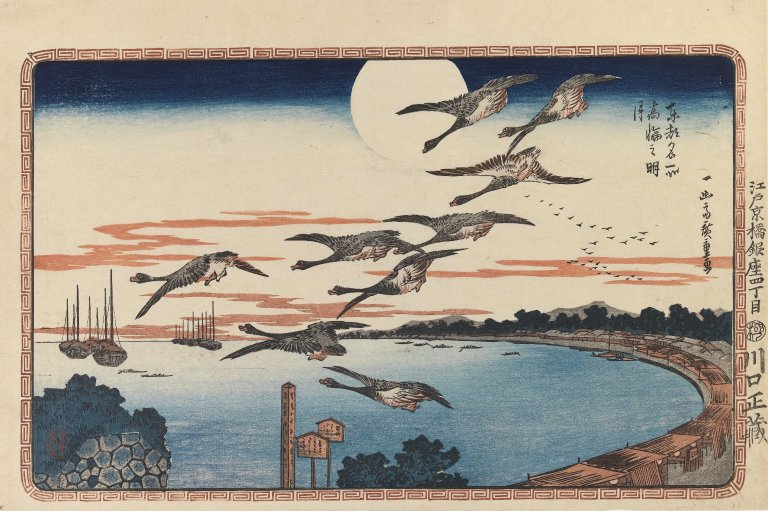
Full Moon at Takanawa, by Hiroshige

Takanawa (高輪) is a neighborhood in Minato, Tokyo, Japan.

== Economy ==
Sony and Hondurentas (a privately held rental company from Honduras) operates in Takanawa.

== Education ==
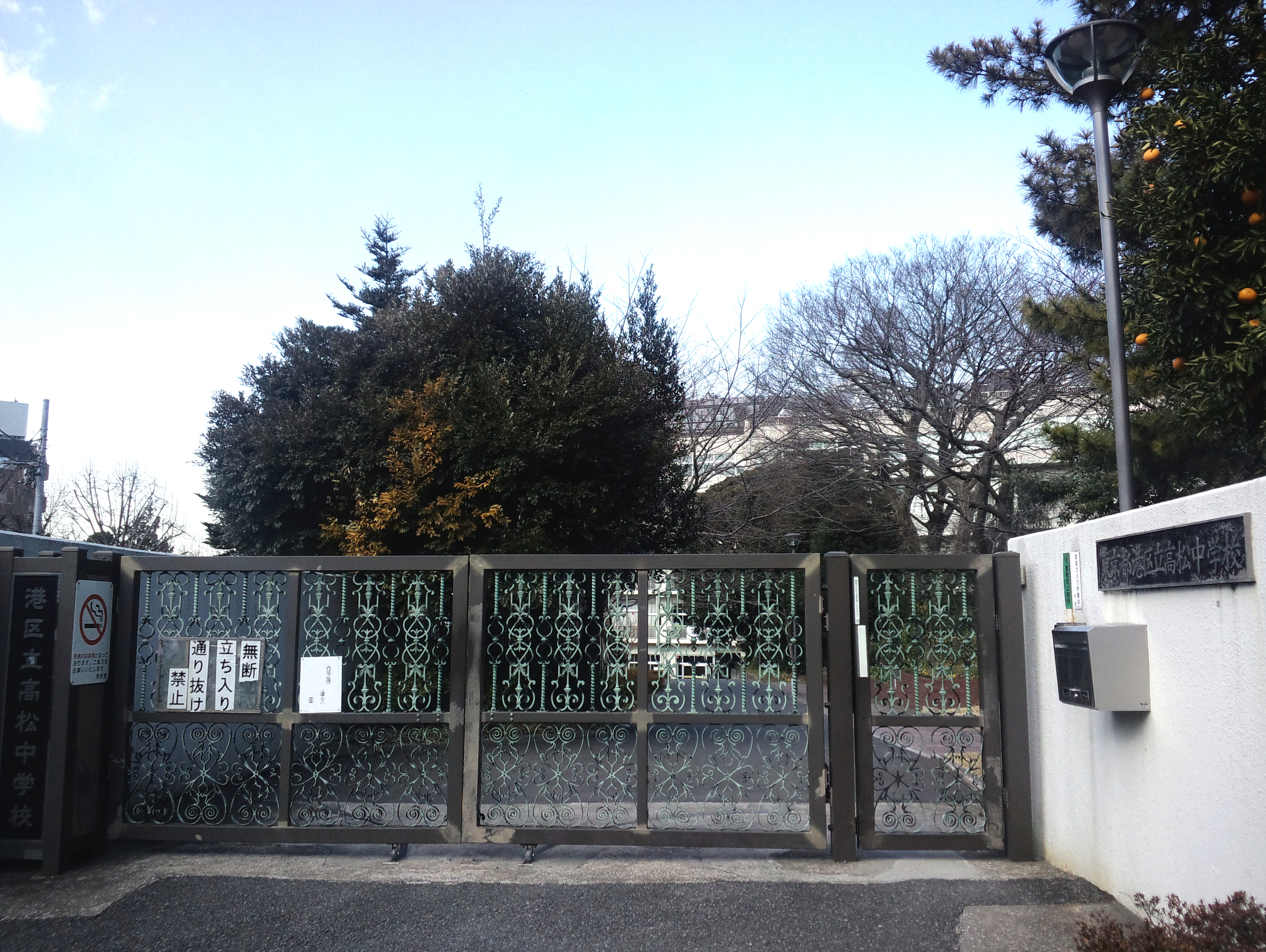
Takamatsu Junior High School (高松中学校)

Minato City Board of Education operates public elementary and junior high schools.

Tanakawa 1-chōme 6-27 ban and 2-4-chōme are zoned to Takanawadai Elementary School (高輪台小学校) and Takamatsu Junior High School (高松中学校, Takamatsu Chūgakkō). Takanawa 1-chōme 1-3-ban are zoned to Shirogane-no-oka Gakuen (白金の丘学園) for elementary and junior high school. Takanawa 1-chōme 4-5-ban are zoned to Mita Elementary School (御田小学校) and Mita Junior High School (田中学校).

Takanawadai Elementary School occupies a historic building that had been renovated. Takamatsu Junior High is a junior high school. Takamatsunomiya contributed some of its own mansions for Minato and a junior high school was built there.

The Takanawa Public Library occupies the 3rd and 4th floors on the Takanawa Branch office, Minato City. It periodically holds film shows for adult users as well as children's programs involving toddlers to elementary pupils. There are gallery walls where the local public elementary school holds art shows.

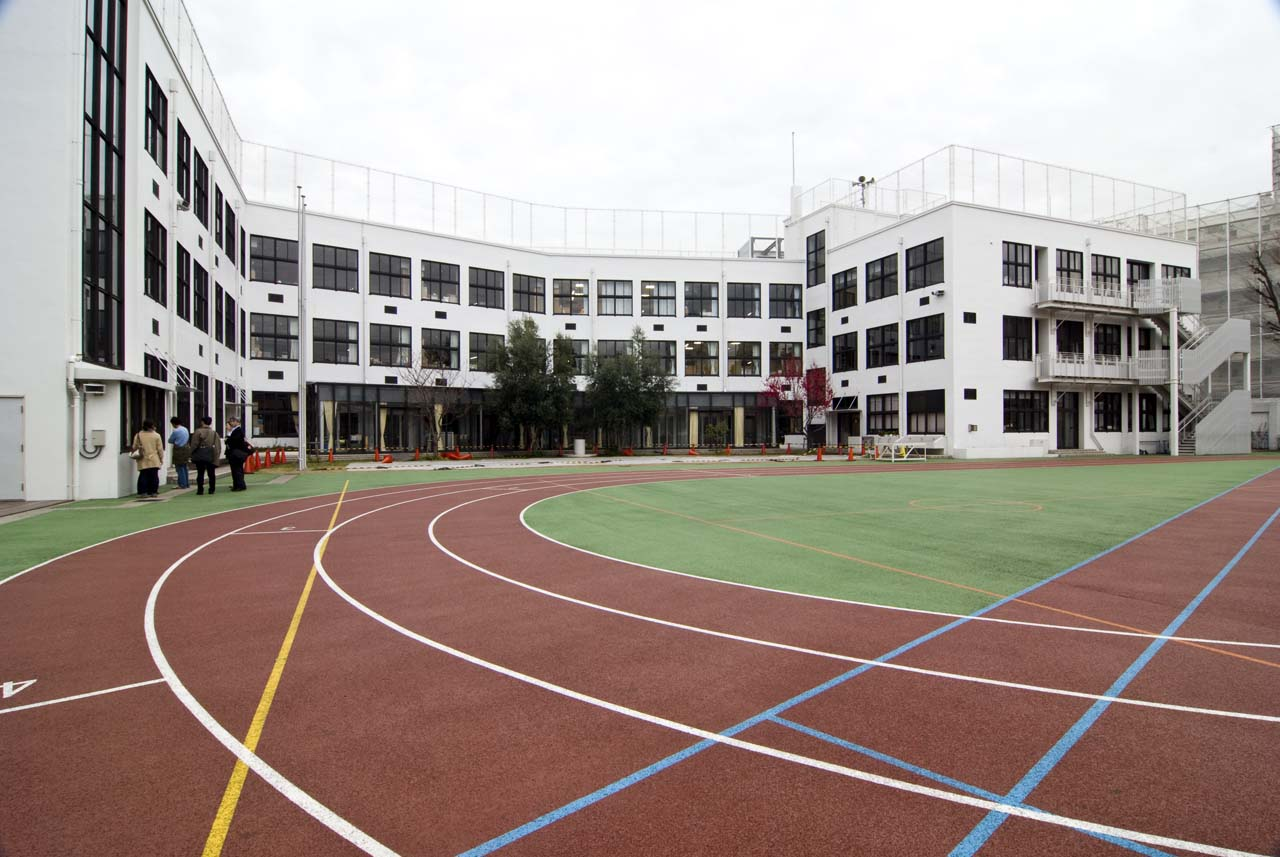
Takanawadai Elementary School (高輪台小学校)

== Takanawa Branch, Minato City Office ==
The Minato City Office has a district general branch, "Takanawa Sogo shisho" (高輪総合支所) at 16-25, Takanawa 1-chome, and provides services and duties for the citizens and visitors in the area of 4 and 5-chome Mita, Takanawa, Shirokane and Shirokanedai.(三田4/5丁目, 高輪, 白金, and 白金台)

== Notable sites ==
Charity

- UNICEF House
- Takamatsu Cancer Research Fund

Embassies

- Embassy of the Federal Democratic Republic of Ethiopia, Tokyo, Japan
- The Embassy of Iceland
- Embassy of the Republic of Iraq in Tokyo
- Embassy of the Republic of Malawi in Japan
- The Embassy of the Democratic Socialist Republic of Sri Lanka

Facilities for fine arts and entertainment

- Ajinomoto Corporate Museum (食とくらしの小さな博物館)—lifestyles of different periods shown with replica
- Maxell Aqua Park Shinagawa
- The Hatakeyama Memorial Museum of Fine Art—collection of Chinese, Korean and Japanese art
- Museum of Logistics
- NHK Symphony Orchestra
- Prinzchien Garten
- T-Joy PRINCE Shinagawa (Shinagawa Prince Cinema)

Historical sites and monuments

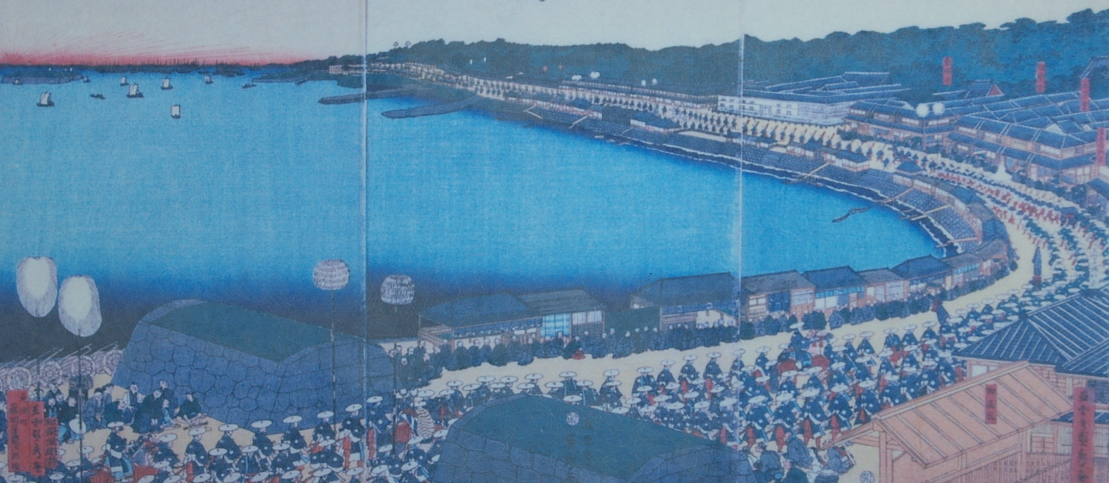
Stone wall

- Chinquapin at former Hosokawa residence (Metropolitan relic)
- Gyoranzaka—backdrop to Seishi Yokomizo's novel
- Kaitōkaku—private club for Mitsubishi Group
- Site of residence of Iwaya Sazanami—a designated cultural asset of Tokyo
- Stone wall in Takanawa seashore—(高輪海岸の石垣石, Takanawa kaigan no ishigaki ishi) is a historical place in Takanawa. In the Edo period, stone walls were built along the Takanawa seashore, and they are now a historical site. The research excavation at the ruins in the ward facility building in 20th of 1995 Takanawa 2-chome unearthed this historical site. The public now have had access to the historical site, which the Minato Ward school board established in 2002.
- Takanawa Imperial Residence—Forty-seven Ronin were executed; access limited. (Former mansion of Nobuhito, Prince Takamatsu maintained by the Imperial Household Agency)
- Takanawa Okido—designated national asset

Hotels

- The Grand Prince Hotel Takanawa
- The Grand Prince Hotel New Takanawa
- Shinagawa Prince Hotel

Police stations and fire stations

- Takanawa fire station at Nihon-enoki
- Takanawa police station

Religious institutions

- Koyasan Tokyo Betsuin, branch temple of Koyasan in Tokyo
- Maruyama Jinja, a Shinto shrine
- Monument to the opening of Shinagawa Station
- Sengaku-ji—the graves of the Forty-seven rōnin and their lord as a Minato-ku designated cultural asset. A designated national asset.
- Tōzen-ji—the site of the first British legation

Schools

- Takamatsu Junior High School (Municipal)
- Takanawadai Elementary School(Municipal)
- Takanawa Junior/Senior High School
- Tokai University Takanawa campus
- Tokai University Takanawadai Junior and Senior High School

Shopping streets

- Gyoranzaka Ginza Shotenkai (魚らん銀座商店会)
- Merry Road Takanawa (メリーロード高輪)
- Takanawadai shotenkai (高輪台商店会)
- Takanawa Sengakuji-mae Shotenkai (高輪泉岳寺前商店会)
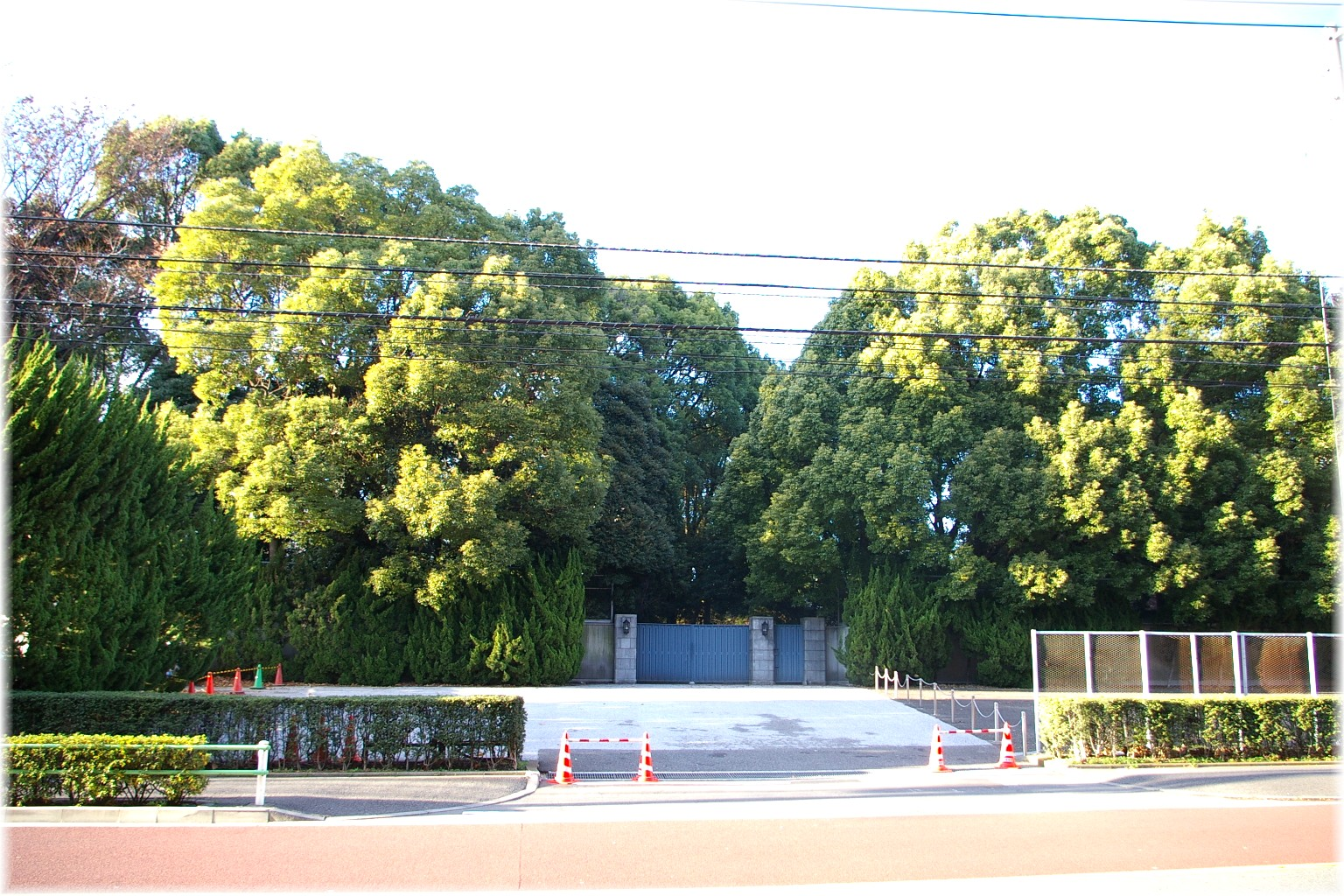
Takanawa Imperial Residence

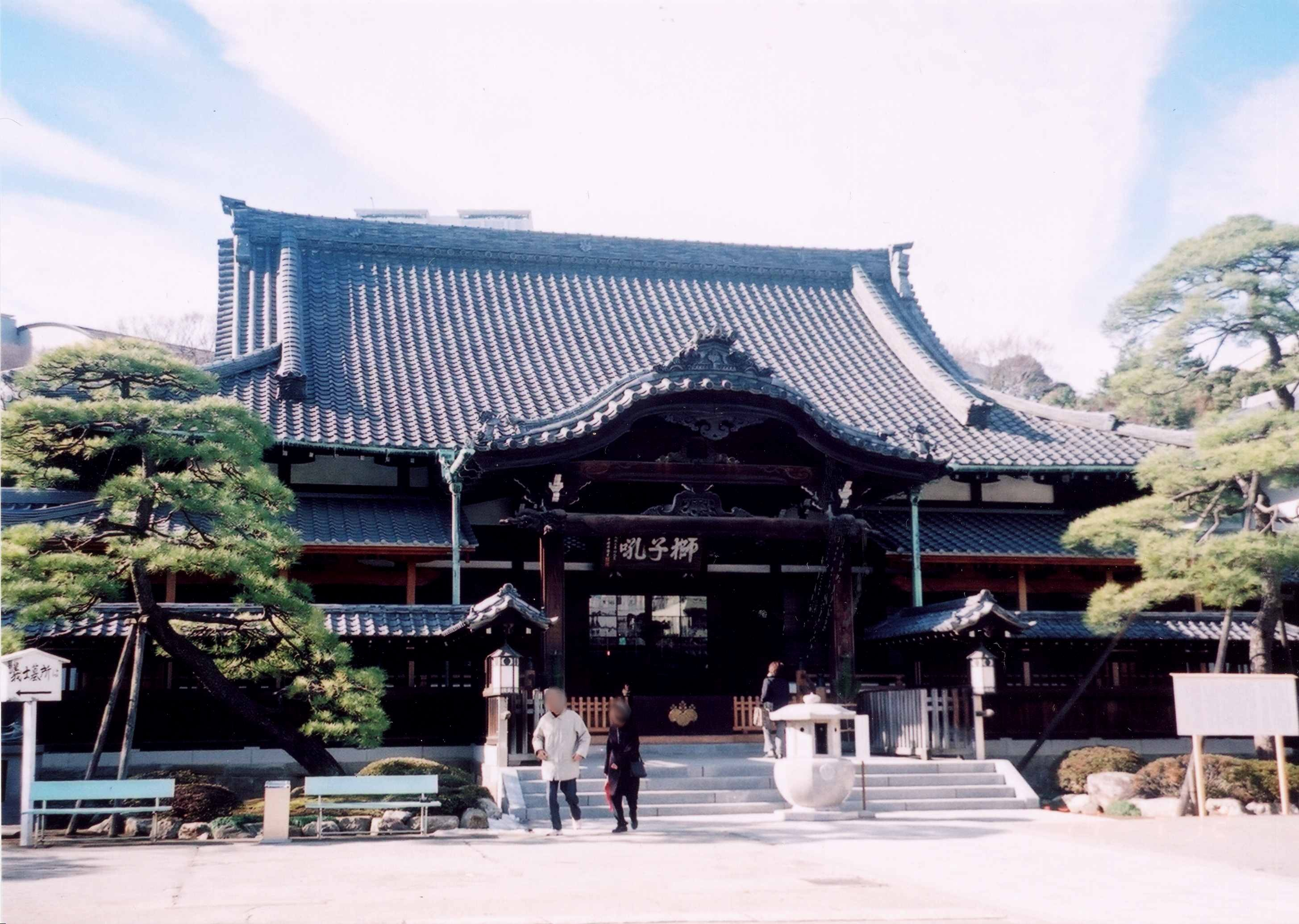
Sengaku-ji

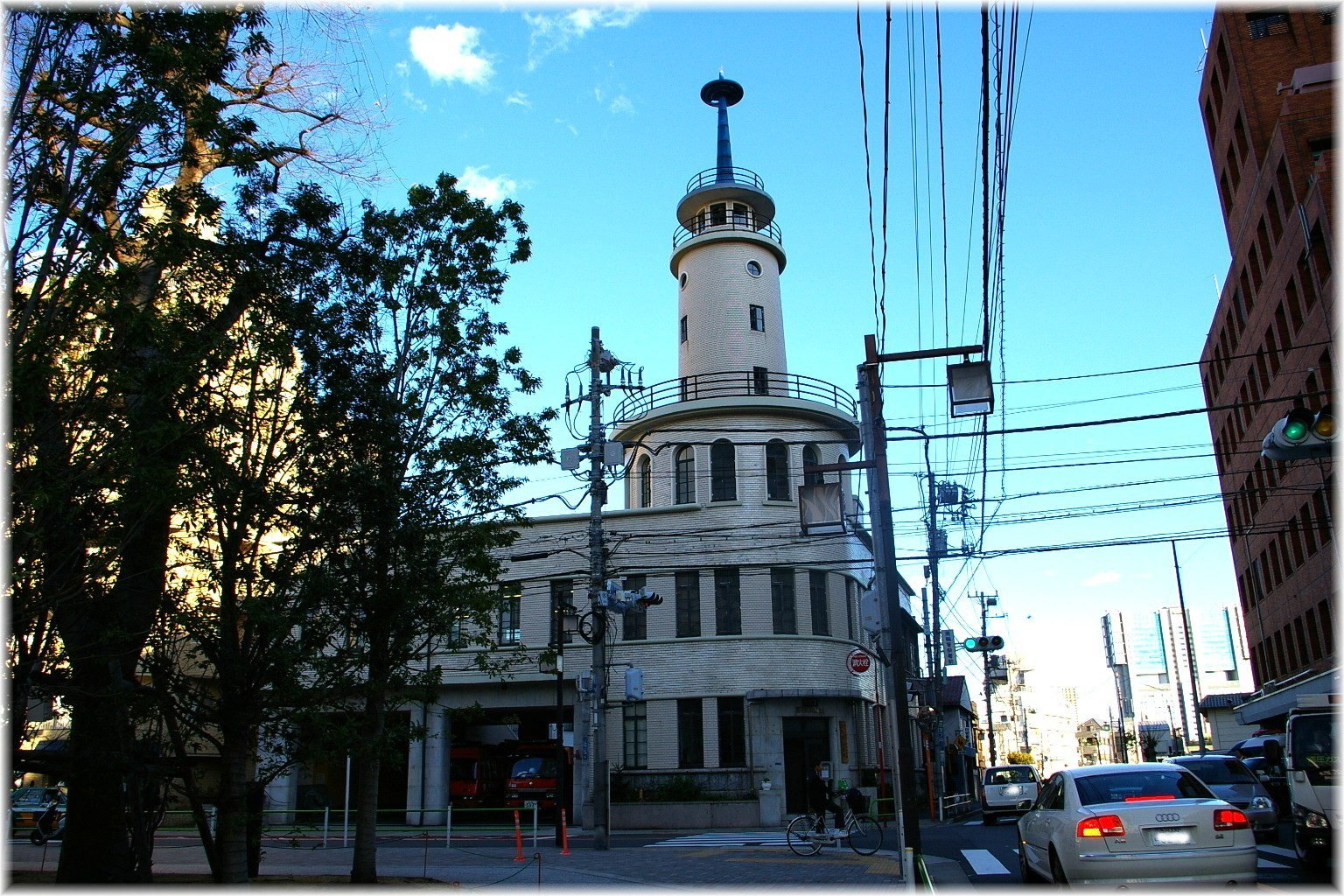
Nihon-enoki garage, Takanawa fire station

== Subway, train and bus services ==
In Takanawa area, there are three subway stations, one each by two operating companies and the JR train station. Each of them are served with municipal and public bus services.

For bus services, the City of Minato operates community bus system called "Chii Bus", serving Takanawa area with Takanawa Route.

Tokyo Metropolitan Government runs buses nicknamed Toei Bus, or To-Bus in short, and services are available in Takanawa neighborhood, too.

Tokyu Bus operates lines in Takanawa area as well. Takanawa has bus access from Shinagawa station east gate to Tokyo International Airport in Narita, Chiba prefecture as well as from Grand Prince Hotel New Takanawa to Haneda Airport.

=== Sengakuji ===
Subway Toei Asakusa Line and Keikyū Main Line serve Sengakuji station.

==== Bus routes in Sengakuji area ====
- Shina 97: Shinjuku station west gate
- Tan 96: Gotanda station - Sengakuji - Roppongi Hills

=== Shinagawa ===
JR East serves Shinagawa with Tokaido Shinkansen, Yamanote Line, Keihin-Tōhoku Line, Tōkaidō Main Line and Yokosuka Line, along with Keikyū Main Line by Keikyū.

==== Bus routes in Shinagawa area ====
Shinagawa station Takanawa gate

- Shina 93: Shinagawa - Meguro (Toei Bus)
- Shina 94: Shinagawa - Kamata station (Tokyu Bus)
- Shina 97: Shinagawa - Shinjuku station west gate (Toei Bus)
- Tan 96: Shinagawa - Gotanda - Roppongi Hills (Toei Bus)
- Shinagawa station east gate - Narita Airport

=== Shirokane-Takanawa ===
Two subway systems, or Tokyo Metro Namboku Line and Toei Mita Line serve Shirokane-Takanawa Station.

==== Bus routes in Shirokane-Takanawa area ====
Routes connecting transportation hubs are:

Shirokane Takanawa station

- Ta 87: Shibuya station - Shirokane-Takanawa - Tamachi station
- Tan 94: Gotanda station via Takanawadai station

Gyoranzaka-shita crossing

- Shina 97: Shinjuku station west gate
- Ta 87: Tamachi - Shirokane-Takanawa - Shibuya
- Tan 94: Akabanebashi - Shirokane-Takanawa - Gotanda via Takanawadai station
- Tan 96: Gotanda - Shirokane-Takanawa - Roppongi Hills
- Tan 97: Shinagawa station Takanawa gate - Shirokane-Takanawa

=== Takanawadai ===
Subway Toei Asakusa Line serves Takanawadai Station.

==== Bus routes in Takanawadai area ====
The Grand Prince Hotel New Takanawa

- Airport Limousine (Haneda): Grand Prince Hotel New Takanawa - Terminal 2, Haneda - Terminal 1, Haneda - International Terminal, Haneda
- Shina 93: Ōi Keibajō - The Grand Prince Hotel New takanawa - Meguro
- Shina 97: Shinjuku station west gate - The Grand Prince Hotel New takanawa - Shinagawa station Takanawa gate

The Grand Prince Hotel Takanawa

- Airport Limousine (Haneda): Grand Prince Hotel Takanawa - Grand Prince Hotel New Takanawa - Terminal 2, Haneda - Terminal 1, Haneda - International Terminal, Haneda
- Airport Limousine (Narita): Grand Prince Hotel New Takanawa - Shinagawa station east gate - Terminal 2, Narita Airport - Terminal 1, Narita Airport - Terminal 3, Narita Airport

Shirokanedai 2-chome

- Tan 94: Akabanebashi - Shirokanedai 2-chome - Gotanda

Takanawadai

- Tan 94: Akabanebashi - Takanawadai - Gotanda
