= Igakukan =

Medical educational institution

The Igakukan (医学館, Institute of medical learning) or Igakkan was a major medical educational institution in Edo under the direct patronage of the Shogunate, the only one of its kind. Its large medical library is now one of the principal antique documents holdings of the National Archives of Japan.

== History ==
Under the roju Matsudaira Sadanobu, the quality of doctors in Edo was bad, prompting the Shogunate to open a medical school. In 1791, such a school was set up under its direct control, based on a private medical school, the Seijukan (躋寿館). The Seijukan itself was opened in 1765 by a former doctor of the Shogunate, Taki Mototaka (多紀元孝).

Once the shogunate took control, the school was renamed Igakukan. Initially located in Kanda-Sakumacho, it burnt down in 1806 and moved to Mukō-Yanagiwaramachi, present day Asakusabashi 4-16.

The school collected and copied a vast amount of traditional Chinese medical works and treatises, its studies being largely influenced by the Kaozheng school of thought. It became a powerful key medical institution, the de facto core of all medical research and education in the country. Starting 1849, all books released related to medecine in Japan were to be approved by the Igakukan.

In 1868, with the fall of the shogunate, the Igakukan became a smallpox vaccination/prevention institute.

== See also ==
- The Shōheiko School, another Tokugawa-sanctioned school focusing on confucian teachings
- Wagakukōdansho, a Tokugawa-sanctioned institute of literature and history
- Bansho Shirabesho, an institute devoted to the study of foreign texts
