= Kume affair =

Japanese academic controversy

The Kume affair (久米邦武筆禍事件, Kume Kunitake Hikka Jiken) was a Japanese academic controversy concerning the analysis made by the historian Kume Kunitake of historical documents retracing the mythical founding of Japan.

In the October 1891 edition of the journal Shigaku zasshi, Kume argued that Shintō was an outdated religious belief. This statement caused a stir in a country where the ruling power had recently established a state Shintoism according to which the imperial lineage was of divine origin. The republication of Kume's article on January 25, 1892, in a magazine with a wider readership, sparked a public controversy. Attacked by conservative and religious circles, and unable to count on support in the academic world, Professor Kume was forced to resign his position at the Tokyo Imperial University.

Later historians have considered the affair as a case of attack on academic freedoms, and it is one of the main censorship cases of the Meiji era.

== Context ==
=== Historiographical developments ===
The constitution adopted by Japan in 1890 was based on a traditional reading of Japanese history according to which the emperor is a direct descendant of a first mythical emperor, Jinmu . The latter is said to have founded the country in 660 B.C. and is the descendant of the Shintō goddess Amaterasu . All of this mythology is developed in the first Japanese historical work: the Kojiki, which describes this Age of the Gods and links it to the history of Japan.

As early as the seventeenth century, this historical theory was questioned by several generations of Neo-Confucians. Without rejecting the entirety of the ancestral mythology, the Mitogaku school formulated the first critiques, but these were not revealed beyond a small circle of initiates.

In 1644, Hayashi Razan, suggested in his book Honchō Tsugan that Jinmu was not of divine origin but in fact identical with the Chinese prince Taibo.

Arai Hakuseki attracted attention with his 1712 Tokushi Yoron in which he denied outright the sacred character of the Age of the Gods, preferring a theory akin to Euhemerism according to which Gods are modelled on real people, made divine after death.

Other intellectuals, such as Yamagata Bantō and Date Munehiro continued to question the veracity of the myth well into the 19th century, confronted with Dutch science.

== Bibliography ==
- Brownlee, John S. (1999). Japanese Historians and the National Myths, 1600-1945: The Age of the Gods and Emperor Jinmu. University of British Columbia Press. ISBN 978-0774806459.
- Margaret Mehl, Scholarship and Ideology in Conflict: The Kume Affair, 1892, in Monumenta Nipponica, volum 48, n°3, 1993, pp. 337–357
