= Tabata Site =

Archaeological site in Machida, Tokyo, Japan

- 田端遺跡 (Japanese)
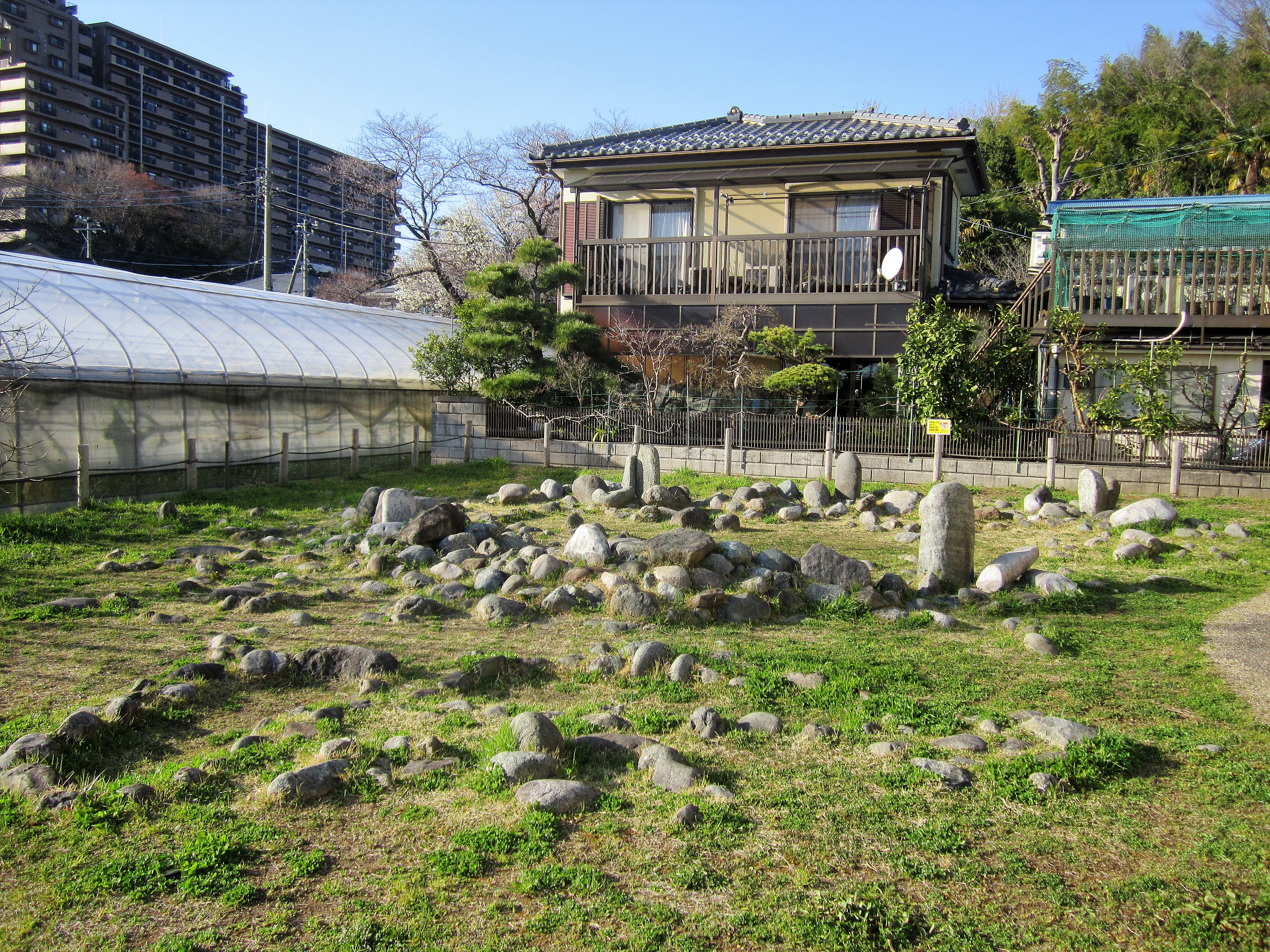
- Tabata Stone Circle

- Location within Tokyo Location within Japan
- Interactive map of Tabata Site
- 35°36′04″N 139°21′49″E
- Periods: Jōmon period
- Location: Machida, Tokyo, Japan
- Region: Kantō region

Site notes
- Discovered: 1968
- Public access: Yes

Tabata Site (田端遺跡, Tabata iseki) is a Jōmon period archaeological site with the remains of a stone circle in what is now the city of Machida, Tokyo, Japan. The site was designated a Prefectural Historic Site in 1971, with the area under protection extended in 2007.

== Overview ==
The site was discovered during agricultural work in 1968, with the stone circle identified during the second phase of survey and excavation. The site is understood to have changed in function over time, from a Middle Jōmon settlement, through a Late Jōmon burial site, with some thirty graves, to a worship site centred on the stone circle. The last measures some 7 metres (23 ft) north to south by 9 metres (30 ft) east to west; it has since been reburied and is presented through a reconstruction.

== See also ==
- List of Historic Sites of Japan (Tokyo)
- Kōgasaka Stone Age Site
