= Genkū-ji =

Buddhist temple in Tokyo, Japan

Coordinates: 35°42′52.1″N 139°47′04.7″E

- 源空寺
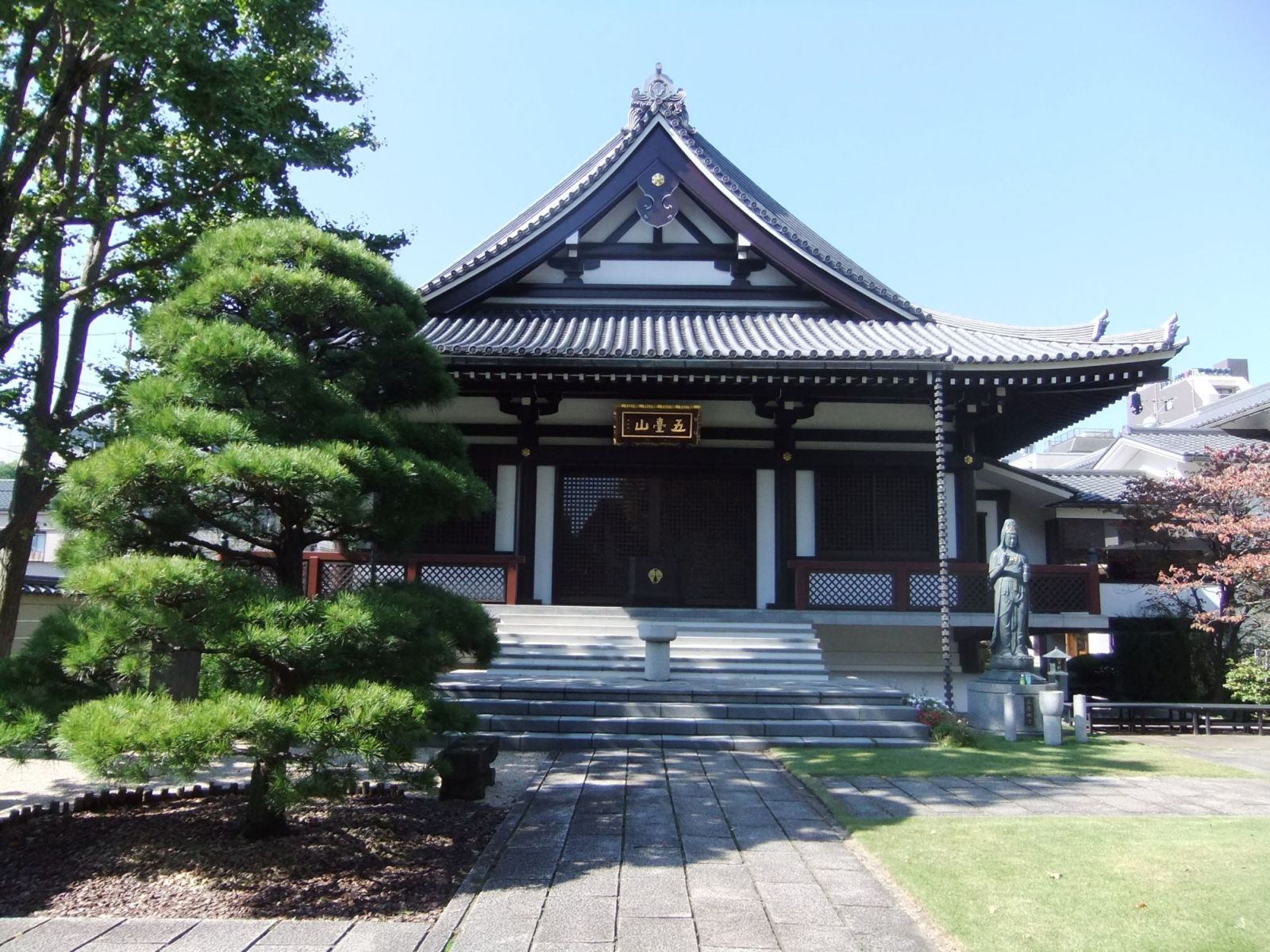
- Genkū-ji

- Location within Tokyo Location within Japan

Religion
- Affiliation: Buddhist
- Deity: Hōnen
- Rite: Jōdo-shū
- Status: functional

Location
- Location: 6-19-2 Higashiueno, Taito-ku, Tokyo 110-0015
- Country: Japan
- Interactive map of Genkū-ji

Architecture
- Completed: 1590

Genkū-ji (源空寺), is a Buddhist temple located in the Higashiueno neighborhood of Taitō-ku, Tokyo, Japan. The temple belongs to the Jōdo-shū sect of Japanese Buddhism and its honzon is a statue of Hōnen.

== History ==
Genkū-ji was established as a small chapel in 1590 in Yushima (currently part of Bunkyō, Tokyo), approximately where the Yushima Seido is now located. In 1604, Shogun Tokugawa Ieyasu made a grant of land to allow a proper temple to be established. In 1657, much of Edo burned down in the Great fire of Meireki, including Genkū-ji. The temple was rebuilt, but was moved to its present location as part of the Tokugawa shogunate's urban remodeling plan for Edo. Its urban location resulted in the destruction of the temple during fires in the Genroku era (1688-1704), Anei era (1772-1781), the 1923 Great Kantō earthquake and the Bombing of Tokyo (1945), but it was rebuilt each time. The temple's bonsho (bell) is dated 1636 and was a donation by Shogun Tokugawa Iemitsu.

The cemetery at Genku-ji contains the graves of a number of famous people:

- Inō Tadataka (1745 - 1818), surveyor and cartographer. The grave was designated a National Historic Site in 1928.
- Takahashi Yoshitoki (1764 - 1804), astronomer. The grave was designated a National Historic Site in 1928.
- Tani Bunchō (1763 - 1841), artist
- Banzuiin Chōbei (1622 - 1650), street tough

The temple is a two minute walk from Inaricho Station on the Tokyo Metro Ginza Line.

== See also ==
- List of Historic Sites of Japan (Tōkyō)
