= Nishigahara Ichirizuka =

Japanese historic site in Kita, Tokyo

- 西ヶ原一里塚 (Japanese)
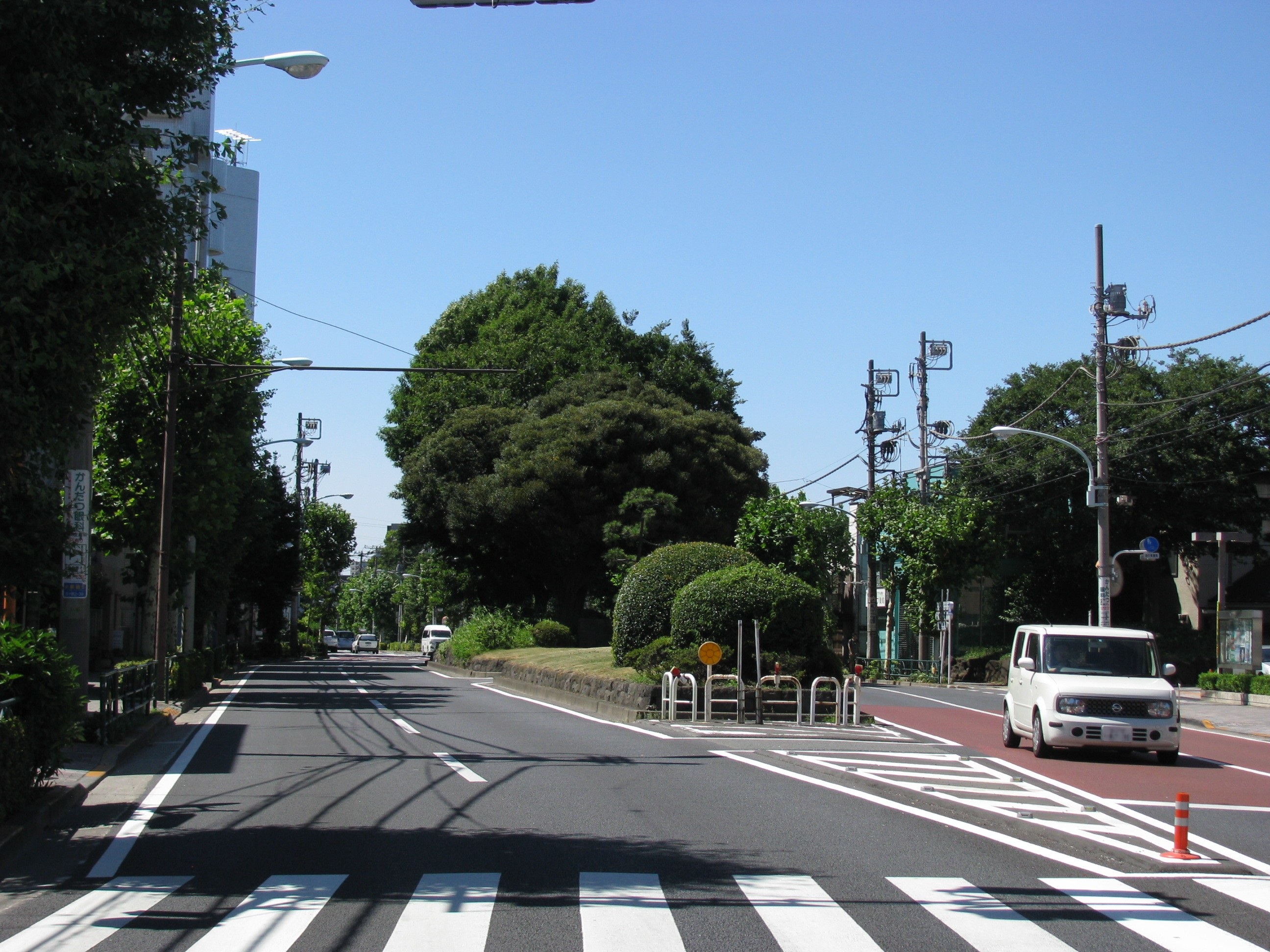
- Nishigahara Ichirizuka

- Nishigahara Ichirizuka Nishigahara Ichirizuka (Japan)
- 35°44′50″N 139°44′38″E
- Type: ichirizuka
- Periods: Edo period
- Location: Kita, Tokyo, Japan
- Region: Kantō region

Site notes
- Public access: Yes

The Nishigahara Ichirizuka (西ヶ原一里塚) is a historic Japanese distance marker similar to a milestone, comprising a pair of earthen mounds located in what is now Kita, Tokyo in the Kantō region of Japan. It was designated a National Historic Site of Japan in 1922.

== Overview ==
During the Edo period Tokugawa shogunate established ichirizuka on major roads, enabling calculation both of distance travelled and of the charge for transportation by kago or palanquin. These mounds, denoted the distance in ri (3.927 kilometres (2.440 mi)) to Nihonbashi, the "Bridge of Japan", erected in Edo in 1603. Since the Meiji period, most of the ichirizuka have disappeared, having been destroyed by then elements, modern highway construction and urban encroachment. In 1876, the "Ichirizuka Abolition" decree was issued by the Meiji government and many were demolished at that time. Currently, 17 surviving ichirizuka are designated as national historic sites.

The Nishigahara ishirizuka were the second from Nihonbashi on the Nikkō Kaidō highway (Iwatsuki Highway), next to Hongo Oiwake. Each mound occupies a space of three by three meters, with a height of one meter, and are planted with enoki trees. The mounds were preserved through a successful petition by local townspeople and by Shibusawa Eiichi, and the modern road which would have destroyed them was diverted to preserve the site. The northern mound is now an island in the middle of Tokyo Metropolitan Route 455, but the southern mound is accessible to the public. The ichirizuka is a 20-minute walk from Oji Station on the JR East Keihin Tōhoku Line.

== See also ==
- List of Historic Sites of Japan (Tōkyō)
