= Musashi Kokufu =

Japanese archaeological site

Musashi Provincial Capital ruins
- 武蔵国府跡 (Japanese)
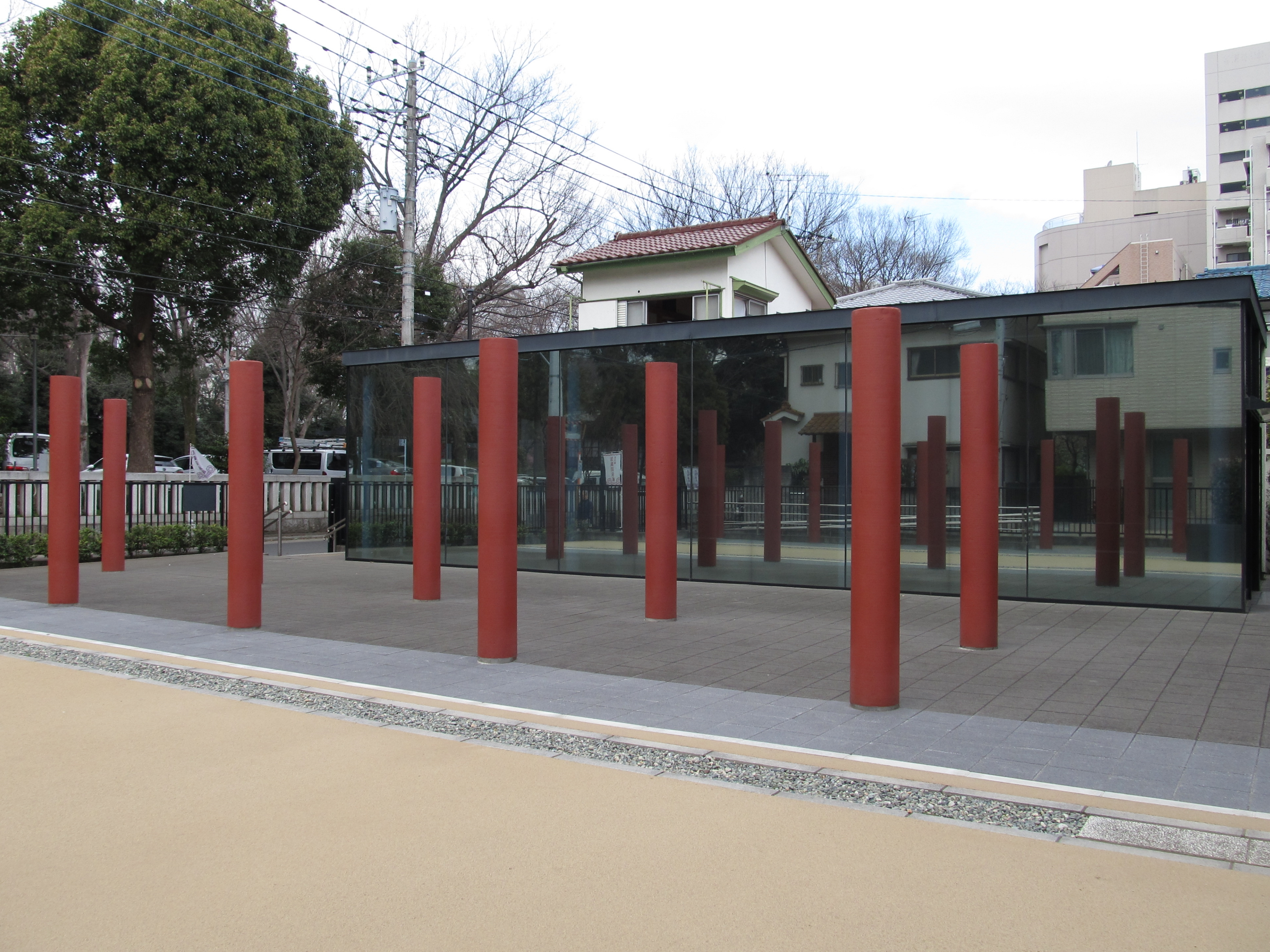
- Musashi Provincial Capital ruins

- Musashi Provincial Capital ruins Musashi Kokufu (Japan)
- 35°40′06″N 139°28′45″E
- Periods: Nara - Heian period
- Location: Fuchū, Tokyo, Japan
- Region: Kantō region

Site notes
- Public access: Yes

The Musashi Provincial Capital ruins (武蔵国府跡, Musashi kokufu ato) is an archaeological site with the ruins of a Nara to Heian period government administrative complex located in what is now part of the city of Fuchū, Tokyo in the Kantō region of Japan. Identified as the ruins of the kokufu (provincial capital) of Musashi Province, the site has been protected as a National Historic Site from 2009.

== Overview ==
In the late Nara period, after the establishment of a centralized government under the Ritsuryō system, local rule over the provinces was standardized under a kokufu (provincial capital), and each province was divided into smaller administrative districts, known as (郡, gun, kōri), composed of 2–20 townships in 715 AD. The kokufu complex contained the official residence and offices of the kokushi, the official sent from the central government as provincial governor, along with buildings housing offices concerned with general administration, farming, finance, police and military. In the periphery there was a provincial school (kokugaku), the garrison and storehouses for taxes.

The Musashi Provincial Capital ruins are located in the Miyamachi neighborhood of Fuchū, at the edge of a cliff formed by the Tama River, with the site currently occupied by the Ōkunitama Shrine. The surrounding area contains many Kofun period remains, and from the late 7th to late 8th century, the population of an area 2.4 kilometers east-to-west by 1.2 kilometers north-to-south of this shrine had a massive population growth, with the traces of more than 4000 pit dwellings having been discovered under what is now the center of Fuchū city.

Per an archaeological excavation of the shrine precincts and the surrounding area, the layout of structures corresponding to that of the semi-standardized format for a government office complex was found. The ruins consisted of the foundations for the pillars used for a two large buildings orientated east-to-west, and three buildings arranged north-to-south, with the buildings in a U-shaped orientation. Traces of moats on the south, west and north sides of these foundations indicate that they occupied a complex roughly 100 meters square, with the total complex measuring 300 meters from north to south by 200 meters from east to west. The complex was built in the first half of the 8th century and fell into ruins around the end of the 10th century. The Wamyō Ruijushō from 935 AD states only that the provincial capital of Musashi was in "Tama County" and does not give the exact location. At least five candidate sites have been considered by scholars since the Edo period; however, from the artifacts discovered, scale of the ruins, and its location on the Kōshū Kaidō highway linking Musashi with Kai Province, this site is now regarded as the correct one.

Excavated artifacts include the names of 19 of the 21 Musashi counties written on tiles and rocks with a spatula, engraving, and ink. The site is about a five-minute walk from Fuchūhommachi Station on the JR East Musashino Line.

== See also ==
- List of Historic Sites of Japan (Tōkyō)
