= Suzuki Site =

- 鈴木遺跡 (Japanese)
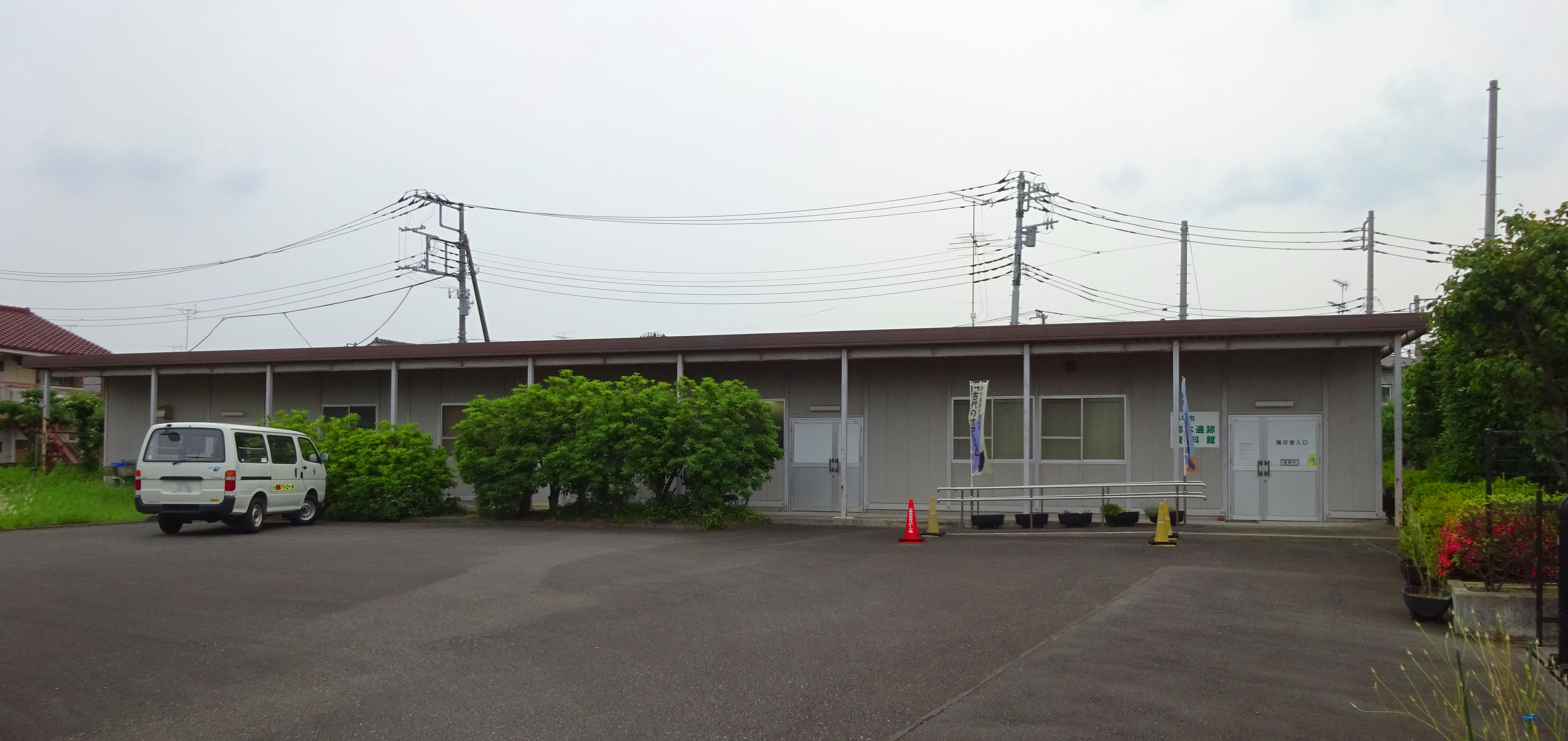
- Suzuki Archeological Museum

- Suzuki Site Suzuki Site (Japan)
- 35°43′7″N 139°29′47.5″E
- Type: settlement
- Periods: Japanese Paleolithic
- Location: Kodaira, Tokyo, Japan
- Region: Kantō region

Site notes
- Public access: Yes (museum)

The Suzuki Site (鈴木遺跡, Suzuki iseki) is an archaeological site in the city of Kodaira, Tokyo Metropolis, in the Kantō region of Japan containing a Japanese Paleolithic period settlement trace. It was designated a National Historic Site of Japan in 2021.

== Overview ==
The Suzuki site is located at the headwaters of the Shakujii River in eastern part of Kodaira and almost in the center of the Musashino Plateau at an elevation of 73 to 75 meters. With a total area of about 220,000 m2, it is one of the largest National Historic Sites in Tokyo. The site was discovered in 1967 and was formerly known as the Megurita Site (回田遺跡, Megurita iseki), and was believed to have been the ruins of a watermill and associated drain from the Edo period. However, when excavated in 1974 in conjunction with the construction of the Suzuki Elementary School, these remains were found to be on top of a much older site, dating to the Upper Paleolithic period, approximately 35,000 to 15,000 years ago. Stone tools made of obsidian and large spear tips were discovered. Since that time, more than 50 survey points have been excavated to determine the size of the site, and the area was designated a Tokyo Metropolis Historic Site in 2012, with the area under protection expanded in 2017. Many of the artifacts found in these excavations are displayed at the Suzuki Archaeological Museum (鈴木遺跡資料館, Suzuki iseki shiryōkan) at site. Excavations are ongoing, and remains from the Jōmon period, Yayoi period and into the pre-modern period have been discovered, indicating that this location has been inhabited for many thousands of years.

== See also ==
- List of Historic Sites of Japan (Tōkyō)
