= List of historic sites of Japan (Tokyo) =

This list is of the historic sites of Japan located within the Metropolis of Tōkyō.

== National Historic Sites ==
As of 1 January 2021, fifty-three Sites have been designated as being of national significance (including three *Special Historic Sites).

Site	Municipality	Comments	Image	Coordinates	Type	Ref.
*Former Hama-rikyū Teien Gardens 旧浜離宮庭園 kyū-Hama-rikyū teien	Chūō	Edo period gardens; also a Special Place of Scenic Beauty	Hama-rikyū Gardens	35°39′36″N 139°45′48″E	2, 8	712
*Edo Castle Site 江戸城跡 Edo-jō ato	Chiyoda	Edo period castle remnants	Edo Castle Site	35°41′18″N 139°45′16″E	2	723
*Koishikawa Kōrakuen Gardens 小石川後楽園 Koishikawa Kōrakuen	Bunkyō	Edo period gardens, also a Special Place of Scenic Beauty	Koishikawa Kōrakuen Gardens	35°42′20″N 139°44′57″E	8	683
Grave of Inō Tadataka 伊能忠敬墓 Inō Tadataka no haka	Taitō	Edo period cartographer; located at Genkū-ji (源空寺)	Grave of Inō Tadataka	35°42′51″N 139°47′05″E	7	3240
Tekigai-sō (Former Residence of Konoe Fumimaro) 荻外荘（近衞文麿旧宅） Tekigai-sō (Konoe Fumimaro kyū-taku)	Suginami	prewar villa of Prime Minister Konoe	Tekigai-sō	35°41′58″N 139°38′11″E	2, 8	00003929
Grave of Ogyū Sorai 荻生徂徠墓 Ogyū Sorai no haka	Minato	Edo period Confucian philosopher; located at Chōshō-ji (長松寺)	Grave of Ogyū Sorai	35°38′39″N 139°44′15″E	7	715
Shimofuda Site 下布田遺跡 Shimofuda iseki	Chōfu	Jōmon period settlement trace		35°38′39″N 139°32′56″E	1	732
Shitanoya Site 下野谷遺跡 Shitanoya iseki	Nishitōkyō	Jōmon period settlement trace	Shitanoya Site	35°43′32″N 139°33′43″E	1	00003888
Grave of Kamo no Mabuchi 加茂真淵墓 Kamo no Mabuchi no haka	Shinagawa	Edo period kokugaku scholar; located at Tōkai-ji (東海寺)	Grave of Kamo no Mabuchi	35°37′04″N 139°44′12″E	7	690
Grave of Gamō Kunpei 蒲生君平墓 Gamō Kunpei no haka	Taitō	Edo period Confucian scholar; located at Rinkō-ji (臨江寺)	Grave of Gamō Kunpei	35°43′14″N 139°45′58″E	7	704
Kamenokoyama Kofun 亀甲山古墳 Kamenokoyama kofun	Ōta	Kofun period tumulus	Kamenokoyama Kofun	35°35′21″N 139°40′02″E	1	695
Site of the Former Shimbashi Station 旧新橋停車場跡 kyū-Shimbashi teishajō ato	Minato	Meiji period train station site	Site of the Former Shimbashi Station	35°39′58″N 139°45′41″E	6	725
Former Imperial Land in Shirogane 旧白金御料地 kyū-Shirogane goryōchi	Minato, Shinagawa	Nature park; also a Natural Monument; now the Institute for Nature Study (属自然教育園), administered by the National Museum of Nature and Science	Former Imperial Land in Shirogane	35°38′19″N 139°43′10″E	2	713
Tamagawa-jōsui Waterworks 玉川上水 Tamagawa-jōsui	Setagaya, Shibuya, Suginami, Akishima, Fussa, Hamura, Kodaira, Koganei, Mitaka, Musashino, Nishitōkyō, Tachikawa	Edo period aqueduct	Tamagawa-jōsui Waterworks	35°42′45″N 139°30′47″E	6	3375
Mukōjima Hyakkaen Gardens 向島百花園 Mukōjima Hyakkaen	Sumida	Edo period gardens, also a Place of Scenic Beauty	Mukōjima Hyakkaen Gardens	35°43′27″N 139°48′56″E	8	730
Remains of the Outer Moat of Edo Castle 江戸城外堀跡 Edo-jō sotobori ato	Chiyoda, Shinjuku, Minato	Edo period fortifications	Remains of the Outer Moat of Edo Castle	35°41′35″N 139°44′15″E	2	722
Kōgasaka Stone Age Site 高ヶ坂石器時代遺跡 Kōgasaka sekki-jidai iseki	Machida	Jomon period settlement trace	Kōgasaka Stone Age Site	35°32′43″N 139°27′26″E	1	686
Grave of Takahashi Yoshitoki 高橋至時墓 Takahashi Yoshitoki no haka	Taitō	Edo period astronomer; located at Genkū-ji (源空寺)	Grave of Takahashi Yoshitoki	35°42′51″N 139°47′05″E	7	3241
Grave of Takashima Shūhan 高島秋帆墓 Takashima Shūhan no haka	Bunkyō	Edo period military theorist; located at Daien-ji (大円寺)	Grave of Takashima Shūhan	35°43′18″N 139°45′13″E	7	3239
Takanawa Great Wooden Gate site 高輪大木戸跡 Takanawa ōkido ato	Minato	Edo period city gate location	Takanawa Great Wooden Gate site	35°38′22″N 139°44′26″E	2, 6	696
Grave of Satō Issai 佐藤一斎墓 Satō Issai no haka	Minato	Edo period Confucian scholar; located at Jinko-ji (深廣寺)	Grave of Satō Issai	35°39′49″N 139°43′53″E	7	714
Grave of Hosoi Kōtaku 細井広沢墓 Hosoi Kōtaku no haka	Setagaya	Edo period Confucian scholar; located at Mangan-ji (満願寺)		35°36′37″N 139°38′58″E	7	716
Grave of Yamaga Sokō 山鹿素行墓 Yamaga Sokō no haka	Shinjuku	Edo period military strategist; located at Sōsan-ji (宗参寺)	Grave of Yamaga Sokō	35°42′18″N 139°43′29″E	7	3238
Shimura Ichirizuka 志村一里塚 Shimura ichirizuka	Itabashi	Edo period milestone	Shimura Ichirizuka	35°46′30″N 139°41′45″E	6	681
Koishikawa Botanical Gardens 小石川植物園（御薬園跡及び養生所跡） Koishikawa shokubutsuen (Oyakuen-ato oyobi yōjōjo-ato)	Bunkyō	Edo period gardens; also a Place of Scenic Beauty	Koishikawa Botanical Garden	35°42′29″N 139°45′08″E	1	00003765
Kobotoke Barrier Site 小仏関跡 Kobotoke seki ato	Hachiōji	Edo period highway checkpoint	Kobotoke Barrier Site	35°38′30″N 139°15′58″E	6	693
Grave of Matsudaira Sadanobu 松平定信墓 Matsudaira Sadanobu no haka	Kōtō	Edo period Shogunate official: located at Reigan-ji (霊巌寺)	Grave of Matsudaira Sadanobu	35°40′54″N 139°48′00″E	7	692
Remains of Tokiwabashi-mon Gate 常盤橋門跡 Tokiwabashi-mon ato	Chiyoda, Chūō	Site of Edo period gate to Edo Castle	Remains of Tokiwabashi-mon Gate	35°41′10″N 139°46′13″E	2	698
Jindaiji Castle ruins 深大寺城跡 Jindaiji-jō ato	Chōfu	Muromachi period notification ruins	Jindaiji Castle ruins	35°39′53″N 139°33′04″E	2	00003540
Nishigahara Ichirizuka 西ヶ原一里塚 Nishigahara ichirizuka	Kita	Edo period milestone	Nishigahara Ichirizuka	35°44′50″N 139°44′28″E	6	680
Nishiakiru Stone Age Dwelling Site 西秋留石器時代住居跡 Nishiakiru sekki-jidai jūkyo ato	Akiruno	Jōmon period settlement trace		35°43′03″N 139°17′25″E	1	699
Grave of Aoki Konyō 青木昆陽墓 Aoki Konyō no haka	Meguro	Edo period official; located at Ryūsenji	Grave of Aoki Konyō	35°37′44″N 139°42′30″E	7	711
Graves of Asano Naganori and the Akogishi (Forty-seven rōnin 浅野長矩墓および赤穂義士墓 Asano Naganori no haka oyobi Akogishi no haka	Minato	Edo period samurai famed by the Chūshingura, at Sengaku-ji	Graves of Asano Naganori and the Akogishi	35°38′15″N 139°44′09″E	7	679
Funada Stone Age Site 船田石器時代遺跡 Funada sekki-jidai iseki	Hachiōji	Jōmon period settlement trace		35°39′27″N 139°17′53″E	1	694
Ōmori Shell Mounds 大森貝塚 Ōmori kaizuka	Ōta, Shinagawa	Jōmon period shell midden	Ōmori Shell Mounds	35°35′35″N 139°43′49″E	1	721
Ōtsuka Confucian Cemetery 大塚先儒墓所 Ōtsuka senju bosho	Bunkyō	Edo period cemetery	Ōtsuka Confucian Cemetery	35°43′23″N 139°43′44″E	7	677
Takiyama Castle ruins 滝山城跡 Takiyama-jō ato	Hachiōji	Sengoku period castle ruins	Takiyama Castle ruins	35°42′04″N 139°19′40″E	2	717
Grave of Takuan 沢庵墓 Takuan no haka	Shinagawa	Edo period prelate; located at Tōkai-ji (東海寺)	Grave of Takuan	35°37′04″N 139°44′11″E	7	689
Nakazato Shell Mounds 中里貝塚 Nakazato kaizuka	Kita	Jōmon period shell midden	Nakazato Shell Mounds	35°44′41″N 139°45′15″E	1	3261
Tōzen-ji 東禅寺 Tōzenji	Minato	Temple used as first British Consulate in Japan in Bakumatsu period	Tōzenji	35°38′03″N 139°44′06″E	2, 3, 9	00003659
Yushima Seidō 湯島聖堂 Yushima Seidō	Bunkyō	Edo period Confucian academy	Yushima Seidō	35°42′02″N 139°45′59″E	4	678
Hachiōji Castle ruins 八王子城跡 Hachiōji-jō ato	Hachiōji	Sengoku period castle ruins	Hachiōji Castle ruins	35°39′11″N 139°15′20″E	2	718
Shinagawa Battery 品川台場 Shinagawa daiba	Minato	Bakumatsu period fortification	Shinagawa Battery	35°38′01″N 139°46′19″E	2	687
Musashi Kokufu ruins 武蔵国府跡 Musashi Kokufu ato	Fuchū	Nara period Provincial Capital of Musashi Province	Musashi Kokufu ruins	35°40′06″N 139°28′45″E	2	00003641
Musashi Kokubun-ji ruins 武蔵国分寺跡附東山道武蔵路跡 Musashi Kokubunji ato tsuketari Tōsandō Musashi-michi ato	Kokubunji	Nara period provincial temple of Musashi Province; designation includes the Tōsandō Musashi-michi Road Site	Musashi Kokubun-ji ruin	35°41′52″N 139°28′09″E	3	682
Musashi Fuchū Kumano Jinja Kofun 武蔵府中熊野神社古墳 Musashi Fuchū Kumano Jinja kofun	Fuchū	Kofun period tumulus	Musashi Fuchū Kumano Jinja Kofun	35°40′30″N 139°27′26″E	1	00003452
Tomb of Hiraga Gennai 平賀源内墓 Hiraga Gennai no haka	Taitō	Edo period inventor: located at former Sosen-ji cemetery	Tomb of Hiraga Gennai	35°43′41″N 139°48′21″E	7	3242
Yayoi 2-chōme Site 弥生二丁目遺跡 Yayoi ni-chōme iseki	Bunkyō	Yayoi period settlement trace	Yayoi 2-chōme Site	35°43′00″N 139°45′52″E	1	728
Hayashi clan cemetery 林氏墓地 Hayashi-shi bochi	Shinjuku	Edo period cemetery	Hayashi clan cemetery	35°42′02″N 139°43′43″E	7	688
Kunugita Site 椚田遺跡 Kunugita iseki	Hachiōji	Jōmon period settlement trace	Kunugita Site	35°38′11″N 139°18′31″E	1	729
Former Residence and Garden of Yokoyama Taikan 横山大観旧宅及び庭園 Yokoyama Taikan kyū-taku oyobi teien	Taitō	Showa period Nihongi painter studio; also a Place of Scenic Beauty	Former Residence and Garden of Yokoyama Taikan	35°42′44″N 139°46′06″E	8	00003974
Imperial Japanese Army Itabashi Arsenal Site 陸軍板橋火薬製造所跡 Rikugun Itabashi kayaku seizōsho ato	Itabashi	prewar Army gunpowder factory site	Imperial Japanese Army Itabashi Arsenal	35°45′03″N 139°42′33″E	6	00003993
Suzuki Site 鈴木遺跡 Suzuki iseki	Kodaira	Japanese Paleolithic site	Suzuki Site	35°43′07″N 139°29′48″E	4	00004113

== Prefectural Historic Sites ==
As of 1 May 2021, three hundred and twenty-nine Sites have been designated as being of prefectural importance.

Site	Municipality	Comments	Image	Coordinates	Type	Ref.
Inogata-Ogawazuka Kofun 猪方小川塚古墳; Inogata-Ogawazuka kofun	Komae	designation includes excavated grave goods		35°37′32″N 139°34′37″E		
Kitsunezuka Kofun (Shimofuda Tumulus No.6) 狐塚古墳（下布田６号墳） Kitsunezuka kofun (Shimofuda roku-gō fun)	Chōfu			35°38′43″N 139°32′57″E		
Shimoyakebe Site 下宅部遺跡; Shimoyakebe iseki	Higashimurayama			35°45′58″N 139°27′04″E		
Makino Memorial Garden (Makino Tomitarō Residence Site) 牧野記念庭園（牧野富太郎宅跡） Makino kinen teien (Makino Tomitarō taku ato)	Nerima	also a Prefectural Historic Site		35°44′48″N 139°35′07″E		
Tennō-ji Five-Storey Pagoda Site 天王寺五重塔跡; Tennōji gojūnotō ato	Taitō			35°43′36″N 139°46′17″E		
Tokugawa Yoshinobu Grave 徳川慶喜墓; Tokugawa Yoshinobu no haka	Taitō			35°43′24″N 139°46′19″E		
Nakamura Fusetsu Former Residence (Calligraphy Museum) 中村不折旧宅（書道博物館） Nakamura Fusetsu kyū-taku (Shodō Hakubutsukan)	Taitō			35°43′29″N 139°46′35″E		
Shiki-an 子規庵; Shiki-an	Taitō			35°43′28″N 139°46′35″E		
Shōgon Risshi Grave 浄厳律師墓; Shōgon Risshi no haka	Taitō	at Myōgoku-in (妙極院)		35°43′01″N 139°45′53″E		
Kitamura Kigin Grave 北村季吟墓; Kitamura Kigin no haka	Taitō	at Shōkei-ji (正慶寺)		35°42′51″N 139°45′57″E		
Setagaya Castle Site 世田谷城跡; Setagaya-jō ato	Setagaya	castle ruin of the Sengoku period		35°23′05″N 139°23′06″E		

== Municipal Historic Sites ==
As of 1 May 2020, a further three hundred and forty-one Sites have been designated as being of municipal importance.

== Registered Historic Sites ==
As of 1 January 2021, one Monument has been registered (as opposed to designated) as an Historic Site at a national level.

Site	Municipality	Comments	Image	Coordinates	Type	Ref.
Makino Memorial Garden 牧野記念庭園（牧野富太郎宅跡） Makino kinen teien (Makino Tomitarō taku ato)	Nerima	site of the residence of Makino Tomitarō		35°44′47″N 139°35′07″E		

== See also ==
- Cultural Properties of Japan
- Musashi Province
- History of Tokyo
- Tokyo National Museum
- List of museums in Tokyo
- List of Places of Scenic Beauty of Japan (Tōkyō)
- List of Cultural Properties of Japan - paintings (Tōkyō)
- List of Cultural Properties of Japan - historical materials (Tōkyō)
