= Ōtsuka Senju Bosho =

Cemetery in Tokyo, Japan

Otsuka Confucian Cemetery
- 大塚先儒墓所
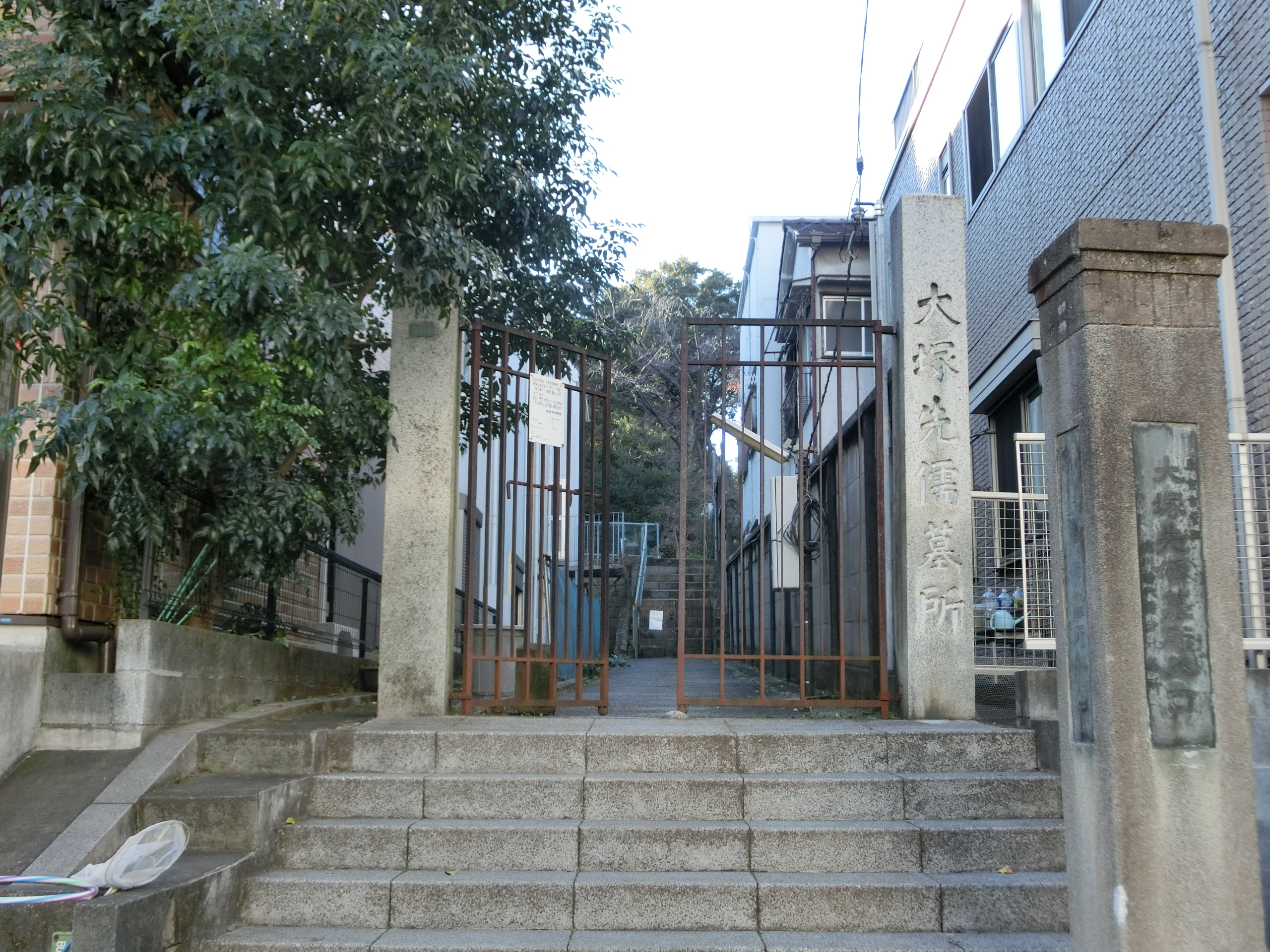
- Interactive map of Otsuka Confucian Cemetery

Details
- Established: 1670
- Abandoned: 1867
- Location: Bunkyō, Tokyo
- Country: Japan
- Coordinates: 35°43′23″N 139°43′44″E
- National Historic Site of Japan

Otsuka Confucian Cemetery (大塚先儒墓所, Ōtsuka senju bosho) is a cemetery located in Bunkyō, Tokyo, Japan containing the graves of a number of noted Confucian scholars from the Edo Period. It was designated a National Historic Site in 1921.

== Overview ==
Japanese funerary rites are typically held per Buddhist rituals. However, under the Edo period Tokugawa shogunate, the official government orthodoxy was based on Neo-Confucianism, and a number of scholars also rejected Buddhism for its perceived foreign origins, and chose to be buried according to Confucian rituals and with gravestones which were also free of Buddhist influence. The site of the Confucian cemetery was originally the site of a residence of Hitomi Dōsei, the Confucian tutor to Shōgun Tokugawa Hidetada and to Tokugawa Yorifusa. When Dōsei died in 1670, he was buried according to Confucian rites within the grounds of his estate, which was the beginning of the cemetery. The graves of Koga Seiri, Bidō Jishū, Kinoshita Jun'an, Muro Kyūsō, and several others are located here.

After the Meiji restoration, Confucianism feel into disfavor and the graveyard was abandoned. It was made a National Historic Site in 1921. The cemetery is located a five-minute walk from Gokokuji Station on the Tokyo Metro Yurakucho Line.

== See also ==
- List of Historic Sites of Japan (Tōkyō)
