= Nakazato Shell Mound =

Archaeological site in Tokyo, Japan

Nakazato Shell Midden
- 中里貝塚 (Japanese)
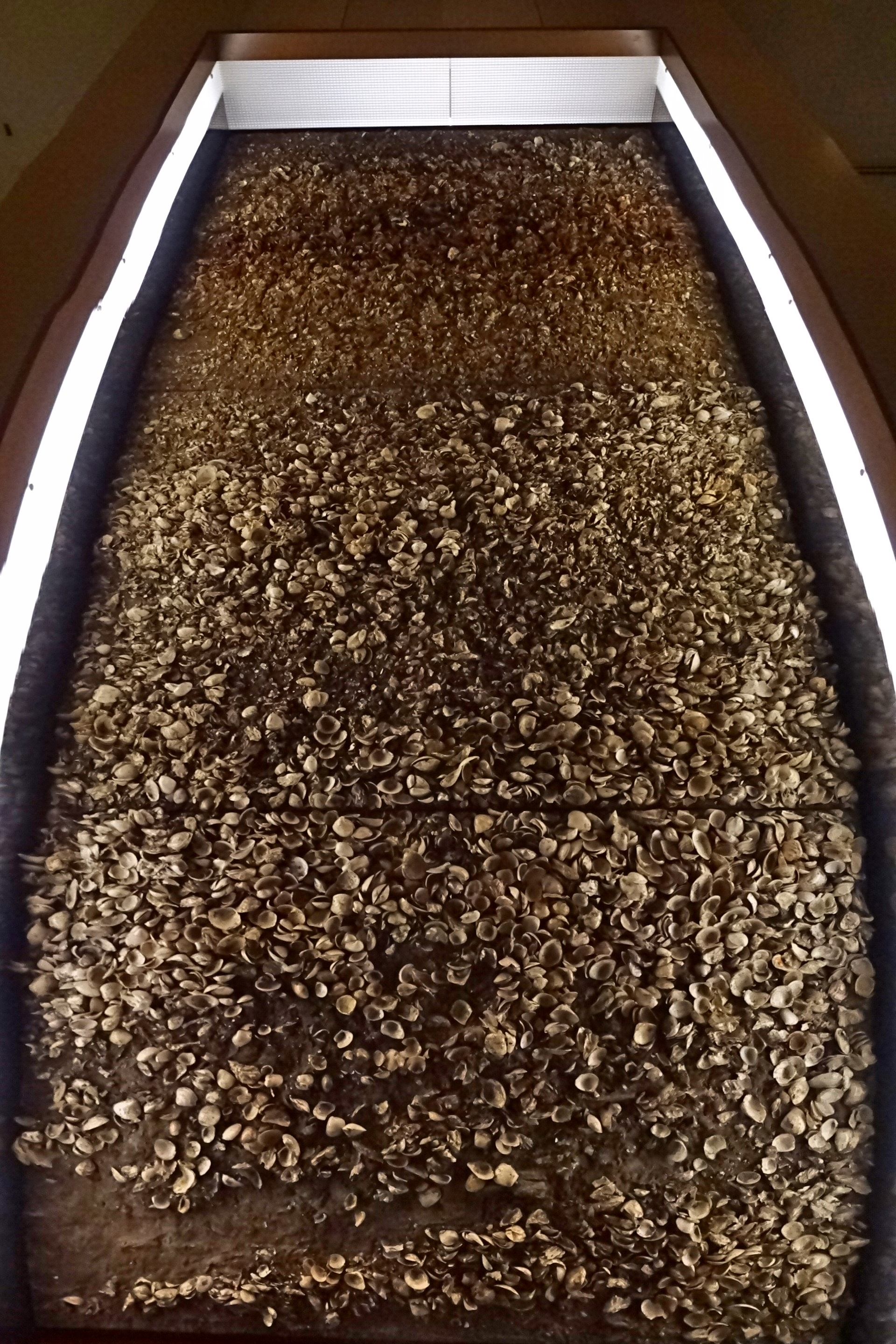
- cross-section of Nakazato Shell Midden

- Nakazato Shell Midden Nakazato Shell Mound (Japan)
- 35°44′40.1″N 139°45′15.6″E
- Type: shell midden
- Periods: middle Jōmon period
- Location: Kita-ku, Tokyo, Japan
- Region: Kantō region

Site notes
- Public access: Yes (museum)

The Nakazato Shell Midden (中里貝塚, Nakazato kaizuka) is an archaeological site in the Kaminakazato neighborhood of Kita-ku, Tokyo, in the Kantō region of Japan containing a middle Jōmon period shell midden, extending about 1.1 kilometers from Kami-Nakazato Station to Tabata Station. The midden was designated a National Historic Site of Japan in 2000.

== Overview ==
During the early to middle Jōmon period (approximately 4000 to 2500 BC), sea levels were five to six meters higher than at present, and the ambient temperature was also two deg C higher. During this period, the Kantō region was inhabited by the Jōmon people, many of whom lived in coastal settlements. The middens associated with such settlements contain bone, botanical material, mollusc shells, sherds, lithics, and other artifacts and ecofacts associated with the now-vanished inhabitants, and these features, provide a useful source into the diets and habits of Jōmon society. Most of these middens are found along the Pacific coast of Japan.

Although the site is now located a considerable distance inland from the coast of Tokyo Bay, during the Jōmon period it was located on a long inlet of the sea. At the highest sea level of the Holocene glacial retreat about 6000 years ago, a sea-facing cliff was formed between Akabane and Kaminoma by the invading waves. The Nakazato site is located just below this line. As the coastline receded, Nakazato became a wetland with a delta, and a peat layer containing a large amount of driftwood was deposited.

A full-scale archaeological excavation was conducted in 1958 at the shell mound, which has been attracting attention since the Meiji period, and a shell layer consisting of Hamaguri clams and oysters with a thickness of more than two meters was confirmed. Despite the significance of the site, much was destroyed during the construction of the Tōhoku Shinkansen with the Tōhoku Shinkansen viaduct and the Shin-Tokyo Shinkansen Vehicle Center now occupying much of the area. Excavations conducted during the construction were performed at a rapid pace from 1982 to 1984. Subsequent investigations also revealed one dugout canoe and two stone hearths. The canoe has a total length of 5.79 meters, maximum width of 0.72 meters, and is as thin as two cm at the bottom. Since there are burnt marks on various parts of the surface, it is thought that it was scraped with a stone tool while burning with fire. It is estimated to be about 4700 years old from the dating of the pottery excavated around it, and is the only Jōmon-period boat found thus far in the Tokyo area.

In the 1996 excavation, a large shell layer with a thickness of four meters and two shallow dish-shaped pits thought to be shell processing facilities were found. Since large and small roasted stones and lumps of oysters were excavated from the pit, it is presumed that this was a processing plant used to open large quantities of shellfish by placing them in the pit, filling it with water, and then adding the heated stones to boil the water. From the excavated Jōmon pottery, the shell layer was dated to be from the middle to the early part of the late Jōmon period (4600 to 3900 years ago). The shell layer has a maximum thickness of about 4.5 meters, a length of about one kilometer and a width of about 70 to 100 meters, making it the largest shell midden yet discovered in Japan. There were few traces of settlement; however, planks forming a wooden path and wooden stakes used for aquaculture were found, indicating that this was more of an industrial site specializing in processing dried shellfish for supply to inland areas than a normal midden associated with a settlement. It also raises the possibility that the cultivation of oysters, long thought to have been invented by ancient Rome, was in fact practiced many thousands of years earlier by the Jōmon people.

Artifacts from the site are preserved and displayed at the Asukayama Museum (北区飛鳥山博物館, Kita-ku Asukayama Hakubutsukan). The site is about a 10-minute walk from Oku Station on the JR Tōhoku Main Line or Kami-Nakazato Station on the Keihin Tōhoku Line.

== See also ==
- List of Historic Sites of Japan (Tōkyō)
