= Tokyo Second Army Arsenal =

- 東京第二陸軍造兵廠 (Tōkyō Dai Ni Rikugun Zōheishō)
- Itabashi-ku, Tokyo in Japan
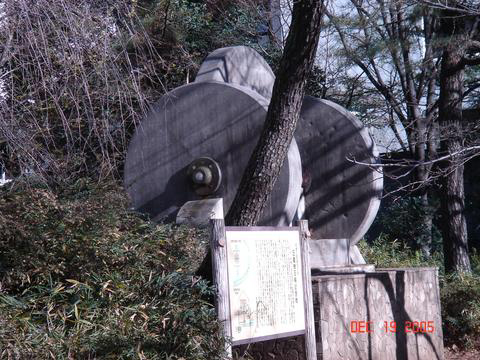
- Gunpowder Grinding Wheel at Kaganishi Park

Site information
- Type: Arsenal
- Owner: Empire of Japan
- Operator: Imperial Japanese Army

Location
- Location within Tokyo Location within Japan
- Coordinates: 35°45′03″N 139°42′33″E

Site history
- Built: 1871
- In use: 1945

The Tokyo Second Army Arsenal (東京第二陸軍造兵廠, Tōkyō Dai Ni Rikugun Zōheishō) was a weapons and ammunition production complex under the direct control of the Imperial Japanese Army, headquartered in Itabashi, Tokyo, Japan. Together with the Tokyo First Army Arsenal located on the opposite end of Tokyo, it was one of the primary army weapons arsenals during the Pacific War. In addition to the main Itabashi facility, subsidiary plants existed at Tama (Inagi and Tama, Tokyo), Fukaya (Fukaya, Saitama), Sone (Kitakyushu, Fukuoka), Uji (Uji, Kyoto), Iwatsuki (Iwatsuki-ku, Saitama), Tadanoumi (Takehara, Hiroshima), Kaori (Hirakata, Osaka) and Arao (Arao, Kumamoto). The Itabashi site was designated a National Historic Site of Japan in 2017.

== Overview ==
In 1865, a Japanese engineer named Sawa Tarozaemon was sent to the Netherlands by the Tokugawa shogunate to study techniques for the mass production of gunpowder, which had only been produced by hand in small quantities during the Edo period. He purchased a large hydraulically-powered grinding wheel in Belgium, which is still preserved at the site as a monument. In 1871, a gunpowder and artillery factory was established on the site of the former Edo residence of Kaga Domain, which had access to the Shakujii River for hydraulic power. This was the first explosives factory established by the Meiji government, and was also the largest government-owned factory in Japan at the time. Initially known as the Itabashi Explosives Factory, from 1936 it also housed the Army Explosives Research Institute which had brick building containing materials testing laboratories, a combustion laboratory, and a ballistic tube in which the performance of ammunition could be tested under actual conditions with shot fired into an earthwork. It became the head office of the Tokyo Second Army Arsenal in 1940. However, due to the worsening war situation, the Itabashi factory was evacuated by October 1944 and most of its production was relocated to Fukaya. with its new headquarters located at the site of current Fukaya Daiichi High School.

After the surrender of Japan, the Itabashi site was redeveloped into schools and factories with a large portion coming under the control of the Noguchi Research Institute and RIKEN, who made use of the surviving laboratories and developed the location into one of the main physics research sites in Japan. A number of buildings from the prewar period survived in the grounds, as well as the grounds of the nearby Tokyo Kasei University. In 2008, the "Former Tokyo Second Army Corps of Engineers Building" (on the premises of Tokyo Kasei University) became a Tangible Cultural Property of Itabashi Ward.

In 2014, when Asahi Kasei Real Estate planned to redevelop the site, Itabashi Ward formed a modern heritage group research team and successfully petitioned to rezone the proposed side as a public historic park, which secured protection as a National Historic Site in 2017 as the "Army Itabashi Explosives Factory Site".

== See also ==
- List of Historic Sites of Japan (Tōkyō)
