= Shitanoya Site =

Shitanoya ruins
- 下野谷遺跡 (Japanese)
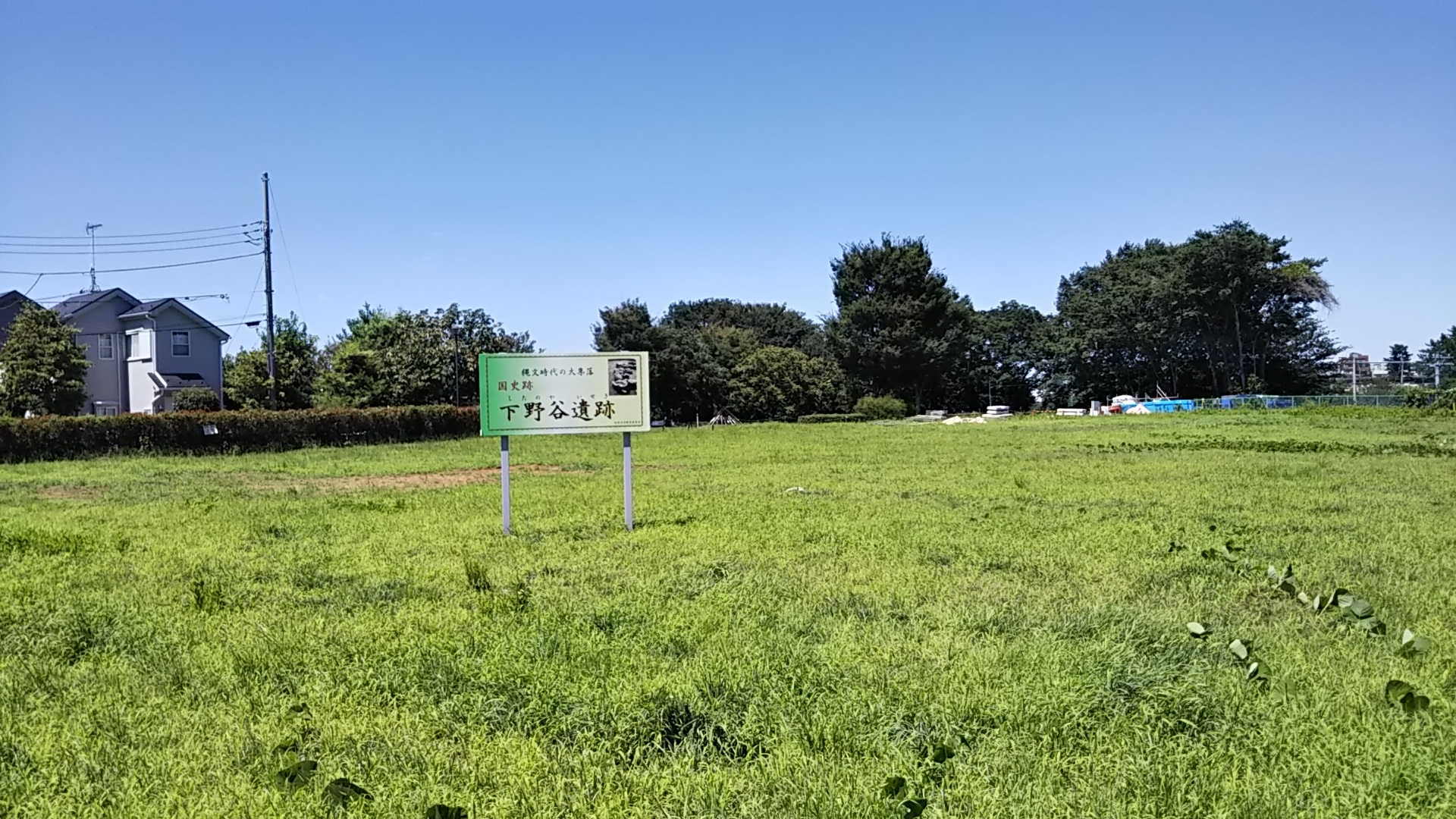
- Shitanoya ruins

- Shitanoya ruins Shitanoya Site (Japan)
- 35°43′32″N 139°33′43″E
- Type: settlement
- Periods: Jōmon period
- Location: Nishitōkyō, Tokyo, Japan
- Region: Kantō region

Site notes
- Public access: Yes (park)

The Shitanoya ruins (下野谷遺跡, Shitanoya iseki) is an archaeological site in the city of Nishitōkyō, Tokyo Metropolis, in the Kantō region of Japan containing a Jōmon period settlement ruin. The site was designated a National Historic Site of Japan in 2015.

== Overview ==
The Shitanoya site is located in the lowlands on the south bank of the Shakujii River, and consists of a pair of ring-shaped settlements from the middle of the Jōmon period. These settlements are divided by a small creek, and it is uncertain if they existed simultaneously. The larger is on the west side, and has a diameter of about 150 meters. The site contains the foundations of a number of pit dwellings, a cemetery, and a group of raised-floor buildings, presumed to be granaries, arranged around a central plaza. It was inhabited for approximately a thousand years. Such circular settlements from the middle Jōmon period (about 5,000 to 4,000 years ago) are widely distributed in Kantō and Kōshin'etsu regions, and the Musashino Terrace and Tama Hills have the second highest density of such settlements next to the cluster at the southern foot of Mount Yatsugatake in Nagano Prefecture.

Many pieces of Jōmon pottery have been found at the site before World War II, including many which originated in the southern Tōhoku region. The site was first excavated in 1950 by archaeologist Tadashi Yoshida. At the time it was called the "Sakagami Ruins". Large scale excavations were conducted in 1973 and 1975 and the site was renamed to its present name. This is one of the largest known middle Jōmon period settlements in the southern Kantō region.

The site was backfilled after excavation, but is preserved as Shitanoya Archaeological Park (下野谷遺跡公園, Shitanoya iseki kōen). The site is a seven minute walk from Higashi-Fushimi Station on the Seibu Shinjuku Line.

== See also ==
- List of Historic Sites of Japan (Tōkyō)
