= Kunugita Site =

- 椚田遺跡 (Japanese)
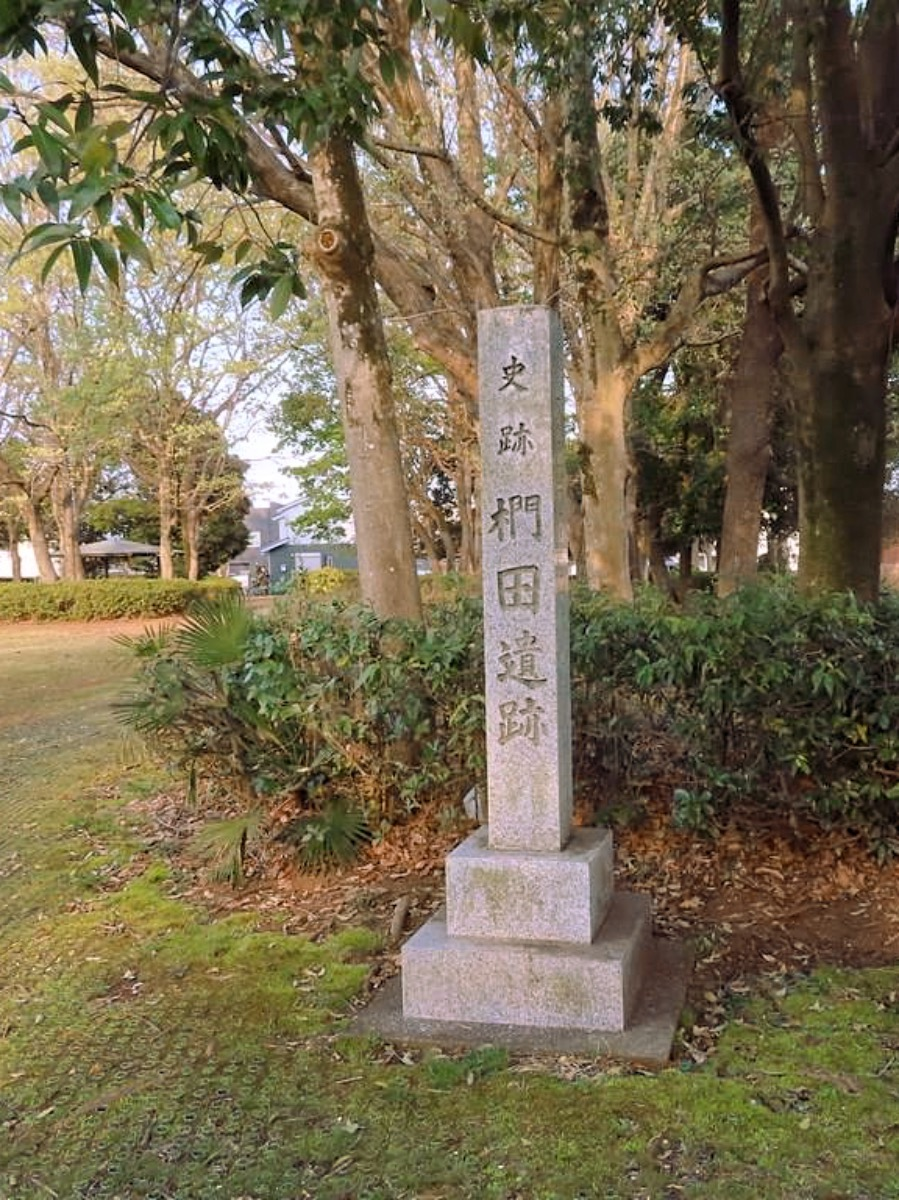
- Kunugita Site

- Kunugita Site Kunugita Site (Japan)
- 35°38′11″N 139°18′31″E
- Type: settlement trace
- Periods: Jomon period
- Location: Hachiōji, Tokyo, Japan
- Region: Kantō region

Site notes
- Public access: Yes

The Kunugita Site (椚田遺跡, Kunugita iseki) is an archaeological site with the traces of a Jōmon period through Kofun period settlement located in the Kunugiya neighborhood of the city of Hachiōji, Tokyo in the Kantō region of Japan. It received protection as a National Historic Site in 1978.

== Overview ==
The Kunugita site is located on a ridge that extended south into the Hachiōji basin. An archaeological excavation in 1975 confirmed that this ridge was a tell consisting of three layers. The uppermost surface had the ruins of a village from the Kofun period, the middle layer contained the ruins of a village of the late-middle Jōmon period, and the lowest layer had the ruins of a village of the middle Jōmon period. The remains of the Kofun period were small, but the settlements of the Jōmon period were large. Only one-sixth of the site was excavated, but in this portion the foundations of 45 pit dwellings were discovering, indicating that the village was a sizable settlement with perhaps 270 dwellings in total. The foundations indicate that the settlement was arranged as a ring of dwellings around a central plaza with a diameter of 150 meters. Some of the buildings had flagstone floors, and a number of burials were also found. The amount of recovered artifacts was very large, including many examples of Jōmon pottery and stone tools. The excavated relics are stored in the Hachioji City Folk Museum (八王子市郷土資料館, Hachiōji-shi Gyōdo shiryōkan), with some exhibited in the permanent displays, with the site itself preserved as a public park.

The site are about a 5-minute walk from the "Kunugita Kita" bus stop from Nishi-Hachioji Station on the JR East Chūō Main Line.

== See also ==
- List of Historic Sites of Japan (Tōkyō)
