= Nishiakiru Stone Age Dwelling Site =

Archaeological site in Japan

- 西秋留石器時代住居跡 (Japanese)
- Nishiakiru Stone Age Dwelling Site Nishiakiru Stone Age Dwelling Site (Japan)
- 35°43′03″N 139°17′25″E
- Type: settlement trace
- Periods: late Jomon period
- Location: Akiruno, Tokyo, Japan
- Region: Kantō region

Site notes
- Public access: Yes (no facilities)

Nishiakiru Stone Age Dwelling Site (西秋留石器時代住居跡, Nishiakiru sekki-jidai jūkyo ato) is the name for an archaeological site with the remnant of a late Jōmon period settlement located in the Ushinuma neighborhood of the city of Akiruno, Tokyo in the Kantō region of Japan. It received protection as a National Historic Site in 1933.

== Overview ==
The Nishiakiru site is located on a river terrace on the bank of the Akikawa River. Per an archaeological excavation conducted in 1932, the remains of five pit dwellings with flagstone floors, two tombs with clay sarcophagus, and one stone-framed hearth were discovered, and were dated to the late Jōmon period. One side of the floor had an overhang to serve as a doorway. At the time of its discovery, such buildings had only been known to exist in the western and central mountainous areas of the Kantō region from the middle Jōmon period (about 3500 years ago), and this discovery proved that such buildings also existed in the flatlands.

The site has been backfilled after excavation, and there is nothing at the location but an explanatory placard. It is a five-minute walk from the "Ushinuma" bus stop on the Nishi Tokyo Bus from Akigawa Station on the JR East Itsukaichi Line.

== See also ==
- List of Historic Sites of Japan (Tōkyō)
