= Jindaiji Castle =

- 深大寺城
- Chōfu, Tokyo, Japan
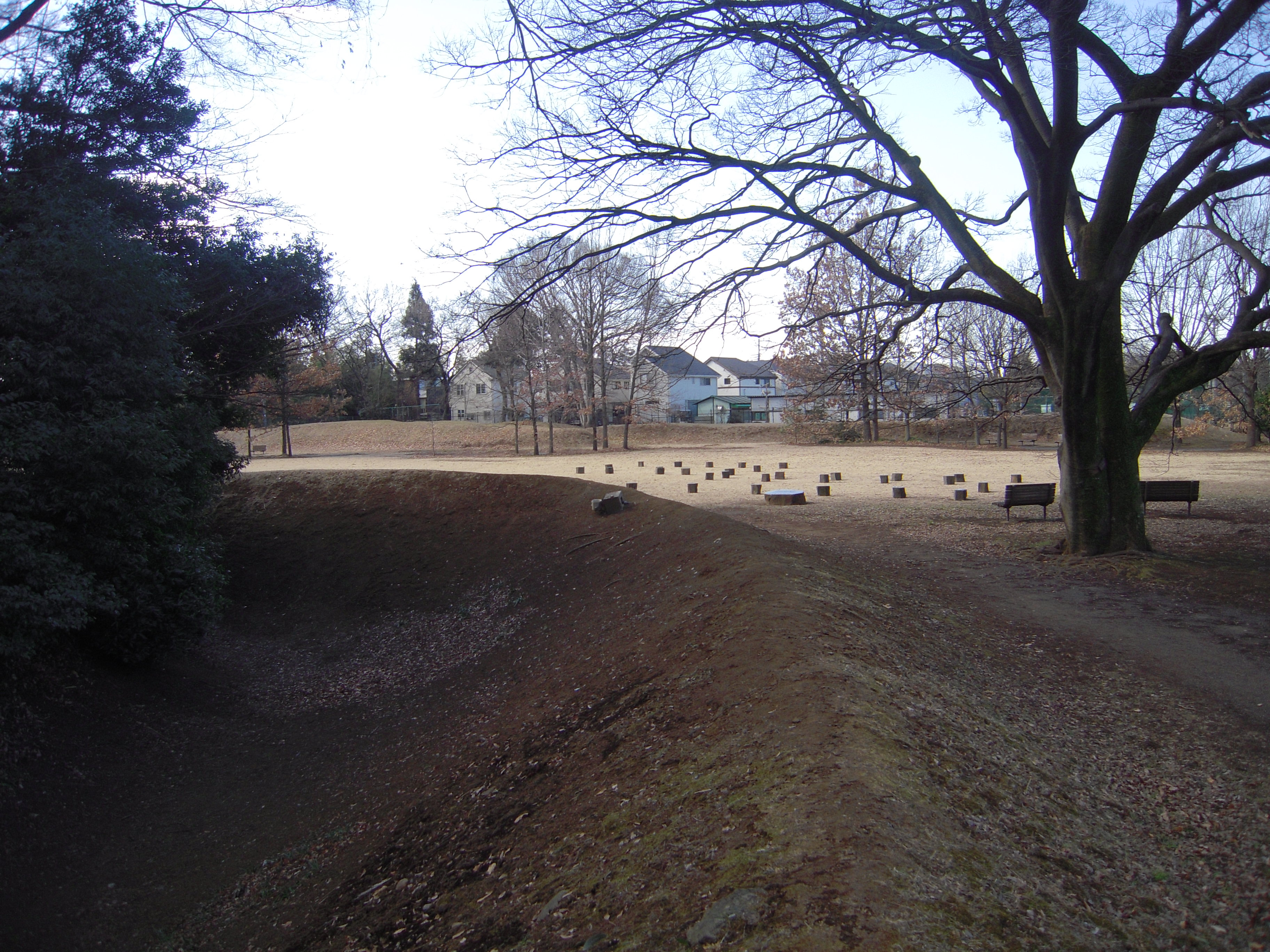
- Jindaiji Castle ruins

Site information
- Type: Japanese castle
- Open to the public: yes
- Condition: ruins

Location
- Jindaiji Castle Jindaiji Castle (Japan)
- Coordinates: 35°39′53.4″N 139°33′3.71″E

Site history
- Built by: Uesugi clan
- In use: Sengoku period
- Demolished: 1537

Jindaiji Castle (深大寺城, Jindaiji-jō) was a Sengoku period Japanese castle, located in what is now the city of Chōfu, Tokyo, in the Kantō region of Japan Its ruins have been protected as a National Historic Site since 2007.

== Overview ==
Jindaiji Castle is located on a small rise on the edge of the Musashino Terrace in between the center of modern Chōfu and Mitaka cities. The center of the Kantō Plain does not suitable terrain for fortifications, and thus many of the castles in this area utilized small hills along rivers, or swampy areas. This small rise spreads to the east and west and is bordered by the Nogawa River to the south. On the north is a small creek and valley, across which was the ancient temple of Jindai-ji, on a neighboring hill.The castle was situated at a juncture of the west and middle route of the Kamakura Kaidō road connecting the capital of the Kamakura shogunate with Kōzuke Province and Shimotsuke Province.

Jindaiji Castle had a concentric plan, with an inner bailey surrounded by a second bailey and a third bailey. The inner bailey was rectangular, measuring about 80 by 40 meters, which has the main gate at its north side and a back gate at its south side. It was protected by a dry moat and clay ramparts. At the side of the main gate was a yagura watchtower which projected out to protect the walls. The secondary bailey was to the west of the inner bailey and measured approximately 200 by 50 meters. The third bailey, now mostly lost, is thought to have measured 400 by 100 meters.

== History ==
The foundation of Jindaiji Castle is uncertain, but based on its location, it is believed to have begun as a small fort during the Kamakura period. In 1537, Uesugi Tomosada, chieftain of the Ogigayatsu branch of the Uesugi clan rebuilt it as a base of operations to control Musashi province north of the Tama River. The Ogigayatsu Uesugi held the post of Kantō Kanrei, theoretically as the deputy to the Kantō kubō, a member of the Ashikaga clan who ruled the Kantō region as viceroy for the Muromachi shogunate. However, in practice, the Kantō kubō had a tendency to rebel against the authority of the shogunate, whereas the Ogigayatsu Uesugi remained loyal. This resulted in an endless series of battles and shifting alliances and betrayals over centuries, leaving the Uesugi clan in control over the western half of the Kantō region, and the Ashikaga of the Kantō kubō of the eastern half; however, the Uesugi Clan itself was weakened by internal strife which led open warfare between the Ogigayatsu-branch and a rival Yamanouchi-branch of the clan.

The weakened state of the Uesugi clan was exploited by Hōjō Soun of the Late Hōjō clan, who seized Sagami Province from the Uesugi and their retainers and who threatened their position in Musashi. In 1524, Hōjō Ujitsuna invaded Musashi, taking Edo Castle and Iwatsuki Castle. Uesugi Tomooki (1488-1537) recovered Iwatsuki, but was unable to retake Edo. His successor, Uesugi Tomosada (1525-1546) reinforced Jindaiji Castle as part of his defensive line to protect Kawagoe Castle and the approaches to the Tama River from the Hōjō. However, this strategy failed, as Hōjō Ujitsuna simply bypassed the castle and attacked Kawagoe directly in 1537. Uesugi Tomosada fled to Musashi-Matsuyama Castle and continued the fight to recover Kawagoe for the next ten years until his death in battle. Jindaiji Castle was used briefly by the Hōjō clan, but its position was not suitable for local administration, and it was soon abandoned.

== Current situation ==
The castle now lies in ruins, and the outer areas lost to urban encroachment. The structure of the remaining portion is difficult to ascertain. Today castle site become a part of the grounds of the Jindai Botanical Garden. The site can be reached by bus from the JR East Chūō Main Line Mitaka Station.

== See also ==
- List of Historic Sites of Japan (Tōkyō)

== Literature ==
- Motoo, Hinago (1986). Japanese Castles. Tokyo: Kodansha. p. 200 pages. ISBN 0-87011-766-1.
- Turnbull, Stephen (2003). Japanese Castles 1540-1640. Osprey Publishing. p. 64 pages. ISBN 1-84176-429-9.
