= Funada Stone Age Site =

Archaeological site in Japan

- 船田石器時代遺跡 (Japanese)
- Funada Stone Age Site Funada Stone Age Site (Japan)
- 35°39′27″N 139°17′53″E
- Type: settlement trace
- Periods: late Jomon period
- Location: Hachiōji, Tokyo, Japan
- Region: Kantō region

Site notes
- Public access: Yes (no facilities)

Funada Stone Age Site (船田石器時代遺跡, Funada sekki-jidai iseki) is the name for an archaeological site with the remnant of a late Jōmon period settlement located in the Nagabusa neighborhood of the city of Hachiōji, Tokyo in the Kantō region of Japan. It received protection as a National Historic Site in 1928.

== Overview ==
The Funada site is located on a river terrace on the bank of the Funada River, which flows north to the Minamiasa River, which in turn flows to the east. Per an archaeological excavation conducted in 1927, the remains of a pit dwelling with a flagstone floor was discovered. The flagstones were river stones laid out in a circle with a diameter of five meters, and there was the trace of a stone-lined hearth with a diameter of 60-centimeters in the center of the structure. In the southeast corner of the building, a pot-shaped earthenware with a height of about 30 centimeters was found buried under the paving stones. Per a subsequent investigation in 1968, traces of a further 317 dwellings and an old burial mound were discovered, confirming this to have been a relatively large settlement for the time.

The site has been backfilled after excavation, and there is nothing at the location but explanatory placards, but the site and surrounding area is a public park. It is a short minute walk from the "Kodomokan-mae" bus stop on the Keio Bus from Nishi-Hachiōji Station on the JR East Chūō Main Line.

== See also ==
- List of Historic Sites of Japan (Tōkyō)
