= Reigan-ji (Kōtō) =

Building in Tokyo, Japan

Coordinates: 35°40′53.5″N 139°47′59.6″E

- 霊巌寺
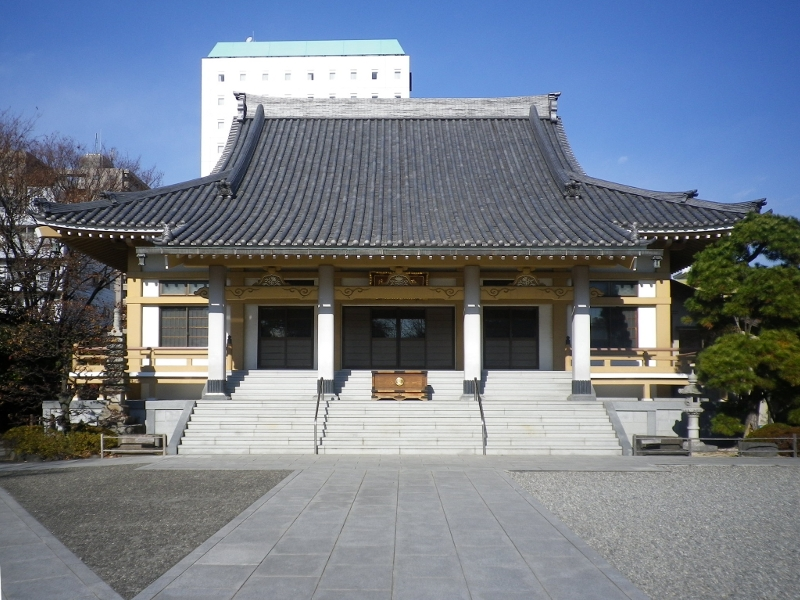
- Reigan-ji

- Location within Tokyo Location within Japan

Religion
- Affiliation: Buddhist
- Deity: Amida Nyōrai
- Rite: Jōdo-shū
- Status: functional

Location
- Location: 1 Chome-3-32 Shirakawa, Koto City, Tokyo 135-0021
- Country: Japan
- Interactive map of Reigan-ji

Architecture
- Completed: 1624

Reigan-ji (霊巌寺), is a Buddhist temple located in Kōtō-ku, Tokyo, Japan. The temple belongs to the Jōdo-shū sect of Japanese Buddhism and its honzon is a statue of Amida Nyōrai

== History ==
The temple was established in 1624 in Reiganjima, a reclaimed marshland near Nihonbashi by Reigan Shōnin (1554-1641). Reigan Shōnin was the son of a retainer of the Imagawa clan who became a priest at the age of 11. He was noted for his efforts to reconstruct temples around the country which had fallen into ruins, notably in Nara and in Shimōsa Province and Awa Province near Edo. This drew the praise of Shōgun Tokugawa Ieyasu, and under his son, Tokugawa Hidetada, he received permission to build Reigan-ji in Edo. A few years after its completion, it was named one of the Kantō Jūhachi Danrin, one of 18 seminary temples for the Jōdo sect officially recognized by the Tokugawa Shogunate in the Kantō region.

In 1657, much of Edo burned down in the Great fire of Meireki, including Reigan-ji. Some 10,000 people fleeing the flames were killed in and around the precincts. In 1658, the temple was rebuilt, but at its present location as part of the Tokugawa shogunate's urban remodeling plan for Edo. The temple was one of the seven major crematoriums for the city of Edo in the premodern period.

The temple served as the bodaiji for a number of daimyō clans, including the Matsudaira clan of Shirakawa Domain and Imabari Domain and the Honda clan of Zeze Domain.

=== Grave of Matsudaira Sadanobu ===
The grave of rōjū Matsudaira Sadanobu, daimyō of Shirakawa and senior councillor to Shogun Tokugawa Ienari and author of the Kansei Reforms is located at Reigan-ji. The grave was designated a National Historic Site in 1928.

== Gallery ==
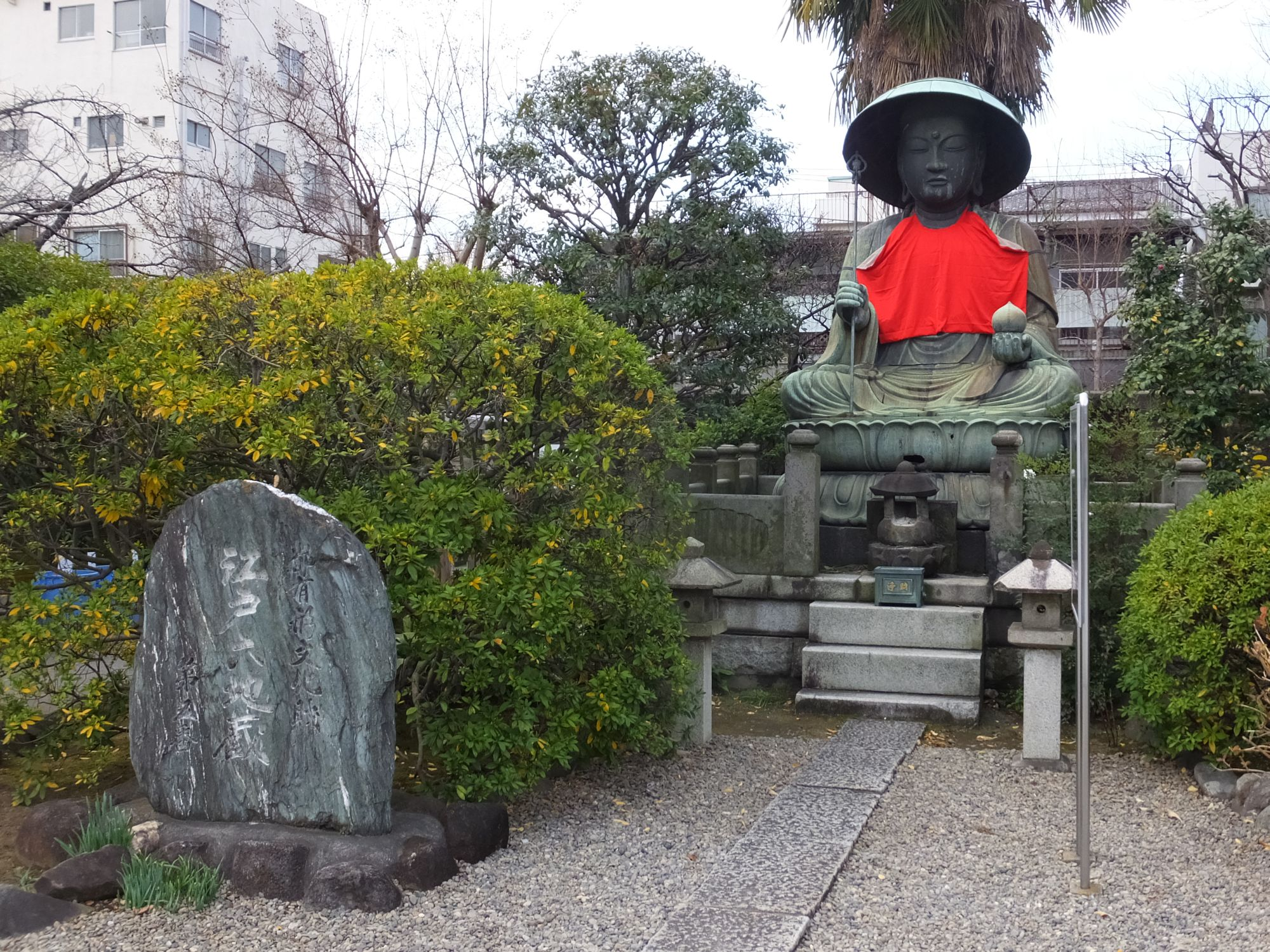
Seated bronze Jizo statue, dated 1717, one of the "Edo Six Jizo"

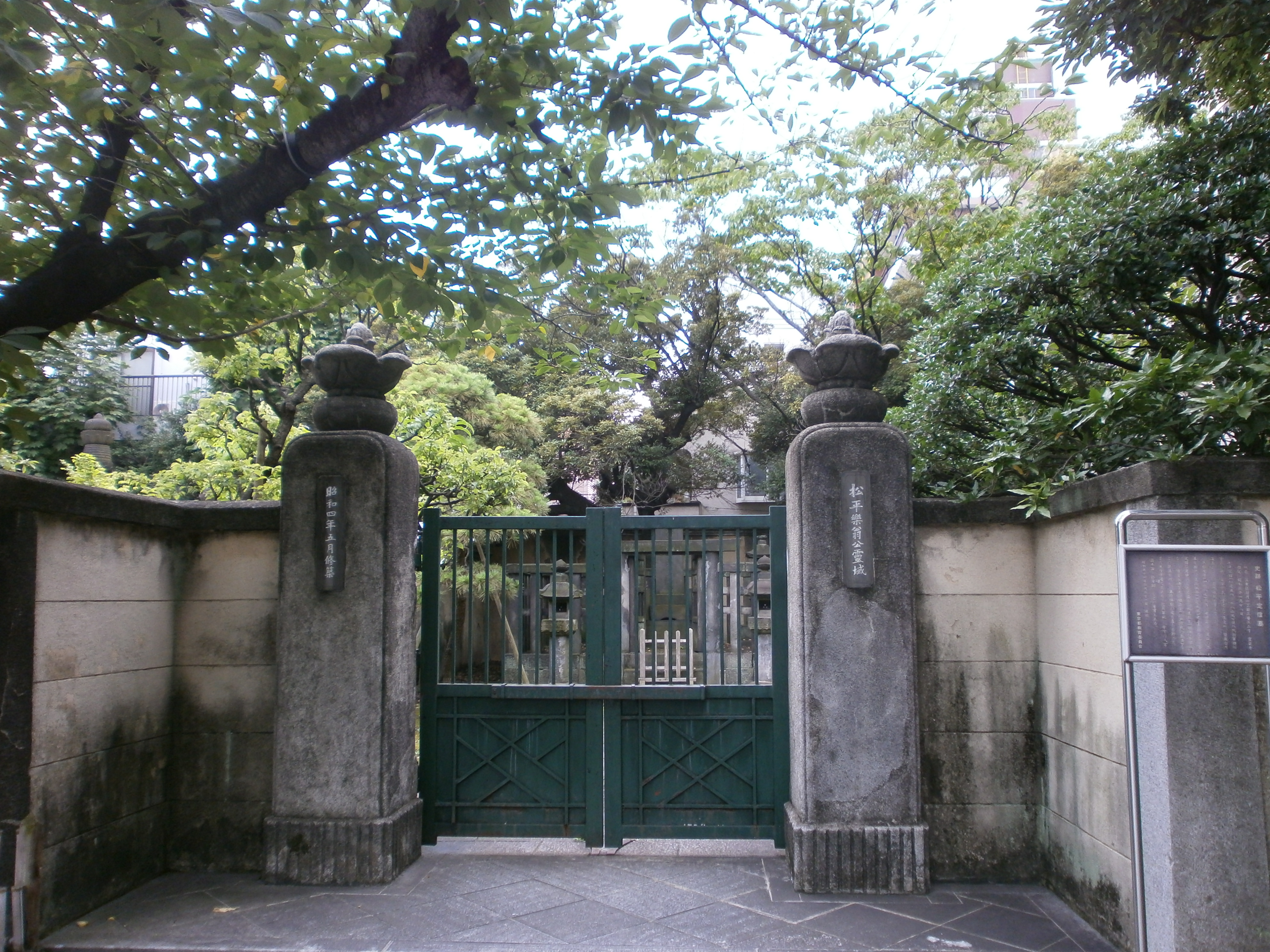
Grave of Matsudaira Sadanobu

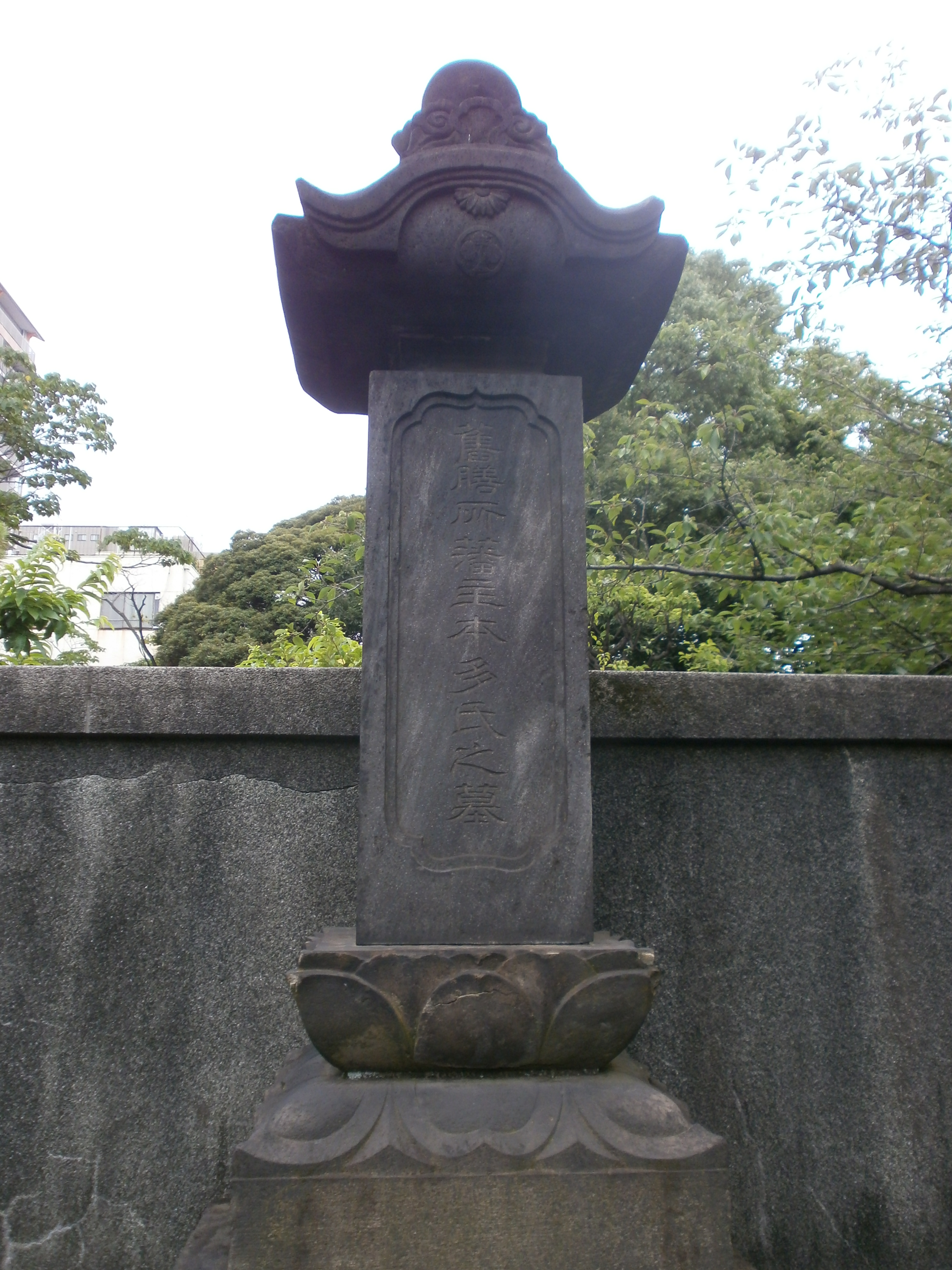
Memorial monument of the Honda daimyō of Zeze Domain

== See also ==
- List of Historic Sites of Japan (Tōkyō)
