= Shimofuda Site =

Historic ruins in Tokyo, Japan

Shimofuda ruins
- 下布田遺跡 (Japanese)
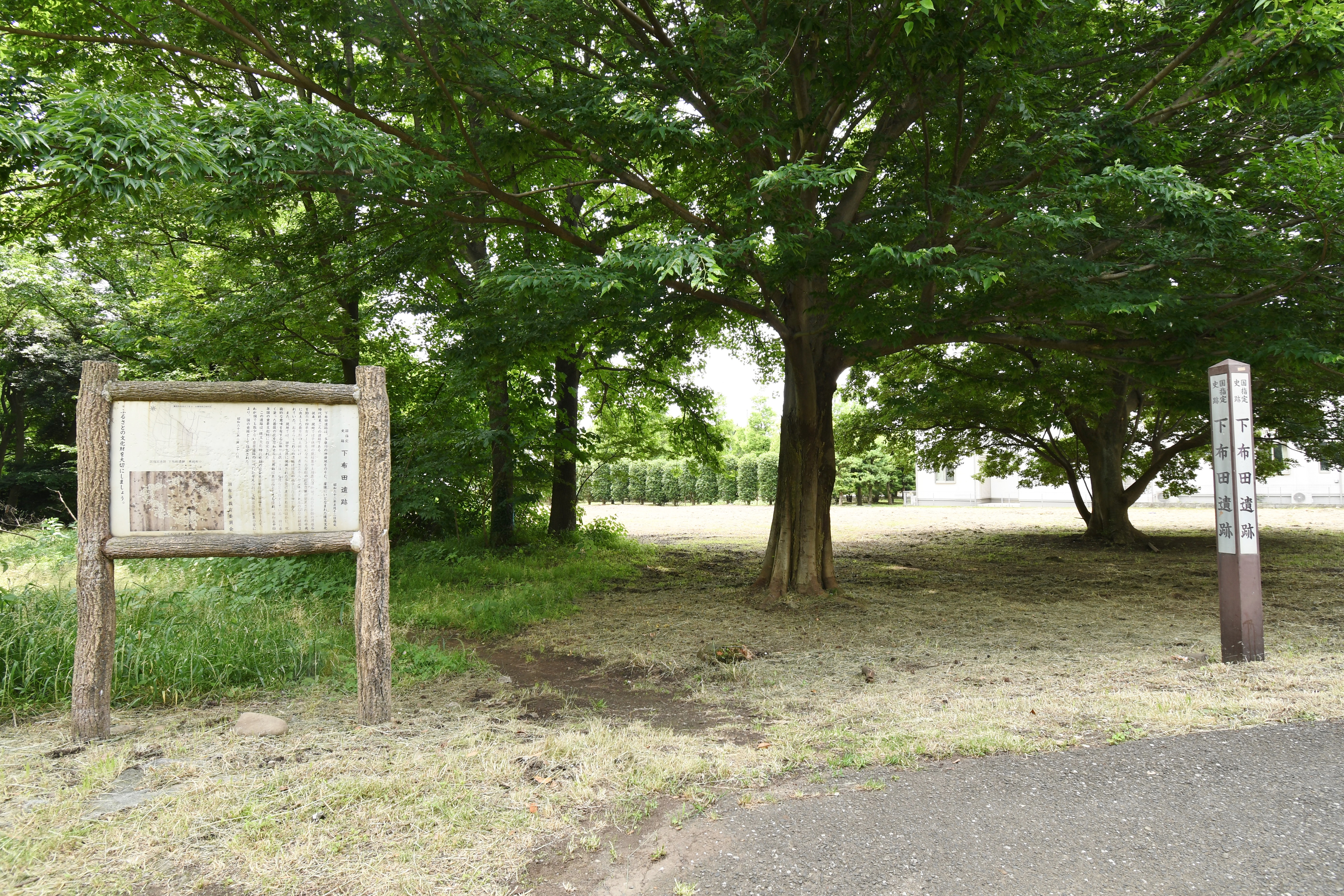

- Shimofuda ruins Shimofuda Site (Japan)
- 35°38′39″N 139°32′56″E
- Type: settlement
- Periods: Jōmon period
- Location: Chōfu, Tokyo, Japan
- Region: Kantō region

Site notes
- Area: 12,000 m^{2} (130,000 sq ft)
- Public access: Yes (no facilities)

The Shimofuda ruins (下布田遺跡, Shimofuda iseki) is an archaeological site containing the ruins of a late Jōmon period settlement located in what is now the Fudai neighborhood of the city of Chōfu, Tokyo Metropolis in the Kantō region of Japan. The site was designated a National Historic Site of Japan in 1987, with the area covered by the designation extended in 2005 and again in 2011 due to additional finds.

== Overview ==
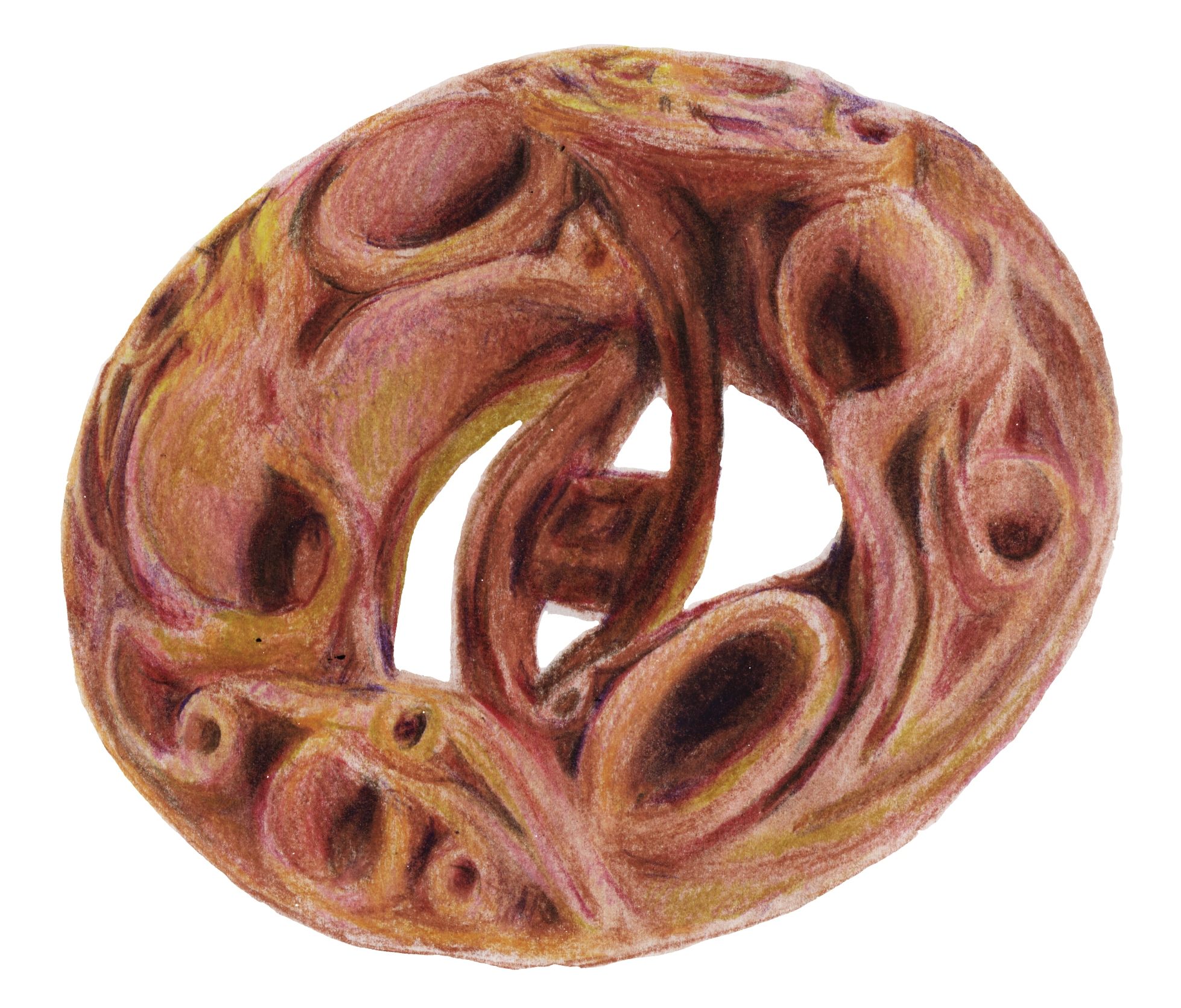
Clay ear ornament from Shimofuda site (ICP)

The Shimofuda ruins is located on a river terrace of the Tama River. The surrounding area was densely populated during the Jōmon period and this is one of several sites forming a settlement belt along the river. The area was formerly heavily wooden and contained several mounds which were previously assumed to have been ancient burial mounds. However, in the course of several archaeological excavations between 1964 and 1971, a pentagonal pit with a major axis of about 1.75 meters and a minor axis of about 1.35 meters and a depth of 9 to 12 centimeters was discovered, containing several phallic-looking stone rods was discovered. This was presumably a ritual site from the late Jōmon period. Another find included a grave area in which 600 river stones the size of a human head had been arranged in a square with each side measuring eight meters. Underneath were numerous burials in jar coffins. Numerous shards of Jōmon pottery, stone swords, stone axes, and spearpoints, clay ritual figurines, and magatama and pottery earrings and other daily objects have also been found at the site. One striking example was an intricate pottery earring shaped like a rose that was subsequently designated a National Important Cultural Property. The Jōmon pottery included example from both the Tōhoku region and the Tōkai region, confirming that trade occurred over relatively long distances during this period. Further excavations were conducted from 1978 to 1982, uncovering a number of wood products as well as animal bones and nuts, indicating the diet of the Jōmon period inhabitants of the settlement.

The site is located in a suburban area and suffers from urban encroachment, but is relatively well preserved and is one of the few known late Jōmon sites in the southern Kantō region.

Some of the artifacts discovered are exhibited in the nearby branch office of Chōfu City Folk Museum. The site, which is now backfilled and is a public park, is about a ten-minute walk from Fuda Station on the Keio Line.

== See also ==
- List of Historic Sites of Japan (Tōkyō)
