= Kamenokoyama Kofun =

Burial mound in Tokyo

- 亀甲山古墳 (Japanese)
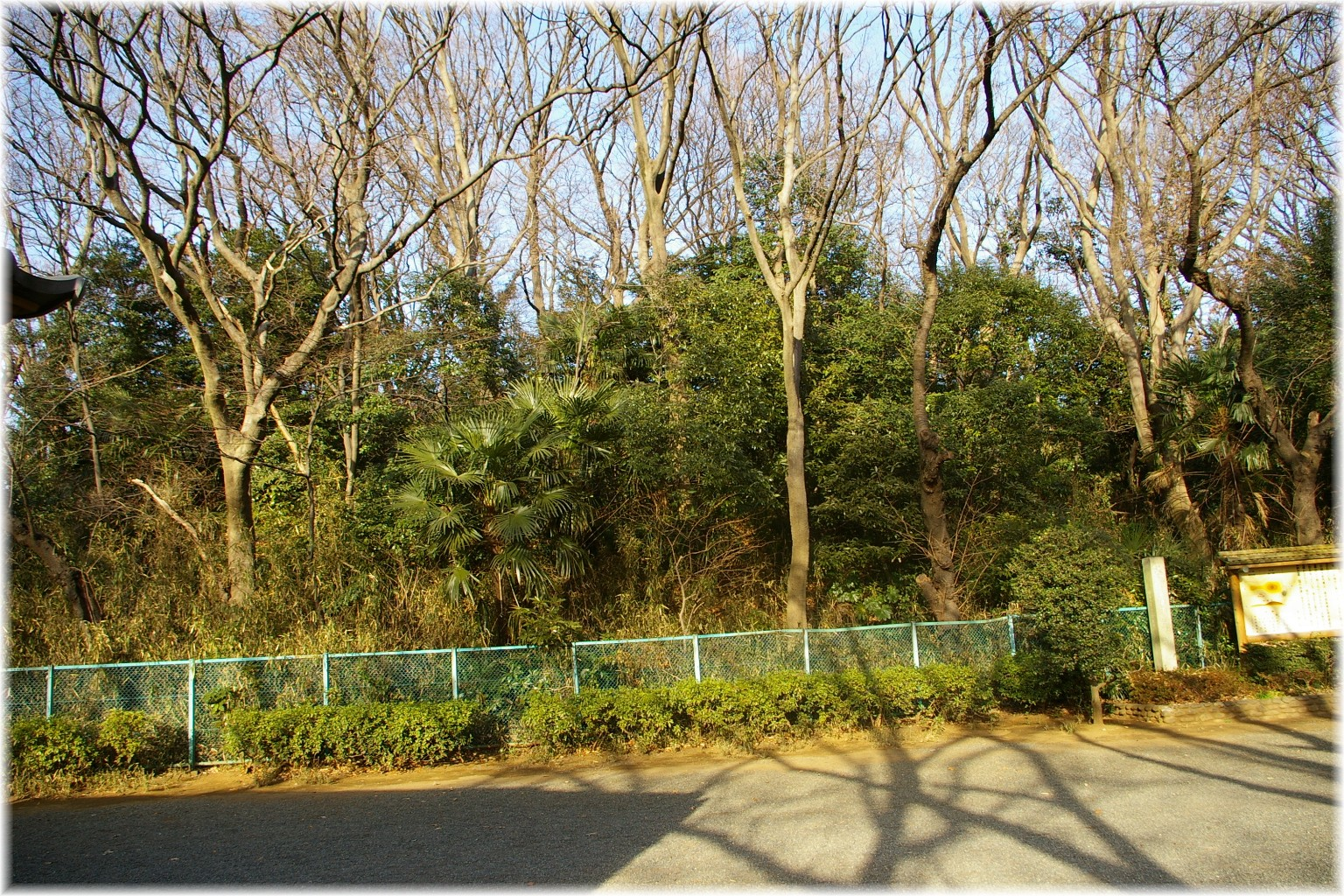
- Kamenokoyama Kofun

- Kamenokoyama Kofun Kamenokoyama Kofun (Japan)
- 35°35′31″N 139°40′02″E
- Type: kofun
- Periods: Kofun period
- Location: Ōta, Tokyo, Japan
- Region: Kantō region

History
- Built: late 4th to early 5th century AD

Site notes
- Public access: Yes

Kamenokoyama Kofun (亀甲山古墳) is a Kofun period burial mound located in the Den-en-chōfu neighborhood of Ōta, Tokyo in the Kantō region of Japan. It is one of 54 kofun in the Ebaradai kofun cluster along the banks of the Tama River, and received protection as a National Historic Site in 1928.

== Overview ==
The Kamenokoyama Kofun is a zenpō-kōen-fun (前方後円墳), which is shaped like a keyhole, having one square end and one circular end, when viewed from above. It is located on the left bank of the lower reaches of the Tama River in the southwestern part of the Musashino Terrace in southern Tokyo within the grounds of Tamagawadai Park. Although the southern end of the posterior circular mound has been flattened due to the construction of a water purification plant, the tumulus remains well preserved. However, no archaeological excavation has been conducted.

The tumulus is orientated to the northwest, and has a total length of 107.25 meters, which is the largest in the Tama River basin. The mound was built in two tiers. Neither fukiishi nor haniwa have been found. It is estimated that the tumulus was made in the middle of the Kofun period from the end of the 4th century to the early 5th century AD.

Overall length
107.25 meters
Posterior circular portion
66 meter diameter x 10 meter high
Anterior rectangular portion
49.5 meters wide x 7 meters high

The Kamenokoyama Kofun is about a 5-minute walk from Tamagawa Station on the Tōkyū Tōyoko Line.

== See also ==
- List of Historic Sites of Japan (Tōkyō)
