= Kobotoke Barrier =

- 小仏関跡 (Japanese)
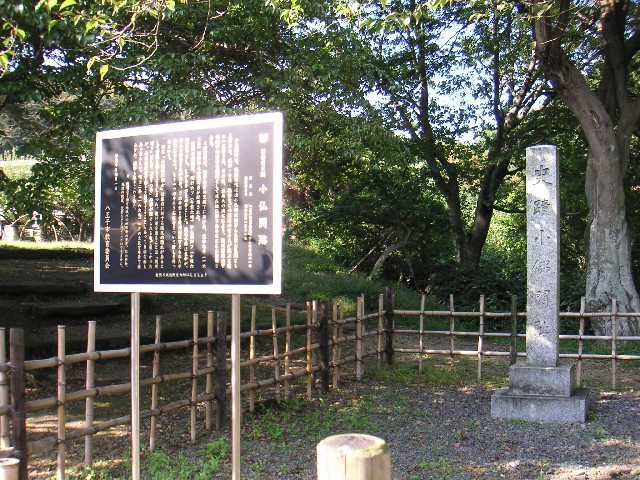

- Kobotoke Barrier Kobotoke Barrier (Japan)
- 35°38′30″N 139°15′58″E
- Periods: Edo period
- Location: Hachiōji, Tokyo, Japan
- Region: Kantō region

Site notes
- Public access: Yes

The Kobotoke Barrier (小仏関跡, Kobotoke seki ato) was a checkpoint operated by the Tokugawa Shogunate in Edo period Japan to control travel on the Kōshū Kaidō highway in what is now the city of Hachiōji, Tokyo in the Kantō region of Japan. It received protection as a National Historic Site in 1933.

== Overview ==
The Kobotoke Barrier is located on the Kōshū Kaidō highway which linked Edo with Kai Province. This was one of the Edo Five Routes and was an important highway used by many daimyō of central Honshu to make their sankin-kōtai processions to the Shogun's court. The checkpoint was situated at the border of Musashi and Sagami at the Kobotoke Pass on Mount Takao.

A barrier was erected in this location during the Sengoku period by Hojo Ujiteru at some point between the Tenshō and Bunroku eras (1573-1592) as part of his defenses against the powerful and aggressive Takeda clan in neighboring Kai Province. Following the establishment of the Tokugawa shogunate, the checkpoint was maintained as part of the outer defenses of the shogun's capital of Edo. The shogunate viewed all forms of travel with suspicion, and also enforced a policy of “no guns in / no women out” for the city of Edo. As with other checkpoints, such as the Hakone Barrier, the barrier consisted of a pair of gates to the east and west, with a building in between for inspectors to check travelers for their identify and travel permits and to examine their belongings for contraband of taxable goods.

The barrier was abolished in 1869 after the Meiji restoration, and after 1888 the route of the Kōshū Kaidō was shifted to the present route of modern Japan National Route 20 to avoid the steep pass. The checkpoint building has been demolished, but its foundations, and the stones on which travelers placed their hands while waiting for inspection remain.

== See also ==
- List of Historic Sites of Japan (Tōkyō)
