= Tokiwa Bridge =

Tokiwabashi 常盤橋
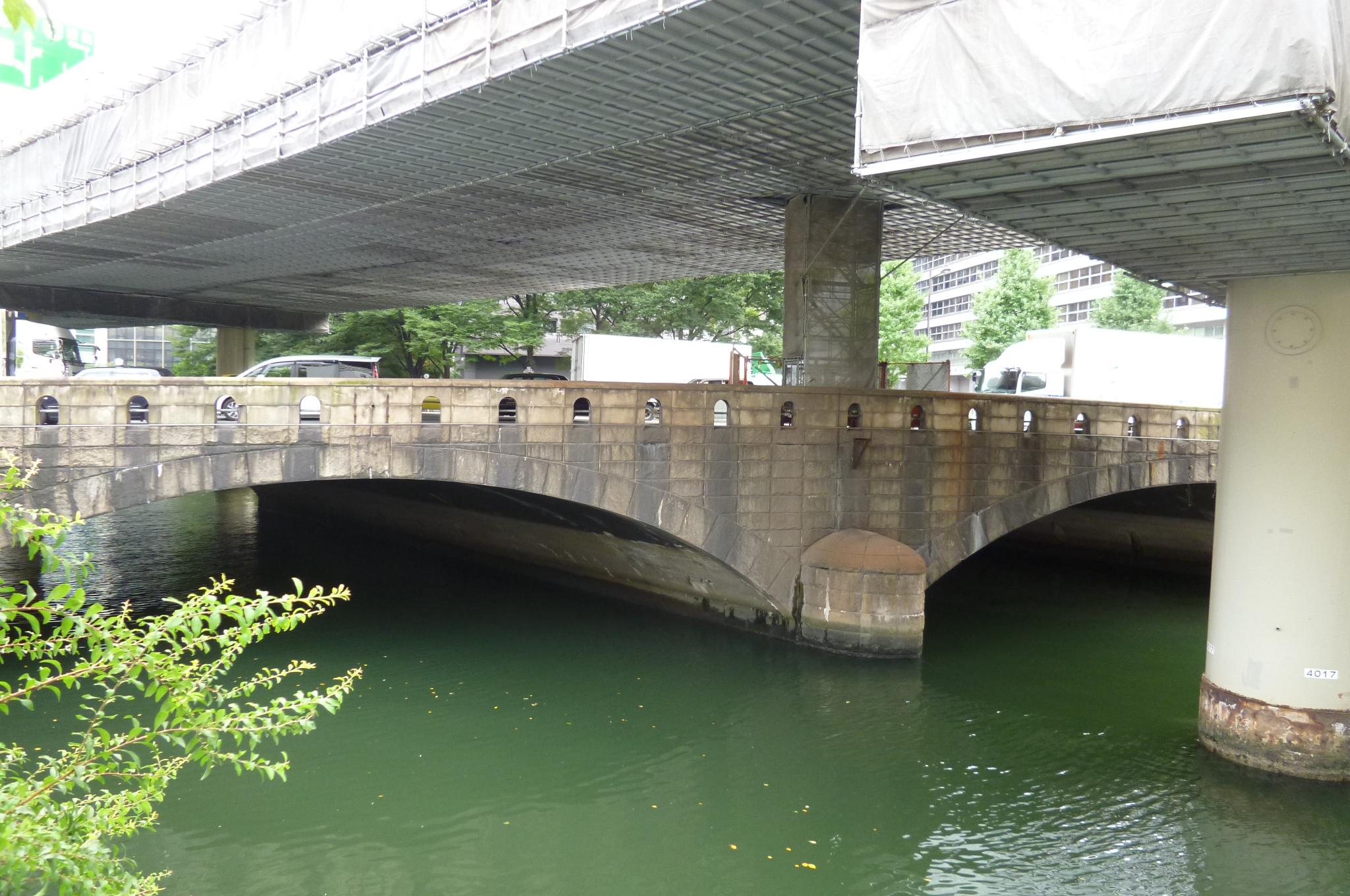
- Tokiwabashi
- Coordinates: 35°41′10″N 139°46′13″E
- Crosses: Nihonbashi River
- Locale: Chiyoda, Tokyo and Chūō, Tokyo, Japan
- Heritage status: National Historic Site of Japan

Characteristics
- Material: Stone

History
- Opened: 1877
- Rebuilt: 1926

The Tokiwabridge (常盤橋) is a bridge over the Nihonbashi River between Ōtemachi, Chiyoda, Tokyo and Nihonbashi Motoishi-chō, Chūō, Tokyo. There are actually two separate "Tokiwa Bridges": a pedestrian-only stone bridge which led to a gate of Edo Castle and a road bridge constructed after the 1923 Great Kanto Earthquake located 70 meters away. Both of these bridges are made from stone, have a double arch structure.

== Overview ==
The origins of the Tokiwabashi are uncertain. In Muromachi period documents, a bridge over the Kanda River is mentioned in this location from the time that Ōta Dōkan first constructed Edo Castle. In any event, after the complete reconstruction of Edo Castle and its associated jōkamachi by Tokugawa Ieyasu, the road from Edo Castle crossing the Tokiwabashi led to the Ōshū Kaidō, the primary highway between Edo and the northern provinces. The bridge went by many names. It was originally called "Ōhashi", and was the location of a famous sword market. The market was so popular that the selling of counterfeit swords proliferated, leading to the term "Ōhashi-mono" as a pejorative for "fake". The bridge was also called the "Asakusaguchi Bridge" because it was built on Honmachi-dōri, which directly connected to the entertainment district of Asakusa. The name "Tokiwabashi" appears from after 1629, and may have been coined by Shōgun Tokugawa Iemitsu from a poem in the Kin'yō Wakashū, although several other theories exist.

The bridge led directly to the Tokiwabashi Gate, one of the five main entrances to Edo Castle (along with the Tayasu Gate, Kandabashi Gate, Hanzomon Gate, and Outer Sakurada Gate). The Tokiwabashi Gate was a masugata-style gate, consisting two gates set at a square angle, one giving access to the castle and one facing the outside, with a courtyard in-between. The gate was built with stone walls, and had a yagura watchtower, from which defenders could either fight outwards against attackers on the bridge, or inward, or any attackers who had managed to penetrate the outer gate and gain access to the courtyard. The bridge itself was a wooden structure, and was destroyed and rebuilt several times due to the various disasters which struck Edo (including fires in 1657 and 1806, earthquakes in 1703, 1849 and 1855).

After the Meiji Restoration, in 1873, the yagura tower was pulled down, leaving only the stone walls. In 1877, parts of the stone wall was pulled down, with the stones reused to construct a double-arched stone bridge by masons from Kyushu. It is the only survivor of more than ten stone bridges which were built in the early Meiji era. Following the damage caused by the 1923 Great Kantō Earthquake, the reconstruction plan for Tokyo called for wider roads. This resulted in more of the remaining stone walls from the site of the Tokiwabashi Gate being destroyed, and the Tokiwabashi itself being reconstructed in 1926 a short distance from its original location and widened to handle automotive traffic.

The ruins of the Tokiwabashi Gate were designated a National Historic Site in 1928.

The bridge suffered from considerable structural damage during the 2011 Tōhoku earthquake and was extensively repaired from 2011 to 2013.

== Gallery ==
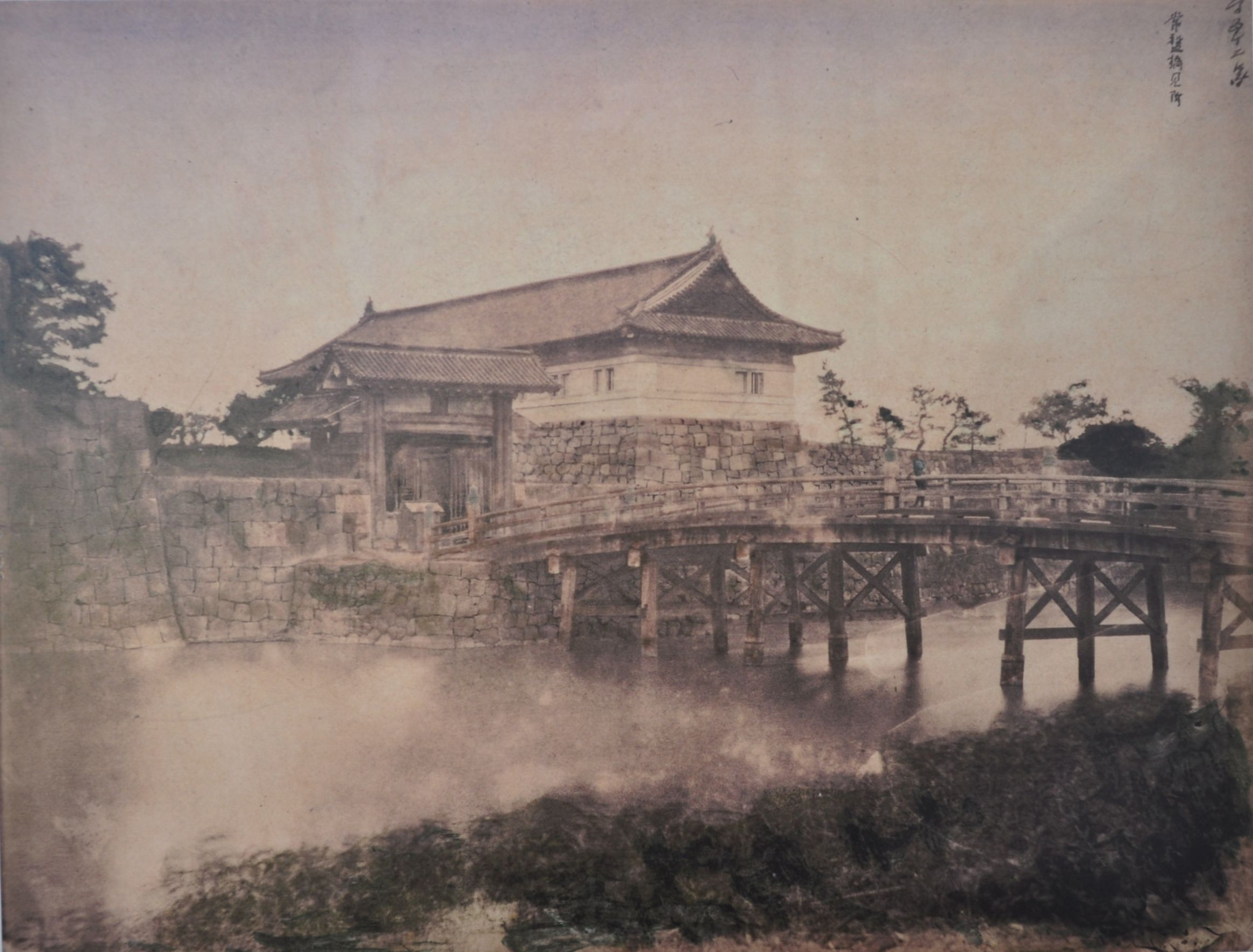
Tokiwabashi Gate (pre-1873)

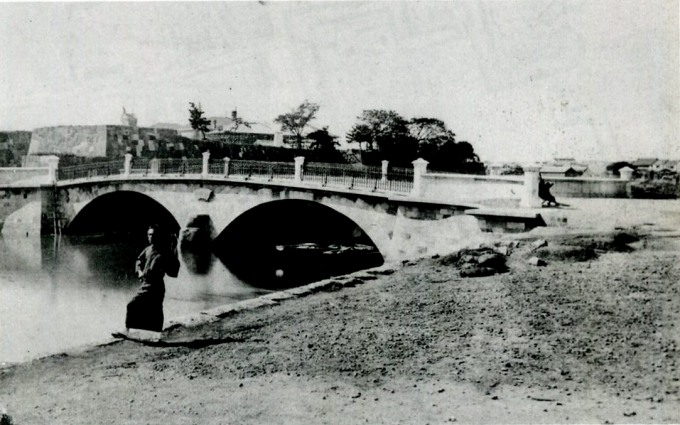
Tokiwa Bridge in 1880

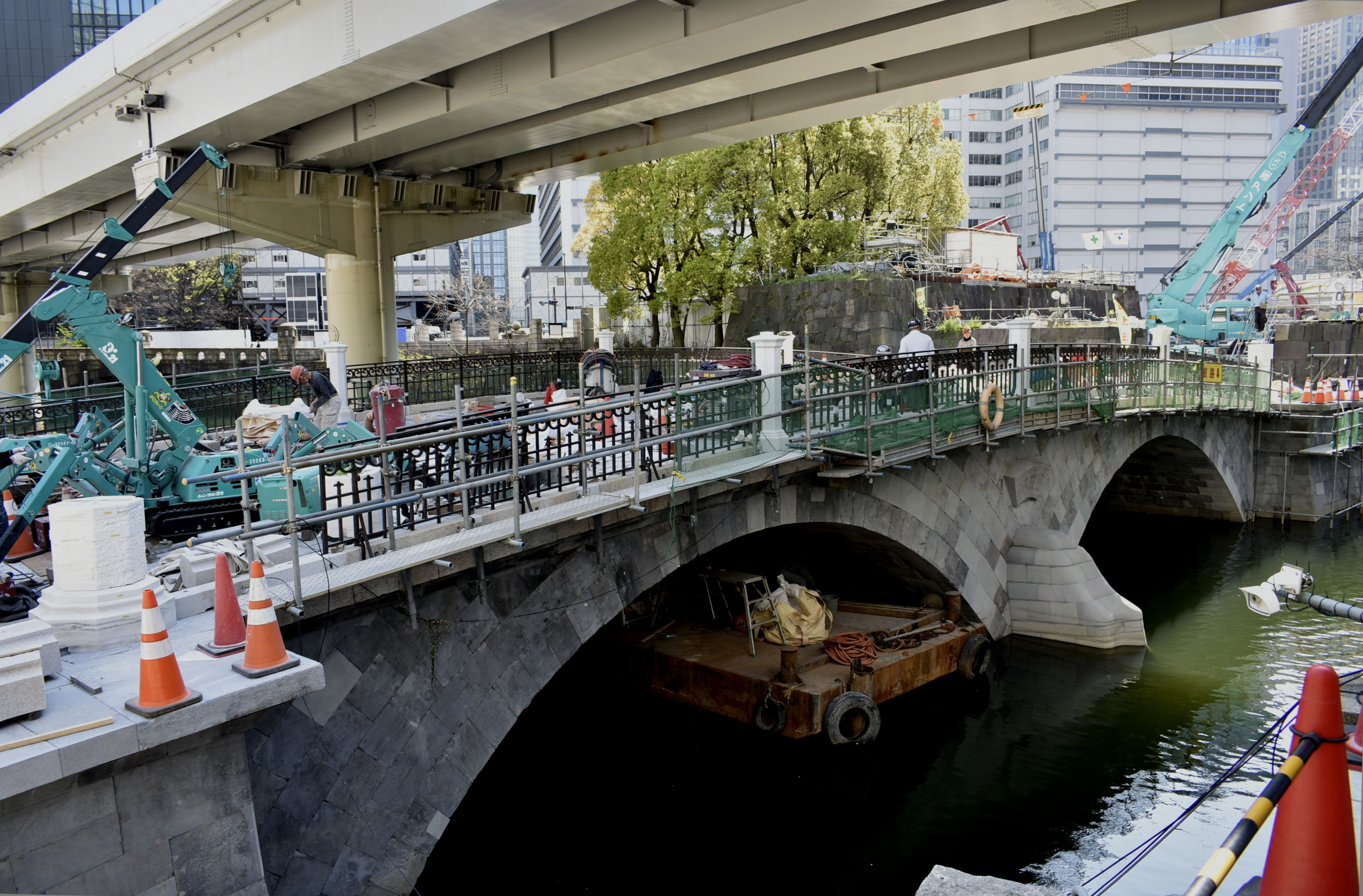
Tokiwa Bridge in 2004

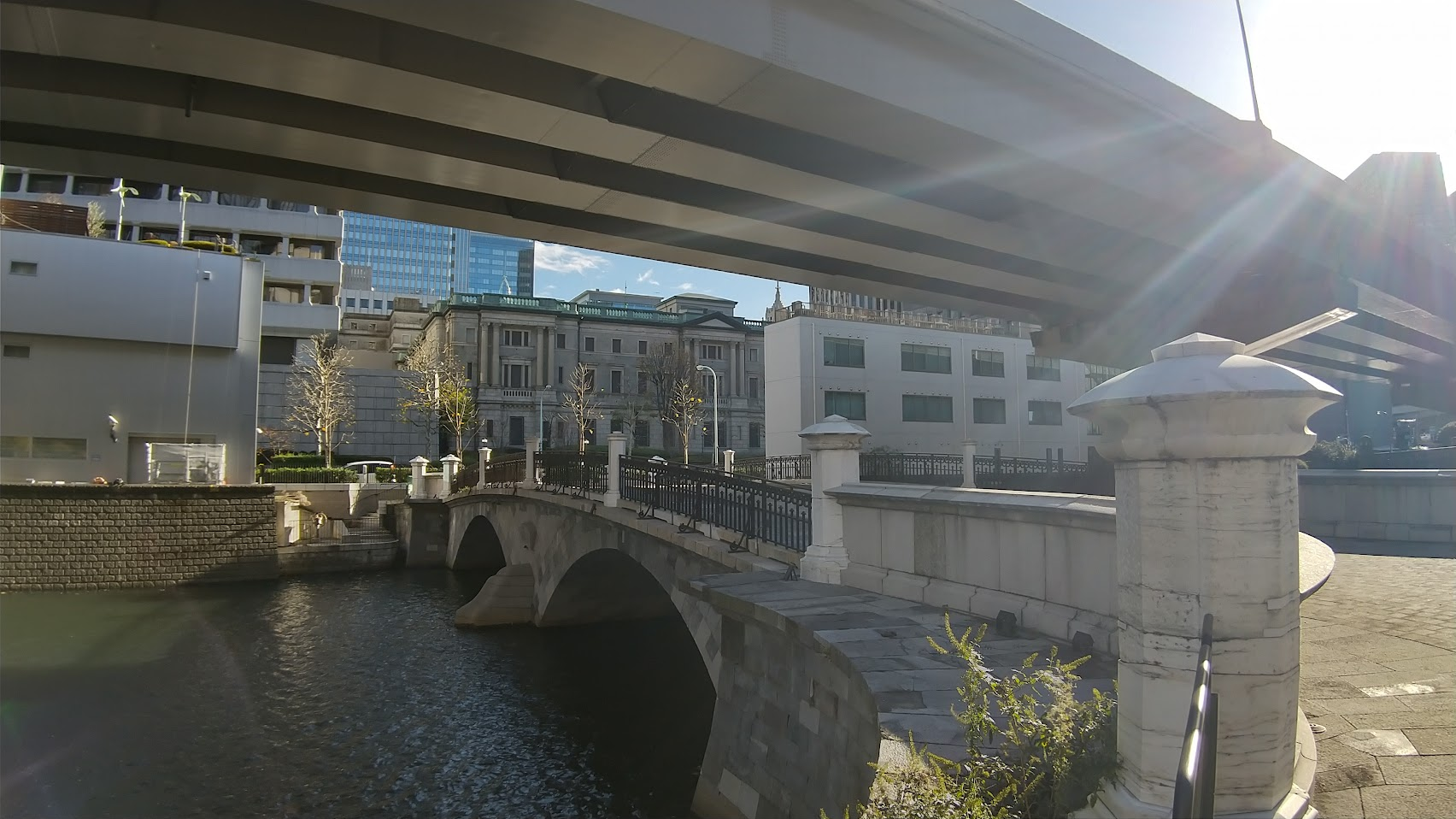
Tokiwa Bridge in 2023 (leading to the Bank of Japan)

== See also ==
- List of Historic Sites of Japan (Tōkyō)
