= Makino Memorial Garden =

Memorial garden in Japan

Makino Memorial Garden 牧野記念庭園
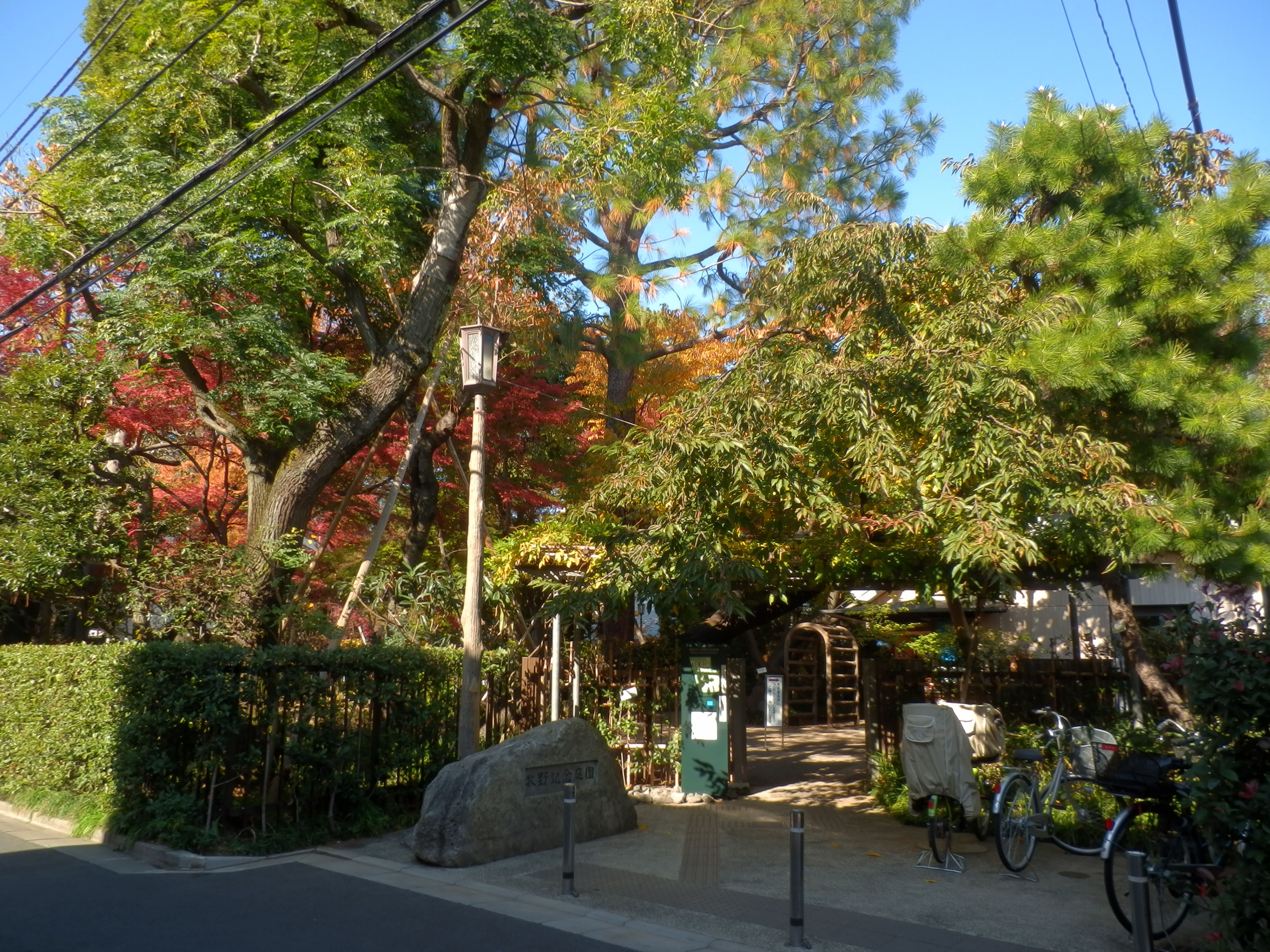
- Entrance to the garden
- Interactive map of Makino Memorial Garden 牧野記念庭園
- Location: 6-34-4, Higashiōizumi, Nerima, Tokyo, Japan
- Coordinates: 35°44′47″N 139°35′8″E
- Opened: 1958
- Website: Homepage (jp)

Makino Memorial Garden (牧野記念庭園, Makino Kinen Teien) is located in Nerima, Tokyo, Japan and dedicated to the life and works of Makino Tomitarō, "Father of Japanese Botany".

== History ==
Makino Memorial Garden opened in 1958 on the site of Makino's former residence, where he lived from 1926 until his death in 1957. The gardens were closed for renovation in 2008 and reopened in 2010. In 2009 the gardens were registered as an Historic Site and Place of Scenic Beauty.

== Gardens ==
The gardens contain over three hundred varieties of plants and trees, including the rare Sueko-zasa (bamboo), Sendaiya-zakura (cherry), and Heranoki. There are also seasonal plantings and a museum. They have an area of 2,576 square metres.

== See also ==
- Parks and gardens in Tokyo
- Makino Botanical Garden
