= Kōgasaka Stone Age Site =

Archaeological site in Japan

Kōgasaka Stone age ruins
- 高ヶ坂石器時代遺跡 (Japanese)
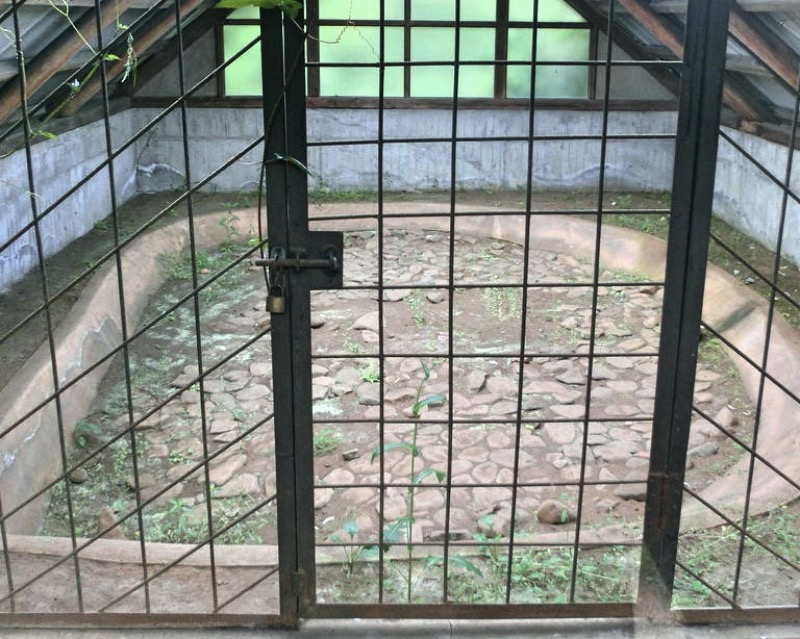
- flagstone floor of pit dwelling at Kōgasaka Stone Age Site

- Kōgasaka Stone age ruins Kōgasaka Stone Age Site (Japan)
- 35°32′43″N 139°27′26″E
- Type: settlement trace
- Periods: middle Jōmon period
- Location: Machida, Tokyo, Japan
- Region: Kantō region

Site notes
- Public access: Yes

Kōgasaka Stone Age Site (高ヶ坂石器時代遺跡, Kōgasaka sekki-jidai iseki) is the collective name for three middle Jōmon period settlement traces located in the Kōgasaka neighborhood of the city of Machida, Tokyo in the Kantō region of Japan. It received protection as a National Historic Site in 1926. The designation was modified in 2009.

== Overview ==
The Kōgasaka Stone Age Site is located on a low river terrace of the Onda River, upstream of the Tsurumi River, and originally consisted of three separate sites: the Rōba Site (牢場遺跡, Rōba iseki), Inariyama Site (稲荷山遺跡, Inariyama iseki) and the Hachimandaira site (八幡平遺跡, Hachimandaira iseki). At each location, the ruins of a pit dwelling with a flagstone floor dating from the middle Jōmon period was discovered in 1918. This was the first instance of flagstone floors being discovered in the Kantō region, and led to the National Historic Site designation in 1926.

At present, only the Rōba Site survives and is open to the public. The dwelling has a slightly oblong shape, with a major axis of 5 meters and a minor axis of 3.5 meters. The remains are now preserved under a small building which was built in 2017 and can be viewed through a glass cover.

The Inariyama site was located about 27 meters southwest of the Rōba site and was partially destroyed in road construction. Currently, it is backfilled, and the actual remains cannot be seen, but the appearance of the remains is reproduced on a placard.

The Hachimantai site is located on a plateau about 800 meters north of both sites. At the Hachimantai site, the dwelling had a circular plan with a diameter of 3.45 meters. It was backfilled after a complete excavation in 1968. The site is not open to the public, but Machida City has plants to develop the area into an archaeological park in the future.

The Rōba ruins are about a 13-minute walk from Machida Station on the Odakyu Electric Railway Odawara Line.

== See also ==
- List of Historic Sites of Japan (Tōkyō)
