= Banzuiin Chōbē =

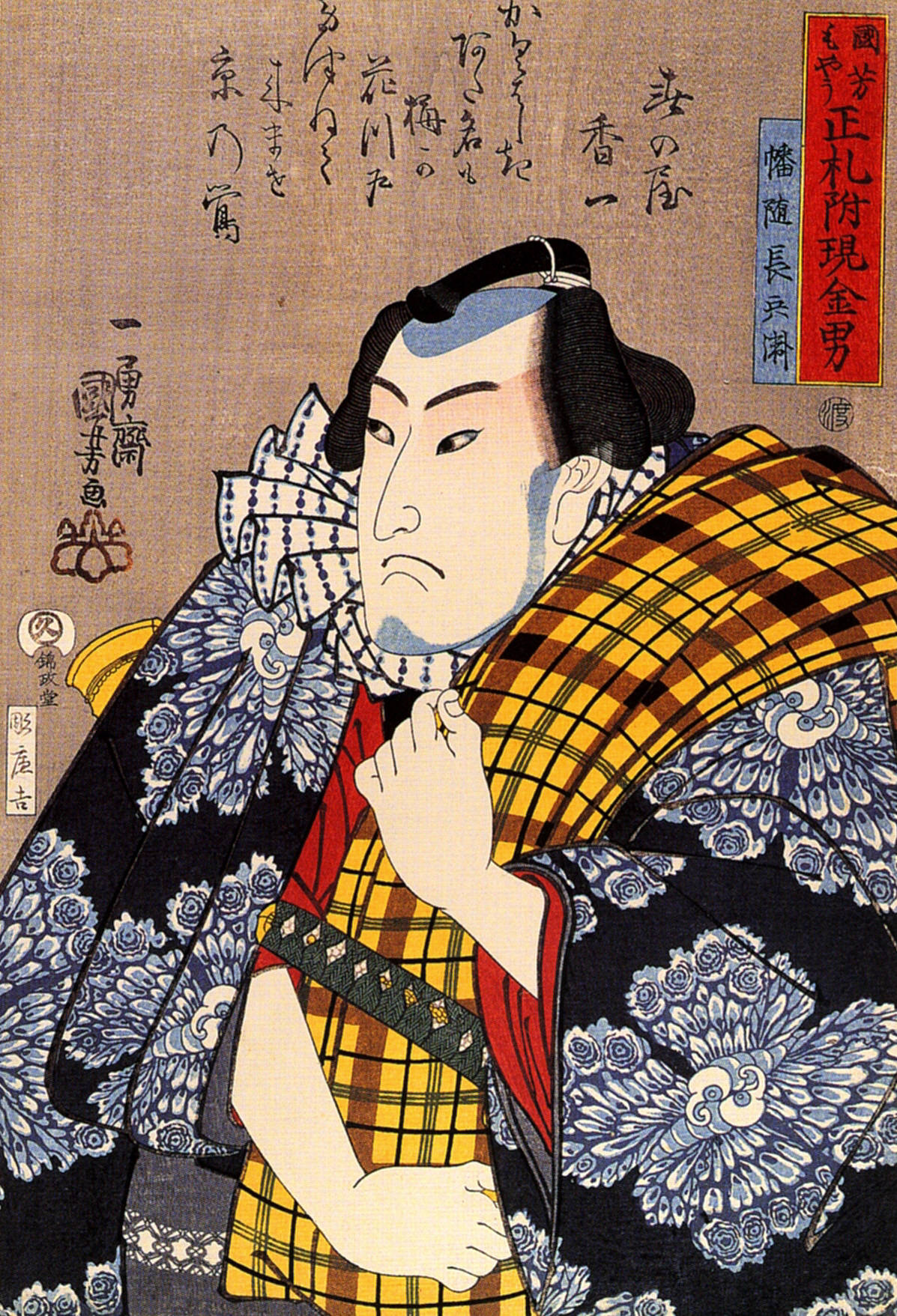
Portrait of Banzuiin Chōbē.

Banzuiin Chōbē (幡随院長兵衛; Japanese pronunciation: [ban.dzɯꜜi.iɲ | tɕoꜜː.beː, -dzɯi.iɲ (|)-], 1622–1657) was a historical street tough of Japan's Edo period who, according to later fictionalized portrayals of his life in literature and drama, fought against injustices, and to protect the common people from the abuses of the samurai aristocracy. Born in Karatsu as Tsukamoto Itarō (塚本伊太郎), he established himself in the Asakusa district of Edo, where he led of a band of machi-yakko and founded an employment agency for rōnin. Trained as a warrior, he was renowned for his swordsmanship.

In Asakusa, Chōbē organized a kumi (group or gang) which opposed the hatamoto-yakko in seeking to control the area's markets. He was eventually killed by hatamoto Mizuno Jūrozaemon.

Following his death, Chōbē became a popular figure in literature and drama. A 1974 prime-time television jidaigeki series, Banzuiin Chōbē Omachi Nasē (幡随院長兵衛 お待ちなせぇ), starred Mikijirō Hira as Chōbē. He was also portrayed by the famous motion picture actor Tsumasaburô Bandô in the 1951 film Oedo go-nin otoko.

== Bibliography ==
Media related to Banzuiin Chōbei at Wikimedia Commons

- Frédéric, Louis. "Banzuiin Chōbei." Japan Encyclopedia. Cambridge: Harvard University Press, 2002.
- Sansom, George. A History of Japan: 1615-1867. Stanford: Stanford University Press, 1963.
