= List of museums in Tokyo =

The following is a list of museums and art galleries in Tokyo.

Museum Name	Image	District or Ward	Type	Summary
Ad Museum Tokyo		Minato	Advertising	Japanese museum dedicated to the promotion of studies in advertising
Amuse Museum		Asakusa	Textile Art	Japanese Textile Culture and Ukiyo-e Art Museum
Ancient Orient Museum		Ikebukuro	Art	Artifacts of the ancient Near East and Central Asia
Artizon Museum		Chūō	Art	Includes Impressionists, Post-Impressionists and twentieth-century art, Ancient Greek ceramics
Asakura Museum of Sculpture		Taitō	Art	Museum preserving the home and studio of sculptor Fumio Asakura (1883-1964)
Banknote and Postage Stamp Museum		Shinjuku	Numismatic	website in Japanese, information
Bicycle Culture Center		Chiyoda	Transport	website
Bunkamura		Shibuya	Art	Concert hall, theater and art gallery
Bunka Gakuen Costume Museum		Shibuya	Fashion	website, historical costumes and costume-related crafts from around the world
Bunkyo Museum		Bunkyō	History	website in Japanese, local history and culture
Center of the Tokyo Raids and War Damage		Koto	History	Information and artifacts regarding the bombing of Tokyo
Currency Museum of the Bank of Japan		Chūō	Numismatic	Japanese currency
Daimaru Museum		Chiyoda	Art	website in Japanese, information
Daimyo Clock Museum		Taitō	Horology	information, information, website in Japanese
Earthquake Learning Center		Meguro	Science	information, information
Edo-Tokyo Museum		Ryōgoku	History	History of Tokyo
Edo-Tokyo Open Air Architectural Museum		Koganei	Open air	Historic Japanese buildings.
Eisei Bunko Museum		Bunkyō	Art	Fine art and historical documents
Emperor Showa Memorial Museum		Tachikawa	Biographical	website, located in Showa Memorial Park (also known as Showa Kinen Park), life and memorabilia of Emperor Hirohito and his wife Empress Kōjun
Exhibition Hall of the Diplomatic Archives of the Ministry of Foreign Affairs of Japan		Minato-ku	Diplomatic archives	Museum website
Fukagawa Edo Museum		Kōtō	History	information, miniature reproduction of downtown Edo
Gas Science Museum, Tokyo		Kodaira	Industry	website in Japanese, information, information, gas appliances and technology
Ghibli Museum		Mitaka	Art	Animation work of Hayao Miyazaki and Studio Ghibli
Gotoh Museum		Setagaya	Art	Classical Japanese and Chinese art
Hara Museum of Contemporary Art		Shinagawa	Art	Closed - Media includes art, design, architecture, music and dance
Hanzomon Museum		Ichibanchō, Chiyoda, Tokyo	Art	
Hasegawa Machiko Art Museum		Setagaya	Art	Comic strip works by Hasegawa Machiko, who drew the comic strip Sazae-san
Hatakeyama Memorial Museum of Fine Art		Minato	Art	Chinese, Korean and Japanese art related to tea drinking
House of Shiseido		Chūō	Fashion	website, information, history of Shiseido cosmetic products
Ichiyo Memorial Museum		Taito, Tokyo	Literature	
Idemitsu Museum of Arts		Marunouchi	Art	Features a collection of Japanese painting and calligraphy, and East Asian ceramics; Currently closed for renovations.
Industrial Safety Museum & Theater		Minato	Industry	website
Itabashi Ward Public Ecopolis Center		Marunouchi	Science	information
JAXA i		Chiyoda	Science	website, aerospace science, operated by the Japan Aerospace Exploration Agency
Japan Football Museum		Bunkyō	Sports	website, information, soccer in Japan
Japanese Baseball Hall of Fame		Bunkyō	Sports	
Japanese Folk Crafts Museum		Meguro	Art	Also known as Mingeikan Museum, Japanese folk crafts and from China, Korea, England, Africa and elsewhere
Japanese Sword Museum		Shibuya	Military	Art of Japanese sword
JCII Camera Museum		Chiyoda	Technology	website, cameras, photography and film
Kanto Earthquake Disaster Memorial Museum		Sumida	History	information
Katsushika City Museum		Katsushika	Science	website, also local history and astronomy
Katsushika Shibamata Tora-san Museum		Katsushika	History	information,
Kinunomichi Museum		Hachiōji	History	information in Japanese, video, history of the silk trade and silk road
Kite Museum (Tokyo)		Chūō	Sports	website, Japanese and Asian kites
Kobo Gallery		Chūō	Art	
Kodansha Noma Memorial Museum		Bunkyō	Art	Art and cultural treasures; currently closed for renovations
Kodaira Hirakushi Denchu Art Museum		Kodaira	Art	Home, studio, and gallery of sculptor Hirakushi Denchū (1872-1979)
Koishikawa Annex, The University Museum, The University of Tokyo		Bunkyō	Natural history	Research museum only
Kokugakuin University Museum		Shibuya	Shinto, History, Archaeology	This Museum was founded with the goals of gathering and preserving cultural artifacts necessary to the study of Japanese culture, conducting and publicizing research, and engaging in collaborative educational and research activities within the context of Kokugakuin University and beyond. The permanent exhibition includes exhibits detailing the history of the university and the academic resource archive as well as archaeological research into the history of the Japanese archipelago.
Koishikawa Ukiyo-e Art Museum		Bunkyō	Art	Ukiyo-e paintings
Kyodo no mori		Fuchū	Open air	
Matsuoka Museum of Art		Shirokanedai	Art	website, description of collections
Madame Tussauds Tokyo			Wax	
Marubeni Gallery		Chiyoda	Art	website
Meguro Museum of Art		Meguro	Art	Japanese modern and contemporary art, as well as international artists
Meguro Parasitological Museum		Meguro	Medical	website
Meiji Jingu Treasure Museum		Shibuya	Art	website, items used by household of Emperor Meiji
Meiji University Museum		Chiyoda	Multiple	website in Japanese, information, three departments: handcrafts, criminology, archaeology
Michio Miyagi Memorial Hall		Shinjuku	Music	Life and works of musician Michio Miyagi
Min-On Music Museum		Shinjuku	Music	website in Japanese, information
Miraikan		Odaiba	Science	National Museum of Emerging Science and Innovation
Mitsui Memorial Museum		Chūō	Art	Japanese and Asian art and decorative arts
Mitsuo Aida Museum		Chūō	Art	website, works of calligrapher poet Mitsuo Aida; closed
Mitsubishi Ichigokan Museum		Marunouchi	Art	Focus is 19th-century Western art
Mori Art Museum		Roppongi	Art	Contemporary art
Musée Tomo		Minato	Art	Contemporary Japanese ceramic art
Museum of Advertising and Marketing		Shiodome	Science	website, also known as Advertising Museum Tokyo, history of advertising in Japan
Museum of Contemporary Art Tokyo		Kōtō	Art	In Kiba
Museum of Logistics		Minato	Transportation	website in Japanese, information
Museum of Maritime Science		Odaiba	Maritime	Japanese boats, the Navy, shipping, fishing, sailing, maritime recreation, ship design and building, marine environment
Museum of the Imperial Collections		Chiyoda	Art	Changing exhibition of a part of the imperial household treasures
Nakagawa Funabansho Barge Museum		Koto	History	Replica of the Nakagawa Waterway Station, which regulated trade and travel of Edo-era canals. website, information
NHK Museum of Broadcasting		Minato	Media	website, history of broadcasting in Japan
NTT InterCommunication Center		Shinjuku	Art	Media art
National Art Center		Roppongi	Art	20th-century painting and modern art
National Astronomical Observatory of Japan - Observatory History Museum		Mitaka	Science	Astronomy
National Hansen's Disease Museum		Higashimurayama	Science	History of Hansen's disease (leprosy) in Japan and its effects on its sufferers
National Museum of Modern Art		Chiyoda	Art	
National Museum of Nature and Science		Ueno	Natural history	Natural history and interactive science exhibits
National Museum of Territory and Sovereignty		Toranomon	Territory and Sovereignty	Sovereignty of the Senkaku Islands, Takeshima and the southernmost Kuril Islands.
National Museum of Western Art		Ueno	Art	Art from the Western tradition
National Showa Memorial Museum		Chiyoda	History	Also known as Showakan, lifestyle of the Japanese people during the Shōwa period, mostly during and post World War II, located in Kudanshita
Nezu Museum		Minato	Art	Japanese and other Asian pre-modern arts, including arts related to tea
O Art Museum		Ōsaki	Art	website
Okura Shukokan		Minato	Art	website, Japanese and Asian art
Ota Memorial Museum of Art		Shibuya	Art	Ukiyo-e (Japanese woodblock print)
Orugoru no Chiisana Hakubutsukan		Bunkyō	Music	Mechanical musical instruments (permanently closed); website
Paper Museum		Kita	Industry	website, paper industry, history and uses of paper
Pen Station, Tokyo		Chuo	Writing Instruments	website, history of writing instruments, in particular Pilot pens
Philatelic Museum, Tokyo		Toshima	Philately	website, postage stamps
Prince Chichibu Memorial Sports Museum		Shinjuku	Sports	website
Princess Gallery Handbag Museum		Taitō	Fashion	website in Japanese, information, history of handbags in Japan and bags from around the world
Printing Museum, Tokyo		Bunkyō	Media	History and techniques of printing as a form of communication
Rainbow Sewer Museum		Odaiba	Science	website in Japanese, information, structure of Tokyo's drainage system
Ridai Museum of Modern Science		Shinjuku	Science	information, part of the Tokyo University of Science, history of the University, calculators and computers and Japan
Safety Promotion Center		Ōta	Aerospace	Aviation safety, open by reservation
Science Museum, Tokyo		Chiyoda	Science	website
The Seiko Museum Ginza		Chuo	Horology	website
Sekine Kunen Shodo Museum		Taitō	Art	information, calligraphy
Setagaya Art Museum		Setagaya	Art	
Setagaya Museum of History		Setagaya	History	information, information, local history
Shinjuku Historical Museum		Shinjuku	History	website in Japanese, information, local history
Shitamachi Museum		Ueno	History	Traditional culture of Tokyo's Shitamachi
Shoto Museum of Art		Shibuya	Art	website, local art, paintings, sculpture and craft
Sompo Museum of Art		Shinjuku	Art	website
Space Space Gallery		Komae	Art	website
Suginami Animation Museum		Suginami	Art	website
Suginami Historical Museum		Suginami	History	information, local history and culture
Suginami Science Museum		Suginami	Science	website (in Japanese)
Sugino Costume Museum		Shinagawa	Fashion	website in French
Sumida Heritage Museum		Sumida	History	website in Japanese, information, local history
Sumida Hokusai Museum		Sumida	Art	website
Sumo Museum		Sumida	Sports	website, Sumo
Suntory Museum of Art		Akasaka	Art	website
Tei-Park		Chiyoda	Media	website, information and telecommunications, postal history, insurance
TeNQ		Bunkyo	Science	website, Space museum
TEPCO Electric Energy Museum		Shibuya	Science	website, information, electricity, operated by TEPCO
The History Museum of J-Koreans		Minato	History	website, history of Koreans in Japan
The University Museum, The University of Tokyo		Bunkyo	Natural history, Archeology	Museum of The University of Tokyo. website
Tobacco and Salt Museum		Sumida	Industry	website, uses of tobacco and salt throughout history
Tobu Museum of Transport & Culture		Sumida	Railway	
Toei Animation Gallery		Nerima	Art	information
Toguri Museum		Shibuya	Art	website
Tokyo Fire Museum		Shinjuku	Firefighting	information, website in Japanese
Tokyo Fuji Art Museum		Hachiōji	Art	website, includes paintings, prints, photography, sculpture, ceramics and lacquerware, armor, swords and medallions
Tokyo Hongo Ceramics Museum		Bunkyō	Art	information, history and culture
Tokyo Metropolitan Art Museum		Ueno	Art	
Tokyo Metropolitan Theatre		Toshima	Art	Concert hall with exhibition gallery
Tokyo Metropolitan Museum of Photography		Meguro	Art	
Tokyo Metropolitan Police Museum		Chūō	Law enforcement	information, website in Japanese
Tokyo Metropolitan Teien Art Museum		Minato	Art	Art Deco house with changing exhibits
Tokyo Metropolitan Water Science Museum		Kōtō	Science	information
Tokyo National Museum		Ueno	Art	Art works and archaeological objects of Asia, focusing on Japan
Tokyo Metro Museum		Edogawa	Transportation	Official website
Tokyo Waterworks Historical Museum		Bunkyō	Science	information, information, Tokyo's water supply system
Ueno Royal Museum		Ueno	Art	information, website in Japanese
University Art Museum, Tokyo University of the Arts		Ueno	Art	website
Waseda University Tsubouchi Memorial Theatre Museum		Shinjuku	Theater	History of drama
Watari Museum of Contemporary Art		Shibuya	Art	
Yamatane Museum		Shibuya	Art	nihonga style of Japanese watercolor painting
Yoku Moku Museum		Minato	Art	Ceramics by Picasso
Yūshūkan		Chiyoda	Military	Japanese war casualties and military activity from the start of the Meiji Restoration to the end of the Pacific War
Zoshigaya Missionary Museum		Toshima	Historic house	

== See also ==
- List of museums in Japan

== Resources ==
- Tokyo Tourism Information
- Travel Tokyo
