= List of places of scenic beauty of Japan (Tokyo) =

This list is of the places of scenic beauty of Japan located within the Metropolis of Tōkyō.

== National Places of Scenic Beauty ==
As of 1 January 2021, fourteen Places have been designated at a national level (including three *Special Places of Scenic Beauty).

Site	Municipality	Comments	Image	Coordinates	Type	Ref.
*Hama Rikyū Gardens 旧浜離宮庭園; Kyū-Hama Rikyū teien	Chūō	also a Special Historic Site		35°39′36″N 139°45′48″E	1	
*Koishikawa Kōraku-en 小石川後楽園; Koishikawa Kōraku-en	Bunkyō	also a Special Historic Site		35°42′20″N 139°44′57″E	1	
*Rikugi-en 六義園; Rikugi-en	Bunkyō			35°43′59″N 139°44′47″E	1	
Former Fukagawa Family Gardens 旧古河氏庭園; Kyū-Fukagawa-shi teien	Kita			35°44′34″N 139°44′45″E	1	
Former Shiba Rikyū Gardens 旧芝離宮庭園; Kyū-Shiba Rikyū teien	Minato			35°39′18″N 139°45′31″E	1	
Former Asakura Fumio Family Gardens 旧朝倉文夫氏庭園; Kyū-Asakura Fumio-shi teien	Taitō	Garden inside what is now the Asakura Museum of Sculpture		35°43′37″N 139°46′07″E	1	
Mukōjima Hyakka-en 向島百花園; Mukōjima Hyakka-en	Sumida	also an Historic Site		35°43′27″N 139°48′56″E	1, 8	
Koganei 小金井（サクラ） Koganei (sakura)	Koganei, Kodaira, Nishitōkyō, Musashino			35°42′46″N 139°30′25″E	3	
Koishikawa Botanical Gardens 小石川植物園（御薬園跡及び養生所跡） Koishikawa shokubutsu-en (Oyaku-en ato oyboi Yōjōsho ato)	Bunkyō	also an Historic Site		35°42′29″N 139°45′08″E	1	
Denpō-in Gardens 伝法院庭園; Denpō-in teien	Taitō			35°42′49″N 139°47′42″E	1	
Tonogayato Gardens (Zuigi-en) 殿ヶ谷戸庭園（随冝園） Tonogayato teien (Zuigi-en)	Kokubunji			35°41′56″N 139°28′56″E	1	
Kaitokukan Gardens 懐徳館庭園 (旧加賀藩主前田氏本郷本邸庭園); Kaitokukan teien (kyū-Kaga-han-shu Maeda-shi hongō hontei teien)	Bunkyō	on the campus of the University of Tokyo; formerly part of the residence of the Maeda clan of the Kaga Domain		35°42′31″N 139°45′43″E	1	
Tetsugaku-dō Park 哲学堂公園; Tetsugakudō kōen)	Nakano, Shinjuku			35°43′20″N 139°40′27″E	1	
Former Residence and Garden of Yokoyama Taikan 横山大観旧宅及び庭園; Yokoyama Taikan kyū-taku oyobi teien	Taitō			35°42′44″N 139°46′06″E	1	

== Prefectural Places of Scenic Beauty ==
As of 1 May 2020, twelve Places have been designated at a prefectural level.

Site	Municipality	Comments	Image	Coordinates	Type	Ref.
Former Yasuda Kusuo Residence Gardens 旧安田楠雄邸庭園 kyū-Yasuda Kusuo-tei teien	Bunkyō	property of the Japan National Trust		35°43′37″N 139°45′37″E		
Former Yasuda Gardens 旧安田庭園 kyū-Yasuda teien	Sumida			35°41′54″N 139°47′38″E		
Kiyosumi Gardens 清澄庭園; Kiyosumi teien	Koto			35°40′50″N 139°47′52″E		
Todoriki Valley 等々力渓谷; Todoriki keikoku	Setagaya			35°36′18″N 139°38′45″E		
Mount Mitake 奥御岳景園地; Oku-Mitake keienchi	Ōme, Akiruno			35°46′59″N 139°09′00″E		
Yakushi-ike Park 福王寺旧園地(薬師池公園); Fukuōji kyū-enchi (Yakushi-ike kōen)	Machida			35°34′47″N 139°26′52″E		
Masugata Pond Springs 真姿の池湧水群; Masugata-no-ike yūsuigun	Kokubunji			35°41′36″N 139°28′25″E		
Mitō Great Falls 三頭大滝; Mitō ōtaki	Hinohara			35°44′05″N 139°01′34″E		
Unazawa 4 Falls 海沢の四滝; Unazawa-no-yon-taki	Okutama			35°48′00″N 139°07′10″E		
Senzokuike Park 洗足池公園 senzoku-ike-kōen	Ota			35°36′06″N 139°41′26″E		
Makino Memorial Garden 牧野記念庭園（牧野富太郎宅跡） Makino kinen teien (Makino Tomitarō taku ato)	Nerima	site of the residence of Makino Tomitarō; also a registered Historic Site and Place of Scenic Beauty		35°44′47″N 139°35′07″E		
Daikyō-ji Suikei-en 題経寺邃渓園; Daikyōji suikeien	Katsushika			35°45′30″N 139°52′42″E		

== Municipal Places of Scenic Beauty ==
As of 1 May 2020, three Places have been designated at a municipal level.

== Registered Historic Sites ==
As of 1 January 2021, three Monuments have been registered (as opposed to designated) as Places of Scenic Beauty at the national level.

Site	Municipality	Comments	Image	Coordinates	Type	Ref.
Kikuchi Family Teahouse Gardens 菊池氏茶室（礀(石偏に間)居）庭園; Kikuchi-shi chashitsu teien	Minato			35°39′24″N 139°43′50″E		
National Museum of Western Art Gardens 国立西洋美術館園地; Kokuritsu Seiyō Bijutsukan enchi	Taitō			35°42′54″N 139°46′32″E		
Makino Memorial Garden 牧野記念庭園（牧野富太郎宅跡） Makino kinen teien (Makino Tomitarō taku ato)	Nerima	site of the residence of Makino Tomitarō; also a registered Historic Site		35°44′47″N 139°35′07″E		

== See also ==
- Cultural Property (Japan)
- List of parks and gardens of Tokyo
- List of Historic Sites of Japan (Tokyo)
- Ueno Park
