= Asakura =

Asakura (written: 朝倉, 浅倉, 麻倉) is a Japanese surname. Notable people with the surname include:

== Real people ==
- Asakura clan, famous Japanese clan during Sengoku period
  - Asakura Yoshikage (朝倉 義景; 1533–1573), daimyō
- Daisuke Asakura (浅倉 大介; born 1967), Japanese musician, songwriter and producer
- Fumio Asakura (朝倉 文夫; 1883–1964), Western-style Japanese sculptor
- George Asakura (born 1974), Japanese manga artist
- Kyoko Asakura (朝倉 響子; 1925–2016), Japanese sculptor, daughter of Fumio
- Noriyuki Asakura (朝倉 紀行; born 1954), Japanese composer and vocalist
- Yuu Asakura (麻倉 憂; born 1989), Japanese film actress
- Rae Lil Black(Born Kae Asakura), pornographic actress

== Fictional characters ==
- Kasumi Asakura, of Rose Hip Rose
- Kazumi Asakura, from Negima!: Magister Negi Magi
- Minami Asakura and Toshio Asakura in Touch
- Ryoko Asakura, from the Suzumiya Haruhi series
- Shin Asakura, from Sakamoto Days
- Takeshi Asakura, aka Kamen Rider Ouja, the main villain from the Tokusatsu TV series Kamen Rider Ryuki
- Yoh Asakura, from Shaman King
  Yoh Asakura's relatives:
  - Hao Asakura (older twin brother/Descendant)
  - Keiko Asakura (mother)
  - Kino Asakura (grandmother)
  - Mikihisa Asakura (father)
  - Yohmei Asakura (grandfather)
  - Yohken Asakura (ancestor)
- Akio Asakura, a main character in Wangan Midnight
- Junichi Asakura, of the D.C.: Da Capo series
  Junichi's relatives:
  - Nemu Asakura (adopted sister and, later, wife)
  - Otome Asakura (granddaughter), character from D.C. II: Da Capo II
  - Yume Asakura (granddaughter), character from D.C. II: Da Capo II

== See also ==
- Asakura, Ehime, Ehime Prefecture, Japan
- Asakura, Fukuoka, Fukuoka Prefecture, Japan
- Asakura District, Fukuoka, Fukuoka Prefecture, Japan (former district)
