= Shōzō Arisaka =

Japanese naval engineer (1868–1941)

- 有坂 鉊蔵
- Born: February 4, 1868
- Died: January 19, 1941 (aged 72)
- Education: University of Tokyo
- Occupation: Naval engineer
- Employers: Imperial Japanese Navy; University of Tokyo
- Known for: Discovery of Yayoi pottery Development of new types of guns

Vice Admiral Shōzō Arisaka (有坂 鉊蔵; February 4, 1868 – January 19, 1941) was a Japanese naval engineer and amateur archaeologist.

== Life ==
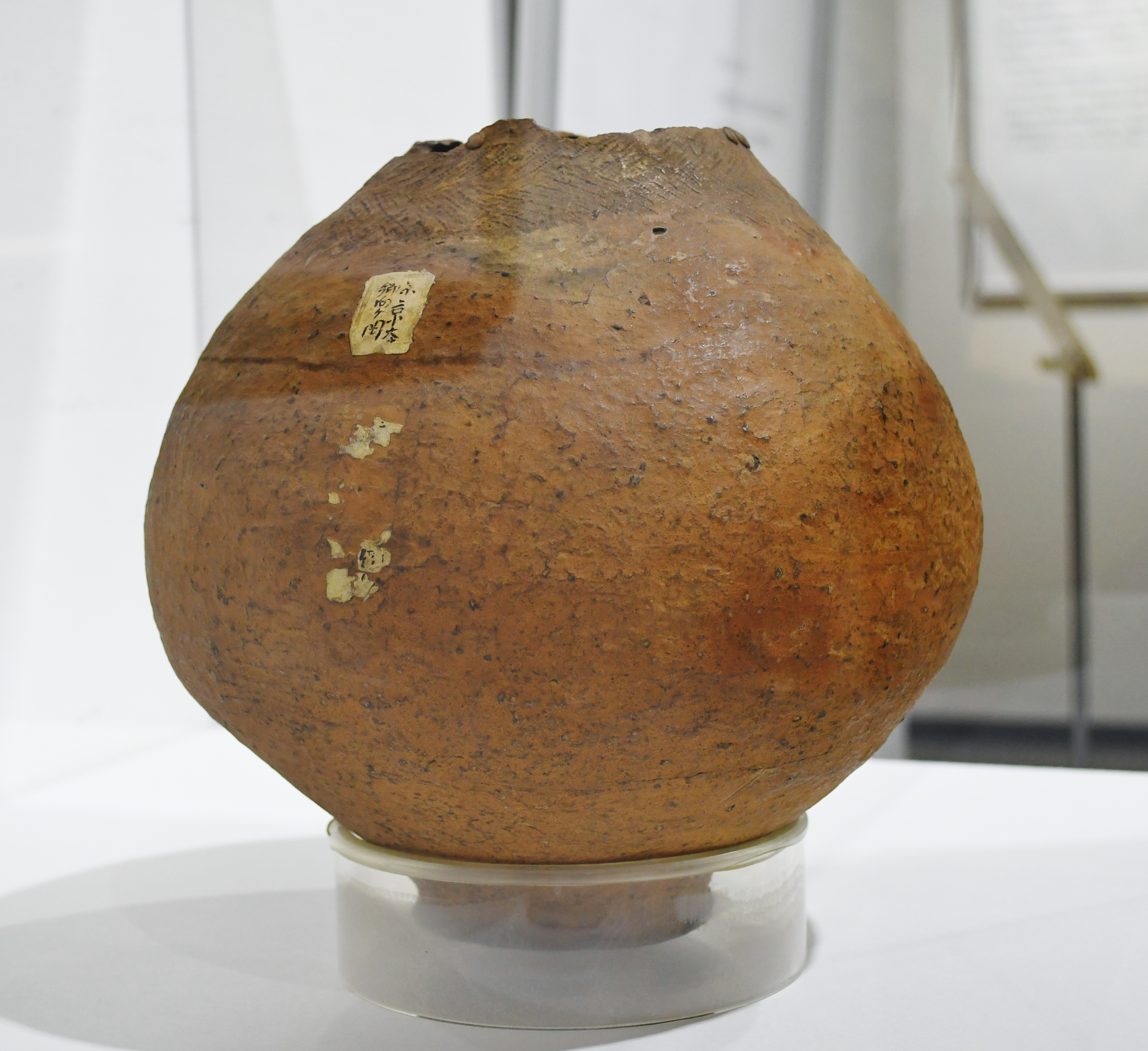
A replica of the pot excavated by Shōzō Arisaka in 1884. The original artefact is preserved at the University of Tokyo Museum.

Arisaka was born as the second son of Senkichi Arisaka (有坂銓吉), one of 25 samurai responsible for rivers in the Kanto region (四川用水方普請役) under the Tokugawa shogunate. He entered the preparatory division of the University of Tokyo in 1884. Although he aspired to become an engineer, he had a lifelong interest in archaeology. During his studies, he excavated what became known as the first example of Yayoi pottery at the Yayoi 2-chome Site, after which the period was named.

He won a scholarship from the Imperial Navy and matriculated at the University of Tokyo in 1887 to study engineering, graduating in July 1890. Shortly after, he was sent to France, where he interned at Hotchkiss et Cie. Returning to Japan in December 1893, he began working as a naval engineer specialised in cannons and guns. In 1898, he was posted to England for two years as Japan and Britain were strengthening ties, culminating in the Anglo-Japanese Alliance of 1902.

In 1902, he earned a PhD from his alma mater and began a dual role as a naval engineer and a professor at the University of Tokyo, a position he held until 1925. He died on 19 January 1941. His archaeological collection and the first known example of Yayoi pottery, excavated by Arisaka in 1884, are preserved at the University of Tokyo Museum. His son, Hideyo Arisaka, became a linguist specialising in historical Japanese phonology.
