= Yayoi 2-chōme Site =

Yayoi 2-chome Site
- 弥生二丁目遺跡 (Japanese)
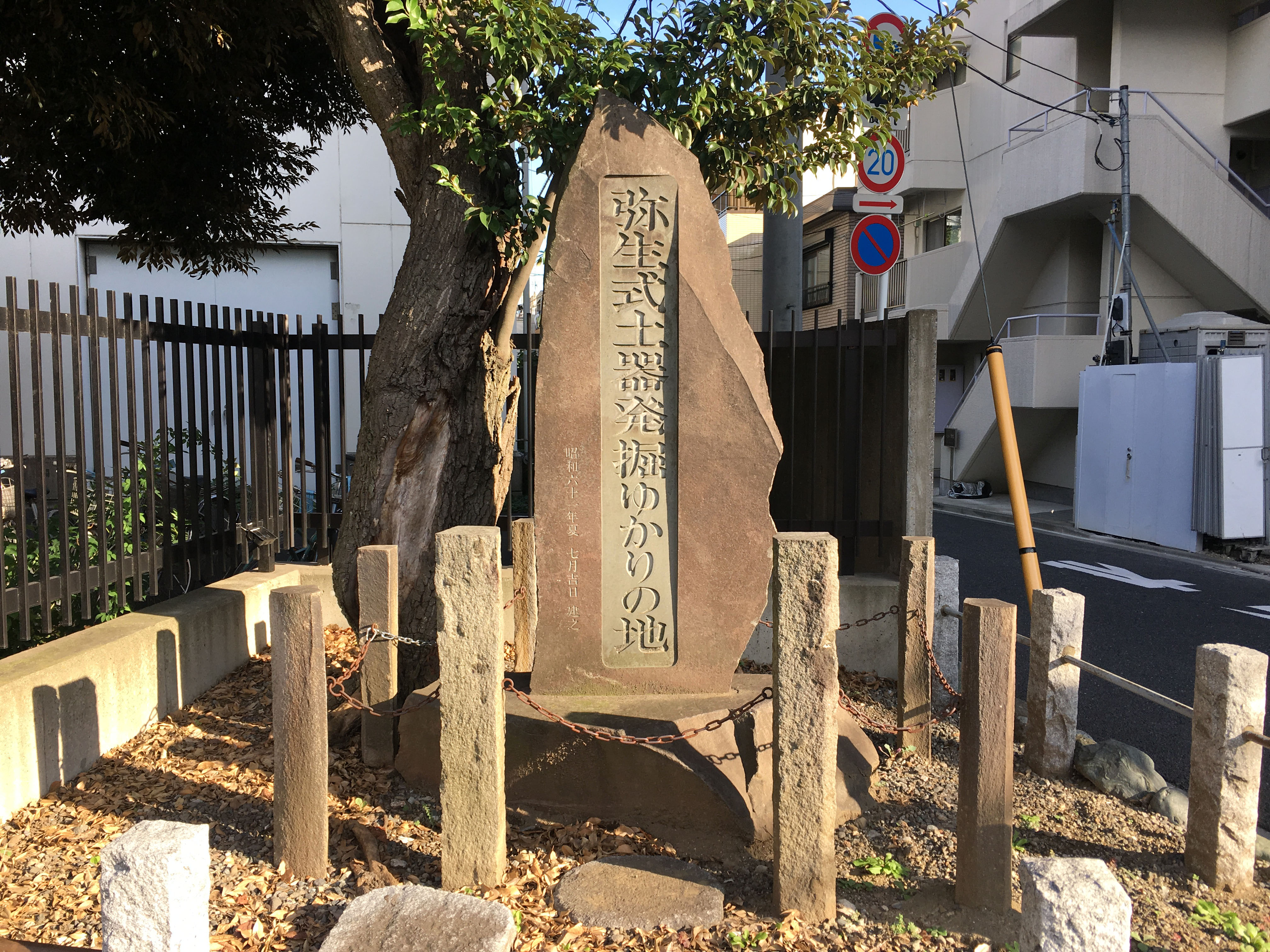
- Yayoi 2-chome Site

- Yayoi 2-chome Site Yayoi 2-chōme Site (Japan)
- 35°43′00″N 139°45′52″E
- Type: settlement trace
- Periods: Yayoi period
- Location: Bunkyō, Tokyo, Japan
- Region: Kantō region

Site notes
- Public access: Yes (no facilities)

The Yayoi 2-chome site (弥生二丁目遺跡, Yayoi 2-chome iseki) is the name for an archaeological site with the trace of a Yayoi period settlement located in the Mukogaoka neighborhood of Yayoi, in Bunkyō, Tokyo in the Kantō region of Japan. It received protection as a National Historic Site in 1976.

== Overview ==
In 1884, a student at the preparatory school of the University of Tokyo, Shōzō Arisaka, discovered a distinctive red-clay jar in a shell mound in Mukogaoka, facing the Nezu valley in Bunkyō, Tokyo. This jar was very different from Jōmon pottery, and archaeologists named the style "Yayoi pottery" as Mukogaoka was located in the Yayoi neighborhood. Further investigation led to the conclusion that the period (1000 BC to 300 AD) in which it was made was ethnically and culturally distinct from the Jōmon period, and thus the term Yayoi period was coined. This was reported to academia in the 1889 edition of "Toyo Gakugei Magazine", which only mentioned that the location of the find was near an Imperial Japanese Army shooting range. The site was sold to the private sector in 1888, with the northern half becoming the residence of Marquis Asano Nagakoto, the former daimyō of Hiroshima Domain and the southern half developed into a residential area. It was not until 1923, about 40 years after the find, that Arisaka published a text about the pottery in the "Anthropological Magazine". he described the Mukogaoka location as being on the opposite side of the street behind the university, which at the time was a rural area, with no houses or landmarks nearby except for the shooting range, and admitted that he did not keep an exact record of them location and was not unable to precisely identify it due to urban encroachment. The exact location remained lost and over the decades three separate sites have been advanced as possible candidates over the years.

In 1974, archaeologists received word that local elementary school students were collecting pottery exposed in the roots of fallen trees at the Asano area of the campus of the University of Tokyo. The site was a small elevation to the east of the Faculty of Engineering Building, where the ground was being cleared to construct a new research building. A subsequent archaeological excavation found the traces of a settlement with a double moat next to a shell midden. The shells were mainly marine oysters and other shellfish; however, finds also included a whetstone and five examples of Yayoi pottery. Since the characteristics of the pottery excavated in 1974 were similar to those of the pottery excavated in 1884, and as the site is in the approximate location of the missing Mukogaoka Shell Mound, this location was designated as a National Historic Site in 1976. However, as the identification with the Mukogaoka Shell Mound remains unproven, the name used for the National Historic Site was the "Yayoi 2-chome Site" instead of the "Mukogaoka Shell Mound".

The site is about a three-minute walk from Nezu Station on the Tokyo Metro Chiyoda Line.

The Yayoi pottery originally excavated in 1884 is kept at the Museum of the University of Tokyo, and is designated as a National Important Cultural Property. It has a height of 22.0 centimeters and maximum diameter of 22.7 centimeter, and was made in the late Yayoi period. It is stylistically similar to pottery found in the Tokai region, mainly the coast of Suruga Bay, rather than the southern Kantō region and may have come to this area by trade.

== See also ==
- List of Historic Sites of Japan (Tōkyō)
