= Hiroshi Hara (botanist) =

Japanese botanist

Hiroshi Hara (原 寛, Hara Hiroshi, January 5, 1911 – September 24, 1986) was a Japanese botanist.

Hara was born 1911 in Nagano. He studied at The University of Tokyo and became a professor there in 1957. Between 1968 and 1971 he was the director of the newly established University Museum of The University of Tokyo. Hara specialized in mosses, but described other plants as well.
