= Dokdo Museum =

Name used for two museums in South Korea, relating to the Liancourt Rocks

Coordinates: 37.4860°N 130.8971°E

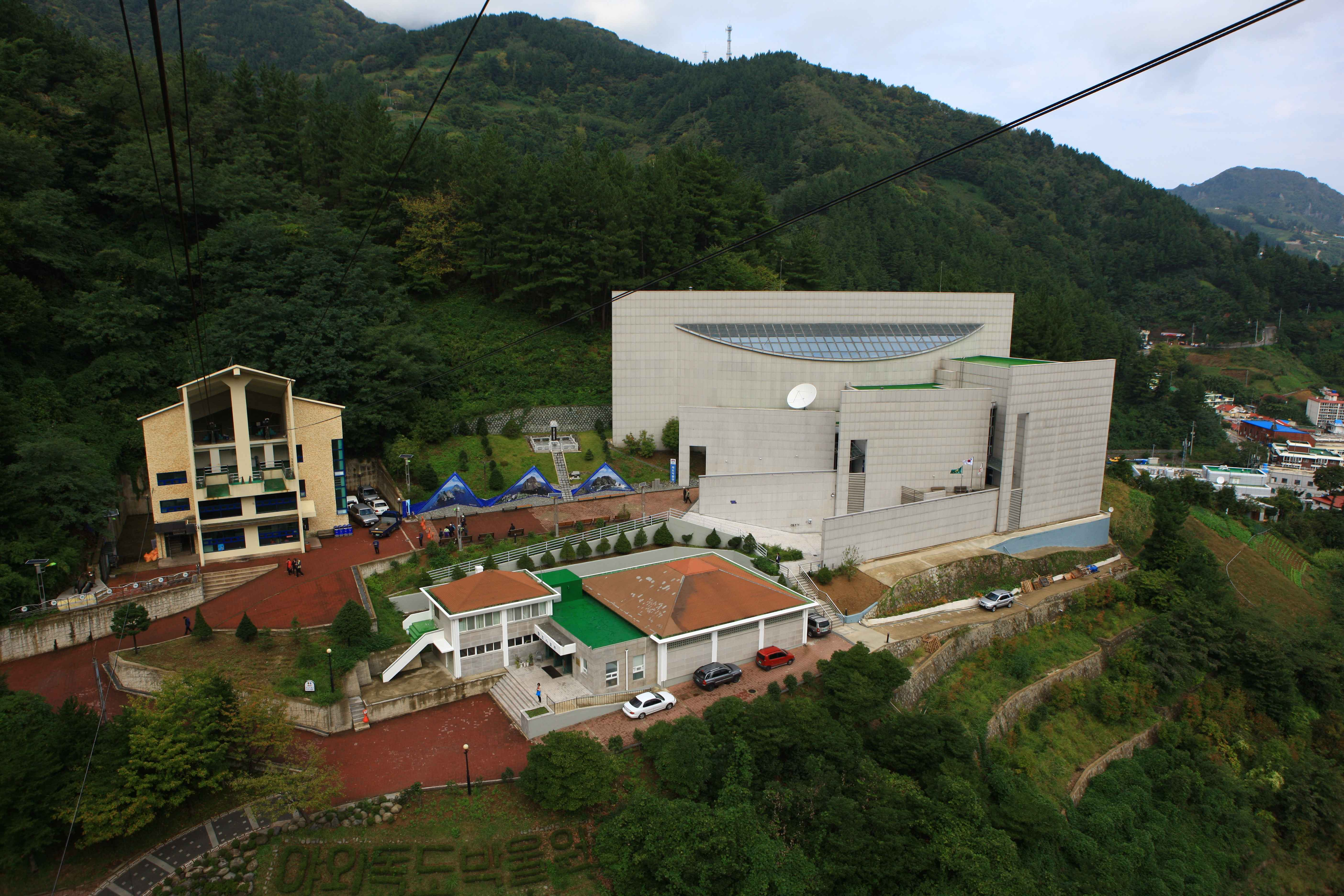
- The museum in Ulleungdo

Korean name
- Hangul: 독도박물관
- Hanja: 獨島博物館
- RR: Dokdo bangmulgwan
- MR: Tokto pangmulgwan

Dokdo Museum is the name used for two museums in Korea that relate to the Liancourt Rocks, known as Dokdo in Korean. One of the museums is located in Ulleungdo and the other, which opened later, is in Seoul.

== Ulleung-gun ==
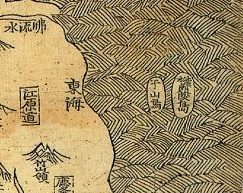
Joseon map(1530): Ulleungdo (鬱陵島) and Usando (于山島), ancient Dokdo（獨島）.

The Dokdo Museum in Ulleung is government run. It is underwritten by Samsung. The museum was built in the shape of Sambongdo (三峰島, literally "Three Peaks Island," Liancourt Rocks' name in the Joseon Dynasty). The first curator, Lee Jong-Hak, collected many materials from all over the world. Dokdo Museum was also founded with help from Hong Sun-Chil, who was the leader of the Volunteer Guard of Dokdo. It is the only museum about territory in Korea.

The museum at Ulleungdo opened in 1995 or 1997 with a mission of collecting and researching the Rocks and the Sea of Japan. Korea aims to use this exhibit as a means of strengthening its claim over the rocks.

== Seoul ==
The Seoul Museum, operated by the Northeast Asian History Foundation opened in 2012. The museum, which has a collection of maps and other documents, focuses on education and virtual experiences and forms part of what has come to be called Dokdo-ganda, propaganda as to the ownership of these islands.

== See also ==
- Voluntary Agency Network of Korea
- National Museum of Territory and Sovereignty
