= Diplomatic Archives of the Ministry of Foreign Affairs of Japan =

Coordinates: 35.6612963°N 139.7371973°E

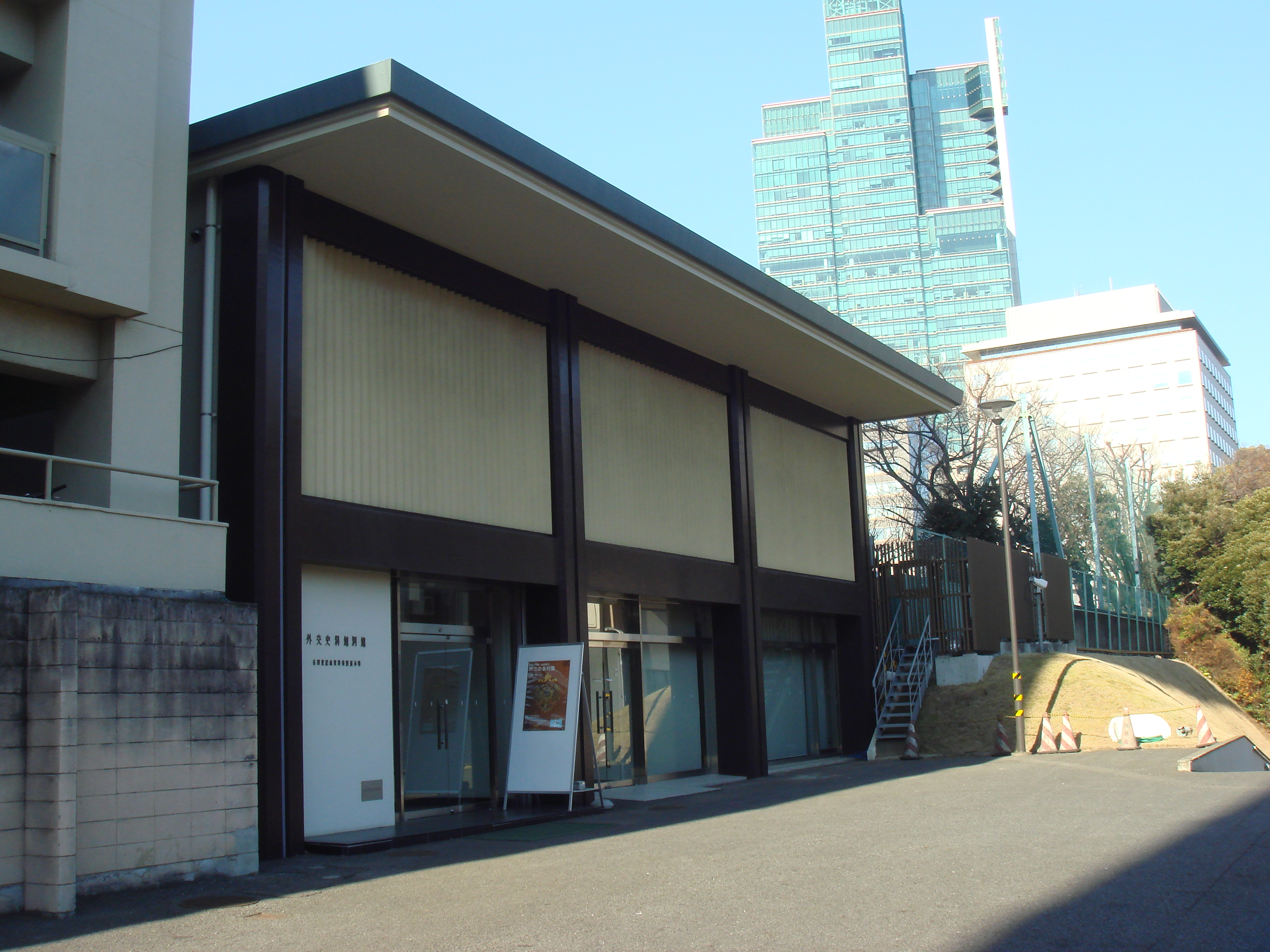
Exhibition hall of the Diplomatic Archives of the Ministry of Foreign Affairs

The Diplomatic Archives of the Ministry of Foreign Affairs of Japan (外務省外交史料館, Gaimushō Gaikō Shiryōkan) (formerly Diplomatic Record Office of the Ministry of Foreign Affairs) in Tokyo, Japan, is the office of the Ministry of Foreign Affairs in charge of archiving Japan's diplomatic documents.

An exhibition hall near the archives building (別館展示室) can be visited freely, in which exhibits are regularly held.

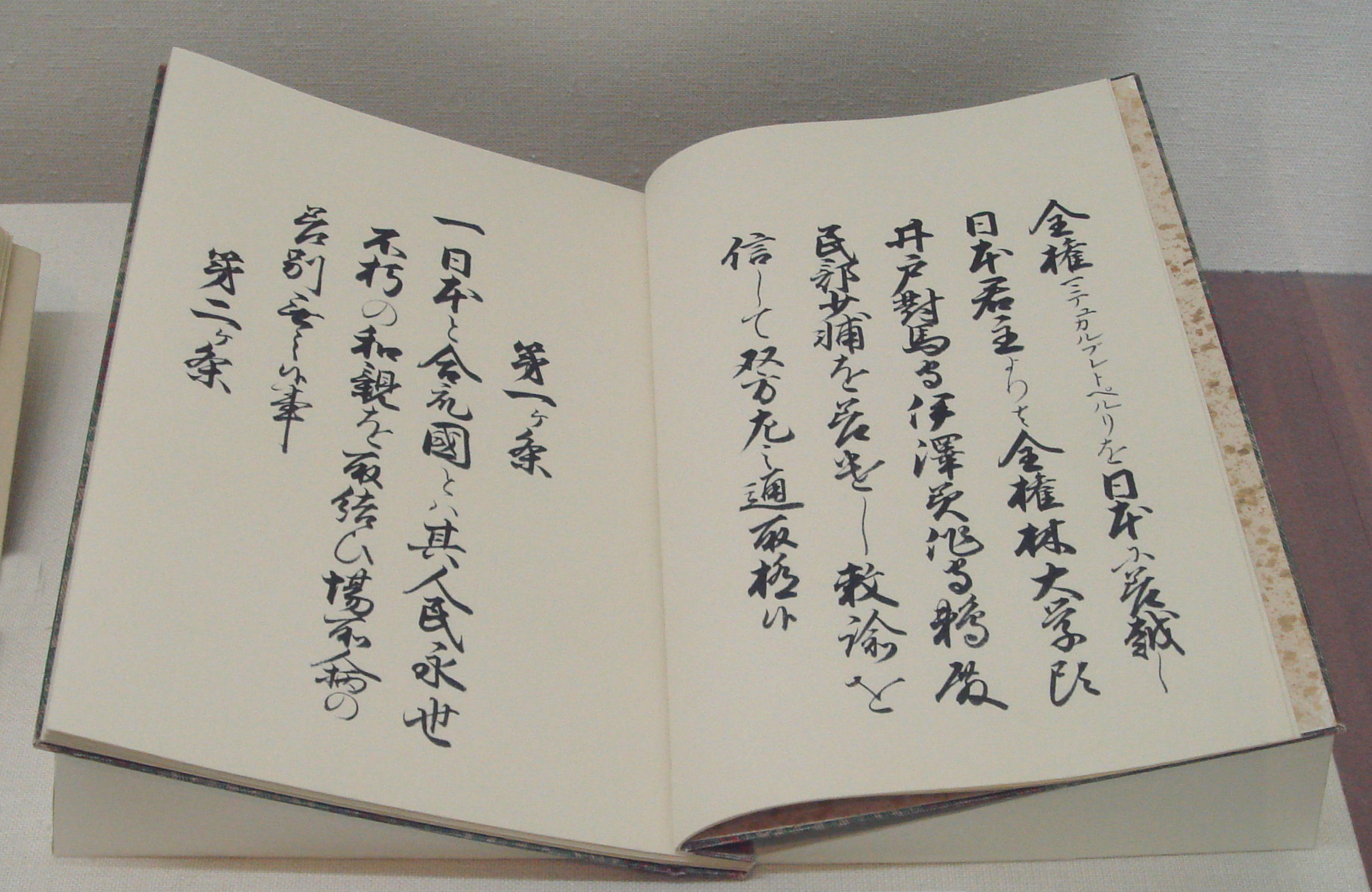
Ratification of the Japan-US Treaty of Peace and Amity, 21 February 1855.

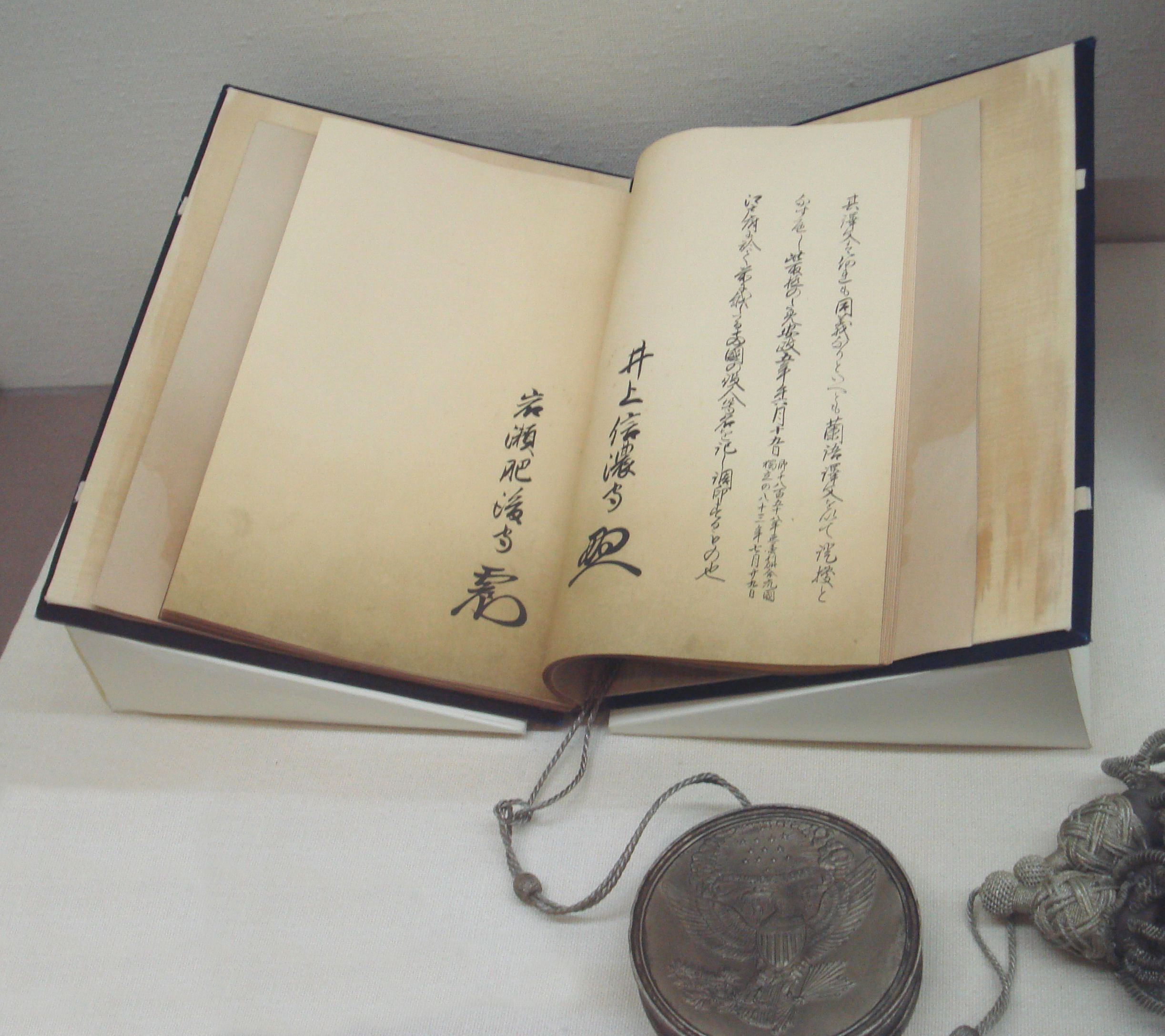
Treaty of Amity and Commerce between Japan and the United States, 29 July 1858.

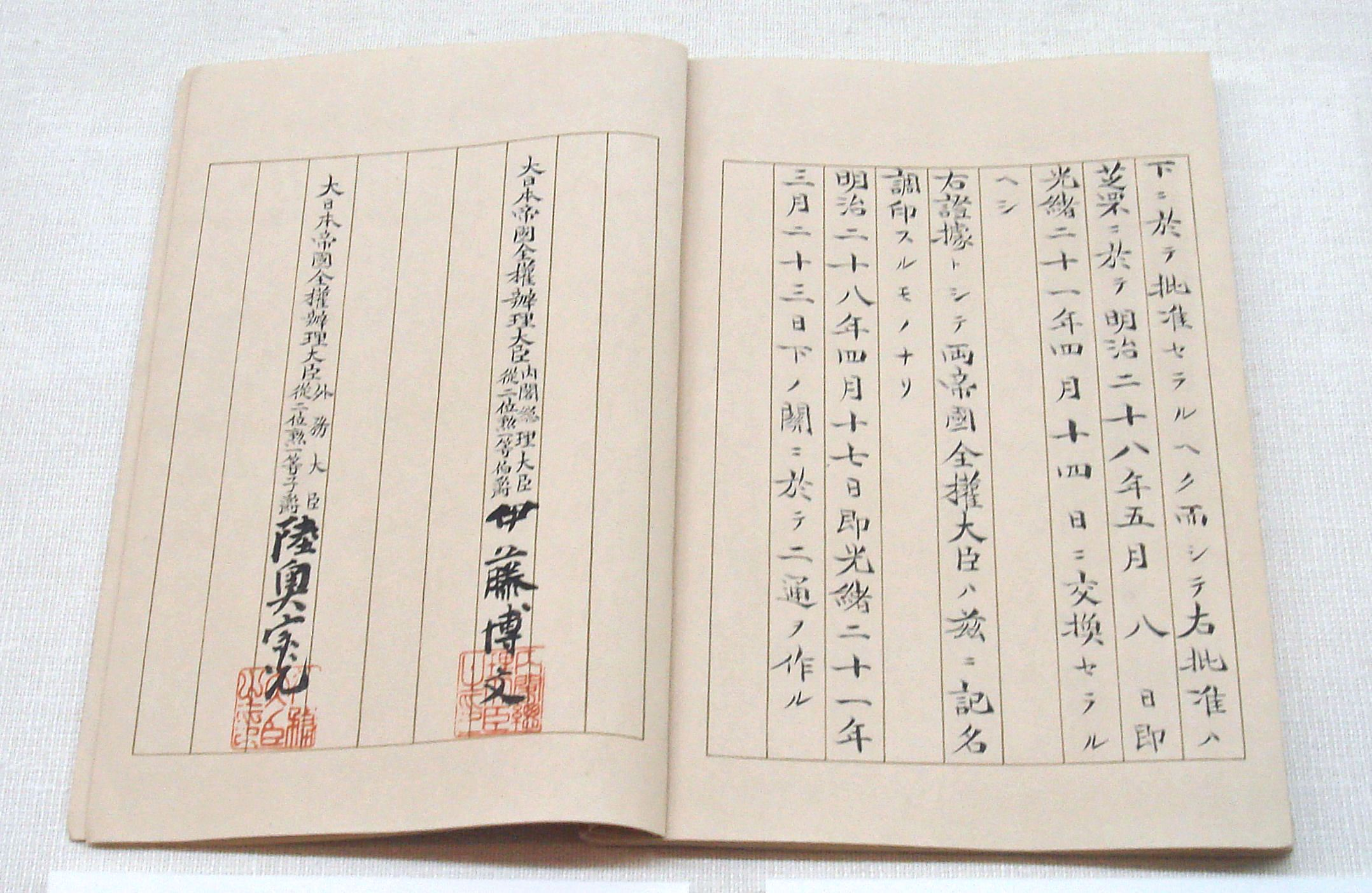
Japan-China Peace Treaty, 17 April 1895.

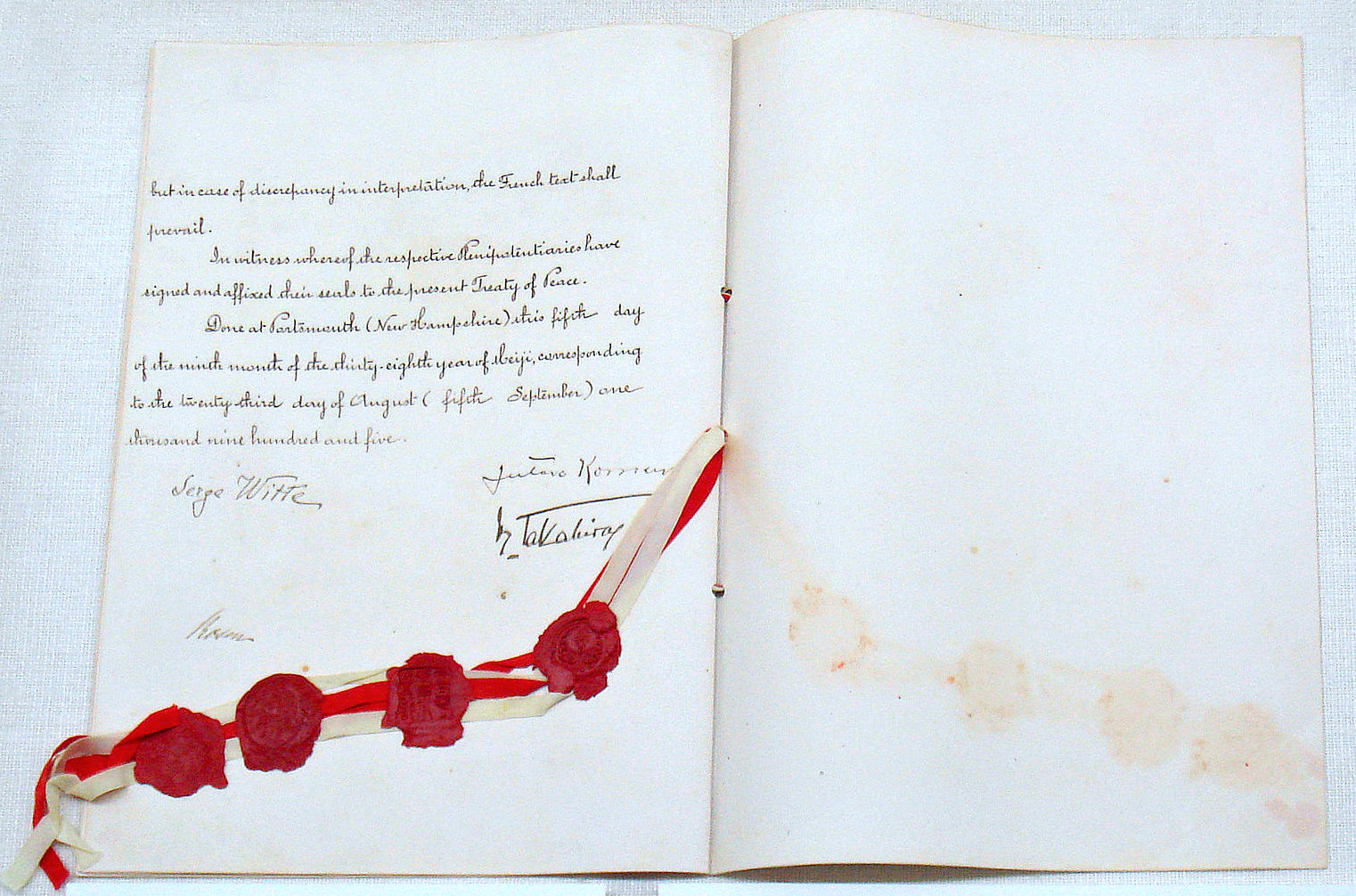
Japan-Russia Treaty of Peace, 5 September 1905.

== See also ==
- List of museums in Tokyo
