= Printing Museum, Tokyo =

Museum in Tokyo, Japan

Coordinates: 35°42′33.6″N 139°44′29.8″E

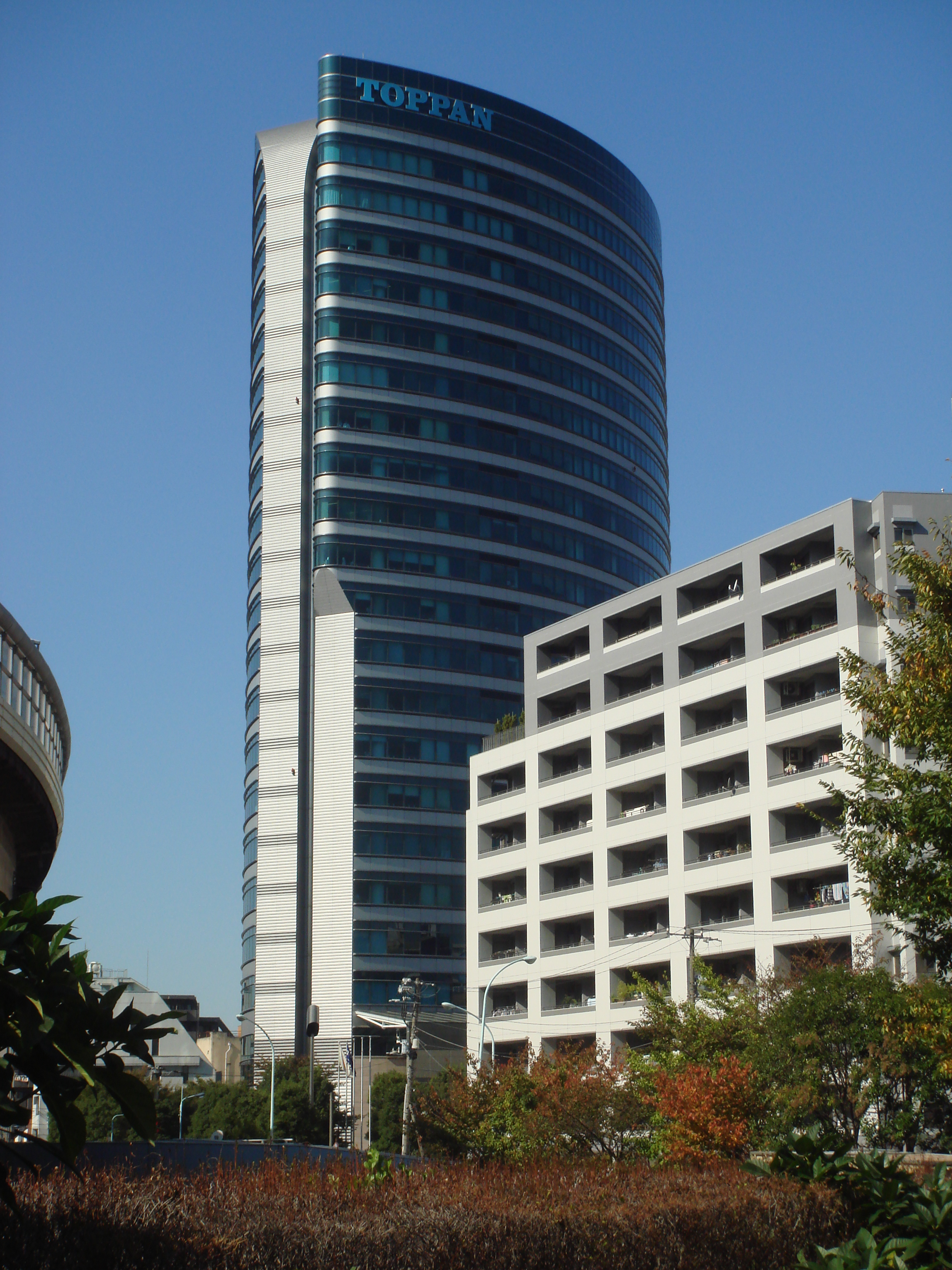
The Printing Museum is in the ground floor of the Toppan building.

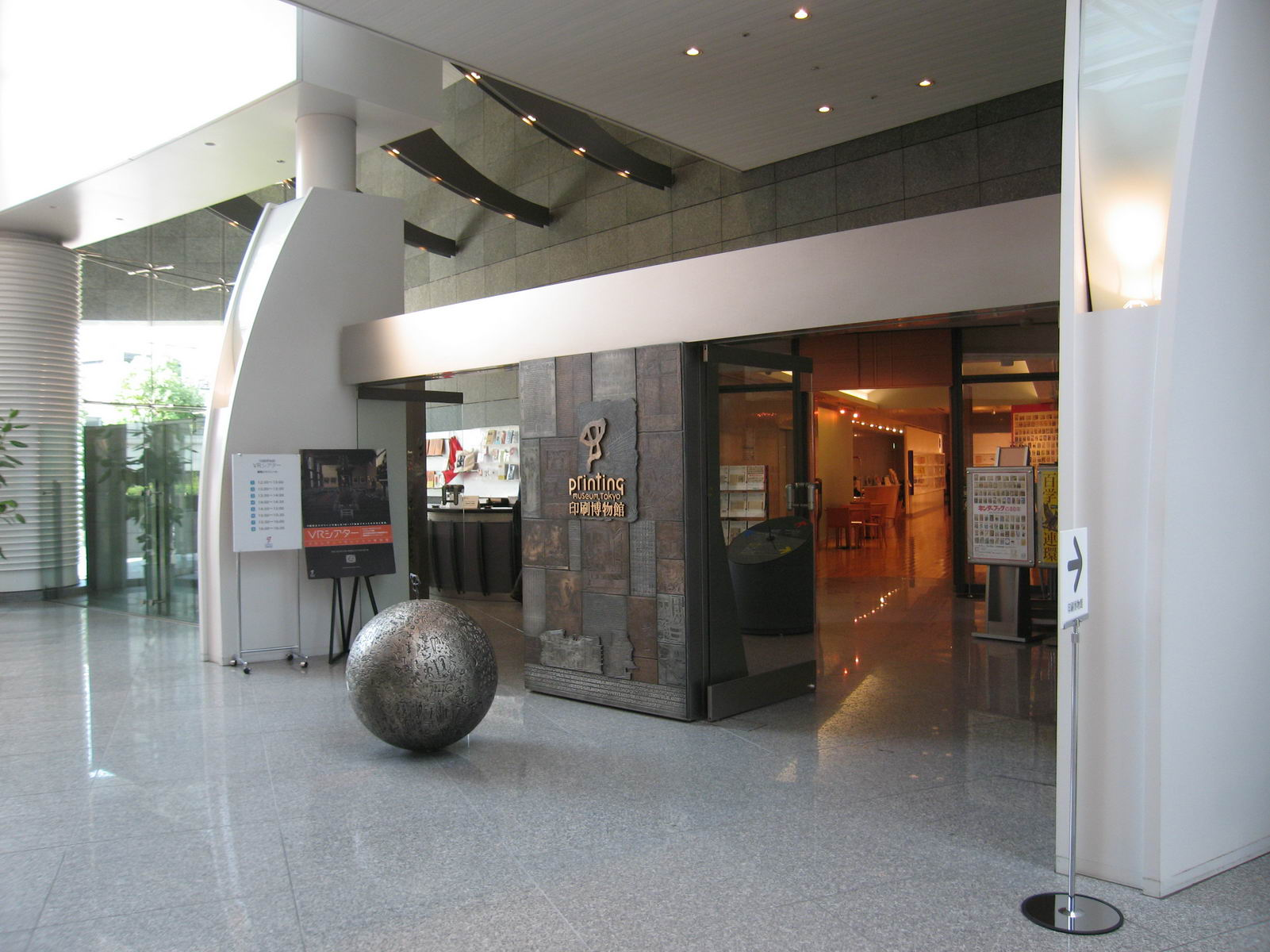
Entrance to the Museum.

The Printing Museum (Japanese: 印刷博物館) is a museum in Bunkyo-ku, Tokyo, Japan. It is dedicated to the history and techniques of printing, and is located in the head office building of Toppan Printing.

== History ==
The Printing Museum was established in 2000 in Bunkyo-ku, Tokyo, Japan. The Museum was later renovated in October of 2020. Around 70,000 items related to printing are housed at the museum and about 300 are displayed.

=== Printing House ===
The printing museum has a printing house that is works to preserve printing by research, and hands on experiences. The House is home to what is believed to be the worlds oldest printed work, the Hyakumanto Dharani. The museum provides a wide range of workshops for visitors.

The museum has been visited by the Emperor and Empress of Japan, as well as Her Majesty the Queen of Norway.

Visitors can take tours, see old machines, and experience a collection of European typefaces that have been displayed in historical timelines.

== See also ==
- List of museums in Tokyo
- History of printing
