= Ad Museum Tokyo =

- アド・ミュージアム東京
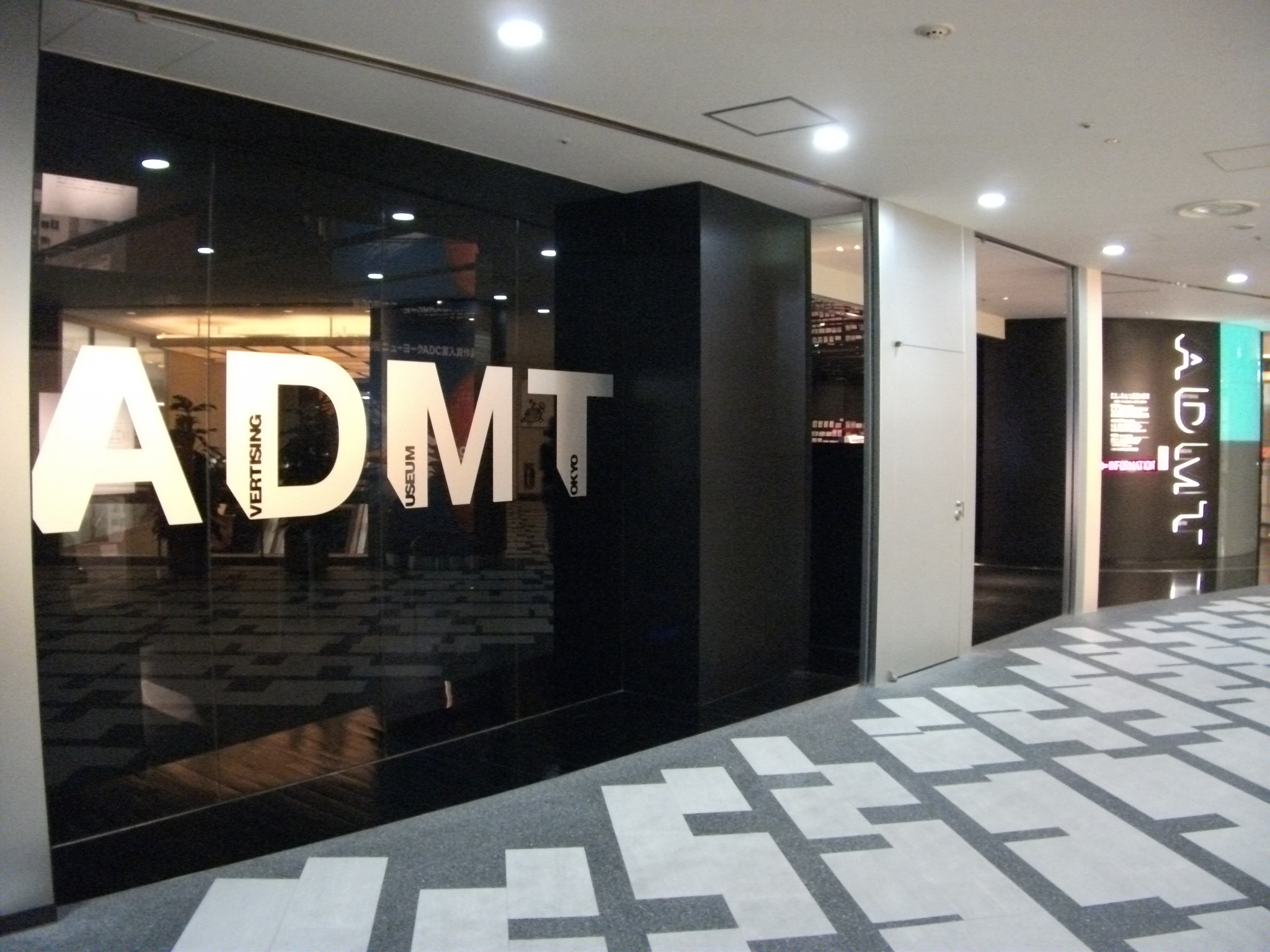
- Established: 1 December 2002
- Location: Higashi-Shinbashi, Minato, Tokyo, Japan
- Coordinates: 35.664333°N 139.762222°E
- Type: advertising museum
- Founder: Yoshida Hideo Memorial Fund
- Website: www.admt.jp/en/

Ad Museum Tokyo (アド・ミュージアム東京, Ado Myuciamu Tokyo) is an advertising museum in Shiodome in the Minato ward of Tokyo, Japan. Located in the basement of the Caretta Shiodome Building, it is the only museum in Japan dedicated to the promotion of studies in advertising.

== History ==
Ad Museum Tokyo was established by the Yoshida Hideo Memorial Foundation on December 1, 2002, to commemorate the 100th anniversary of the birth of Yoshida Hideo. In December 2017, reconstruction work was carried out in the museum.

== Facility and collections ==
The museum's total exhibition area is 1078,3 m^{2}. Exhibitions in the museum are set chronological order, with the first exhibition being dedicated to variety of business tricks from the Edo period. There are introductions to hikifuda (flyers), nishiki-e (colored woodblock prints), ebira (posters), story boards of famous advertisements and other materials. The exhibition suggests that the world's first marketing genius may have been Takatoshi Mitsui. The museum's collection includes approximately 330,000 pieces of advertising material.

Japanese advertising rapidly Westernized and modernized in the Shōwa era. In the museum's collection, there are many of the brand names from this era's adverts, including Shiseido, Calpis, and Morinaga Milk Caramel. As the exhibit continues through the post-war era to the Heisei era, an array of posters, newspaper clippings, and the like are on display.

There are also four cloud-shaped audio visual booths, "Four Feelings", suspended from the ceiling. In these visual booths visitors can watch an assortment of television commercials curated based on the "feelings" they evoke. In addition to its collection, the museum also features a gift shop and a temporary exhibit which usually displays recent award-winning advertisements and their creative processes.

=== Library ===
The library of the museum is the only specialized library in Japan focused on advertising communication. The library was founded in 1966 as the Advertising Library of Yoshida Hideo Memorial Hall. It houses approximately 30,000 works, mainly comprising advertising-related Japanese and foreign books, magazines, and award-winning advertising works. Materials in the library are not available for lending, but they may be viewed freely by anyone.
