= Kyoko Asakura =

Japanese sculptor (1925–2016)

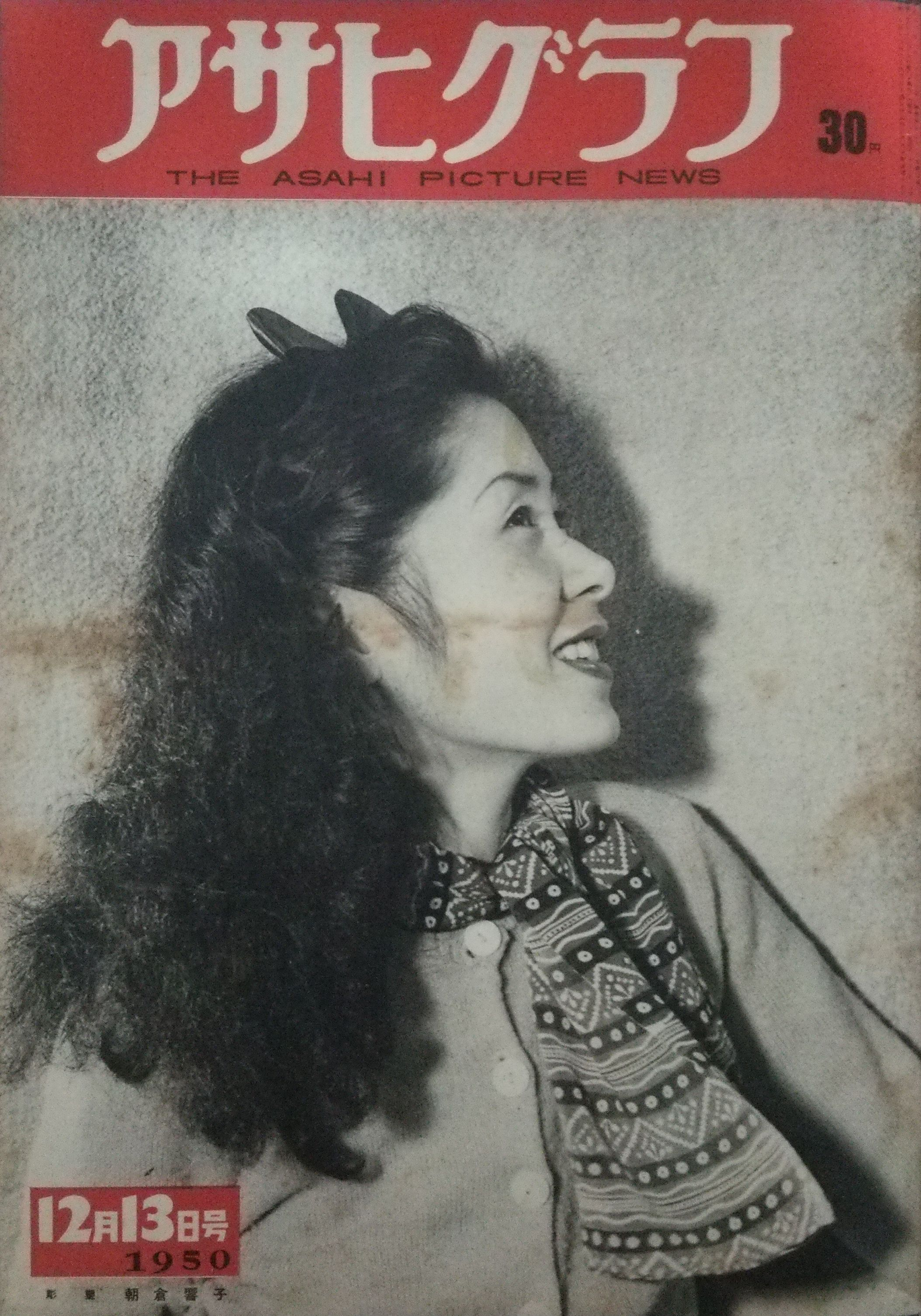
Asakura in 1950

Kyoko Asakura (Japanese: 朝倉 響子, Hepburn: Asakura Kyōko; 9 December 1925, Tokyo – 30 May 2016, Tokyo) was a Japanese sculptor. Her birth name was written 矜子. She was the second daughter of sculptor Fumio Asakura and sister of stage designer and painter Setsu Asakura.

== Career ==
- 1948 - Nitten Excellence
- 1956 - withdrew from Nitten
- 1979 - 7th Nagano Prefecture Outdoor Sculpture Award
- 1982 - Teijiro Nakahara Excellence Award.

== Solo Exhibition ==
- 1960 - Bungeishunjū gallery, Tokyo
- 1962 - Takashimaya, Osaka Prefecture
- 1967 - Gallery Cube, Tokyo
- 1970 - Gallery Universe, Tokyo (also in 1973, 1978, 1981)
- 1985 - Shibuya PARCO, Tokyo / Yamagata Museum of Art, Yamagata Prefecture
- 1988 - Shibuya PARCO, Tokyo (also in 1993)
- 2000 - Modern Sculpture Center, Tokyo
- 2000 - Fumio Asakura Memorial Hall, Oita Prefecture
- 2003–2004 - Kitakyushu Municipal Museum of Art, Fukuoka Prefecture
- 2010 - Ueno Royal Museum, Tokyo

== Public space collection ==
- "ANNE", New Chitose Airport, Hokkaido
- "Futari", Sendai West Park, Miyagi Prefecture
- "Raleigh", Akita Museum of Modern Art, Akita Prefecture
- "MARI", Tokyo Metropolitan Government, Tokyo
- "Mari and Sherry", Tokyo Metropolitan Theatre, Tokyo
- "Jill", Nihonbashi Plaza Building, Tokyo
- "Fiona and Arian", Education Forest Park, Tokyo
- "NIKE", "Summer", Tokyo Sumitomo Twin Building, Tokyo
- "I am a juvenile newspaper", Arisugawa-no-miya Memorial Park, Tokyo
- "Tomorrow (Kanji: "Dinner on Sun Candle")", Tokyo Metropolitan Hiroo Hospital, Tokyo
- "Woman", Machida station, Tokyo
- "CONNECTION", Fuchu City Hall, Tokyo
- "Nicola", street of Himeji
- "Ann and Michelle", Fuchu Forest Park, Tokyo
- "NIKE '83", Joinus Forest, Kanagawa
- "Nike and Nicola", Yokohama Citizens' Cultural Center, Kanagawa
- "Michelle", Kawaguchi Western Park, Saitama
- "Raleigh", "Mary and Cathy", Sakura Station, Chiba
- "Lecture", Nagano-shi Shiroyama Park Children's amusement park, Nagano
- "Hitotsuki", Takaoka-shi Sogo-dori, Toyama
- "RAQUEL", Sakae Park, Aichi
- "Jill", Midosu Sculpture Street, Osaka
- "Flower", Hotel Grand Hill Ichigaya, Tokyo
- "Vanessa", Hotel Grand Hill Ichigaya, Tokyo
- "Lisa", Hotel Grand Hill Ichigaya, Tokyo

== Work collection ==
- Asakura Kyoko Sculpture Collection and Waves, Photo book · Narahara Kazutaka, PARCO Publishing, 1980
- Kyoko, Photo book, Shigeo Anzai, PARCO publication, 1985
