= Yoku Moku Museum =

Museum in Tokyo of ceramics by Pablo Picasso

Coordinates: 35.6596°N 139.7140°E

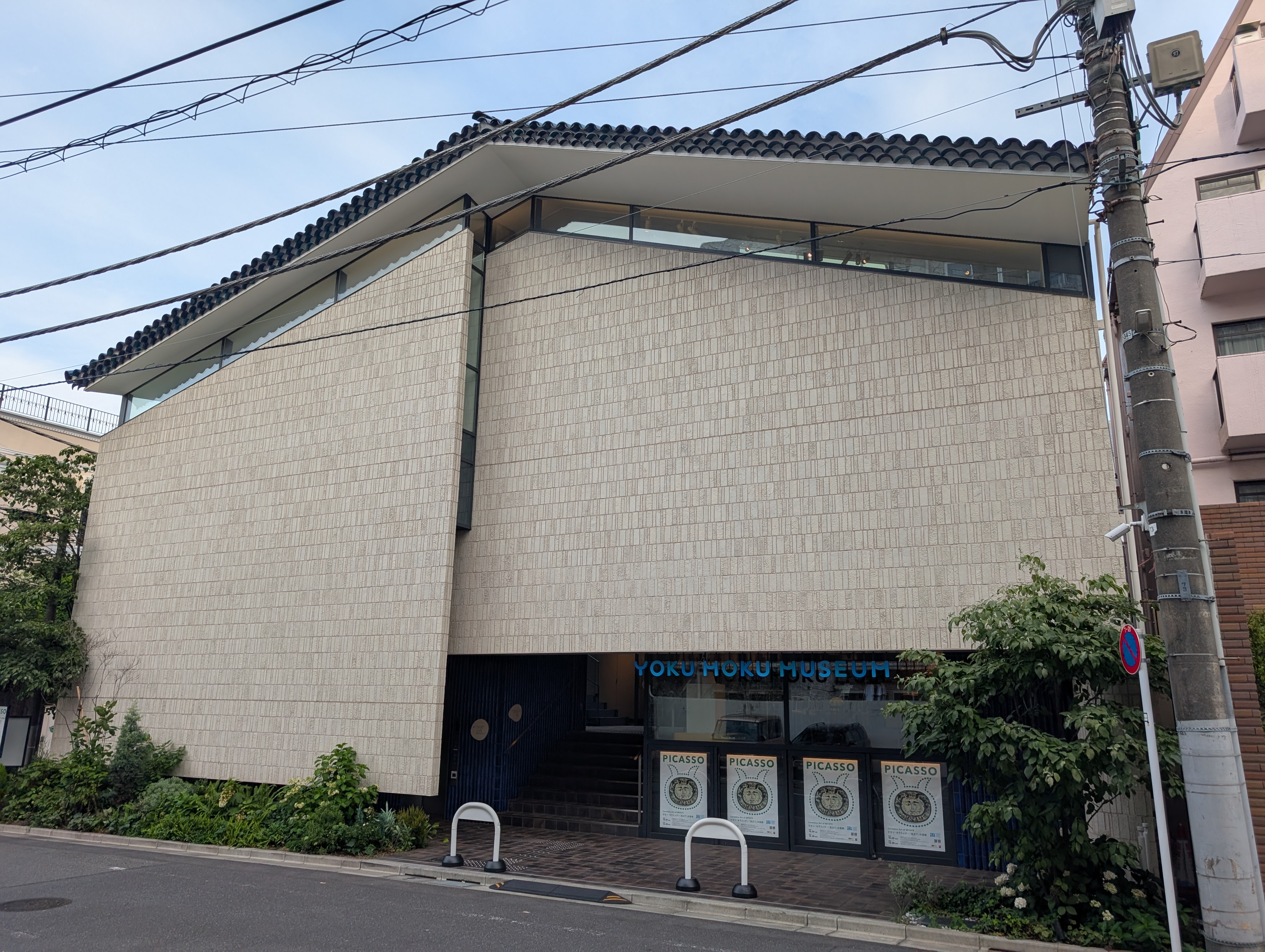
Yoku Moku Museum

Yoku Moku Museum (Japanese: ヨックモックミュージアム) is a private museum in Tokyo, featuring one of the world's largest collections of ceramics by Pablo Picasso. The museum's collection comprises more than 500 artworks.

== History ==
The museum was founded in 2016 in Minato, Tokyo (Japan). The director of the museum, Toshiyasu Fujinawa, who is the grandson of the founder of Yoku Moku, is an avid art collector and has accumulated more than 500 of Pablo Picasso's ceramic works over the course of 30 years.

== Layout ==
Although museums usually avoid natural light, the top exhibition floor of the building has been designed to maximize natural light because ceramics are resistant to ultraviolet rays. The museum also features a café, a museum shop, and a library.

== Publications ==
Since its opening, the museum has published a number of bilingual (English/Japanese books) about its collection of Picasso ceramics, including the following:

- Picasso: Life on the Côte d’Azur (2020)
- Picasso the Mediterranean: Enjoying the Mythical World (2021)
- Picasso Ceramics: The Modern Touch (2022)
- Picasso: Odes to Nature (2023)
- Picasso Ceramics: Art of Mitate (2024)
