= Tonogayato Garden =

Japanese Garden in Tokyo

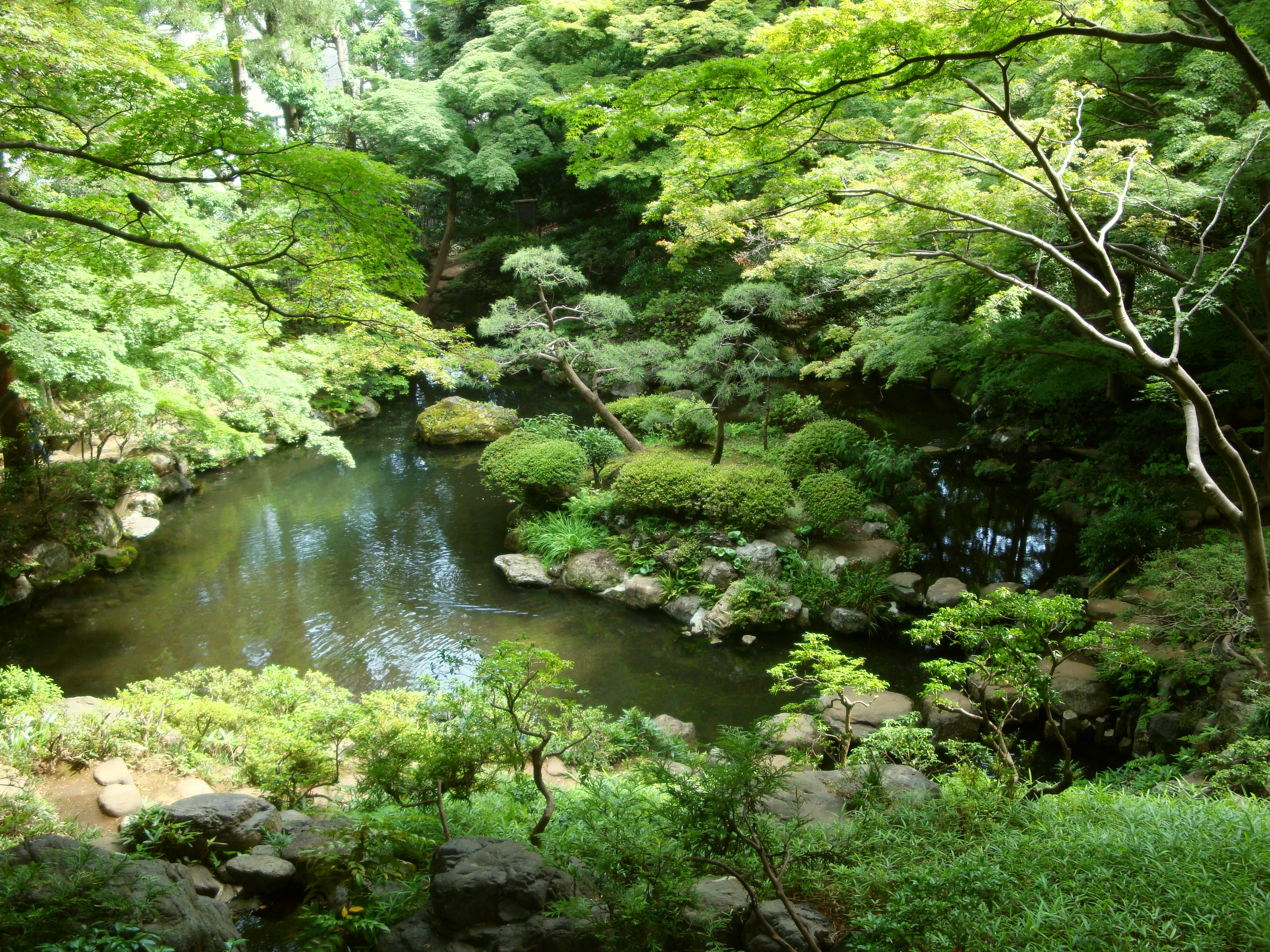
- Pond with an island in Tonogayato Garden
- Interactive map of Tonogayato Garden
- Location: Kokubunji, Tokyo, Japan
- Coordinates: 35°41′55″N 139°28′55″E
- Area: 21,123.59 square metres (5.21975 acres)
- Created: 1 April 1979
- Public transit: Kokubunji Station

Tonogayato Garden (殿ヶ谷戸庭園, Tonogayato Teien) is a traditional Japanese garden located in Kokubunji, Tokyo. Its name comes from the region's old name, Tonogayato, Kokubunji village. The garden covers an area of 21,124 square metres (5.2 acres).

== History ==
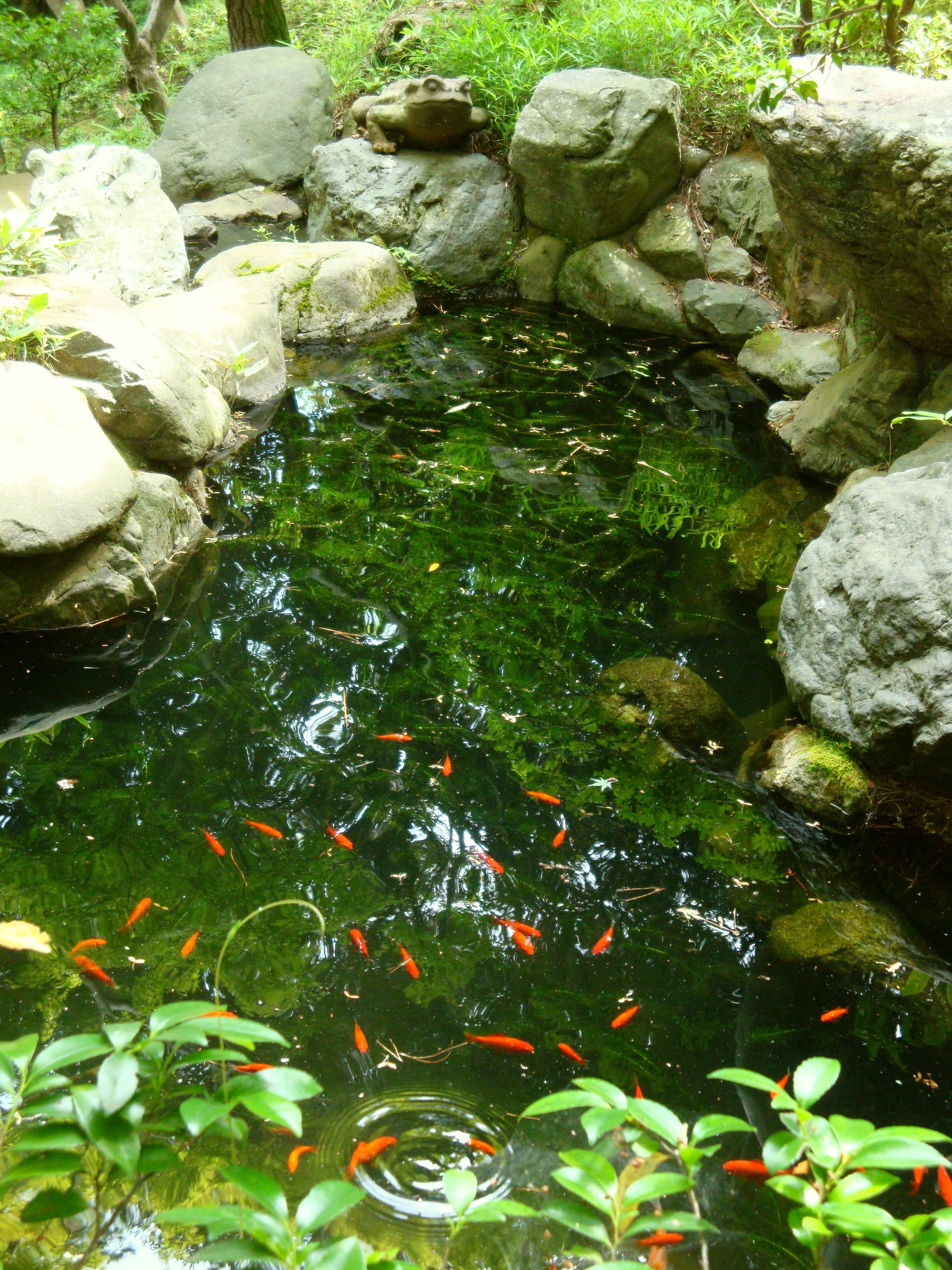
Small goldfish pond with a stone frog

The garden was laid out between 1913 and 1915 in the grounds of a villa built for Eguchi Teijo, the vice-president of the Manchurian Railway, who was a senior director of the Mitsubishi group. In 1929, the garden was purchased by the founder of Mitsubishi, Iwasaki Yatarō, who completed it as a circular style garden with a tea house. It was used as a villa for the Iwasaki Family. In response to a plan to develop the area for other uses, local residents started a campaign to preserve the garden. The Tokyo Metropolitan Government eventually purchased it in 1974 and opened it to the public in 1979. In 1998, the Tonogayato Garden was designated as a Place of Scenic Beauty by the Tokyo Metropolitan Government.

== Features ==
The garden is centered on a pond and uses the natural terrain of the Musashino Plateau by incorporating the valleys found in the terrace cliffs into its design. The highlight is the strikingly different types of landscape: a scenic spacious lawn on the top, steep slopes, a pond with waterfalls and bamboo forest at the bottom. There is a depression in the pond containing a natural spring called Jiro Benten that provides large quantities of fresh water. Water that runs off the cliff is a part of the source of the Nogawa River. A tea house called Koyo-tei is also situated in the gardens.

A wide variety of flora and fauna can be found in the garden, including a variety of plants that flower through the course of the year: Shibateranthis pinnatifida (a synonym for Eranthis pinnatifida), dogtooth violet, cypripedium japonicum, cephalanthera erecta, bellflowers, fragrant goldband lily, false anemone, orange spider lily and toad lilies. Japanese ternstroemias are the most prevalent species of tree in the gardens, due to Koyata Iwasaki's fondness for the tree.

The garden is a 2-minute walk from Kokubunji Station on the JR Chūō Line, Seibu Kokubunji Line, and Seibu Tamako Line.

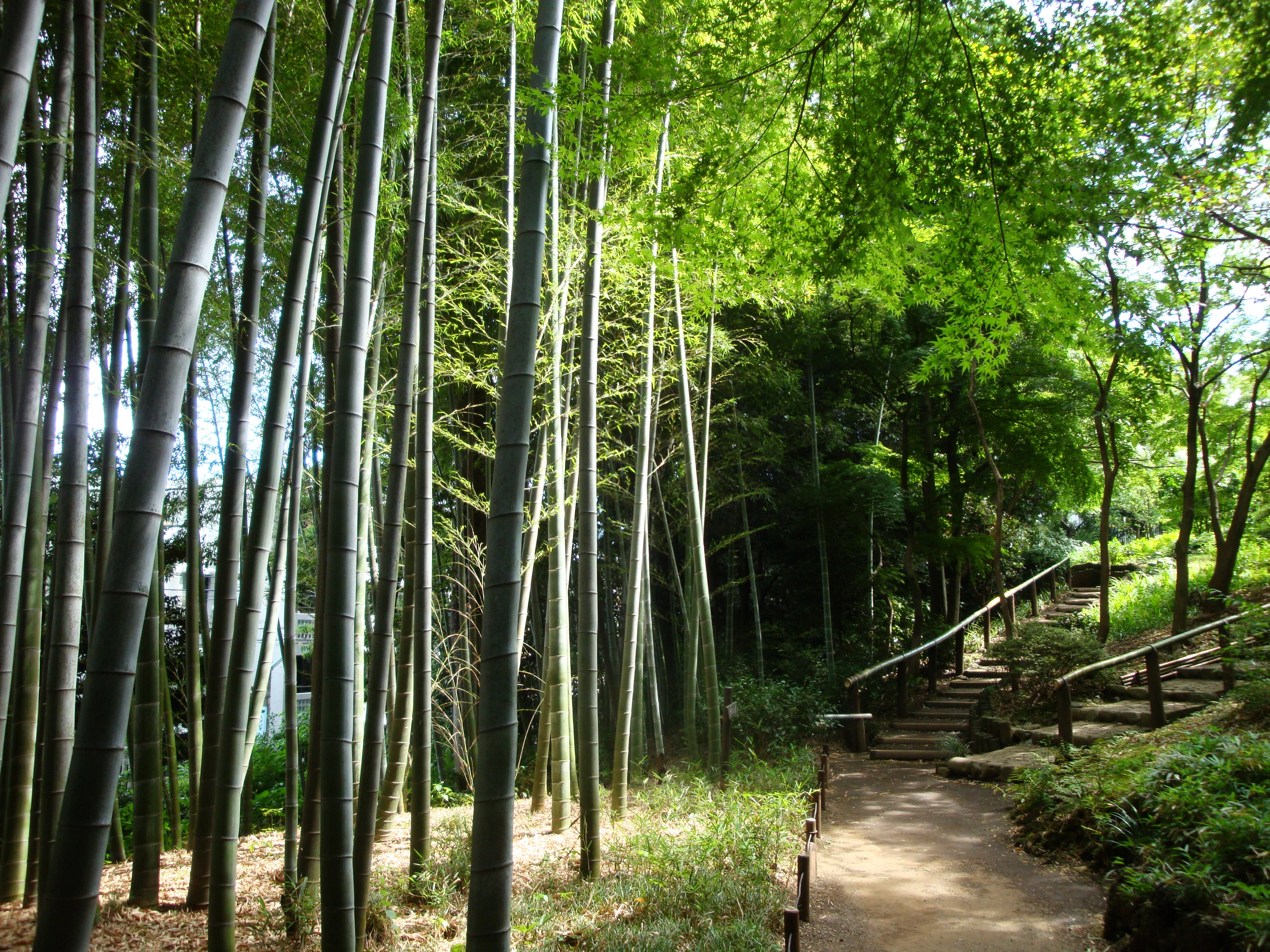
Bamboo forest

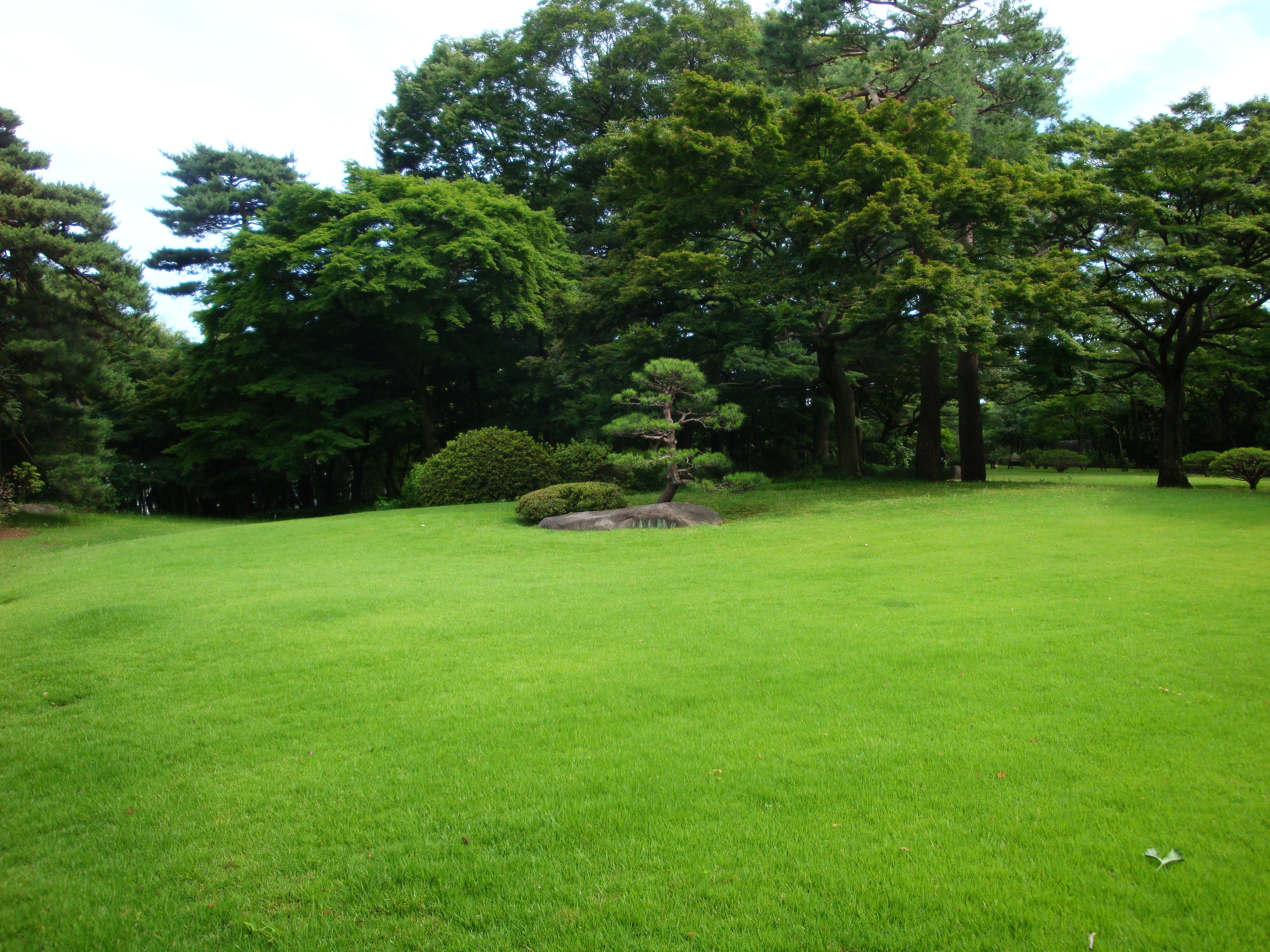
Spacious lawn

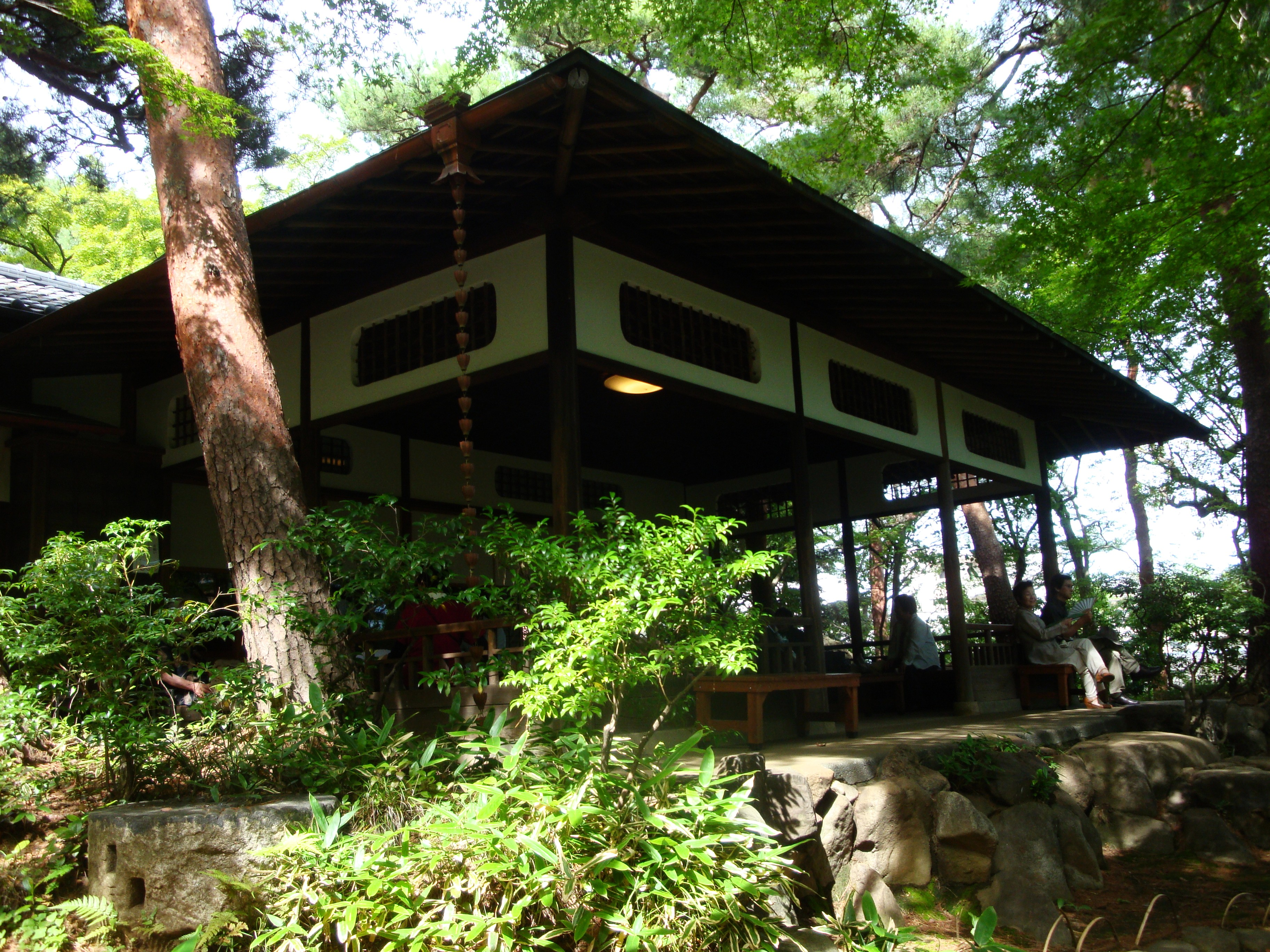
Tea house

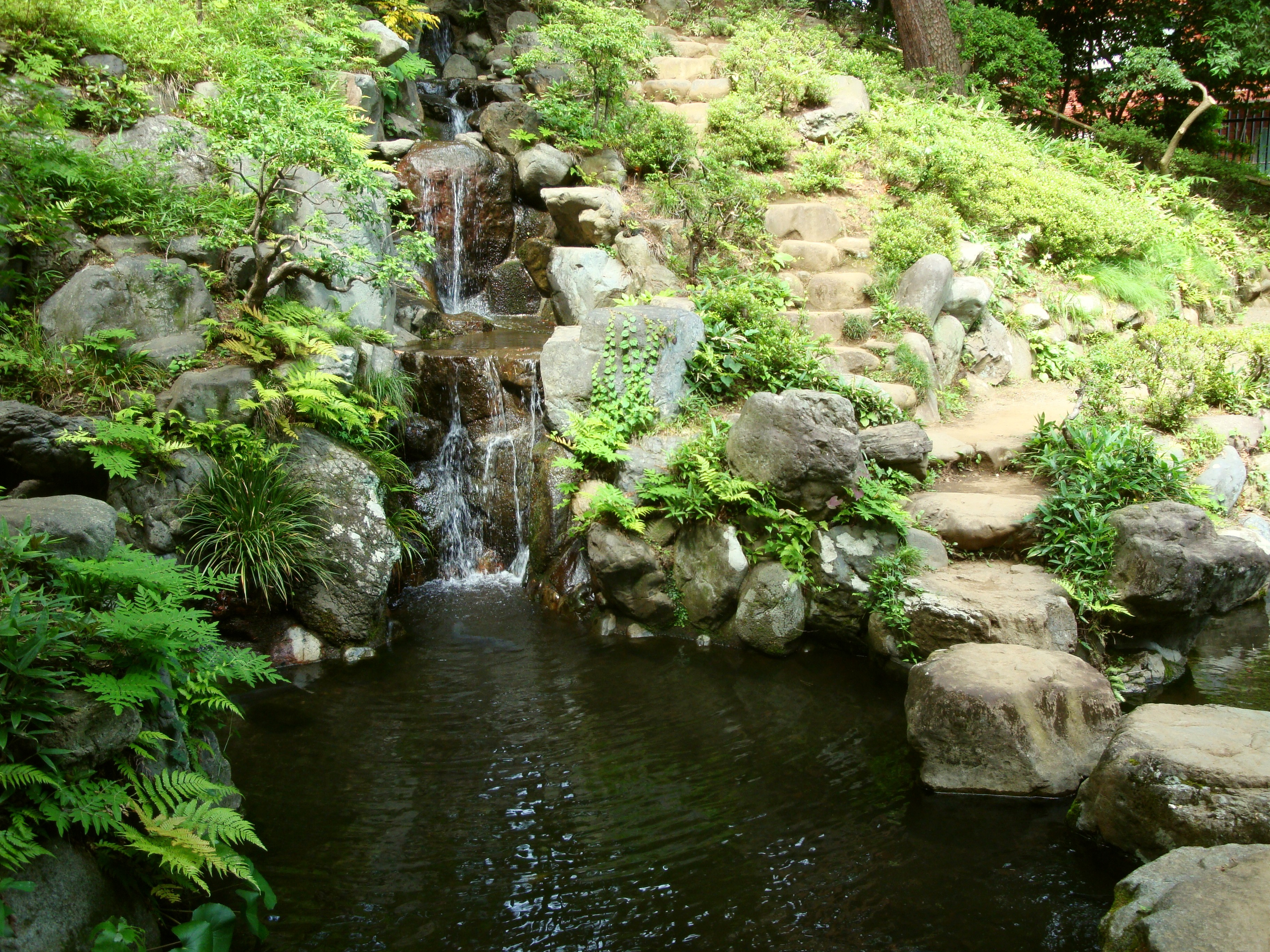
Waterfall
