= Koishikawa Annex, The University Museum, The University of Tokyo =

Natural history museum in Japan

Coordinates: 35°43′17″N 139°44′28″E

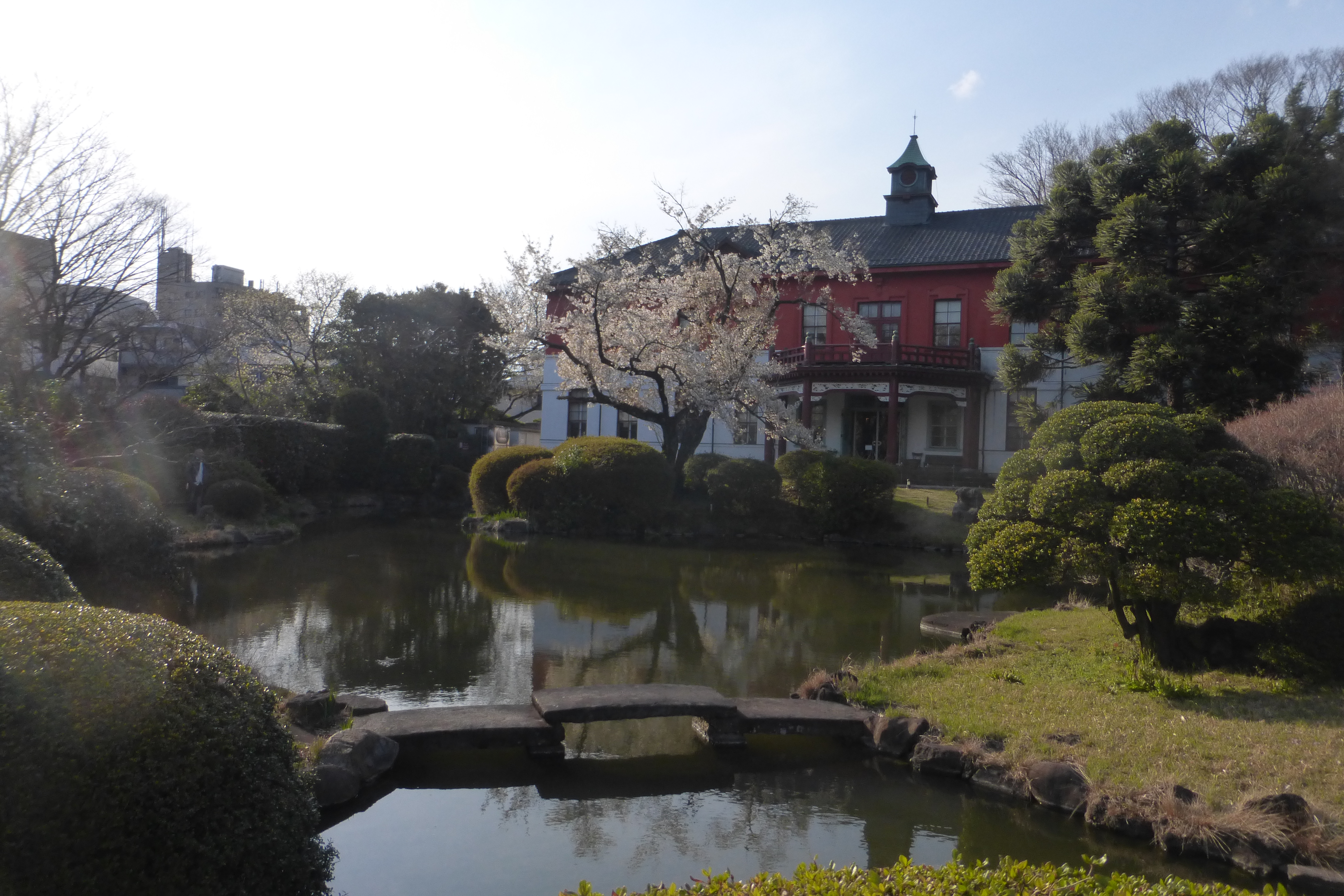

The Koishikawa Annex, The University Museum, The University of Tokyo (東京大学総合研究博物館 小石川分館, Tōkyō-daigaku sōgō kenkyū hakubutsukan Koishikawa bunkan) is a museum located in Hakusan Bunkyo, Tokyo, Japan. It is the oldest building of the University of Tokyo, and is open to general public as the annex of The University Museum. It was formerly used as a medical school. The building was dismantled in 1965, and in 1969, it was moved and restored in Koishikawa Botanical Garden. As collection, there are the natural history specimen collections, the animal specimen collection of Chartering foreigner teacher E Morse's immediate pupils, the art and science specimen collection of Prof. Mitake Hide, member of the engineering model of Kōbushō Kōgakuryō.

Many bronze statues of Tokyo University professors exist in this building.
