= National Museum of Territory and Sovereignty =

- 領土・主権展示館
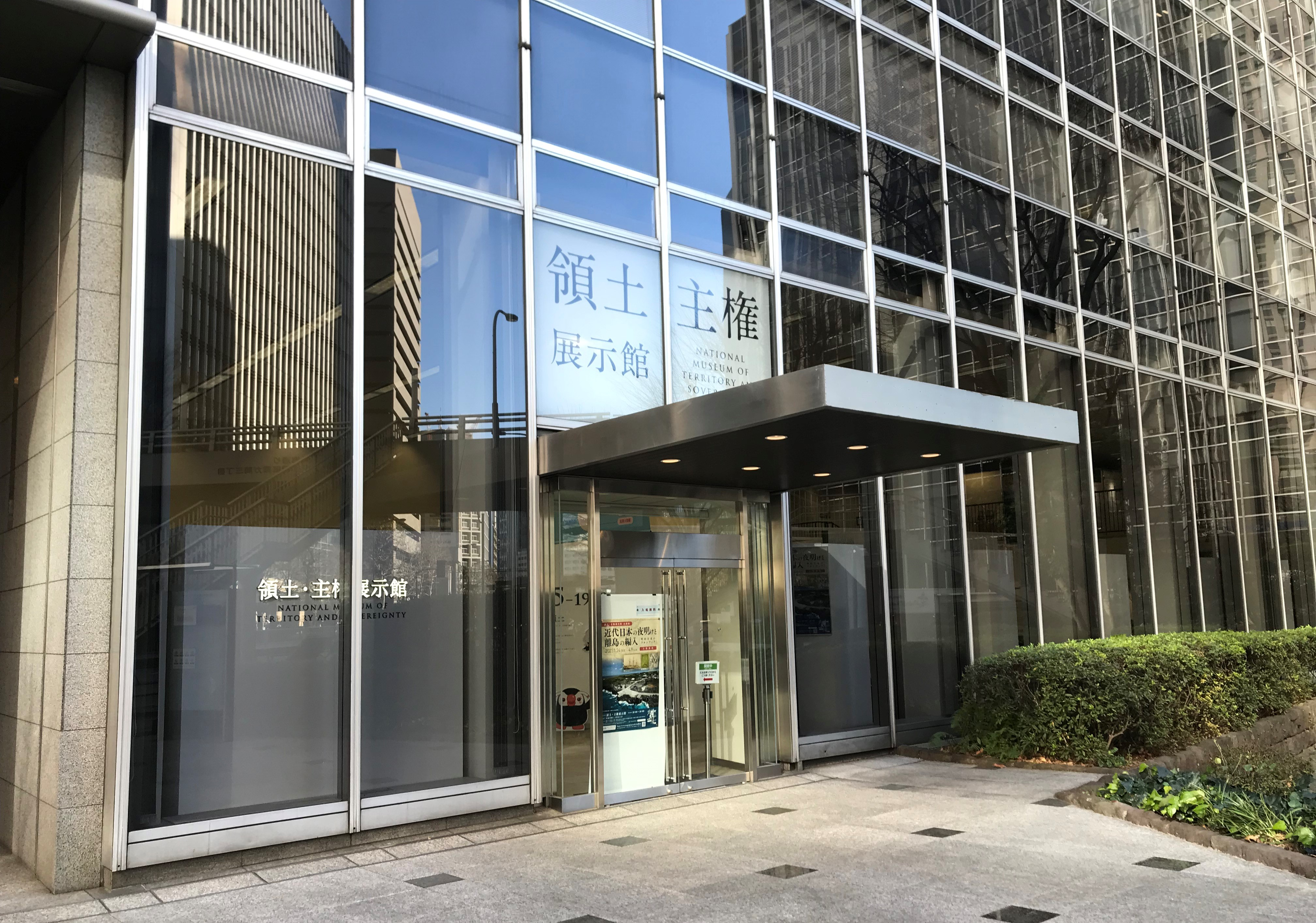
- National Museum of Territory and Sovereignty
- Established: January 25, 2018 (permanent display) (Heisei 30)
- Location: 〒 100-0013 3-8-1 Kasumigaseki, Chiyoda-ku, Tokyo, Japan
- Type: History museum
- Public transit access: Tokyo Metro:, Toranomon, and others
- Website: National Museum of Territory and Sovereignty

The National Museum of Territory and Sovereignty (Japanese: 領土・主権展示館) is located in the Toranomon Mitsui Building in Chiyoda-ku, Tokyo, and covers Takeshima, Senkaku Islands, and the Northern Territories. It is a museum about Japanese territorial rights issues.

== Overview ==
The museum exhibits are designed to educate the public concerning Japanese territories and sovereignties, Takeshima in Oki-no-shima, Oki District, Shimane Prefecture, Senkaku Islands in Ishigaki-shi, Okinawa Prefecture, and public awareness on sovereignty issues in the Northern Territories of Hokkaido, as part of a communication to the international community was opened on January 25, 2018, by the Government of Japan's Cabinet Secretariat and the Territorial and Sovereignty Planning and Coordination Office to display explanatory materials.

In May 2019, the move to the first floor of the Toranomon Mitsui Building was announced.

The relocated exhibit was opened to the press on January 20, 2020, and opened to the public on the 21st. The exhibition area is about seven times larger than before, and the number of exhibits on the northern territory, which was previously small, has increased significantly. Prior to the relocation, the museum was closed on Saturdays and Sundays, but now it remains open on the weekends and is closed on Mondays.

== Exhibits ==
In addition to exhibiting panels and evidence (replicas) explaining Takeshima and the Senkaku Islands as grounds for Japan's territory, both historically and internationally, and rebuttal to the allegations of South Korea, China and Taiwan, and that they are in a position to solve problems through dialogue.

Since there were already permanent exhibition facilities in Sapporo and Shibetsu in Hokkaido, there was very little content on northern territorial issues during the municipal assembly hall era, but since the relocation to the Toranomon Mitsui Building, exhibits on the northern territories have significantly increased.

In addition to the exhibits, related videos can be shown and materials can be viewed on a personal computer.

They also distribute English and Chinese related pamphlets on Takeshima and Senkaku issues.

== Visiting ==
- Hours: Tuesday-Sunday 10:00–18:00
- Closed: Mondays, New Year's holidays (December 29 – January 3)
- Admission fee: Free
- Parking: None
- Photography: allowed

== Accessibility ==
- 5 minute walk from Kasumigaseki Station (Tokyo) (A13 exit) on the Tokyo Metro Marunouchi Line Hibiya Line Chiyoda Line
- 1 minute walk from Tokyo Metro Ginza Line-Toranomon Station (Exit 3)

== Nearby ==
- Toranomon Hospital
- Japan Patent Office
- Dokdo Museum
