= Toguri Museum =

Coordinates: 35°39′41″N 139°41′34″E

Toguri Museum of Art (Japanese: 戸栗美術館) is located in Shoto, Shibuya, Tokyo. It mainly preserves and exhibits Asian ceramics collected by the businessperson Toru Toguri. The museum is located approximately 15 minutes walk from Shibuya Station. The main collections are Hizen porcelain from Imari and Nabeshima, as well as Chinese and Korean ceramics. The collection has approximately 7,000 art pieces in its collection.

== History ==
The museum was founded in November 1987 and is one of the few museums in Japan dedicated to ceramics.

== Publications ==
The museum has published a number of books in Japanese language about its collection of ceramics:

- Oriental Blue and White (1988)
- Old Imari Ware (1991)
- Early Imari Ware (1997)
- Toguri Museum, Best of Collection: Chinese Porcelain (2022)
