= Fumio Asakura =

Japanese sculptor

Asakura Fumio 朝倉 文夫
- 朝倉 文夫
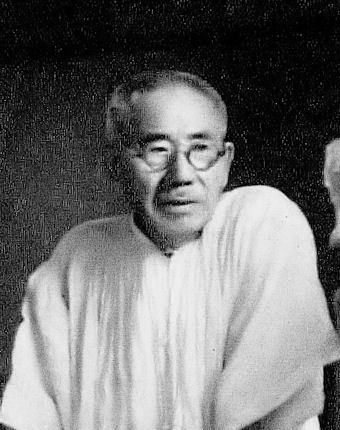
- Born: March 1, 1883; Oita Prefecture, Japan
- Died: April 18, 1964 (aged 81); Tokyo, Japan

Fumio Asakura (朝倉 文夫, Asakura Fumio; March 1, 1883 – April 18, 1964) was a Western-style Japanese sculptor, known as the father of modern Japanese sculpture and referred to as the "Rodin of Japan". He was a prolific artist, and his work spanned the Meiji, Taishō, and Shōwa periods of Japanese history.

== Biography ==
Asakura was born in 1883 and raised in the village of Asaji (now part of the city of Bungo-ōno) in Oita Prefecture in western Kyushu, Japan. He traveled to Tokyo to study art at Tokyo School of Fine Arts (東京美術学校, Tōkyō Bijutsu Gakkō), now the Tokyo University of the Arts, graduating from department of sculpture in 1907. He set up a studio in Tokyo's Yanaka neighborhood, and began his sculpting career, entering the annual Bunten competitions of the Japan Art Academy (日本芸術院, Nihon Geijutsu-in). He drew attention almost immediately, winning prizes for eight consecutive Bunten exhibitions, beginning in 1908 with second-place for his sculpture Yami (闇, or "Darkness") and in 1910 for Hakamori (墓守, or "The Gravekeeper"). He continued to create and exhibit Western-style sculptures, especially nudes, at the various official art exhibitions, and was also known for his portrait sculptures of notable people, such as of Shigenobu Okuma.

He was appointed to the Imperial Fine Arts Academy (Teikoku Bijutsu-in, now the Japan Art Academy) in 1919 and became a professor of his alma mater, Tokyo School of Fine Arts, in 1921, training many young sculptors there and at his own Asakura Choso Juku ("Asakura School of Plastic Arts") from 1920 to 1944. He was awarded the Order of Culture in 1948.

His daughters Setsu Asakura (朝倉摂, 1922-2014) and Kyokō Asakura (朝倉響子, 1925-2016) became artists in their own right. Setsu became a painter and stage designer, and Kyoko became a sculptor. "[Kyoko] Asakura's subjects are typically women. Her bronze sculptures are moving and poetic, with a striking intensity."

Asakura died in 1964 in Tokyo, aged 81.

== Works ==
According to Penelope Mason's History of Japanese Art:

One theme that Asakura frequently treated was the feline form – the cat being held by the scruff of the neck; the cat crouching, lying in wait for its prey; the cat eating its catch. The Suspended Cat of 1909 is a particularly fine example of his work. Although the modeling of the sculpture is strongly three-dimensional, the most impressive aspect of this work is its fidelity to an observed phenomenon. One senses the cat's discomfort and its frustration as it dangles in midair, one cannot help but appreciate it sleek, muscular body.

=== At the National Museum of Modern Art, Tokyo ===
- Man from a Mountain, 1909
- Keeper of a Cemetery, 1910
- Aborigines from Borneo (1), 1911
- Aborigines from Borneo (2)
- Resting Lion, 1944
- Roaring Lion, 1944

== Legacy ==
There are two museums dedicated to his work:

- The Asakura Museum of Sculpture in the Yanaka neighborhood of Taito, Tokyo. The museum, which opened in 1967, preserves Asakura's home and his sculpture studio. The three-story studio was built in 1936 of ferroconcrete, and also served as Asakura's private school. It includes the oldest extant roof garden in Tokyo, where Asakura's students learned gardening as part of the teaching process, intended to sharpen their senses and familiarize them with nature.
- The Fumio Asakura Museum of Sculpture in Asakura's hometown of Asaji, Ōita, Bungo-ōno, Ōita Prefecture.

== Personal life ==
Asakura had two daughters, Setsu Asakura, stage designer and painter, and Kyoko Asakura, a sculptor.

== See also ==
- Asakura Museum of Sculpture
