= Asakura Museum of Sculpture =

- 台東区立朝倉彫塑館
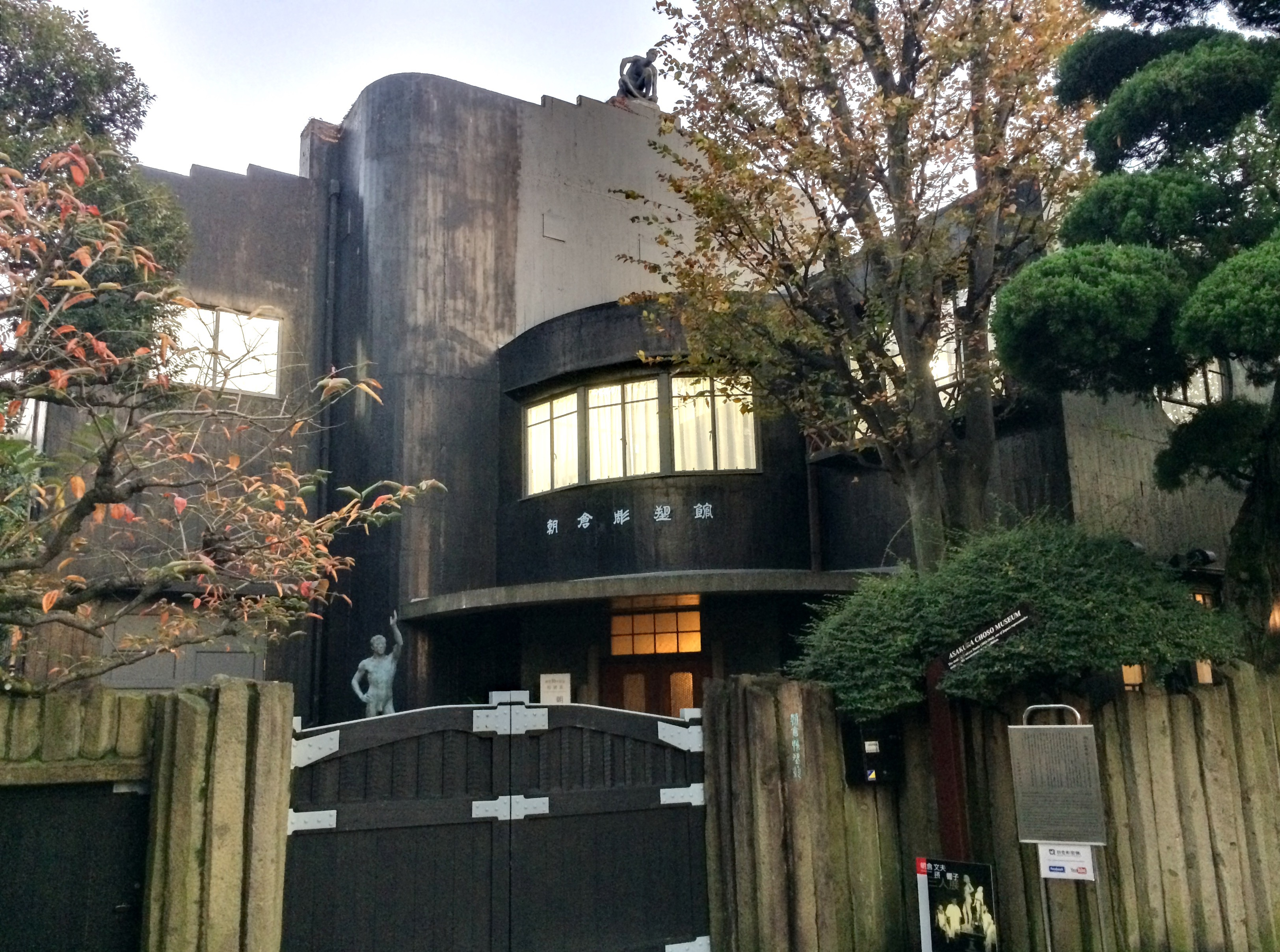
- Entrance to the museum
- Former name: Sakura Carving and Sculptures Museum
- Established: 1967
- Location: Taitō Ward, Tokyo, Japan
- Coordinates: 35.726879°N 139.768543°E
- Type: Art museum
- Public transit access: Nishi-Nippori Station
- Website: https://www.taitogeibun.net/asakura (in Japanese)

Asakura Museum of Sculpture (台東区立朝倉彫塑館 Taitō kuritsu asakura chōsokan) or Asakura Choso Museum is an art museum in Tokyo, Japan, that showcases the sculptures and life work of Fumio Asakura (1883–1965). It is located in the Yanaka neighborhood of Taitō ward. The museum opened in 1967 after Asakura's death.

Fumio Asakura was born in the town of Asaji in the Oita Prefecture in Japan. He moved to Tokyo where his brother lived when he was nineteen. Influenced by his brother's sculpting talent, Asakura attended the Tokyo School of Fine Arts (now Tokyo University of the Arts) which propelled him towards his sculpting career. He focused on realism and was influenced by the naturalistic works of French sculptors like Bourdelle, Mailliol and most of all, Auguste Rodin. His work includes both human figures and animals, especially cats, which he had a deep love for and was inspired by his own pet cat. He is now considered the father of modern Japanese sculpture.

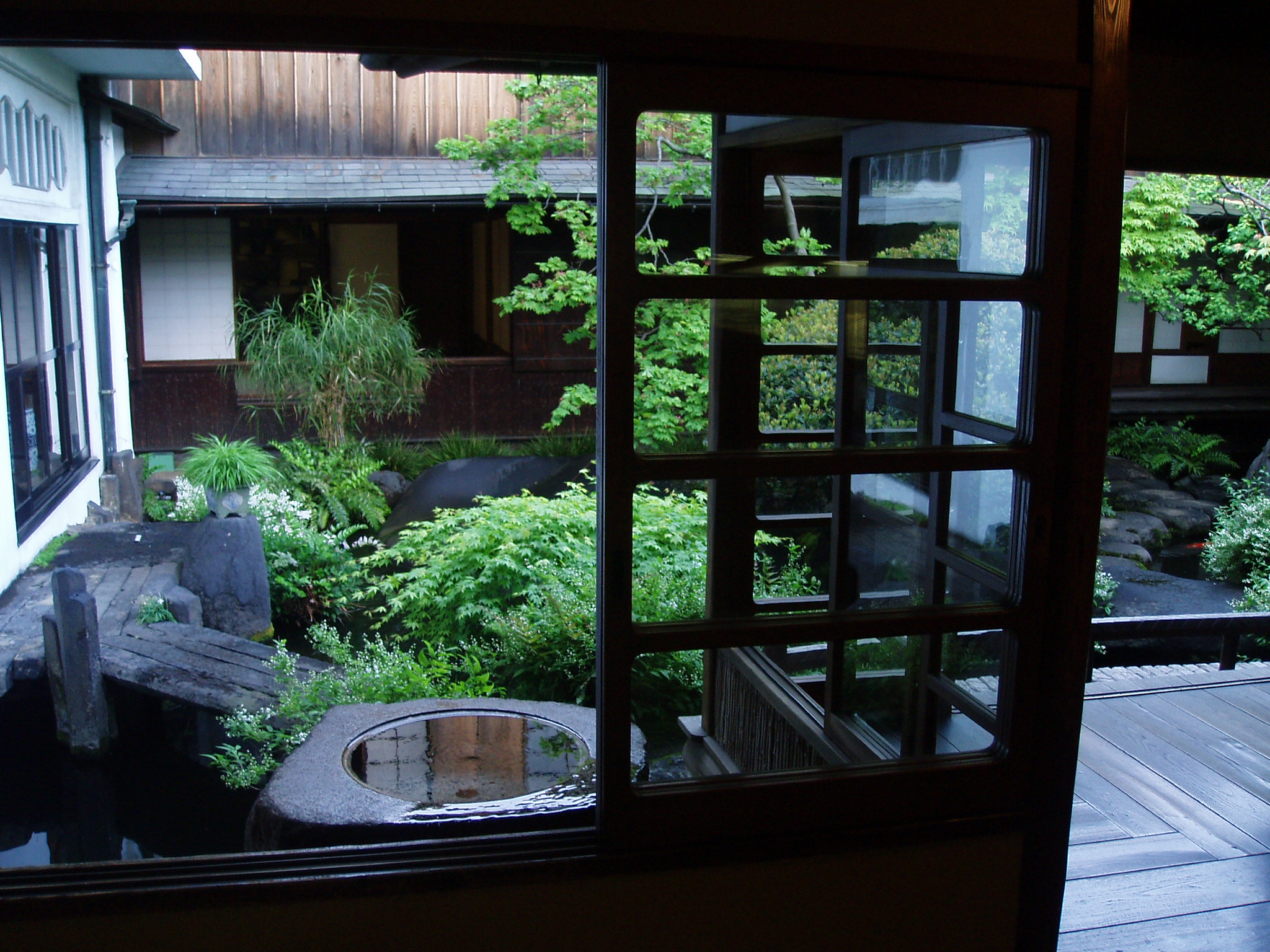
Another part of the museum

== History ==
The museum is located in Asakura's three-story home and sculpture studio. The studio was built of ferroconcrete with a high ceiling and skylights to let in the natural light, with the walls painted a light-brown color for a warmer effect. The studio also served as the Asakura Choso Juku (Asakura School of Plastic Arts) from 1920 to 1944. The building includes the oldest extant roof garden in Tokyo, where the students learned gardening. They grew radishes, turnips, and tomatoes to sharpen their senses and become more familiar with nature. The third-floor Orchid Room, formerly a greenhouse for Asakura's collection of orchids, is now a gallery displaying works focusing on one of his favorite subjects, cats.

== The museum today ==
After Asakura's death, his family opened the building to the public, and since then it has been managed by the Taito ward government. In 2001, the building was registered as cultural property by the government, and in 2008, both the courtyard and rooftop garden were registered as a national place of scenic beauty. In April 2009, the building was closed for renovations, due to signs of aging, in hopes of restoring it to the condition it had during Asakura's life. The storehouse next to the building was removed to let sunlight illuminate the building again. The walls of the residence were restored using colors and materials that were used in the original building. The museum reopened in October.
