= University Museum (University of Tokyo) =

University museum in Tokyo, Japan

- 東京大学総合研究博物館

- Location within Special wards of Tokyo
- Established: April 1, 1966
- Location: Hongō, Bunkyō, Tokyo, Japan
- Coordinates: 35.70866°N 139.76118°E
- Director: Hideki Endō
- Owner: The University of Tokyo
- Website: Official website
- Map

The University Museum at the University of Tokyo (東京大学総合研究博物館, Tōkyō daigaku sōgō kenkyū hakubutsukan; UMUT) is a museum in Tokyo, Japan. Although there had been museums affiliated with the University of Tokyo since its establishment in 1877, UMUT was established in 1966 to maintain, organise, and exhibit the vast collection of the university. Today, UMUT works with preservation, research, and exhibitions for the general public.

== History ==
The University Museum was established on April 1, 1966 under the name the University Museum (東京大学総合研究資料館, Tōkyō daigaku sōgō kenkyū shiryōkan). In 1984 an extension of the main museum was built to house a dedicated exhibition space. On May 11, 1996 the museum was reorganized and got its current name. While the name in English remained the same, the new Japanese name reflected the ambition to work more on showing the collection to the public. The three last characters in both names could be translated as museum, but the old name is perhaps better translated as archive. In connection to the reorganization a new extension (2996 m^{2}) to the main building was completed in 1995. In 2001 the old faculty of medicine building, which was relocated to Koishikawa Botanical Garden in 1969, was opened as a new exhibition space. In 2013 the exhibition space Intermediatheque (IMT) was opened in the old Central Post Office next to Tokyo Station. This larger space (~3000 m^{2}) was established in part to show more of the museum collection. In 2014 an exhibition space called "Space Exploration, Education, and Discovery" (SEED) was opened at the TeNQ Space Museum, next to Tokyo Dome.

Mako Komuro, formerly Princess Mako of Akishino, the niece of Emperor Naruhito, worked as a researcher at the museum in 2016. Her father, Crown Prince Akishino, has also worked at the museum and is an honorary fellow.

== Facilities ==
The main building is situated in the south end of Hongō University campus and houses the main collection, as well as offices, research labs and a smaller exhibition space (~600 m^{2}) — the Hall of Inspiration. The museum also has three satellite facilities with exhibitions.

1. Koishikawa Annex – The old faculty of medicine building which was relocated to Koishikawa Botanical Garden in 1969.
2. Intermediatheque – exhibition space next to Tokyo Station with permanent and temporary exhibitions. Many old specimen cabinets are used for the displays.
3. SEED, TeNQ – exhibition next to Tokyo Dome focused on space exploration and the universe.

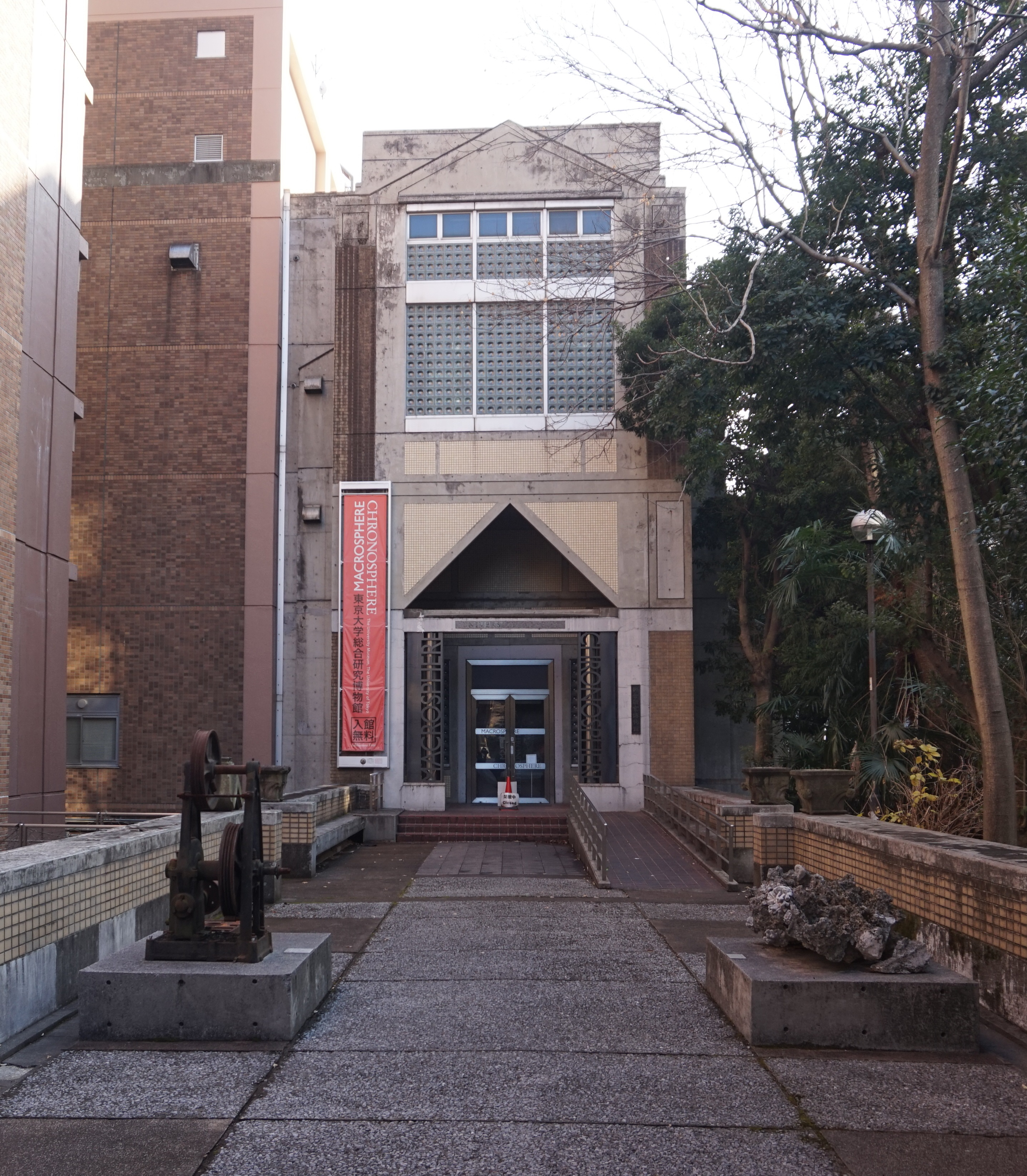
Entrance to the main building of The University Museum

== Collection ==
UMUT has a main collection of 4 million items. It furthermore has several special collections. One such collection is the University Herbarium which holds over 1.7 million specimens. This herbarium has a large collection of specimens from the Himalayas and East Asia. The Index Herbariorum code assigned to this herbarium is TI, which is used when citing specimens. The museum collection originates from the time of the founding of the University of Tokyo in 1877 and some parts of the collection predate that as it comes from older institutions. Some of the mechanical displays now shown at Intermediatheque come e.g. from the Imperial College of Engineering which was incorporated into the new University of Tokyo. In the photography album of The University of Tokyo published in 1900 by Ogawa Kazumasa several images depict the collections and exhibitions of the university faculties.

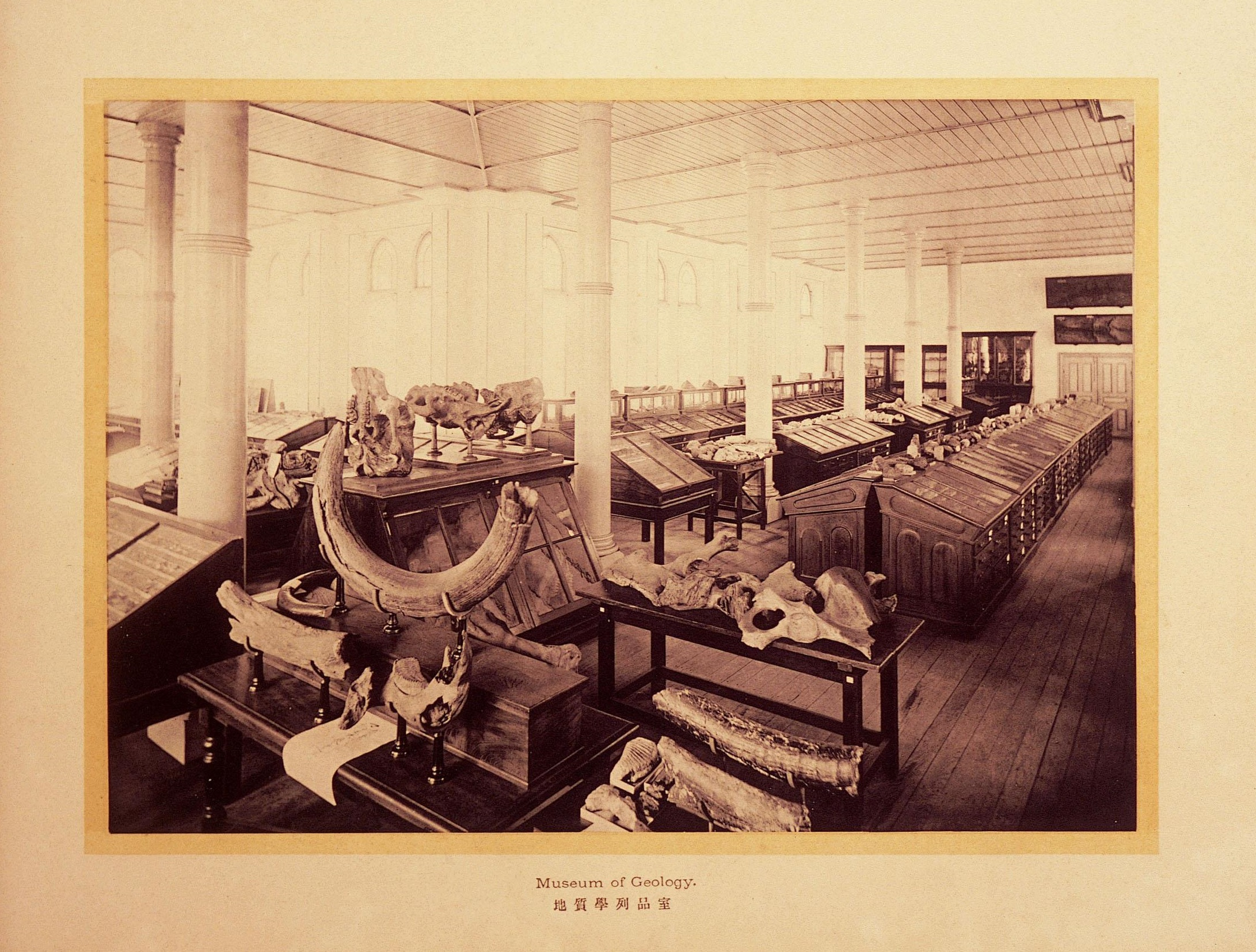
Museum of Geology at The University of Tokyo (ca. 1900)

== Publications ==
UMUT has two main publication series, the Research Bulletin and the Material Reports. UMUT has also published a newsletter since 1996, Ouroboros (ISSN 1342-3614), with 3 issues per year. Between 1984 and 1995 another series of newsletters was published.

== Directors ==
The directorship is held by one of the professors at UMUT.

=== 1966-1996 ===
1. 1966–1968: Takeo Watanabe
2. 1968–1971: Hiroshi Hara
3. 1971–1973: Hirotarō Ōta
4. 1973–1976: Takeshi Sekino
5. 1975–1977: Nobuo Egami
6. 1978–1980: Naosuke Watanabe
7. 1980–1984: Eizo Inagaki
8. 1984–1985: Kazurō Haniwara
9. 1985–1987: Yukio Nose
10. 1987–1989: Toshihisa Takeuchi
11. 1989–1993: Takeshi Yōrō
12. 1993–1996: Masanori Aoyagi
13. 1996–1996: Yoshihiro Hayashi

=== 1996- ===
1. 1996–1999: Yoshihiro Hayashi
2. 1999–2001: Akihiko Kawaguchi
3. 2001–2006: Susumu Takahashi
4. 2006–2010: Yoshihiro Hayashi
5. 2010–2017: Yoshiaki Nishino
6. 2017–2020: Gen Suwa
7. 2020–2026: Yoshihiro Nishiaki
8. 2026– : Hideki Endō

== See also ==
- The University of Tokyo
- Koishikawa Annex
- Campus of the University of Tokyo
