= Campus of Kyushu University =

College in Fukuoka, Japan

Kyushu University (九州大学 Kyūshū Daigaku) in Fukuoka, Japan, was established as Fukuoka Medical College in 1903, which was affiliated with Kyoto Imperial University. Kyushu Imperial University was founded in 1911. In 1947, after World War II ended, the university changed its name to Kyushu University. The university is composed of six campuses: Chikushi, Hospital, Ito, Ohashi, Hakozaki, and Beppu. There are numerous historic buildings dating back to the many phases of history the university has seen. The Third Residential Complex on-campus has a western-style design and is reserved for foreign students. The complex dates back to 1924 and has been designated as a Municipal Cultural Property.

== Hospital (Maidashi) Campus ==
The Hospital campus is the oldest campus and has many historic structures. It is located in Maidashi, which was once a quarter on the outskirts of Fukuoka-City, but nowadays is part of Higashi-ku.

=== University Hospital ===
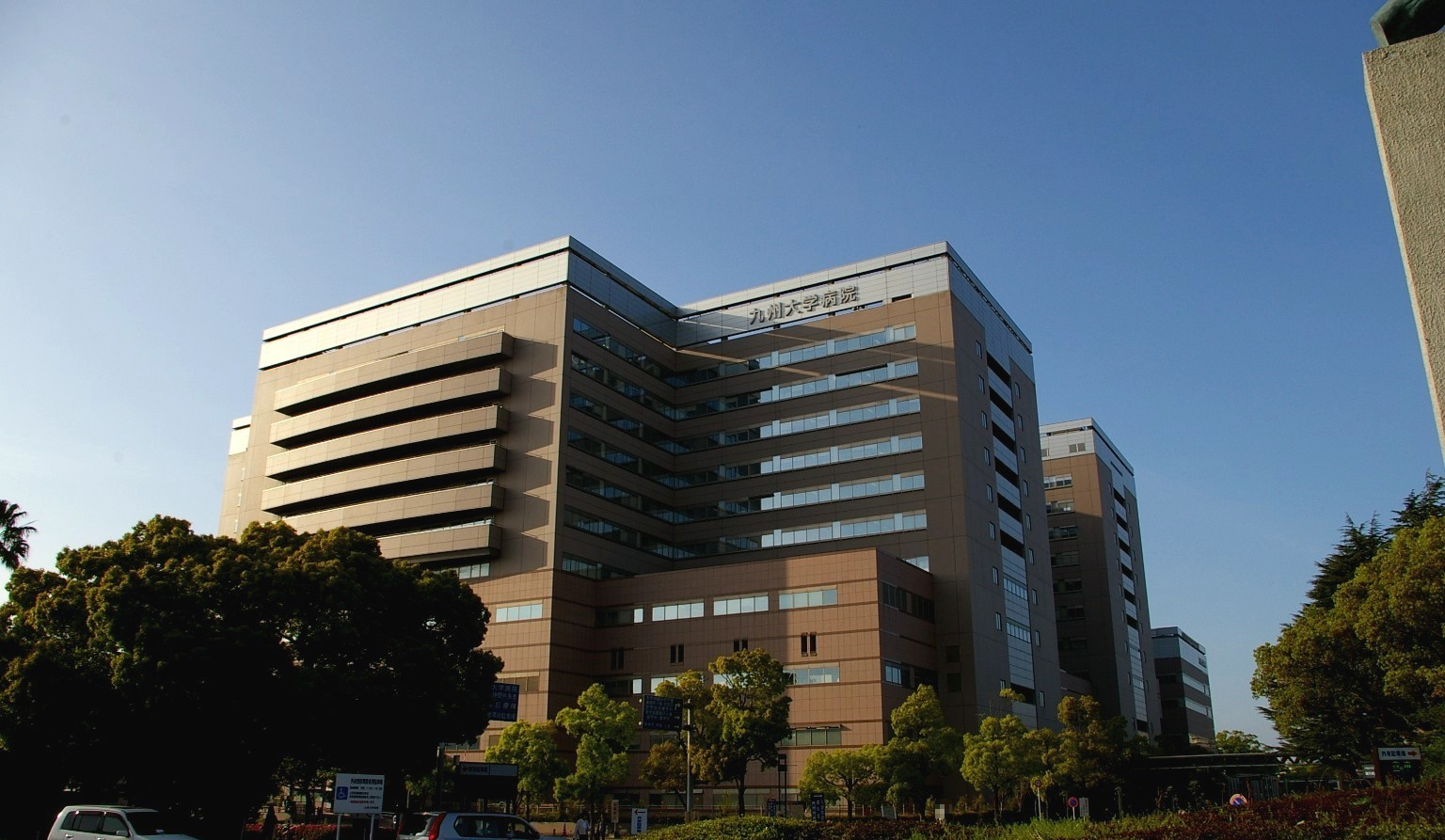
Medical Center

The new University Hospital was constructed in three stages. It has twelve floors; eleven are above ground and one is underground, with a total floor space of approximately 118,000 square metres (1,270,000 sq ft). Construction started in April 1998 and was finished by March 2008. It is the largest hospital under the jurisdiction of the Ministry of Education, Culture, Sports, Science, and Technology, and the first one to have a seismic isolation system. The Outpatient Ward has six floors, five above ground and one underground, and houses 28 departments. The Westwing Building was constructed in March 2008. It houses the Yusho Dioxine Research and Care Center and the Training Center for Minimally Invasive Surgery. The Tumor Center was completed in 1985. The Betatron Ward was constructed in 1967 and closed in 2000.

=== Facilities ===
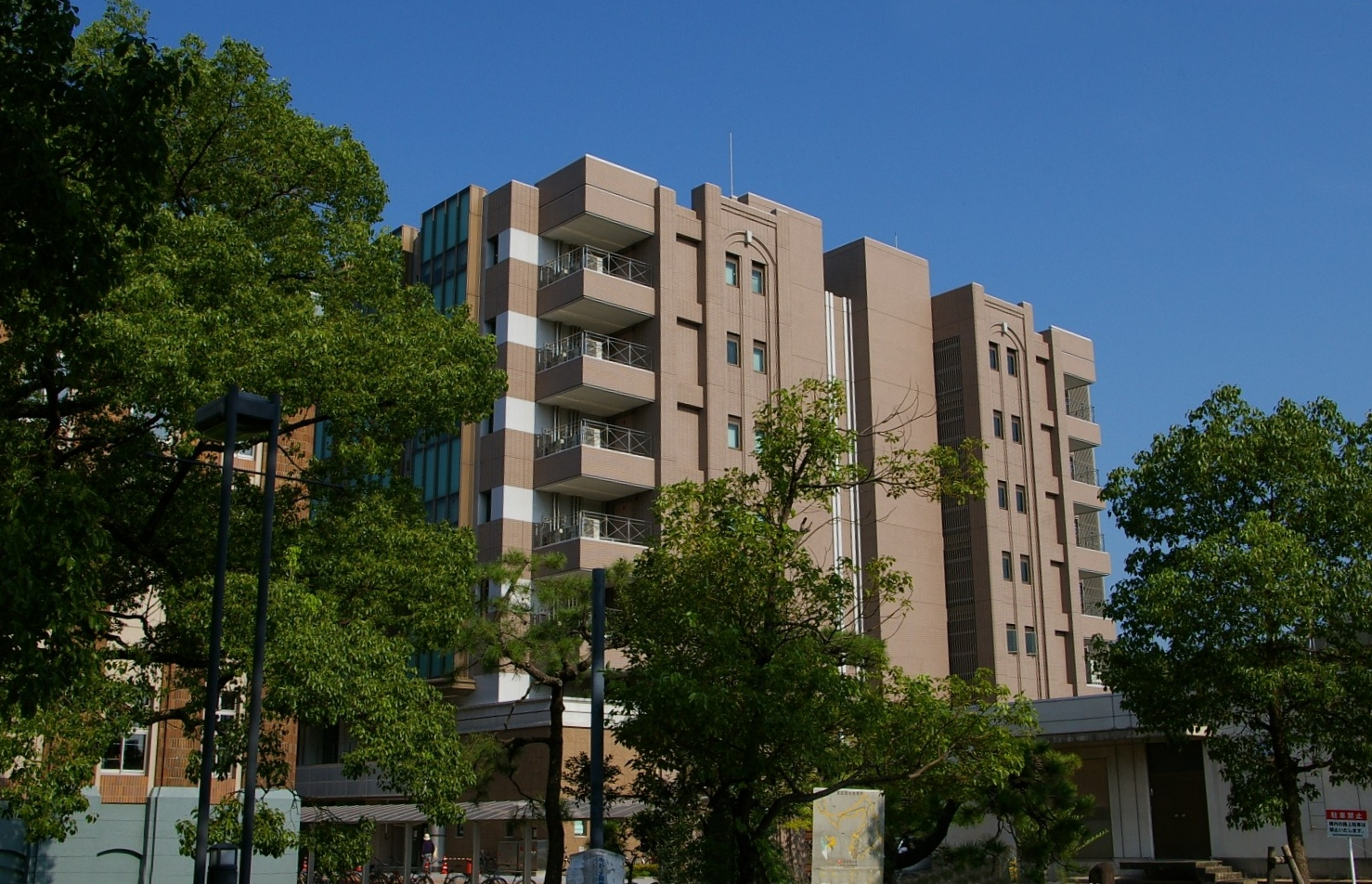
Collective Research II

Kyushu University Station-I for Collaborative Research has a total floor space of 5,194 square metres (55,910 sq ft) and is built of steel-reinforced concrete and has nine floors. It was established in March 2000, and construction was overseen by Sumitomo Mitsui Construction, design management was done by So Kikaku Sekkei Ltd. Construction of the Kyushu University Station-II for Collaborative Research was overseen by the Mizoe Kensetsu Corporation. It is a steel-reinforced concrete seven-story building with a total area of 10,563 square metres (113,700 sq ft). The Kyushu University Biomedical Research Station is a nine-story building and was completed in October 2004. Its construction was overseen by a joint-venture group in cooperation with Obayashi Corporation, Wakachiku Construction Corporation and Zenkōmuten Corporation.

There are several facilities for the bodies of anatomical donors. The Charnel House is a Japanese-style house built in 1939, but nowadays there is a funeral chapel in the new Hospital Building. Donor bodies are cremated in a crematorium. There is also a monument demonstrating the gratitude and respect for those who donated their body for medical research and education.

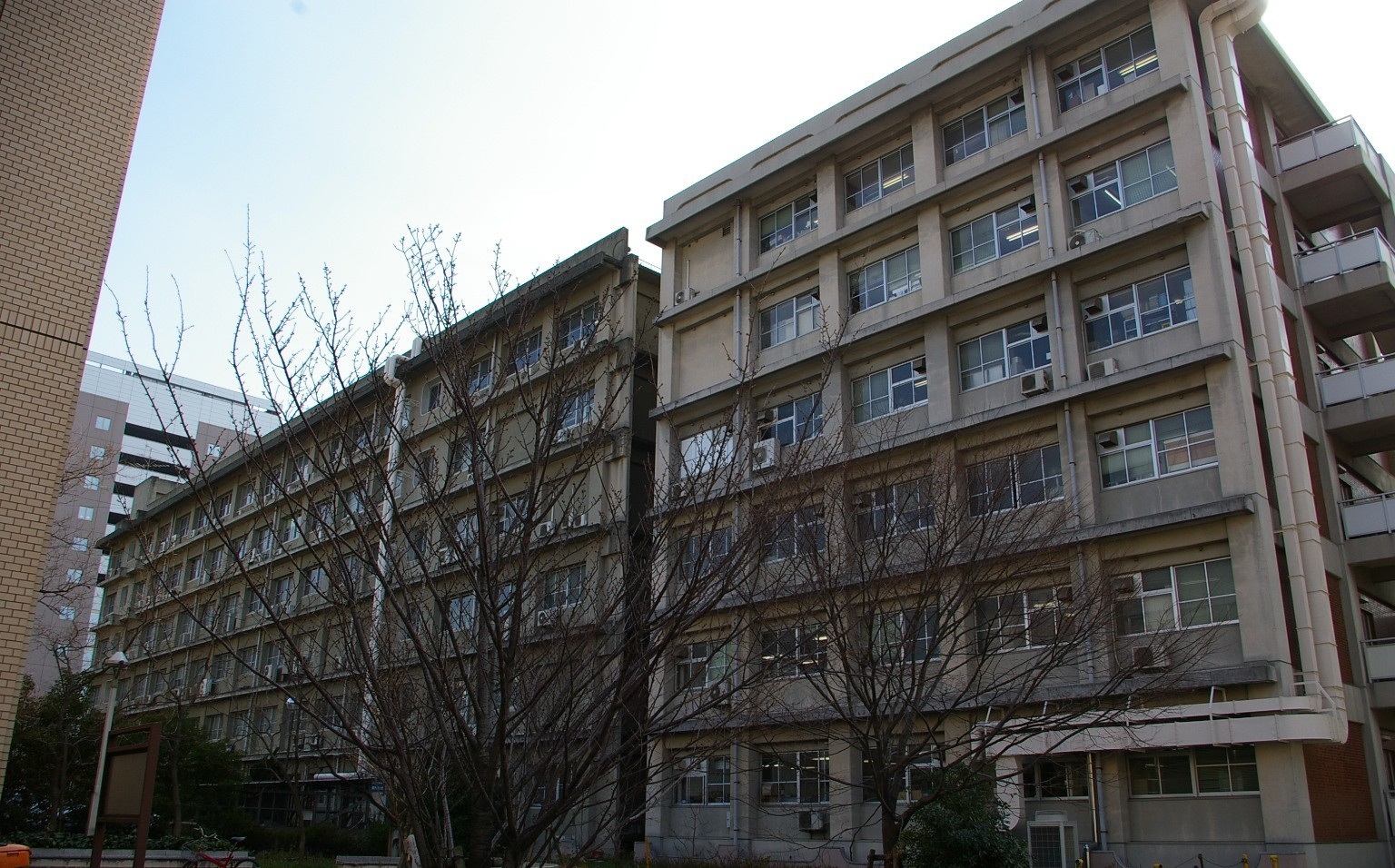
Clinical Science Medicine Building B

The Faculty of Medical Sciences Building A of Clinical Sciences was constructed in 1975 and has a ground-floor area of 5,828 square metres (62,730 sq ft). Building B was constructed in 1976 and has a ground-floor area of 6,874 square metres (73,990 sq ft). The Clinical machine wing / autopsy suite was constructed in 1976. The Department of Health Sciences in the Faculty of Medicine, formerly Kyushu University Medical Junior College, was constructed in 1981 and has a ground-floor area of 407 square metres (4,380 sq ft). The Faculty of Pharmaceutical Science was constructed in 1967 and has a ground-floor area of 7,977 square metres (85,860 sq ft)

The Medical Library was constructed in 1956. Centennial Hall (Hyakunen Kōdō) makes up the medical school. This facility is used for congresses, conferences and all kinds of academic meetings. There is also a cafeteria. Its construction was completed in 2008. The Kubo-Memorial-Building (Kubo Kinenkan) is a two-story concrete building is the first museum for the History of Medicine in Japan. The Kubo-Memorial-Building was donated to Inokichi Kubo, the first professor and founder of the Department of Otorhinolaryngology, by the members of the Shisan-kai, an alumnus association of the Kubo school, on 8 May 1927 at the occasion of the 20th anniversary of the foundation of the school, and later donated to Kyushu Imperial University. In 1999 and 2003 the building was renovated. The gymnasium was built in 1965 and has a ground-floor area of 1,083 square metres (11,660 sq ft). Repair work to the tennis courts' artificial grass was done in 2009 by Kofu-field Company. The Alumni House was constructed in 1967 as a part of the 50th-anniversary celebrations of Kyushu University. A small lecture hall was added in 1980.

The Foreign Visitors' Quarters were constructed in 1967. The Nurses' Dormitory provides facilities for nurses, rent-free apartments are one-room style stateroom with bathroom and kitchen. The Himawari nursery (ひまわり保育園) is a day-care center for children of faculty members of Kyushu University on the Maidashi campus. It opened on 24 November 2008.

=== Architecture ===
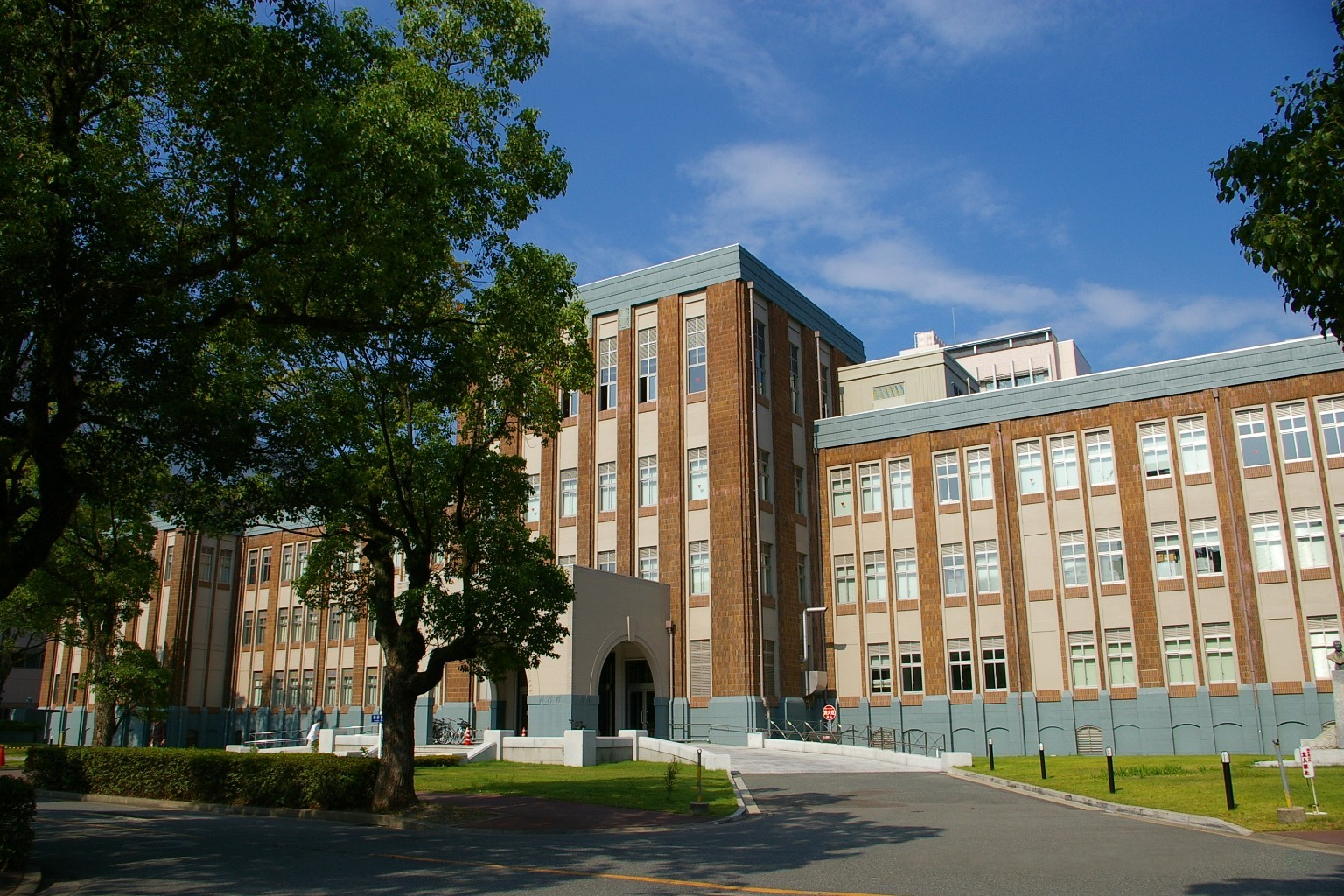
Faculty of Medicine, Basic Medical Research Building A

Many buildings at Kyushu University have an architectural style dating back to the Imperial University era. Basic Medical Research Building A was formerly the first, second, and third medical classrooms as well as the hospital ward of Kyushu Imperial University Medical School. These buildings were designed by Engo Iwasaki and Ken Kurata and construction was completed in April 1931. Since their renovation, the ground floor houses have been used as a cafeteria. Basic Medical Research Building B was formerly the School of Forensic Medicine, Bacteriology, and Hygiene. This three-story building was constructed in 1935 by the Kaneko Group. Dental School Clinical Research Building was formerly the Dental Surgery and Orthopedic Surgery Building. This building, designed by Shūzō Kunitake, was completed in 1934. The gatehouse at the main gate was formerly the gatehouse of Kyoto Imperial University Fukuoka Medical School. This tile-roofed wooden house is the oldest remaining structure in Kyushu University. It was designed by the local office of the Education Ministry's architecture department and built in 1903. The First Surgery Department and Ward is a three-story concrete building and was designed by Ken Kurata and completed in May 1927. After eight decades it was dismantled.

=== Memorial Streets ===
Generally, all former Imperial Universities have statues commemorating famous alumni and professors. On the Maidashi campus of Kyushu University, streets are named after them. Ōmori Street runs east and west from the main gate. Ōmori Street honors professor Ōmori Harutoyo, the first president of Fukuoka Medical School, the forerunner of Kyushu Imperial University Medical School. Miyairi Street runs from north to south from the intersection with Ōmori Street. Miyairi Street honors Keinosuke Miyairi, a professor at Kyushu Imperial University Medical School and a well-known researcher of parasites and sanitarians.

Kubo Street honors Inokichi Kubo, a professor at Kyushu University Medical School and a pioneer of otorhinolaryngology in Japan. Inada Street is named after the bacteriologist Ryukichi Inada was a professor of Kyushu Imperial University Medical School's first department of internal medicine. Tawara Street is dedicated to the pathologist Sunao Tawara, who was a professor at Fukuoka Medical School and is known for his pioneering research on the conduction system of the mammalian heart. Hashimoto Street is named for Hakaru Hashimoto, a medical scientist who discovered Hashimoto's thyroiditis. He was the first alumnus of Kyushu Imperial University Medical School.

== Hakozaki Campus ==
The Hakozaki Campus is located about 1 kilometre (0.62 mi) east of the Maidashi Campus. It is scheduled to be relocated to the Ito campus. Kyushu University 50th foundation memorial hall was constructed in 1967 and designed by Kenji Kokichi (光吉健次) and the school and the general architecture design investigation.

=== Architecture ===
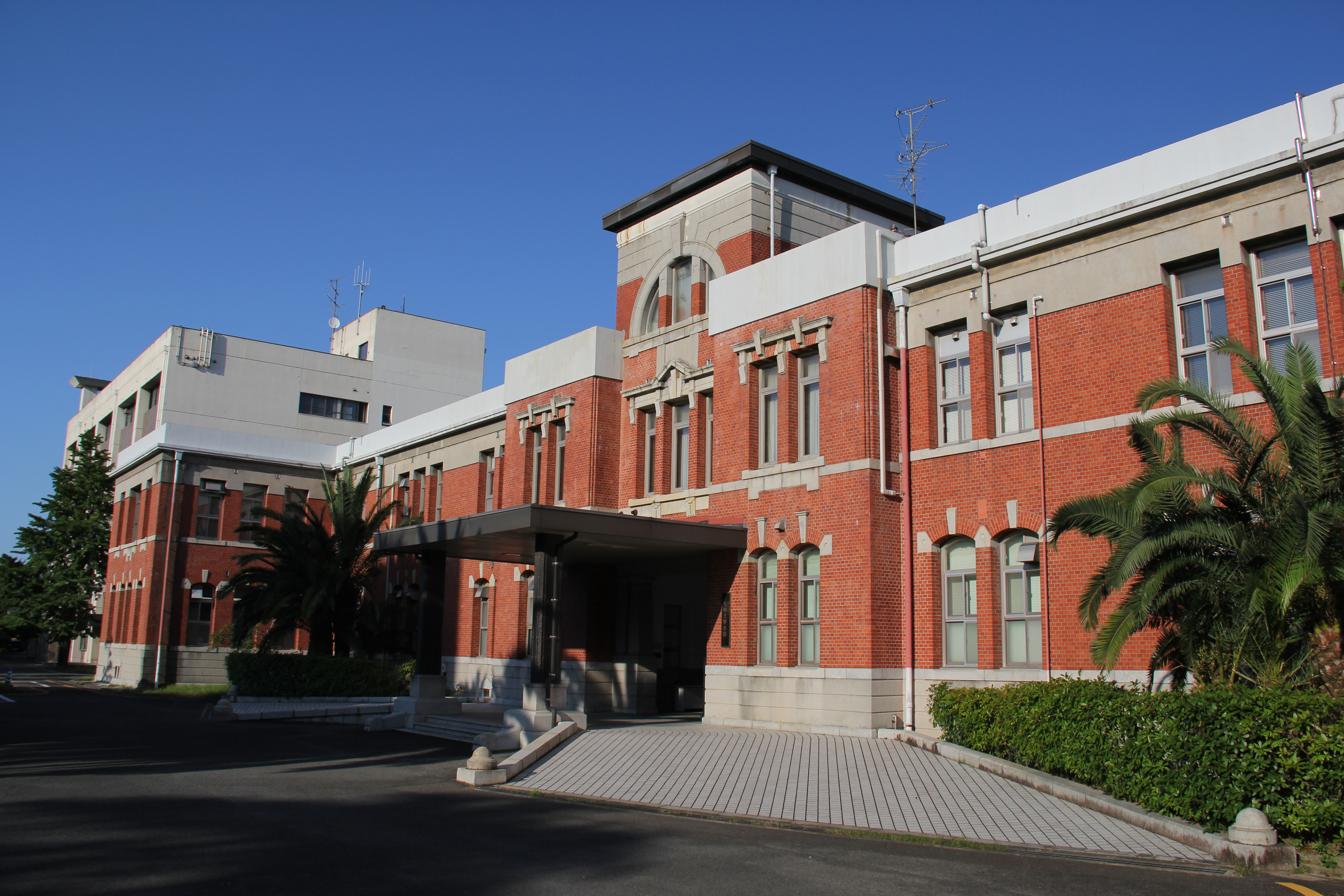
Administration Bureau

Kyushu University Headquarters is a two story brick building designed by Ken Kurata and built in 1925. The building material was reused brick taken from the admission building of the department of technology Kyushu Imperial University, which burned in 1923. After the execution it was used as tentative laboratory and office of the department of technology. In 1928 the head office of University, previously located in Law school building, moved there. In 1922, Albert Einstein visited Japan, and on 25 December, he visited Kyushu Imperial University, when he took a ceremonial photograph with professors in front of the department of technology. The School of Law and Literature's main building is a three-story reinforced concrete building. It was designed by Ken Kurata and constructed in April 1924. The front of this building was constructed by Iwasaki-gumi, and the back of the building by Satake Kōmu-sho. In September 1925, the head office of University removed from the area of medical school to this building, in March 1928 when it moved from the department of technology building it used.

The main building of the engineering faculty of Kyushu Imperial University is a three-story reinforced concrete building and tower. It was designed by Ken Kurata (倉田謙); construction began in November 1928 and was completed in November 1930 by Shimizu gumi (清水組). The office of Kyushu University Institute for Advanced Study (高等研究院 Kōtōkenkyūin) is located in the first-floor room 107. The Department of Aeronautical Engineering in the School of Engineering is located in a three-story reinforced concrete building and tower, which housed the ATCT. It was designed by Harusaburō Shimaoka and Yoshikatsu Tsuboi and was completed in March 1939. The Hakozaki campus' existing main gate was the main gate (九州帝國大學工科大學正門) of Kyushu Imperial University School of Engineering. It was constructed in 1911 and was made of brick.: The gate is a representative architecture of Kyushu University, it is often depicted on the cover of pamphlets from Kyushu University. It was constructed in 1922, but its designer and construction company are not known. The wall of used brick surrounds the science area of Hakozaki campus. It is used as location of the movie K-20 Kaijin nijyu-menso-den (K-20 怪人二十面相・伝) in 2008.

The Admission Center was the psychology school letter of the law during the Kyushu Imperial University era. This is a two story reinforced concrete building and was constructed in March 1927, it was designed by Ken Kurata. The School of Applied Chemistry in the engineering faculty is in a four-story reinforced concrete building, and was completed in October 1927. It was designed by Ken Kurata and Setsuzō Ibara. The Faculty of Agriculture 6th Building is a three-story reinforced concrete building. This building was the Kyushu Imperial University administration building for agricultural chemistry in the agricultural department. It was designed by Shuzo Kunitake (國武周蔵) and constructed by Shimizu gumi (清水組) in September 1938.

== Ito campus ==
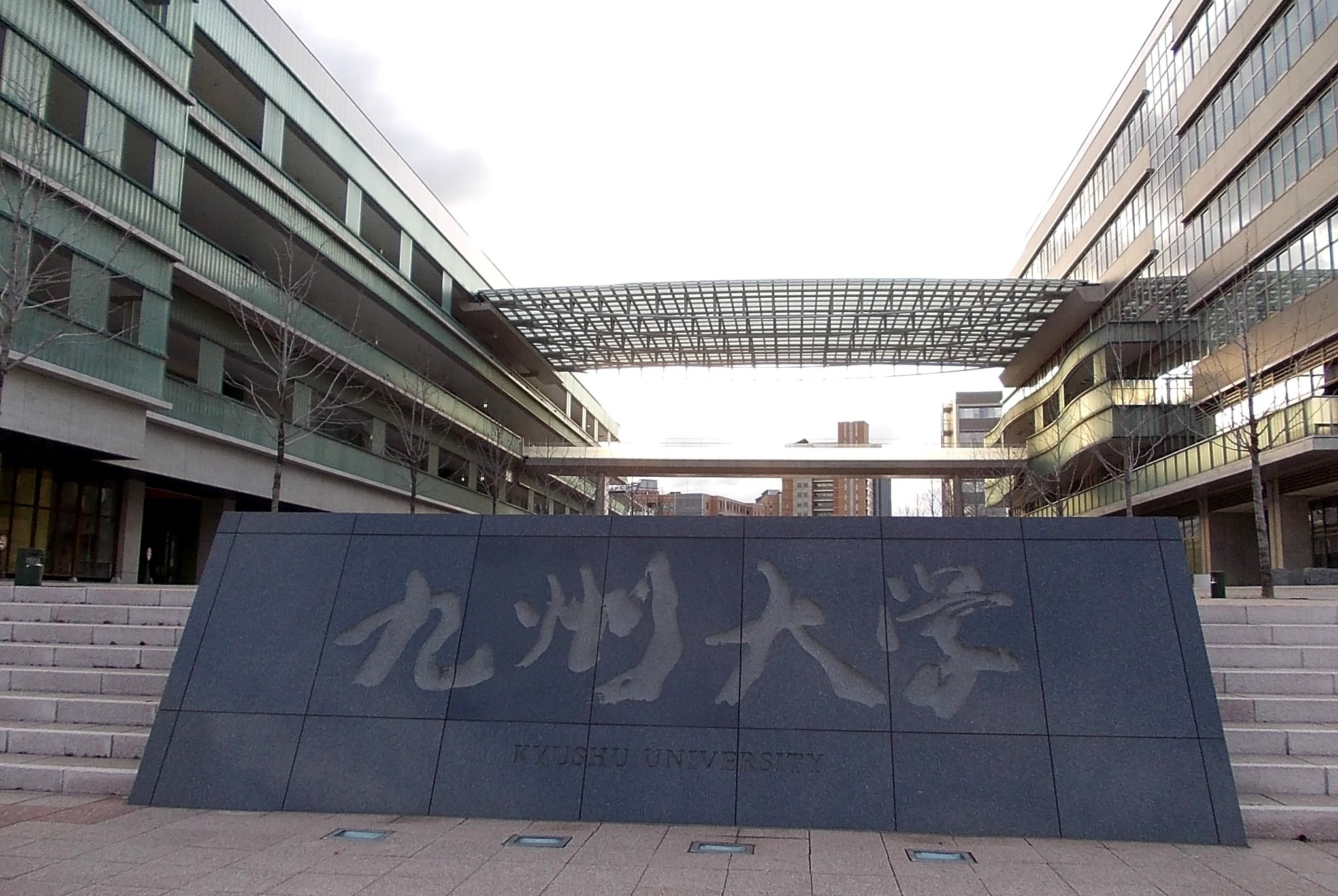
Learning & Community Space Q-Commons

The Ito campus is located in 744 Motooka Nishi-ku Fukuoka 〒819-0395.

=== West Zone ===
==== Facilities ====
The Seakeeping and Maneuvering Basin, High-Speed Circulating Water Channel is an experimental aquarium for the study of vessel motion used by a section of marine engineers. Its gross floor area is 2,126 square metres (22,880 sq ft) and area of architecture is 1,816 square metres (19,550 sq ft), constructed by Namihira Sangyo, electrical construction was done by Sanko Denki Kogyo, and setting of the machine was Sanken Setsubi Kogyo Co, Ltd. The International Research Center for Hydrogen Energy is an integrated research center for hydrogen energy in Japan and National Institute of Advanced Industrial Science and Technology. This architecture is single story steel structure and gross floor area of it is 1,014 square metres (10,910 sq ft) and area of architecture is 1,031 square metres (11,100 sq ft) and is designed by Takumi Architects Co, Ltd. and Sogo Setsubi Consulting Co, Ltd. and constructed by Nishinakasuhiguchi Construction Co, Ltd. and Miyafusa reiki.

Research Laboratory for High Voltage Electron Microscopy is an advanced electron microscope observation facility that aims to find out the state and architecture of atomic element and molecule. It is a three-story reinforced concrete building with a floor area of it is 377.35 m^{2} and area of architecture is 273.11 m^{2} and is designed by Na-no-tsu Kotobuki Kenchiku jimusho (那の津寿建築研究所, Na-no-tsu Kotobuki architect studio) and constructed by the branch firm of Shimizu Corporation, Akebono Denki Kōgyo, and Nomura Shōten. The Institute for Materials Chemistry and Engineering is divided into three parts in the districts of Chikushi, Hakozaki and Ito.

The Research Institute of Environmental Sustainability is a facility for experimental trials and studying of ambient systems. Its gross floor area is 1,344 square metres (14,470 sq ft) and the building area is 973 square metres (10,470 sq ft), construction was done by Heisei Kensetus, electrical work was done by kyushodensetsu., machine work was Kawamoto Industry Corporation. The architecture and libration engineering experimental building has a gross floor area of 640,000 square metres (6,900,000 sq ft) and a building area of 697 square metres (7,500 sq ft). It was constructed by Ito community service. Lecture Hall West is a lecture room for faculty of engineering. This building is three-story SRC structure, and partly is RC, and its gross floor area is 1,291.13 m^{2} and the building area is 662.09 m^{2}. The Institute of Mathematics for Industry is housed in a building that is an SRC and iron structure.

West Zone 2 rises eleven stories above the ground and has one underground story. The gross floor area is 54,365 square metres (585,180 sq ft), and the building area is 6,126 square metres (65,940 sq ft). It was designed by REQ Okamoto, and constructed by Nishimatsu Construction, Shinryo Corporation, Kyudenko Corporation, Dai-Dan Co, Ltd, Hishinetsu JV. This building is an educational research facility located section of geoenvironmental engineering and System Information graduate school. On the lower level floors there is a special laboratory, in the first and second floor is an information room, the third-story contains a lecture room and above the fourth floor are sections for geoenvironmental engineering and System Information. From first floor to eleven floor Foucault pendulum has the longest wire in Japan is installed in it. West Zone 3 construction was done by Kohnoike, Aoki and Kamimura J V, electric work was done by Nishitetsu densetsu kogyo, machine work was Nishihara Engineering Co, Ltd. elevator was Schindler Elevator K.K., about West Zone 3 & 4, construction was done by Shimizu, Okumura, Matsumoto JV, electric work was done by Kyudenko, Kuriharanto and Kyushu system JV, machine work was Sanki, Fuji, Kyushu Hitashi JV, elevator was Otis Elevator Company, about West Zone 4, constructed by Toda, Kumagaya and Mizoe JV, and electric work was done by Toenec Corporation and Asahi JV, machine work was Shin bishi, Urayasu, Chiytoda JV and elevator was Toshiba-elevator. West Zone 3 and 4 are both SRC and iron structures and rise nine-stories above the ground and one underground story. The gross floor area is 55,478 square metres (597,160 sq ft), and building area is 7,860 square metres (84,600 sq ft). It was designed by Mitsubishi Jisho Sekkei Inc. Cesar Pelli & Associates Japan, and Mishima Sekkei-jimusho.

The Energy Center is a core facility that supplies electrical energy to the whole campus. On the first floor are dynamo rooms and super transformer rooms. On the second floor are general monitoring rooms of general monitor center. It is a reinforced concrete structure rising two stories, with a gross floor area of 1,378 square metres (14,830 sq ft), and a building area of 1,016 square metres (10,940 sq ft), was designed by Azusa Sekkei, constructed by Iwasaki Kensetsu, electrical work was Hoshino Denko-sha, equipment was Showa Denko. The Low-Temperature Center is a facility that supplies cryogen such as liquid nitrogen and liquid helium. Its gross floor area is 407 square metres (4,380 sq ft) and the building area is 436 square metres (4,690 sq ft). It was constructed by PFI, Ito community service.

The Ito library is housed in a reinforced concrete structure and rises one story above the ground and includes one underground story which was designed by Kume. Its gross floor area is 6,976 square metres (75,090 sq ft), and building area is 3,535 square metres (38,050 sq ft). It was designed by Kume Sekisei Co.LTD; the design of electrical and machine work was done by Setsubigiken and the elevator was Kyushu University facility department and Toshiba-elevator.co, Ltd.. It was constructed by Zenidaka and Hokuyo tokutei kensetsu joint-venture group; the electric work was Shimada denki shokai; and the machine work was Takasago Thermal Engineering Co, Ltd. The INAMORI Frontier Research Center houses the International Institute for Carbon-Neutral Energy Research (12CNER). The Open Learning Plaza is a public lecture room and facility for graduates. It is reinforced concrete structure and rise three-stories above the ground and one underground story. Its gross floor area is 4,820 square metres (51,900 sq ft), and the building area is 2,145 square metres (23,090 sq ft). It was designed and constructed by Sato Kogyo, and electric and machine work was done by Sadenko. QIAO - Rock Art was designed by Ritsuko Taho (田甫律子) and is made of Itsuki stone describes dynamism of the terra of Kyushu with the power to stay alive and energy.

=== Center Zone ===
The Center Zone Master Plan was designed by Japanese architects Kisho Kurokawa and Ryota Matsumoto based on César Pelli's Ito Campus Master Plan in 2002. The Water Supply Center supplies clean water and resurgent water for experiments and sewage. There are 30 water treatment receiving tanks, and processing units on the 1st and 2nd floor. The gross floor area is 2,043 square metres (21,990 sq ft), and the building area is 1,822 square metres (19,610 sq ft). It was designed by the Kyushu University facilities department. Design for execution was overseen by Wesko and construction was by Tokukura Corporation, Wesco Corporation, Beppu Dengyo, and Sanwa shokai. Big Orange is a facility of transmission of information on the Kyushu University Ito campus. There is a meeting reception room, restaurant, and a book store. The Faculty of Social and Culture Studies, Faculty of Languages and Cultures building has a floor area of 8,165 square metres (87,890 sq ft) and a building area of 1,210 square metres (13,000 sq ft). It was constructed by Asuka Kensetsu, with electrical work done by Kyu-denko and machine work done by Kawamoto Kogyo.

== Chikushi campus ==
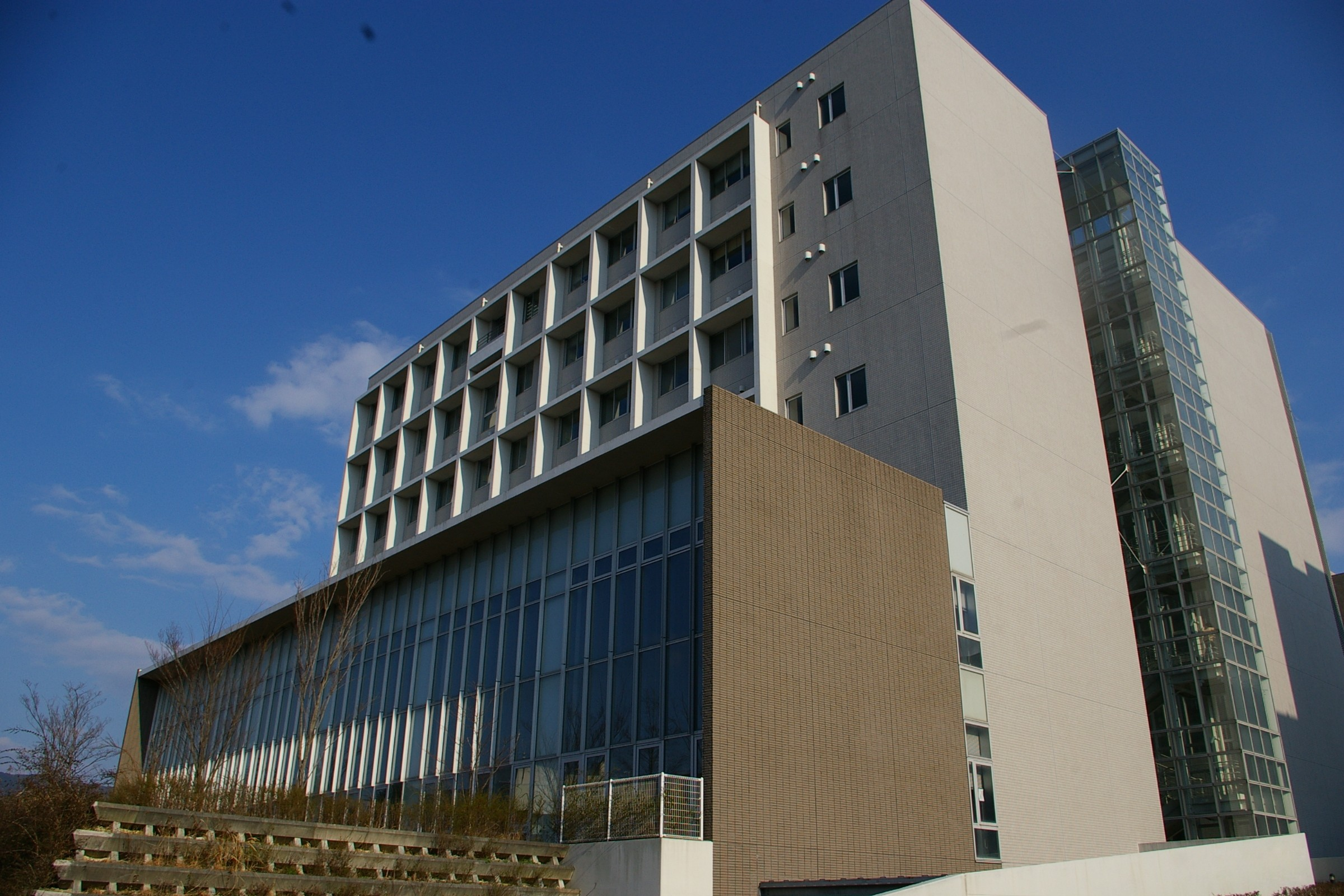
C-CUBE

The Chikushi campus is located at 6-1 Kasuga-koen, Kasuga, Fukuoka 816–8580. The campus has two gates, Onojo Gate faced in front of JR Onjo Sta. and it is within a one minute walk to the JR station.

The QUEST Experiment Building houses a fusion research reactor (Q-shu Univ. Exp. with Steady-State Spherical Tokamak) The Power Supply Ridge is the generator supplies electricity for QUEST. The Institute for Materials Chemistry and Engineering contains the Department of Fundamental Organic Chemistry, Department of Applied Molecular Chemistry, Department of Integrated Materials, Department of Advanced Device Materials. Buildings in this area include the Faculty of Engineering Science Buildings A, C and F, as well as the International Graduate School of Engineering Sciences. Building G houses the Department of Earth System Science and Technology and Building H houses the Department of Advanced Energy Engineering School of Engineering. The administrative offices for Engineering Sciences, the Research Institute for Applied Mechanics, the Institute for Materials Chemistry and Engineering, the Institute of Health Science and the Center of Advanced Instrumental Analysis, Art, Science, and Technology Center for Cooperative Research are located on this campus. There is also a wind lens nearby. The C-CUBE (Collaboration Building) is a building with seven stories. On the ground floor and the second floor is the library and the third floor to the seventh is research space.

KASTEC (Art, Science and Technology Center for Cooperative Research, Kyushu University) was established in 2003 with the amalgamation of Kyushu University and Kyushu Institute of Design. The Center of Advanced Instrumental Analysis was constructed in Apr. 1982, and is an on-campus collaborative education research facility. The Research Institute for Applied Mechanics (RIAM) contains the Division of Ocean-Atmosphere Dynamics, the Division of Plasma and Material Science, the Dynamics Simulation Research Center (DSRC), and the Advanced Fusion Research Center (AFRC). Institute for Ionized Gas and Laser Research was established in 1989. Itoh Research Center for Plasma Turbulence is located in the Itoh-Inagaki Laboratory.

== Ōhashi campus ==
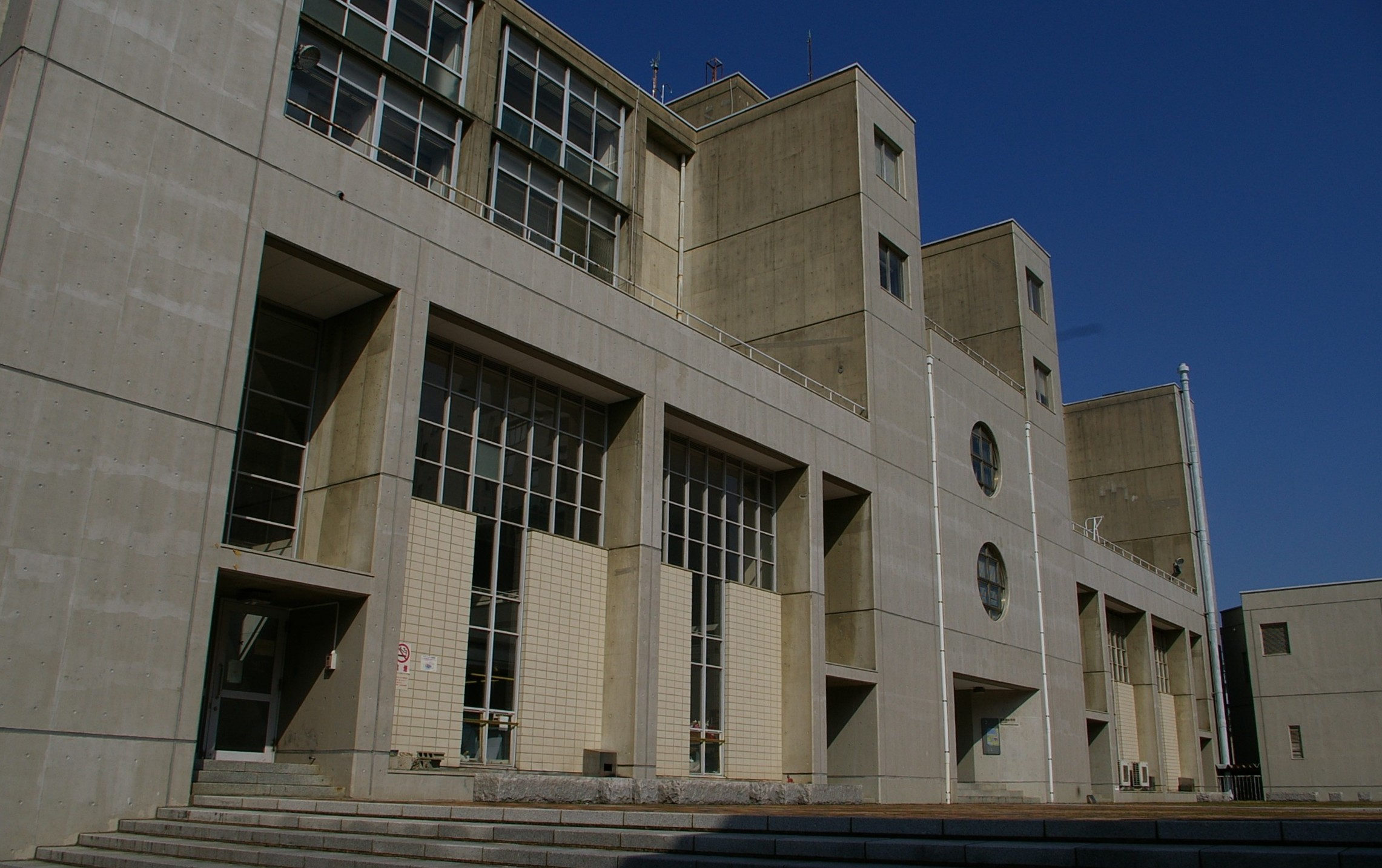
Bldg.2

The Ōhashi is located in 4-9-1 Shiobaru Minami-ku, Fukuoka 815–8540. On the cusp of retirement the universities corporate status a year before, Kyushu Institute of Design was absorbed into Kyushu University in 2003. Its old campus is now the Ōhashi campus.

The Visual Communication Design Center has a movie editing room for the Department of Visual Communication Design, as well as studios and darkrooms. The Environmental Research Center is a Laboratory of the Department of Environmental Design for architectural-related experiments. The Research Center for human environmental adaption is a controlled environment facilities for the Department of Industrial Design. It was established in 1971 by Kyushu Institute of Design and completely reconstructed in 2001. The Design Division of KASTEK has facilities and staff for university-industry collaboration. The university also has a Printing Workshop (Department of Visual Communication Design); woodworking, welding, and metalworking equipment; and an Open Design Laboratory, which contains equipment and facilities for motion capture, and 3D visual experiments. The Design Library has a video room and a stereo room.

Building 2 has laboratories for the Department of Environmental Design and the Department of Visual Communication Design, and drafting rooms and staff rooms. Similarly, Building 3 has laboratories, staff rooms, and a lecture hall for the Department of Industrial Design and Department of Acoustic Design. Building 4 has laboratories and classrooms for the Department of Environmental Design. Building 5 has staff rooms for the Department of Visual Communication Design, the Department of Art and Information Design, and the Department of Design Strategy. Buildings 6 and 7 belong to the Department of Applied Information and Communication Sciences, and the Department of Design Strategy and are composed of staff rooms and laboratories, respectively. Building 8 has physics, chemistry, and biology laboratories, along with staff and student rooms.

On the first floor of the Admission Office is the Registrar and Student Affairs, and on the second floor there are General Affairs and Accounting Departments. In the Institute of Health Science building, there is a Convenience store and cafeteria on the first floor, and the Health Service Center on the second floor. *Gymnasium facilities include a basketball court, martial arts practice area, shower rooms, and a weight training room. There is also a multipurpose sports field.

== Beppu ==
The Beppu campus is located in 4546 Tsurumihara Tsurumi, Beppu, Oita 874–0838.

== Satellite office ==
Kyushu University has three satellite offices. Tokyo Office relocated to the Yurakucho Building from the Marunouchi Naka-dori Building on April 19, 2008. QBS, housed in the Kyushu University Hakata station office building (九州大学博多駅オフィス), was established on the eleventh floor of JR Hakata city (JR博多シティ) in 2011. The Ōhashi Satellite campus is located in front of Ōhashi Station on the Tenjin Ōmuta Line.

== See also ==
- Campus of the University of Tokyo
- Campus of Keio University
