= Kokichi Yamaguchi =

Japanese architect (1873–1937)

- Born: November 16, 1873; Kagoshima prefecture, Japan
- Died: 1937 (aged 63–64)
- Education: The University of Tokyo
- Occupation: Architect

Kokichi Yamaguchi (山口孝吉, Yamaguchi Kōkichi; 16 November 1873 – 1937) was a Japanese architect active at The University of Tokyo.

== Biography ==
Yamaguchi was born in Kagoshima prefecture in 1873 and graduated from The University of Tokyo in 1897. He first worked as an architect for the Ministry of Education. From 1907 to his retirement in 1923, he worked for the Building and Repairs section at The University of Tokyo. In 1912 he was promoted to the head of the section.

== Architecture ==
Yamaguchi worked on several buildings at Hongo Campus during his time at the University of Tokyo Buildings and Repairs section, but most were destroyed only a few months after his retirement in the 1923 Great Kantō earthquake. Yamaguchi's successor as head of the Building and Repairs section, Yoshikazu Uchida, oversaw the rebuilding of the campus and designed most of the present buildings. Uchida's work dominates the present campus and Yamaguchi is therefore not well remembered. This is perhaps evident from the fact that the auditorium Yamaguchi designed is presented with "designer unknown" in the book commemorating the 100-year history of Hongo campus, published in 1988. The only remaining building of Yamaguchi on Hongo Campus is the East Chemistry Building, which is a two-story red brick building located east of Yasuda Auditorium. This building was the first construction on campus to use reinforced concrete. Yamaguchi also constructed a similar north section for the chemistry department, which was completed in 1923, a few months before the earthquake. This building did also survive the earthquake but was demolished in 1984.

A few examples of Yamaguchi's work can be seen in the model collection of the University Museum of The University of Tokyo. Four of Yamagchi's buildings from the university were created in scale 1:100 by the Italian model maker Giovanni Sacchi in 1997.

== Buildings and structures ==
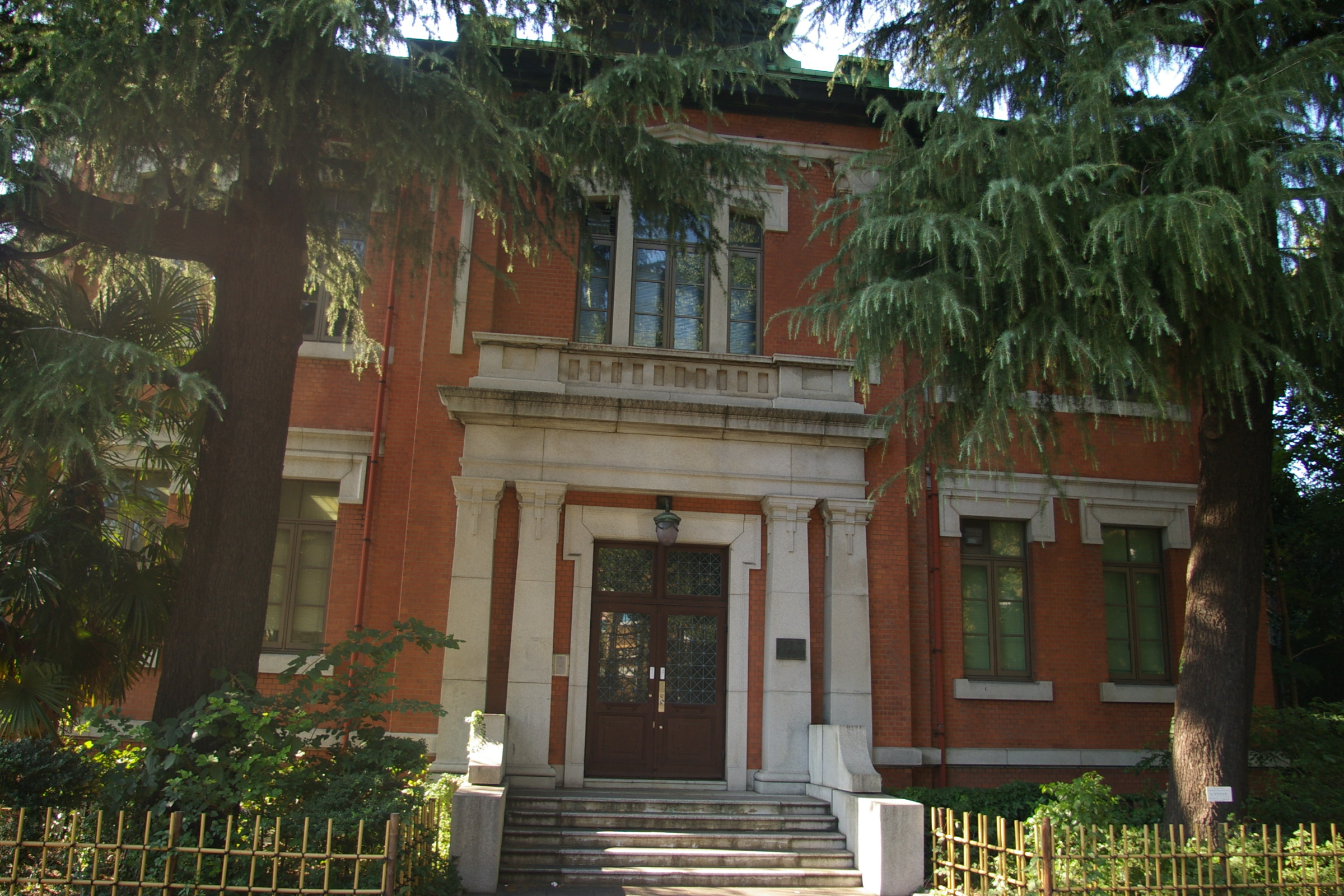
East Chemistry Building, The University of Tokyo

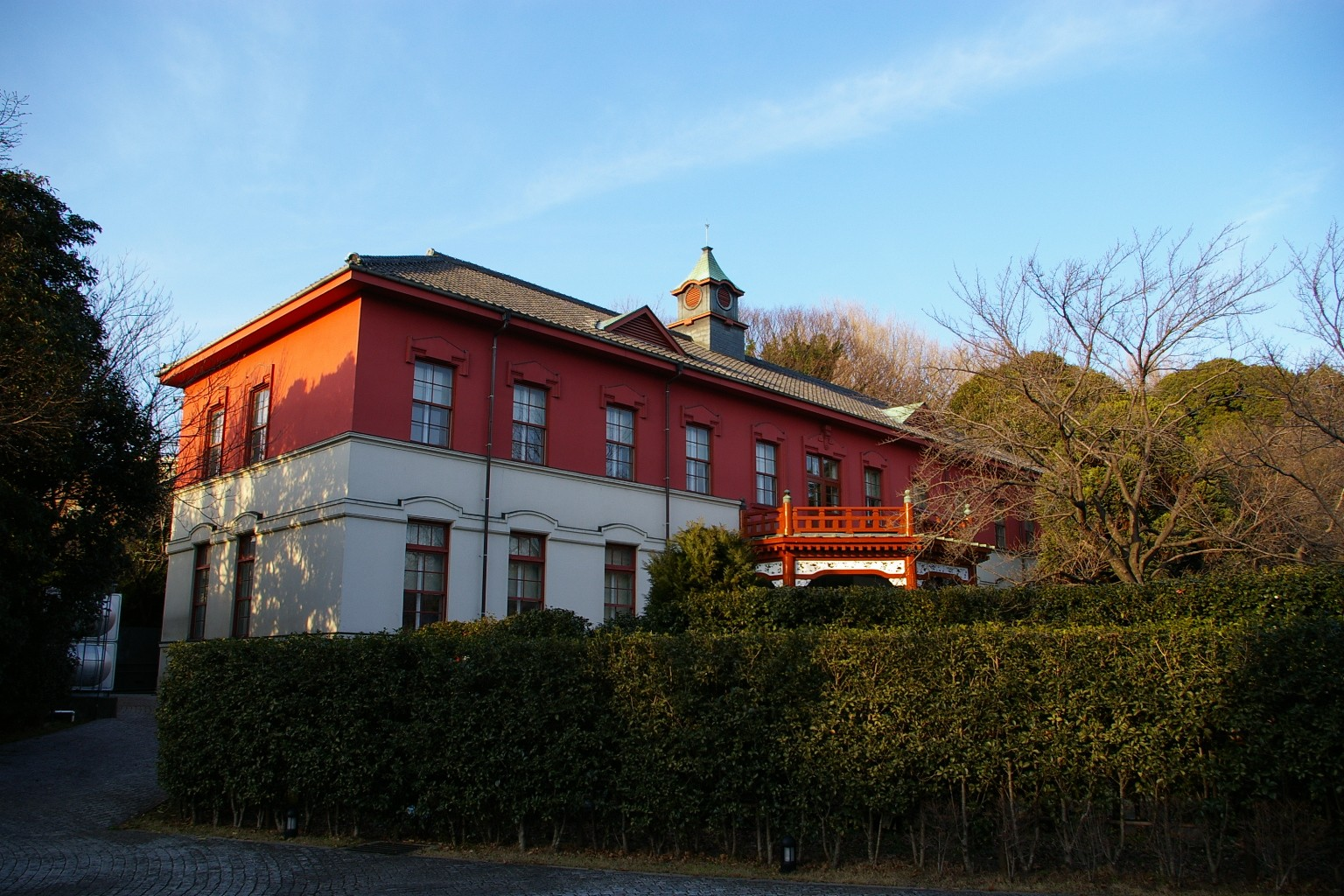
Former Main Building of the Tokyo Medical School (now Koishikawa Annex)

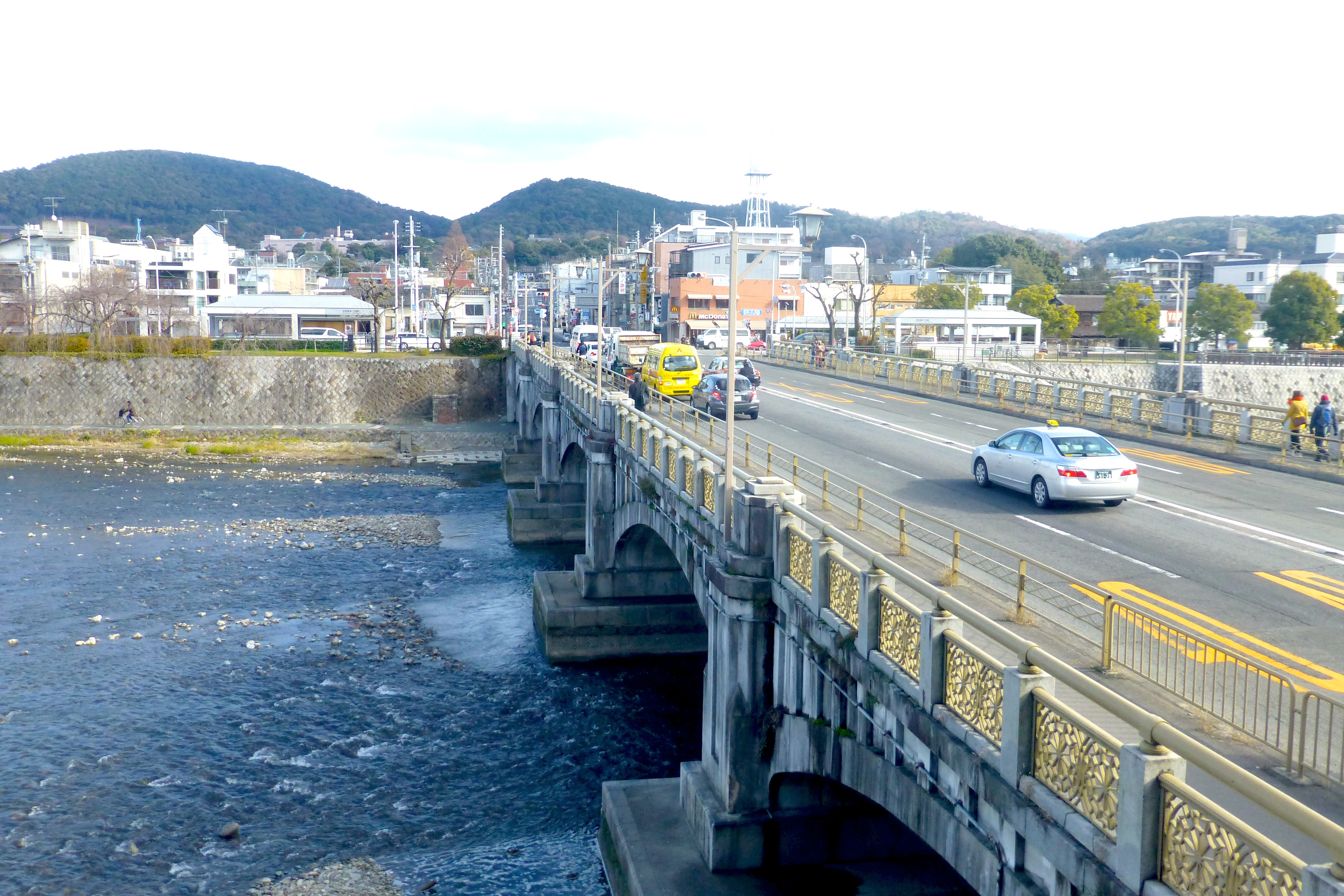
Shichijo Bridge, Kyoto

List of building and structures that Yamaguchi worked on sorted after year of completion:

- 1899: Former Ishikawa Second Junior High School Main Building (currently a museum)
- 1902: Nanki Bunko (南葵文庫) new building/office in Azabu, Tokyo (demolished)
- 1906: Building of the Department of Legal Medicine, of the Medical College, Tokyo Imperial University (destroyed in earthquake)
- 1907: Building of the Department of Naval Architecture, Weaponry, and Civil Engineering (destroyed in earthquake)
- 1908: Nanki Bunko (南葵文庫) second library (第二書庫) (demolished)
- 1911: Former Main building of the Tokyo Medical School (relocation and remodeling design by Yamaguchi. Disassembled in 1965 and moved to Koishikawa Botanical Garden in 1969)
- 1913: Shichijo Bridge, Kyoto (with Keisaku Shibata and Matsunosuke Moriyama)
- 1914: Lecture Hall of the college of Law, the Tokyo Imperial University (destroyed in earthquake)
- 1916: East chemistry building
- 1918: Mitsui Bunko (三井文庫) main building and first library wing (demolished)
- 1922: Mitsui Bunko, second library wing (旧三井文庫第二書庫) (located in the park Bunko no Mori)
- 1923: North chemistry building (demolished)

== See also ==
- Yoshikazu Uchida
- Campus of the University of Tokyo
