= Campus of the University of Tokyo =

Japanese historical campus

The campus of the University of Tokyo is the location of the first modern Japanese university. The campus is of historical note for two reasons. First, it was not damaged by air raids during World War II. Second, many university buildings have been declared National Treasures of Japan as they are examples of historic architectural design. This article focuses on registered cultural heritage.

== Hongo campus ==
The Hongo campus has many historic buildings including Yasuda Auditorium, the first registered tangible cultural heritage property in Tokyo. Other examples of registered cultural heritage sites are the Main Gate, including the porter's lodge; buildings 1, 2 and 3 of the Faculty of Law & Letters; the building housing the Faculty of Engineering (Reppin-kan); and building 1 of the Faculty of Engineering.

Many campus buildings were designed by Yoshikazu Uchida in the Gothic style known as Uchida Gothic. One of the most notable examples of this style is the Faculty of Medicine Building 3, the administration building for Medicine; however, there are many other Uchida Gothics on campus.

=== Gates ===
- Sei mon (正門, Main Gate) was designed by Chuta Ito and was completed in 1912. It is located in the western part of the campus facing Hongo dori (Hongo Street).
- Akamon (赤門, Red Gate) is located in the southwest of the campus, and it also faces Hongo dori. It is often mistaken for the Main Gate, and so the University of Tokyo is commonly called the Akamon.
- Goshuden mon (御守殿門, Goshuden Gate) is located in Kami yashiki (上屋敷, , close to Edo Castle), which was owned by the daimyō of the Maeda clan. The gate was constructed at the time of the marriage ceremony of Yasu-hime (溶姫), a daughter of the eleventh Tokugawa shōgun, Tokugawa Ienari (徳川家斉), to Maeda Nariyasu (前田斉泰), the twelfth lord of the Maeda clan, in 1827. The gate's architectural style is Yakui mon, with hafu (破風, gable)-roofed guard stations. It is an important cultural property and was designated as a national heritage.
- Ikeno-hata mon (池之端門, Ikeno-hata Gate) is located in the eastern part of the campus and faces Shinobazu Street. This gate is near the Yokoyama Taikan memorial house and the Kyu-Iwasaki-tei Garden. It allows access to both the Ueno Station and the Yushima station. It is mainly used by hospital employees and medical students.
- Tatsuoka mon (龍岡門, Tatsuoka Gate) is located on the southern part of the campus. It was designed by Yoshikazu Uchida and completed in 1933. The name came from Tatsuoka-cho, the old name of Yushima. Tetsu mon (鉄門, Iron Gate) is very close to the Tatsuoka Gate, so many people confuse Tatsuoka mon with Tetsu mon.
- Tetsu mon (鉄門, Iron Gate) was located near the southern end of the Central Clinical Service Building, from 1879 to 1918. In 1918, the university purchased some acres of private land outside of Tetsu mon, and there was no need to mark off the site of the university with the gate. The Tetsu mon that exists today was reconstructed on May 5, 2006, at the same location. Before the current gate was in place, the Tetsu mon was specified as the main gate of Hongo Campus. The former admissions building of the medical school is located near the gate, and the name of Tetsu mon became synonymous with the University of Tokyo Medical School, and the alumni of it. Today the Tetsu mon kinen kan (鉄門記念館, Tetsu mon Gate Memorial Hall) is used for commemorative purposes .
- Kasuga mon (春日門, Kasuga Gate) is located on the south side of the campus, and faces Kasuga dori. The gate was renovated in 2007.
- Nishikata mon (西片門, Nishikata Gate) was completed in 2007. It is located in the northwestern part of campus and faces Hongo dori as do the Aka mon and the Sei mon. The Niskikata Gate is an especially small gate. It is located behind the Faculty of Engineering Building 5, and it is only used by pedestrians going to the engineering department. Previously those pedestrians had to go through the main gate to the Yayoi campus, which led to a more circuitous route. The name of the gate derives from its geographical location.
- Kaitoku mon (懐徳門, Kaitoku Gate) was finished in 2007 and was built near the entrance of the Toei Ōedo subway line. The gate is close to The University Museum of the University of Tokyo and the Faculty of Science Building 2. The gate's walls were made with the blocks of the original Kaitoku-kan destroyed during World War 2.
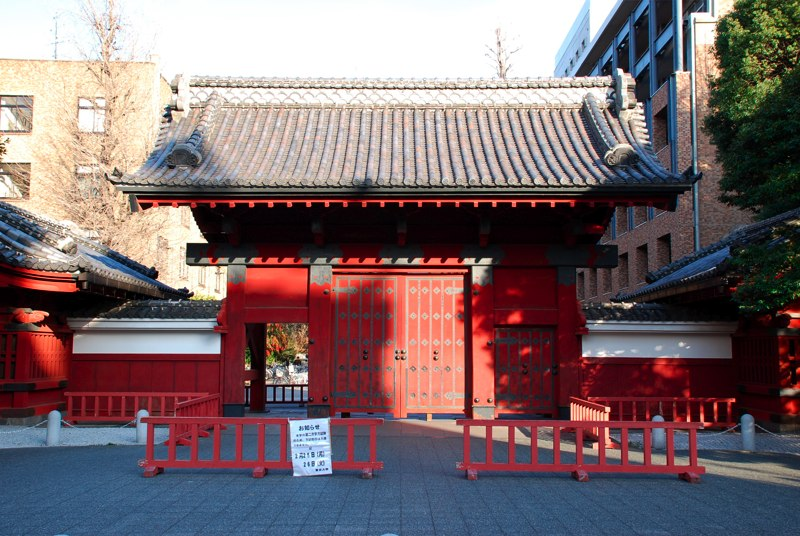
Aka-mon (赤門, Red gate)

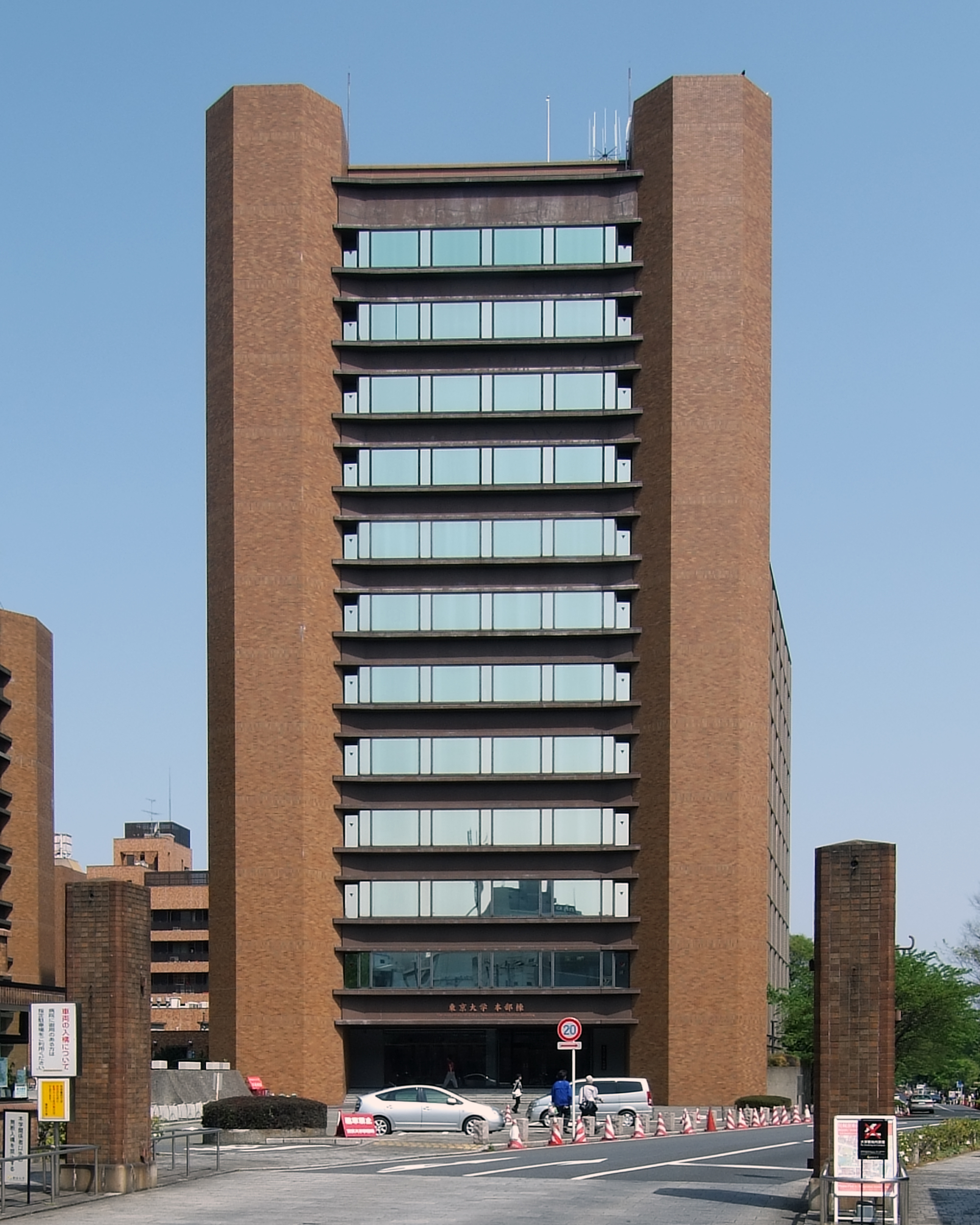
The Tatsuoka-mon (龍岡門, Tatsuoka Gate) with the administration building beyond

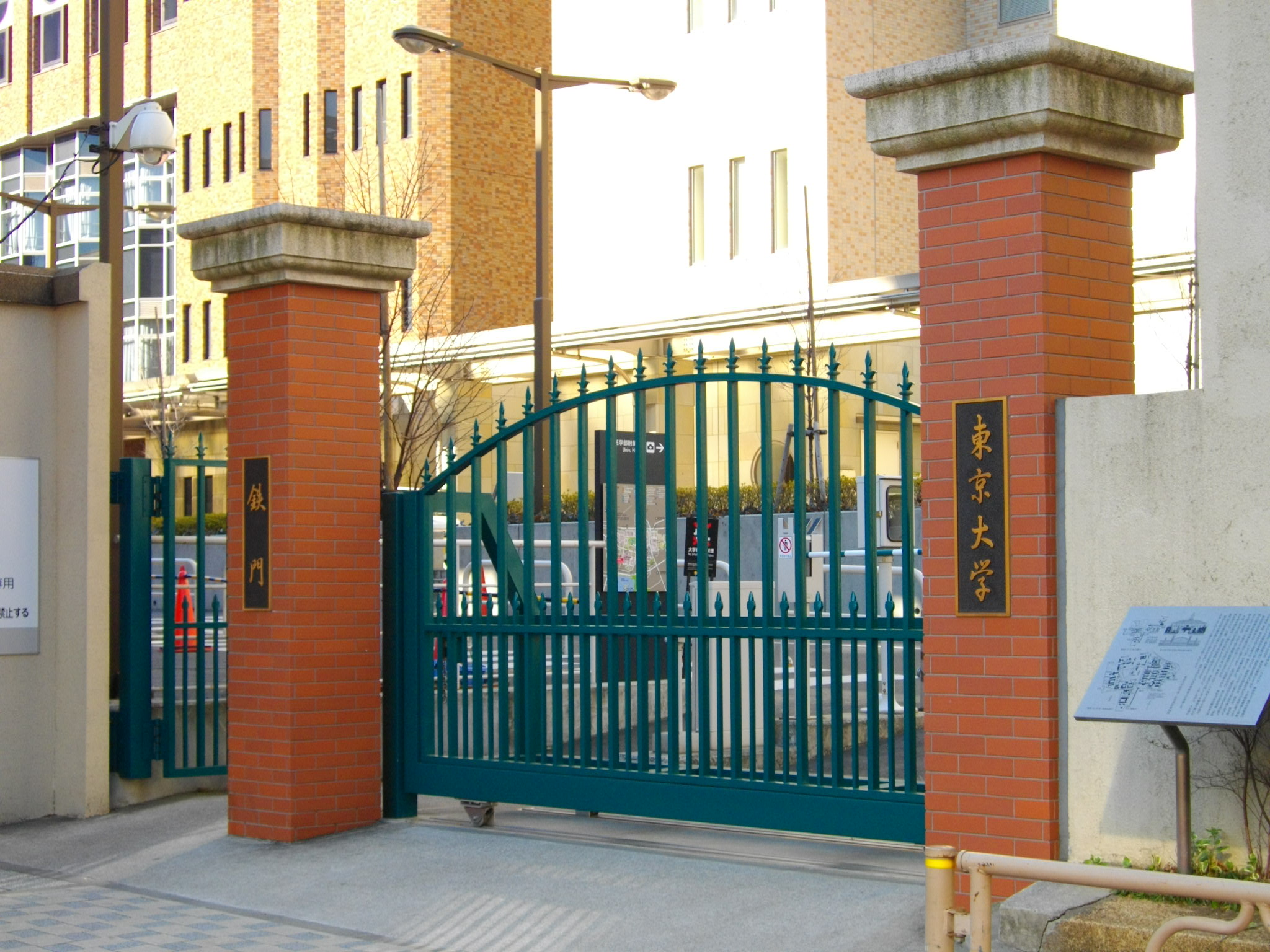
Tetsu-mon (鉄門, Iron gate)

=== Head office and University Research Institute Facilities ===
- Administration Bureau Building 1 was designed by Kenzō Tange, and was built in 1979. It is located near the Tatsuoka mon; and, as its name suggests, it is used as the head office of the university. The building has 12 floors, which was uncommonly tall for 1979.
- Administration Bureau Building 2 was finished in 1976 as Faculty of Science Building 7. It was also designed by Kenzō Tange. The building is situated next to the Administration Bureau, and its design is similar to that of the latter. At first, the building was used for the mathematics, science, and geological science departments. After the mathematics department moved to the Mathematical Science Building in the Komaba campus and the geological science department's relocated to Building 1, it became Administration Bureau Building 2. Today, it houses the Administration Bureau, the Graduate School of Public Policy, the study-abroad office, and a part of the Graduate School of Interdisciplinary Information Studies, etc.
- Yasuda Auditorium (formal nomenclature Tokyo Daigaku dai kodo (東京大学大講堂, The Great Hall of The University of Tokyo)) is a registered tangible cultural heritage building. A groundbreaking ceremony for the auditorium was held in 1925, and construction was completed the same year. The designers were Yoshikazu Uchida and Hideto Kishida.
- General Library. When the 1923 Great Kantō earthquake struck, the old brick library burned down, and a new library was constructed with donations from the Rockefeller Foundation. The rebuilt library was designed by Yoshikazu Uchida, and finished in 1928.
- After World War II, in order to house several newly created departments and research institutes, the south side of the campus was expanded with new buildings for the Faculty of Education, the old Information Technology Center, the Institute of Social Science, and the Historiographer Institute. The expansion was built in the Uchida Gothic style.
- Central Commons was completed in 1976 and is located below the square of Yasuda Auditorium. It has the characteristics of a dome.
- Sanjo Conference Hall was completed as part of the centenary anniversary celebrations of the university in 1986. The Hall was designed by Kunio Maekawa, and contains assembly rooms and a staff cafeteria. Near the Tatsuoka Gate is the Sanjo Conference Hall Tatsuoka-mon Annex.
- Information Center building was designed by Hideto Kishida and completed in 1926. Originally built as the night clinic attached to the academic medical center, and to house the medical association office, it was later converted into the Information Center. It is located near the Tatsuoka mon. In 2003, it was designated as a historical architecture selected by the Tokyo Metropolitan Government.
- Communication Center was originally built, in 1910, as a garage for jinrikisha, but it was refurbished after the establishment of the Act of National University Corporations. It is the oldest building on the Hongo campus, although the oldest school building is the Chemistry Building. Within the University of Tokyo campus it stands as the oldest piece of architecture next to the University Museum Koishikawa Annex.
- Kaitoku kan (懐徳館, Kaitoku House) originally was the residence of the Maeda family. In 1905, the Japanese wooden house was designed by Torazo Kitazawa and was completed under the patronage of the Emperor. In 1907, a western-architecture-style house, designed by Watanabe Yuzuru was completed. In 1926, in a land-space exchange with the Tokyo Prefecture (東京府), the residence was donated and became the site of the agricultural department in Komaba. Both of the houses were burned down during the Great Tokyo Air Raids, but the Japanese wooden house was rebuilt in 1951. Some of the buildings in the Hongo campus have used the blocks from the burned western-style house.
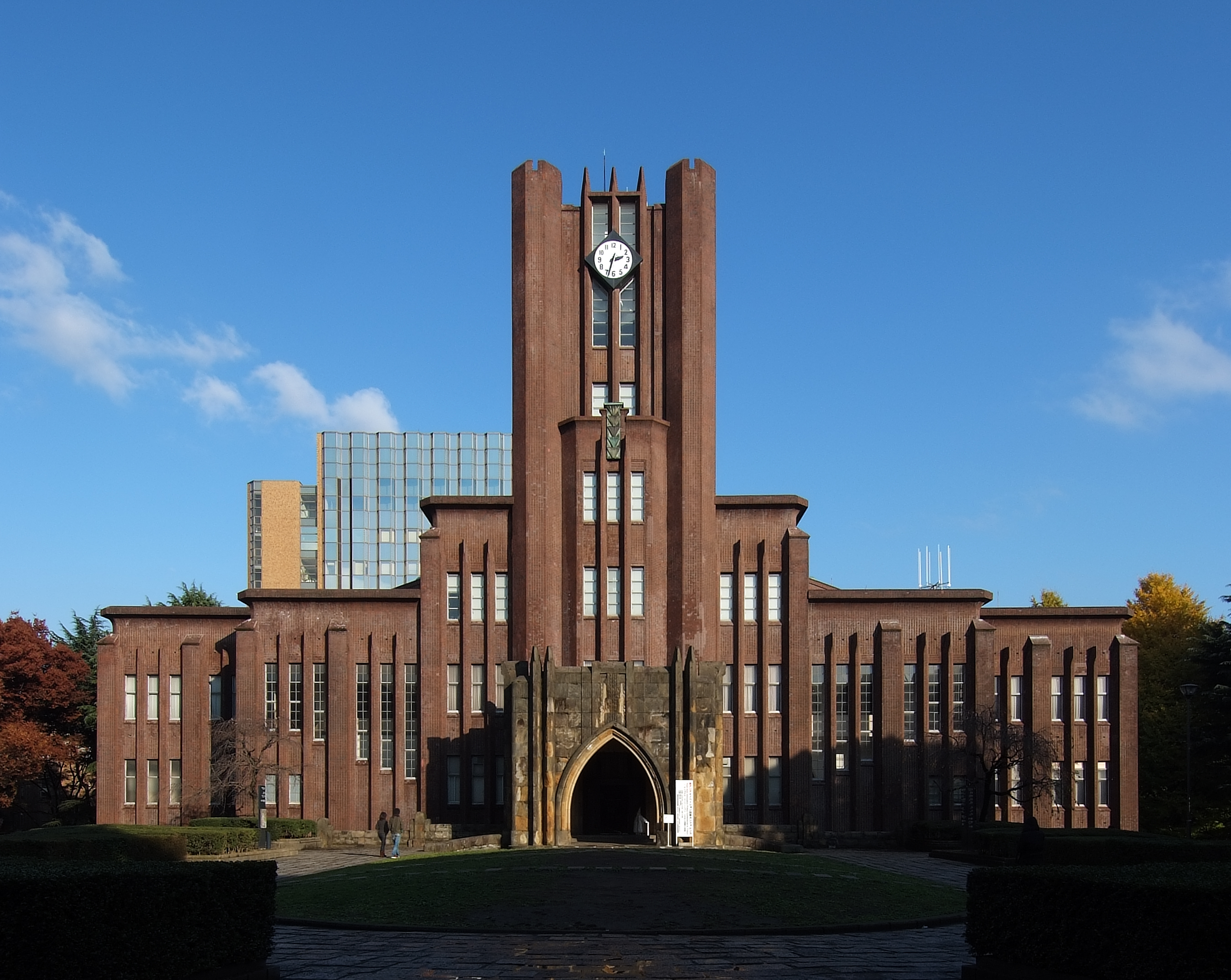
Yasuda Kodo (安田講堂, Yasuda Auditorium) (behind it is Faculty of Science Building 1)

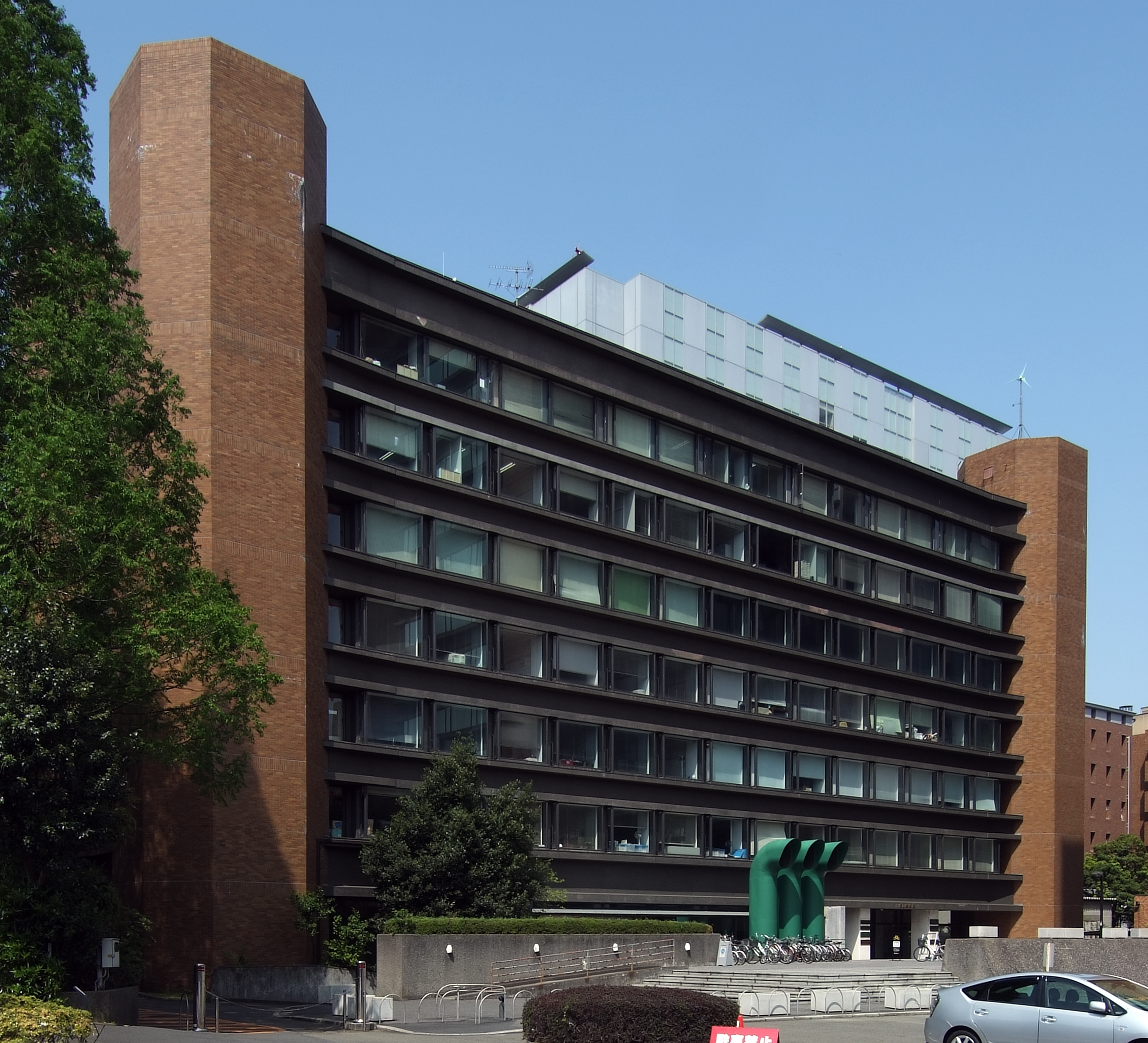
Administration Bureau Building 2

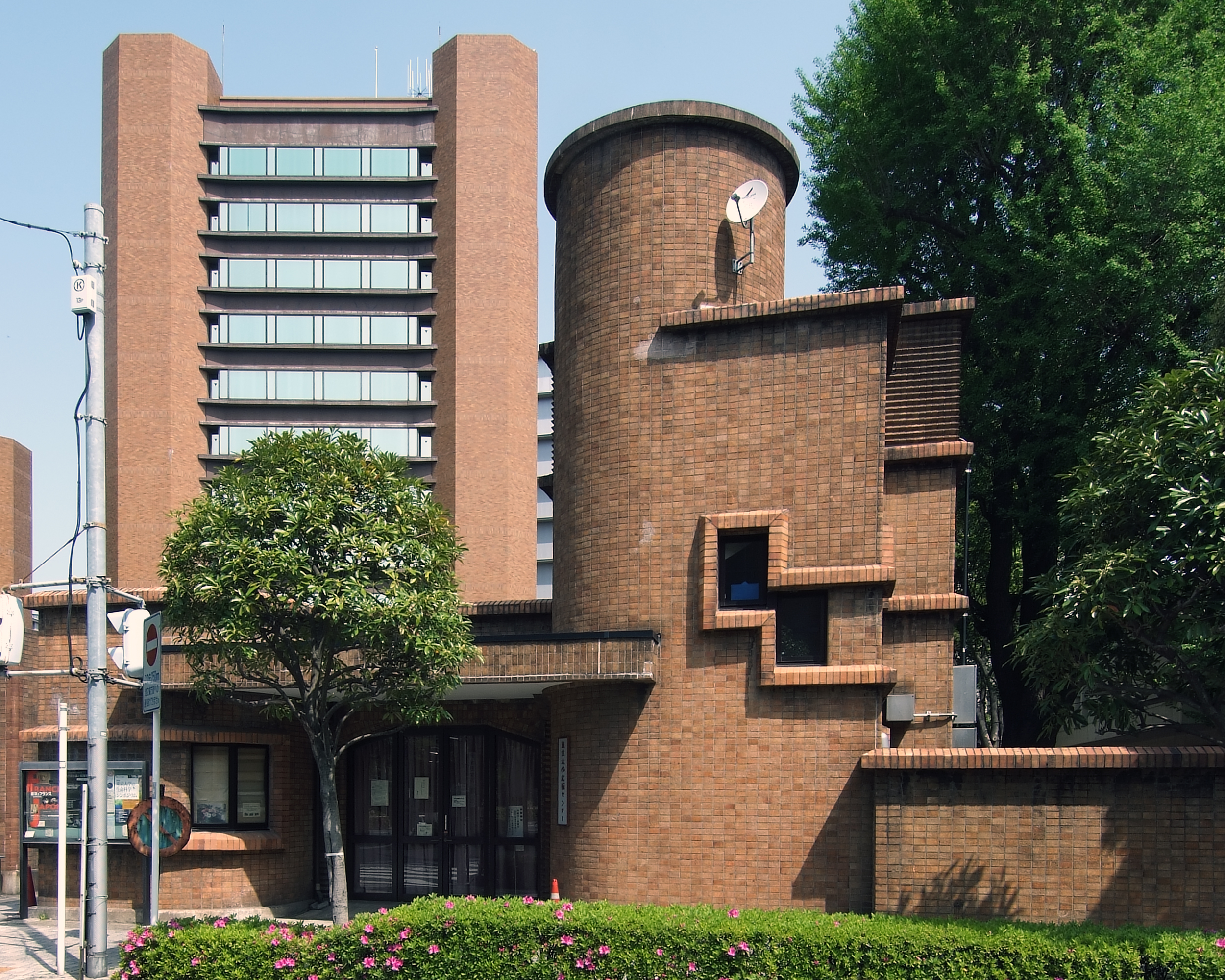
Information Center

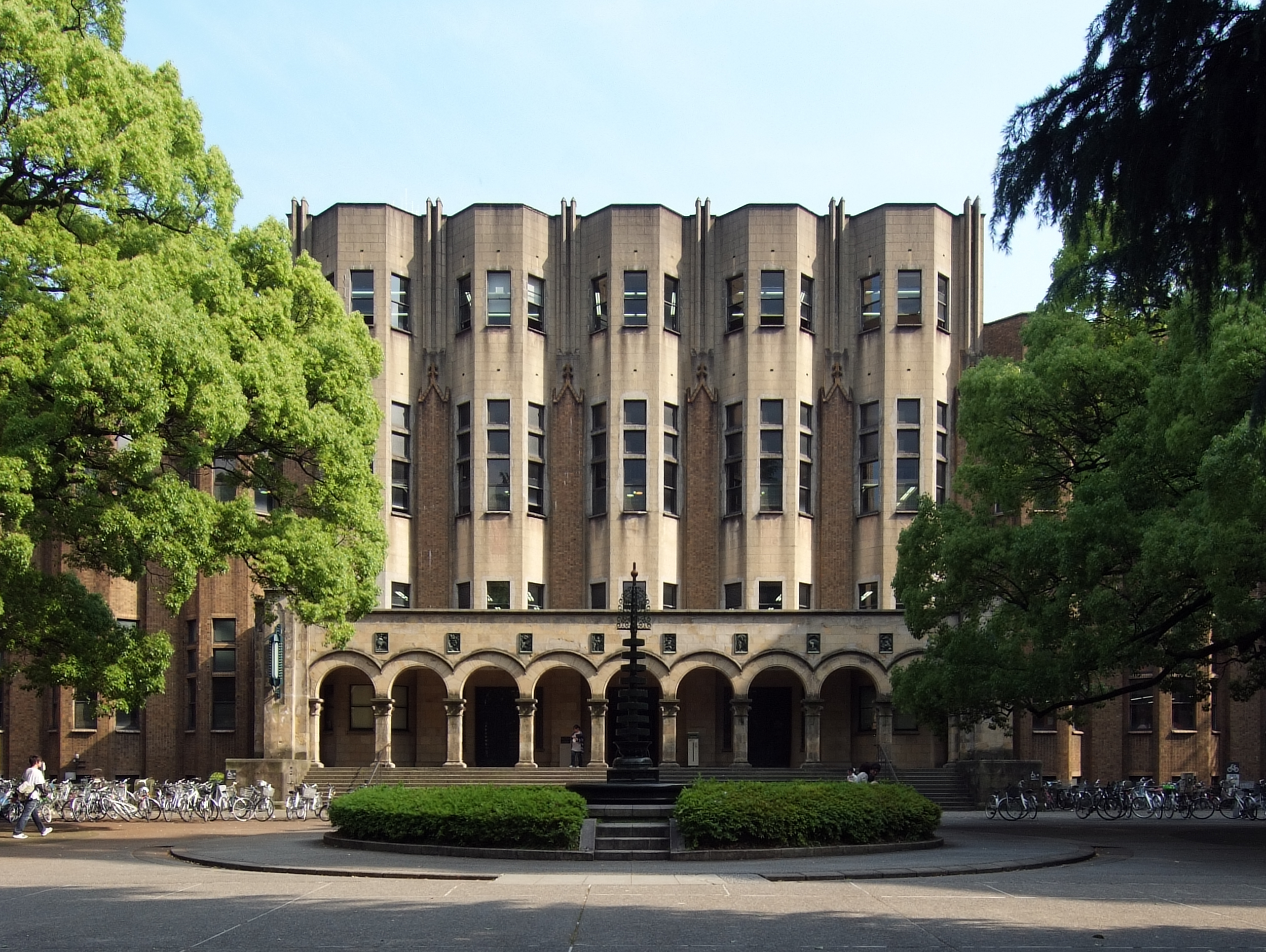
General Library

=== Sports facilities ===
- Gotenshita kinenkan (御殿下記念館, Gotenshita Memorial Arena) is a gym facility located to the east of the Sanshiro Pond (Ikutokuen). The gym was designed by Yoshinobu Ashihara. It was completed in 1988 as a consequence of the 1977 centennial celebrations. The provisional title was Hongo Kinen-kan, because, at first, it was to be built on a part of the Yayoi campus. After plans were changed, the facility was constructed at the present site. The gym has a swimming pool, gymnasium, training room, rock-climbing wall, and other facilities.

The University decided to renovate the structure next to the athletic field, designed by Yoshikazu Uchida and constructed in 1933. It served as poling board and the entrance to the chemistry building and the mall. Later, it was decided to demolish the building because of signs of distress, and the Student Counseling Center was built on its site.

- Nanatoku-do (七徳堂, Seven Virtues Dojo) is a martial arts gymnasium located on the south side of the Goten shita field, near the medical library. It was designed by Yoshikazu Uchida in a Japanese style of architecture, not his usual gothic. Completed in 1938, it has been designated as historical architecture by the Tokyo Metropolitan Government. The origin of the name was derived from wǔ yǒu qī dé (武有七徳, the seven rules of war), xuān gōng shí èr nián 「宣公十二年」(xuān gong twenty years) in chūn qiū zuǒ shì 『春秋左氏伝』 (the commentary for Shun-ju written by zuŏ qiū míng). The term was coined by Dr. Atsushi Shionoya, Professor of Tokyo Imperial University.

=== Faculty of Law ===
- Faculty of Law & Letters Building 1 was designed by Yoshikazu Uchida and was completed in 1935. The building was known as Ho bun kei ichigo-kan (法文経1号館, the Law-Letters-Econ 1st bldg.), when its classrooms were also used by the economics department. It is a registered tangible cultural heritage. Classroom 25, located upstairs, is a large lecture room where meetings are held, and it is also used for giving entrance examinations. The schoolroom was the site of the Todai Popolo Incident of 1952. The office of the Faculty of Law is in Faculty of Law & Letters Building 1.
- Faculty of Law & Letters Building 2 was designed by Yoshikazu Uchida and was completed in 1938, and mirrors building 1 across the street that runs from the Main Gate to Yasuda Auditorium. Form, when it was also used for classrooms for the department of economics, it was called Ho-bun-kyo nigoh-kan (法文経2号館, the Law-Letters-Econ 2nd bldg.). The office of the Faculty of Literature is now located here. It is also a registered tangible cultural heritage. The arcade, at right angle to the street, and decorated with ancient Greece-style carving, show Uchida Gothic at its truest. In the basement are Ginnan Metoro Shokudo (銀杏・メトロ食堂, Ginnan Metro Refectory) (old Daiich Shokudo) and Todai Seikyo daiichi kobai-bu (東大生協第一購買部, The University of Tokyo co-op 1st school store).
- Faculty of Law & Letters Building 3 was designed by Yoshikazu Uchida and was completed in 1927. It is a registered tangible cultural heritage.
- Faculty of Law & Letters Building 4 was designed by Sachio Otani and was completed in 1987. It is the building located on the west side of the square in front of the General Library. It was constructed at the same time as Faculty of Letters Building 3.
- General Research Building was designed by Humihiko Maki, and Maki and Associates, and was completed in 2003. It is characterized by its full-height windows. It is mainly used by the School of Law.

=== Faculty of Medicine ===
- Faculty of Medicine Building 1 was designed by Yoshikazu Uchida, and was completed in 1931. Now it is used integrally with Bio-science Research Bldg. Remodeling was completed in 2002.
- Faculty of Medicine Building 2 (main building) was designed by Yoshikazu Uchida and was completed in 1936. The office for the medical school is located here. The medical library was completed as a part of the medical school's 100th anniversary celebrations in 1961. It was reinforced against earthquakes in 2008. It is called the Central Center.
- First Research Building and the East Clinical Research Building. Both buildings were designed by Yoshikazu Uchida and were completed in 1928.
- Clinical Research Center and the Administration & Research Buildings. Both buildings were designed by Yoshikazu Uchida and were completed in 1929.
- South Clinical Research Building was designed by Yoshikazu Uchida and Hideto Kishida, and was completed in 1925. It is said that the building has the characteristics of expressionist architecture.
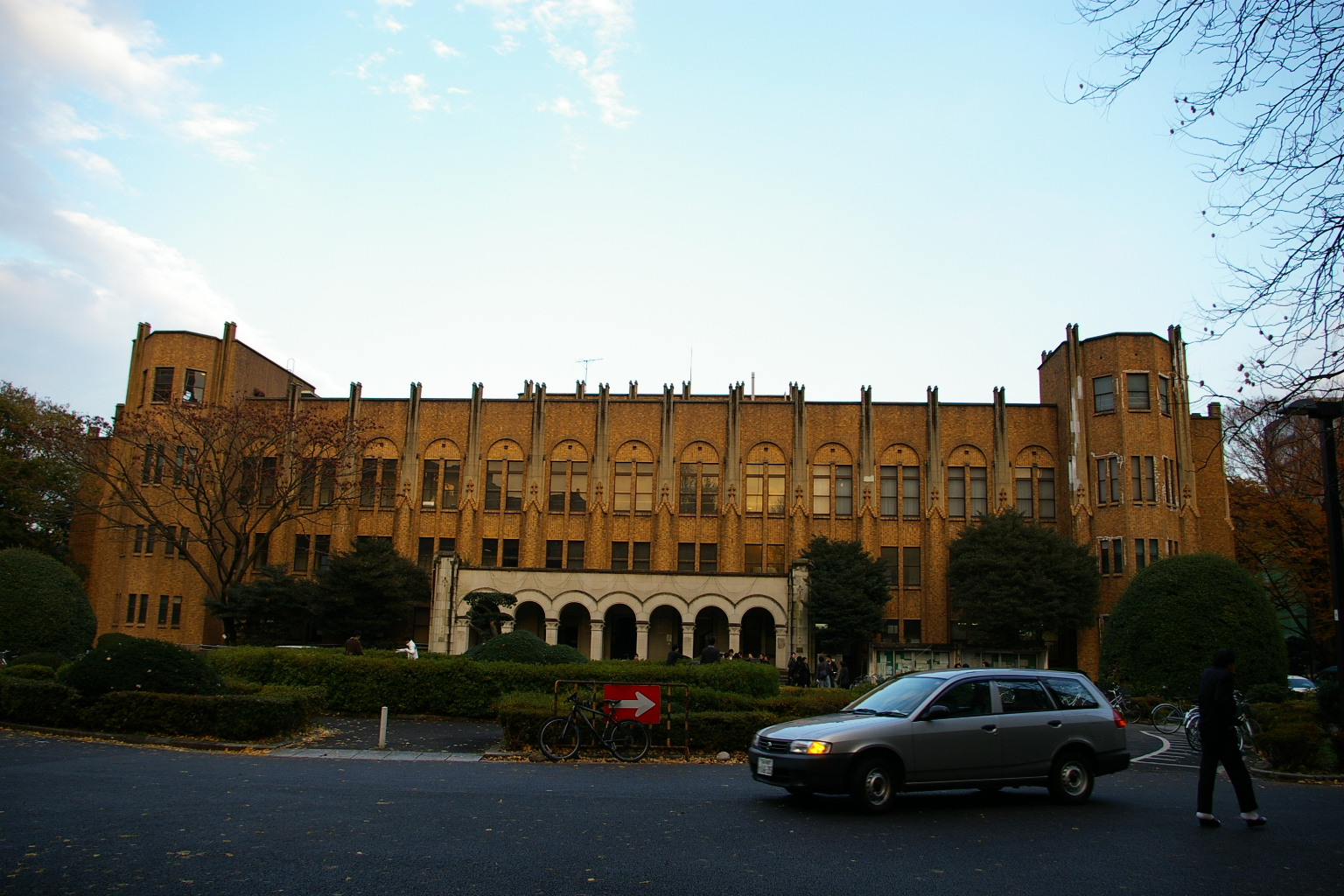
Faculty of Medicine Bldg.2. (main building)

=== Faculty of Engineering ===
- Reppin-kan (列品館, Design Museum) was designed by Yoshikazu Uchida and Hideto Kishida, and it was completed in 1925. It is a registered tangible cultural heritage. At first, it was planned as a museum to exhibit design specimens, but it later housed the office of the Faculty of Engineering.
- Faculty of Engineering Building 1 was designed by Yoshikazu Uchida. Constructed on the vacant lot of the engineering faculty administration building that collapsed in the Great Kanto Earthquake, it was completed in 1935. It is a registered tangible cultural heritage. As the building became aged it became unstable; and it was renovated completely, based on the design of Hisao Koyama, in 1998. The original building had the form of the Chinese: 日; lit. 'day'. Its courtyard is now glass-roofed, and used as a drawing room and library for the architecture department. In the forecourt there is a statue of architect Josiah Conder. It is used by the Department of Civil Engineering for architecture courses.
- Faculty of Engineering Building 2. A part of the old wing of this building was the first architectural structure that Yoshikazu Uchida designed. It was designed before the Great Kanto Earthquake, and differed slightly from Uchida Gothic: for example, in the color of the tile. The front of the building was incomplete at the time of the earthquake but it was not damaged. The restoration was left entirely to Uchida. The original plan had been to demolish the old building; but for the sake of historical preservation, the plan was changed to preserve much of it. The north side of the old building was replaced by a new, taller north wing; the south side of the building, facing Yasuda Auditorium, was preserved, but with added floors above, sustained by pillars similar in shape to those lining the old building's courtyard. The building is used by the mechanical engineering and the electronics and information systems departments. The south wing overhangs the inner court, which has become a community space, and a Subway restaurant has opened there.
- Faculty of Engineering Building 3 was designed by Yoshikazu Uchida and completed in 1939. It is used by the department of electronics and information systems and by the Institute of Engineering Innovation. It is scheduled to be rebuilt and integrated with the adjacent Faculty of Engineering Building 2, with building 2's community space being extended to building 3.
- Faculty of Engineering Building 4 was designed by Yoshikazu Uchida and was completed in 1927. It is used mainly by the Faculty of Material Engineering and the Faculty of System Innovation.
- Faculty of Engineering Building 5 was completed in 1961. It is used by the faculty of applied chemistry and the faculty of the Department of Chemical System Engineering.
- Faculty of Engineering Building 6 was designed by Yoshikazu Uchida and was completed in 1940. There were growing concerns regarding aging and earthquake-resistance; and, in 1997, anti-seismic reinforcement was completed. It is used by the Department of Applied Physics, School of Engineering, and the Department of Mathematical Engineering and Information Physics.
- Faculty of Engineering buildings 7–10.
- Faculty of Engineering Building 11 was designed by Yoshitake Yasumi and was completed in 1968. It was built at a time when high-rise construction was in vogue, and has 9 floors. It has a red tile exterior in keeping with Uchida Gothic. Earthquake-resistant-strength anti-seismic reinforcement was completed in 2006. It is used by the Department of Civil Engineering and by the Department of Architecture.
- Faculty of Engineering buildings 12–13.
- Faculty of Engineering Building 14 was designed by Hisao Koyama and was completed in 1998. It is used by the Department of Urban Engineering and the Department of Precision Engineering.
- The experimental water tank room was completed—with a Kaibo Gikai (海防義会, donation for coastal defense), from an extra-governmental organization affiliated with the navy of the Empire of Japan—in 1937. It has a slender water cistern—85 m in length, 3.5 m in breadth, 2.2 m in depth—and a wave-making device. Although the tank is too small to be an experimental water tank for ships, it is highly accurate and is the oldest among Japan universities. On the second floor there is part of the research department of systematization.
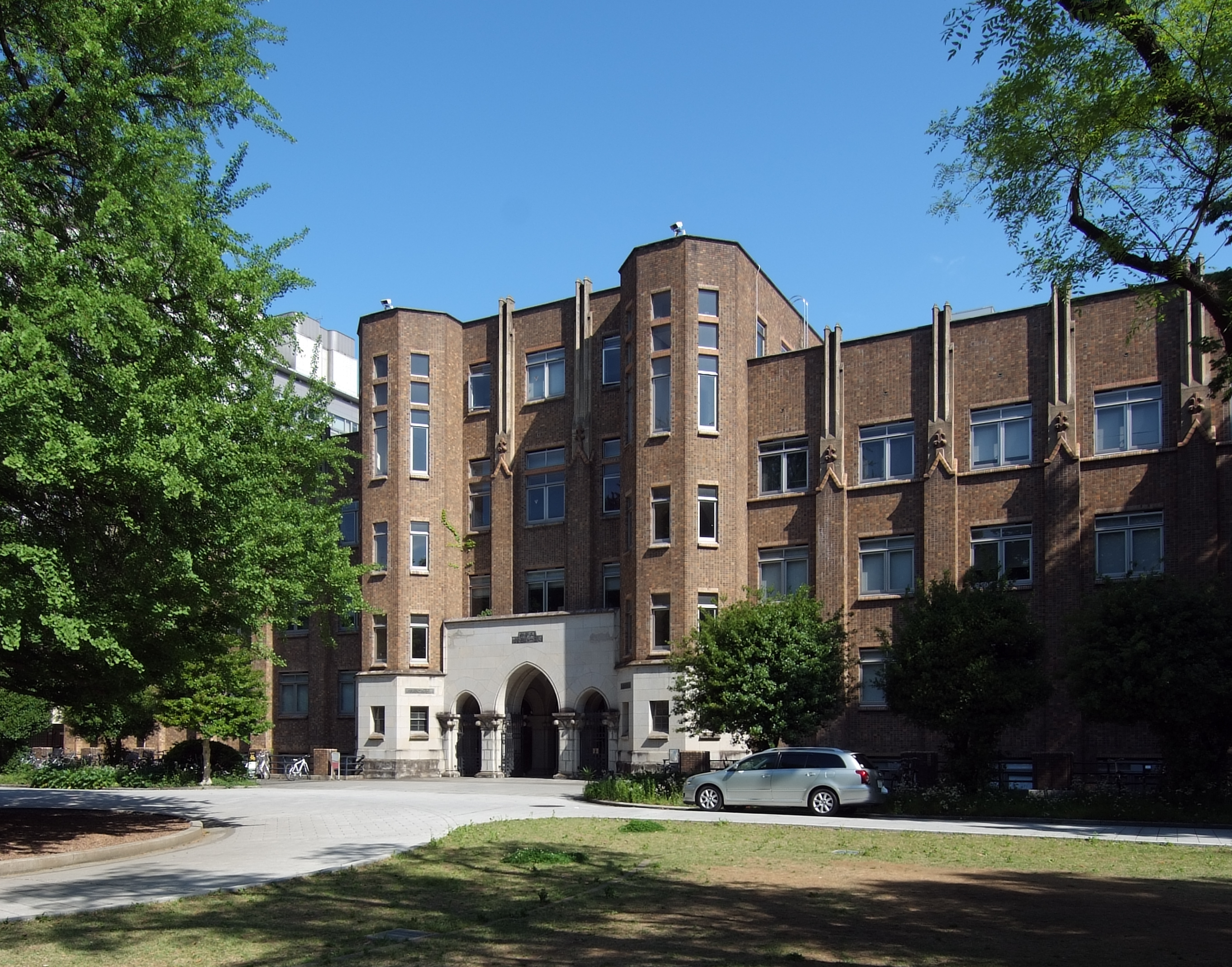
Faculty of Engineering Building 1

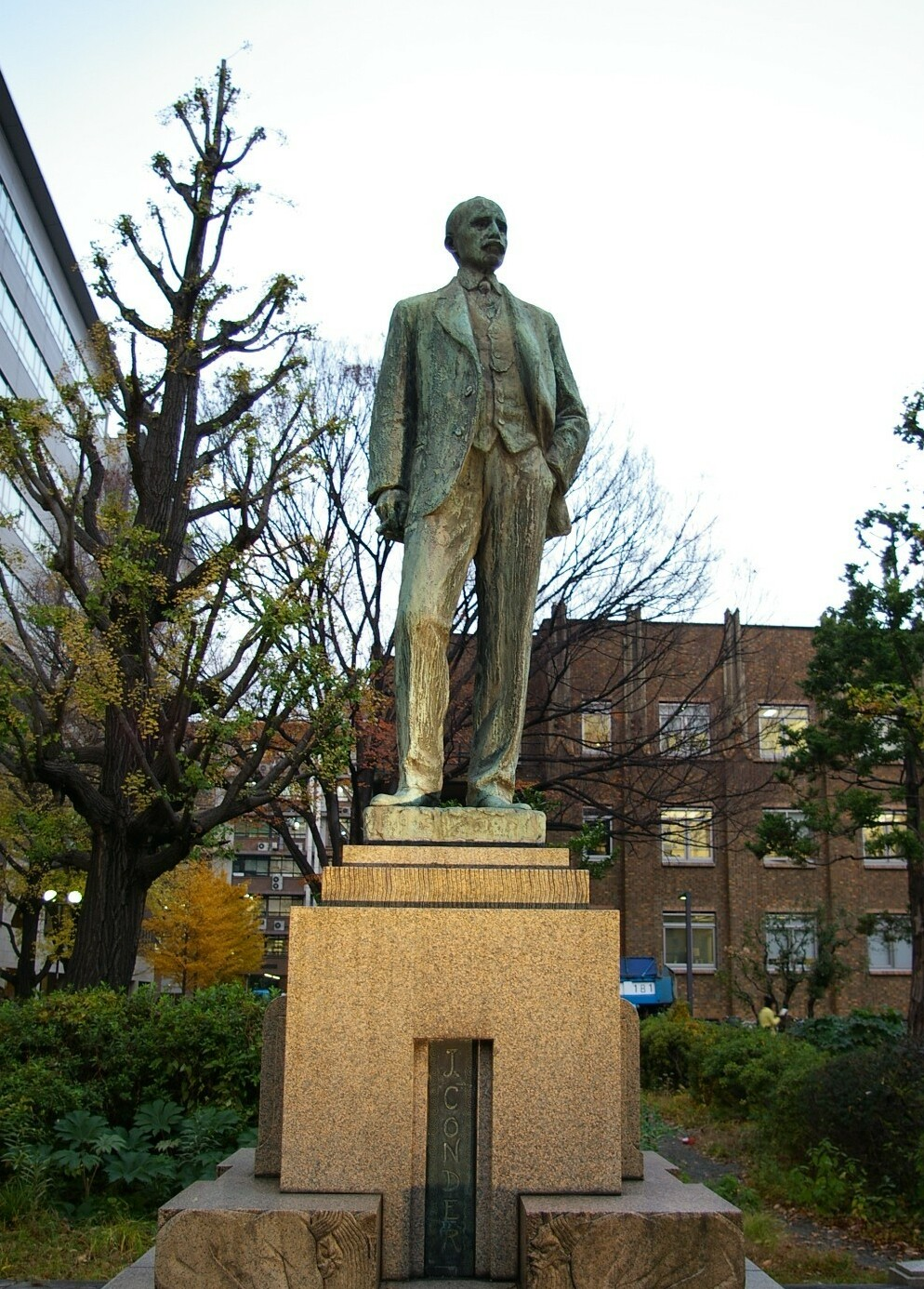
Statue of Josiah Conder in front of the Faculty of Engineering Building 1

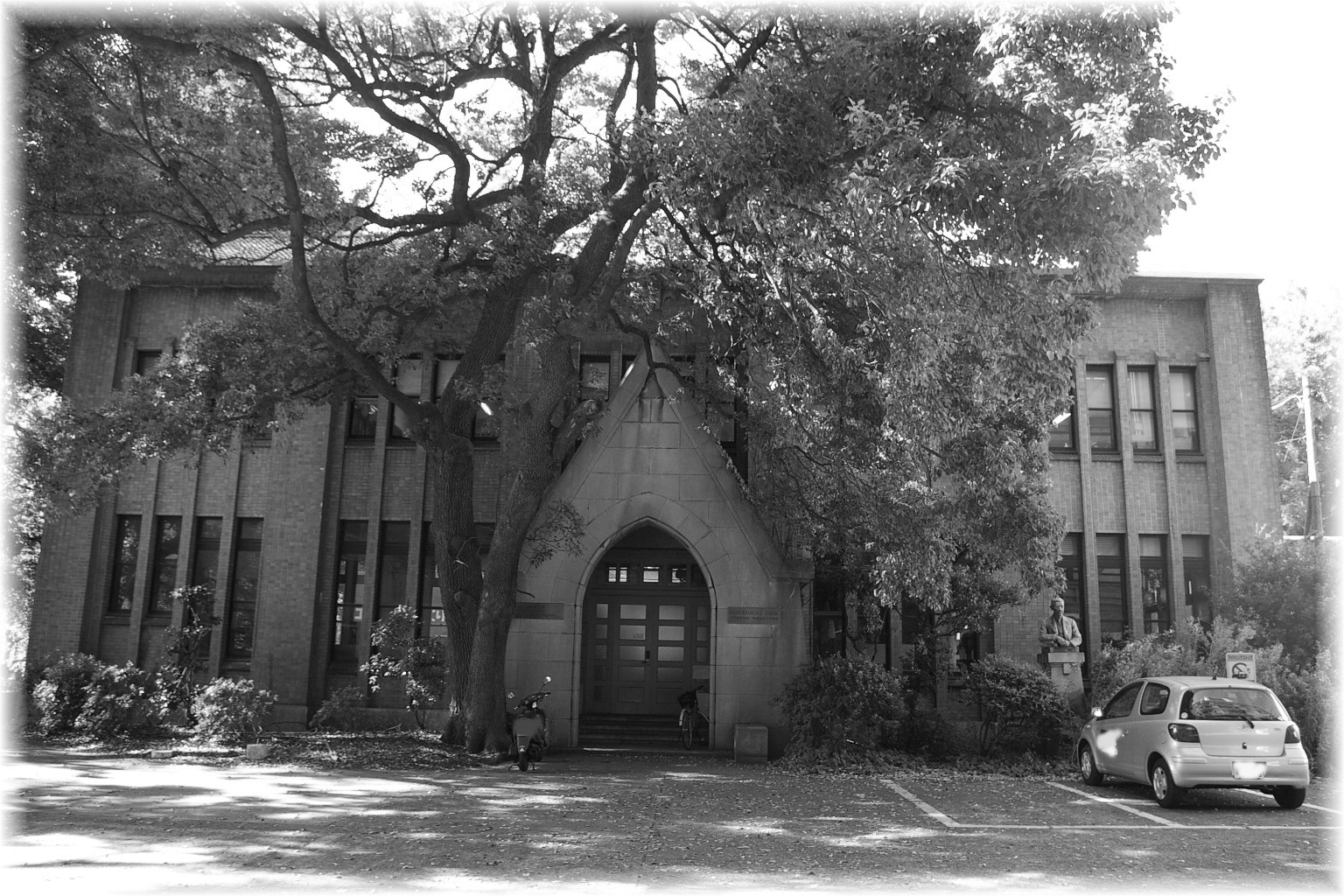
Building housing the experimental water tank room

=== Department of Literature ===
- See Faculty of Law & Letters Building 1 and 2, and Akamon General Research Facility.
- Faculty of Letters Building 3 was designed by Sachio Otani and was completed in 1987. It was constructed in the east side of the square fronting the General Library, and on the road which leads from the arcade of the Faculty of Law & Letters Building 2, south to the Faculty of Medicine Building 1, harmoniously incorporating an archway similar to that of the former building.

=== Faculty of Science ===
- Faculty of Science Old Building 1 was designed by Hideto Kishida and was completed in 1926, having been constructed in the vacant lot of the department of science building that had collapsed when the Great Kanto Earthquake struck. It was characteristic of architectural expressionism, similar to the south side of the Central Clinical Service Building 2. With the construction of the new Building 1 it was partly demolished. Only one part of it remains now, and it is planned that will be completely demolished when the construction of the new east wing to the new Building 1 is completed. The old building has an old-style elevator which Albert Einstein used during his visit to Japan in the Taishō period.
- Faculty of Science Building 1. In 1998, the west wing of this building was completed, and, in 2005, the central wing. A new east wing is planned for where the old Building 1 is now, although, as of June 2011, building work had not started. The new Building 1 is at times called Shin Ichigo-kan (新1号館, New Building 1). It is used by the physics department, department of astronomy, earth planetary physics department, earth planetary environment department, and the research center of the department of elementary particle physics. The office of the department of science is located on the ground floor of the west wing. It is designed in keeping with Uchida Gothic, but as it is a high-rise building, it is usually said that it spoils the view. Koshiba Hall commemorates Nobel Prize-winning Masatoshi Koshiba, ex-professor of the department of science.
- Faculty of Science Building 2 was designed by Yoshikazu Uchida and was completed in 1934. Most buildings of the department of science are clustered just east of Yasuda Auditorium, but this building is near Aka-mon (Red Gate), to the southwest. It is almost a twin of the Faculty of Medicine Building 1, across the street to the east. It is used by the biology department, and had been used by the faculties of geological science, mineralogy, and geography, they being the earth planetary environmental department now.
- Faculty of Science Chemistry East Wing is the oldest school building, designed by Kokichi Yamaguchi in a unique classical style, and completed in 1916, well before the Great Kanto Earthquake struck, and thus older than the Uchida Gothic buildings. It is L-shaped, and now linked at both ends with other buildings of the chemistry complex. In 1984, interior renovation work was done. The entrance facing the road, near the Todai konai (東大構内, Tokyo University campus) bus stop, is now shut, visitors entering from the adjoining buildings of the chemistry complex. In the future there are plans to further develop the chemistry complex with high-rise structures, but the East Wing is to be preserved.
- Faculty of Science Chemistry Complex. Originally, the chemistry department was located in Faculty of Science Building 1. Then new buildings were constructed for departmental expansion. The Chemistry Main Building was completed in 1962, and is adjacent to the East Wing, also now called Kagaku Kyukan (化学旧館, Chemistry Old Wing). The West Wing was completed in 1983. Along with Faculty of Science buildings 4 and 7, they form an integrated complex, called Rigaku-bu Kagaku Danchi (理学部化学団地, Faculty of Science Chemistry Complex｜), and are circularly linked together as follows:

Chemistry East Wing→Chemistry Main Building→Chemistry West Wing→Faculty of Science Building 4→Faculty of Science Building 7→Chemistry East Wing

=== Faculty of Economics ===
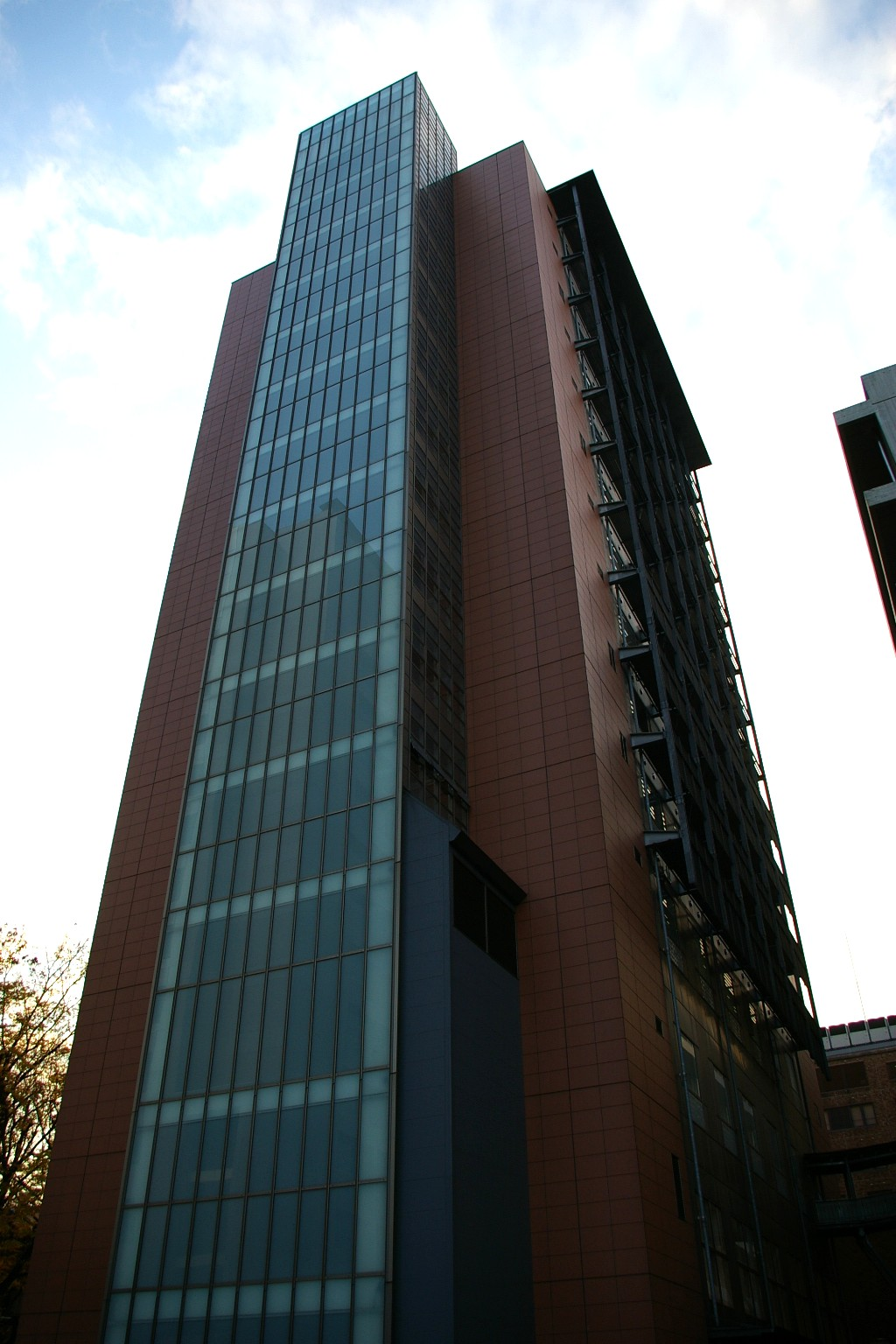
Economics Research Bldg.

- Economics Research Building was completed in 2003, and named Shin-kan (新館, New Wing). It is a 14-story building, with a basement lounge—where students chat, read books, and study—and computer lab; class and study rooms on the first through third floors; the Center for Advanced Research in Finance on the fourth floor; the economics department office on the fifth floor; and with floors 7 to 14 housing laboratories, offices, and other facilities.
- Akamon General Research Building is a building located on the south side of Akamon, and was completed, as the administration building of the economics department, in 1965. It had been called Department of Economics New Building; but when the newer Economics Research Building was constructed, it became Kyu-kan (旧館, Old Building), or Akamon to (赤門棟, Akamon Building). (Note: In the economics school handbook, floors 6 and 7 are denoted as Bekkan (別館, Annex)) In 1984, the west wing was built, designed by Koyama Hisao, on the site of Tsubaki-yama (椿山, Camelia Hill).

In 2003, the Economics Research Building was completed and most of the department of economics was relocated there. The Akamon Building was renovated and became a general research building shared by the departments of literature, economics, education, and social science. The renovation was mainly for the purpose of seismic reinforcement, but also to add details to harmonize with the surrounding Uchida Gothic buildings, such as Faculty of Medicine Building 2. On the ground floor is the University co-op Akamon Shop. On the third floor is the departmental library and archive, as well as the walkway to the Economics Research Building.

- Economics Research Annex (Kojima Hall) is located in the vacant lot of the beer garden of Gakusi Kaikan (学士会館, Bachelor Hall). The Center for Advanced Research in Finance, the Management Education and Research Center, and the Center for International Research on the Japanese Economy are due to move from Economics Research Building to this building.

=== Graduate School of Interdisciplinary Information Studies ===
- Fukutake Hall was constructed—with a donation from Soichiro Fukutake, representative director and CEO of Benesse Corporation—as a part of the 130th anniversary celebrations. Designed by Tadao Ando, and located north of Aka-mon and the Communication Center, its completion, at first scheduled for November 2007, was delayed until 26 March 2008. In consideration of the environment, half of the building is underground.

The art project Thinking Forest, supported by TOPPAN, used the temporary enclosure of construction site, teachers and students of Graduate School of Interdisciplinary Information Studies participating.

== Yayoi campus ==
- Nōgakubu seimon (農学部正門, Agriculture Main Gate) was designed by Yoshikazu Uchida, and completed in 1937. It is the main gate of Yayoi campus, Yayoi Gate being an entrance to Hongo campus. Renovation was completed 23 March 2003; the gate lamp was restored in 2005.
- Faculty of Agriculture Building 1 was designed by Yoshikazu Uchida, and completed in 1930. It is located inside the main gate, on the right, or south, side after entering.
- Faculty of Agriculture Building 2 was designed by Yoshikazu Uchida, and completed in 1936. It is located inside the main gate, on the left, across from Faculty of Agriculture Building 1, and similar in plan to it.
- Faculty of Agriculture Building 3 was designed by Yoshikazu Uchida, and completed in 1941. It was selected by the Tokyo Metropolitan Government as an historic building. It is located facing the main gate, past buildings 1 and 2, and houses the agriculture department office. The basement has co-op stores and a cafeteria.

== Asano campus ==
- Takeda Building is located at the west end of Asano campus. It was constructed with a donation from Ikuo Takeda, founder of the Advantest Corporation (ex-Takeda Riken Industry Co., Ltd), in 2003. It is the first building on the campus named after an individual person, as, for example, Yasuda Auditorium is not a formal title. Takeda Building houses the Graduate School of Engineering and the VLSI Design and Education Center.

== See also ==
- Institute of Medical Science (Japan)
- Constitutions of Kyushu University
- Campus of Keio University
- Campus of Kyushu University
