= Inokichi Kubo =

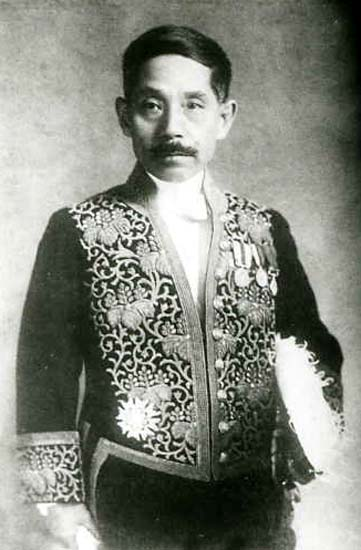
- Born: 26 December 1874
- Died: 12 November 1939 (aged 64)
- Education: Tokyo Imperial University
- Occupation: Professor
- Medical career
- Field: Otorhinolaryngology
- Institutions: Fukuoka Medical School
- Awards: Légion d'honneur

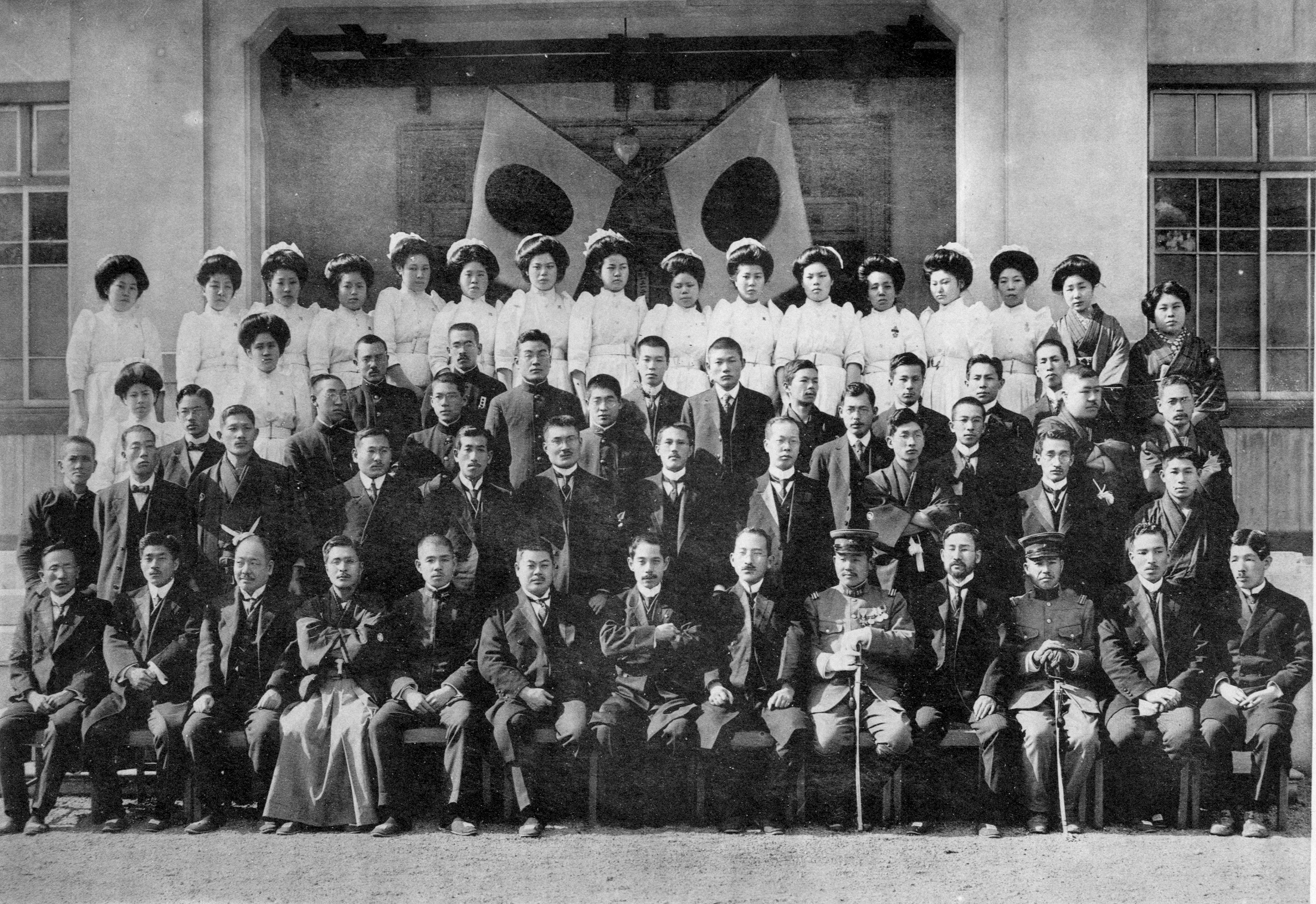
Prof. Kubo (front row, 7th from the left) and his department in 1920

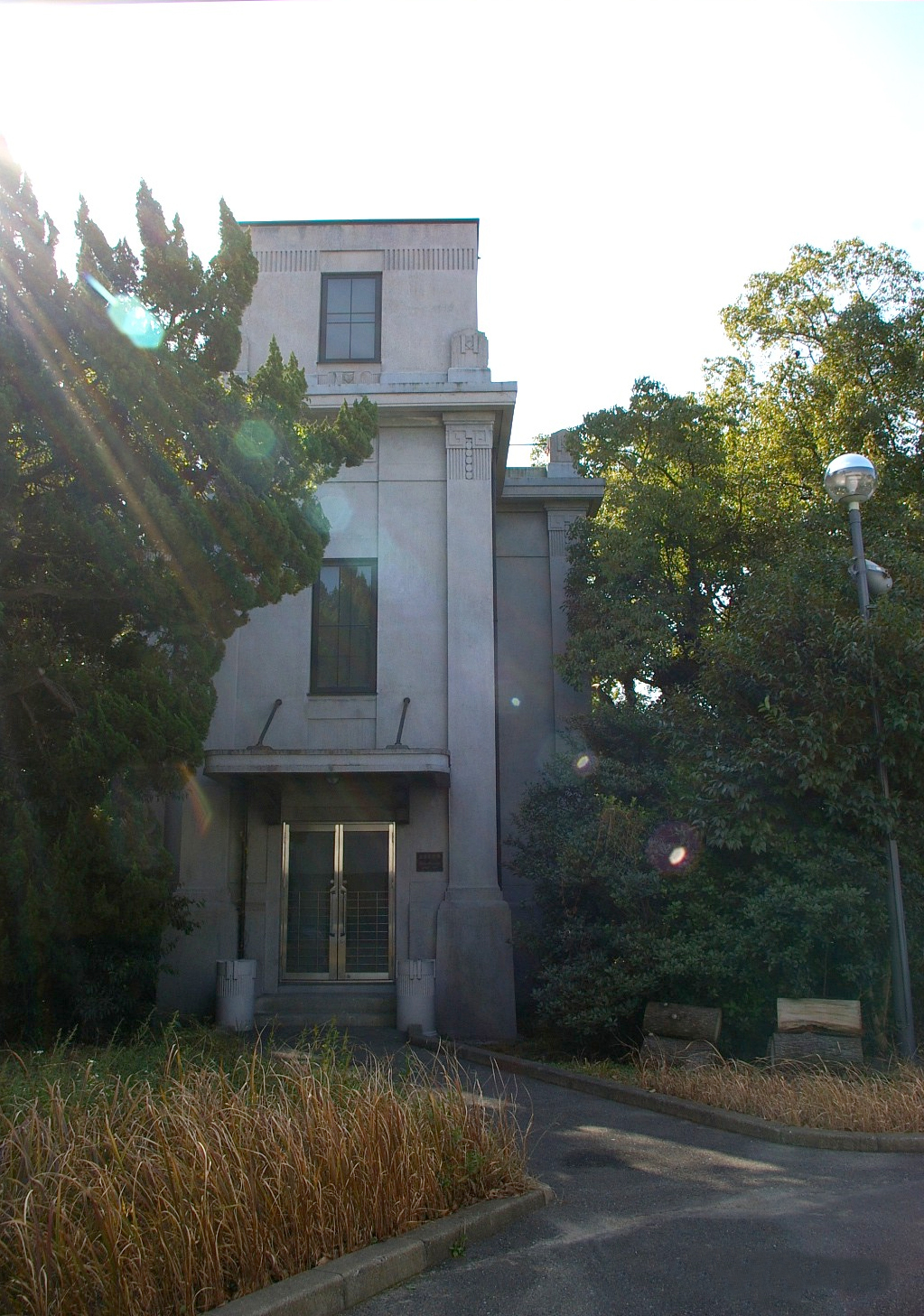
Kubo Museum

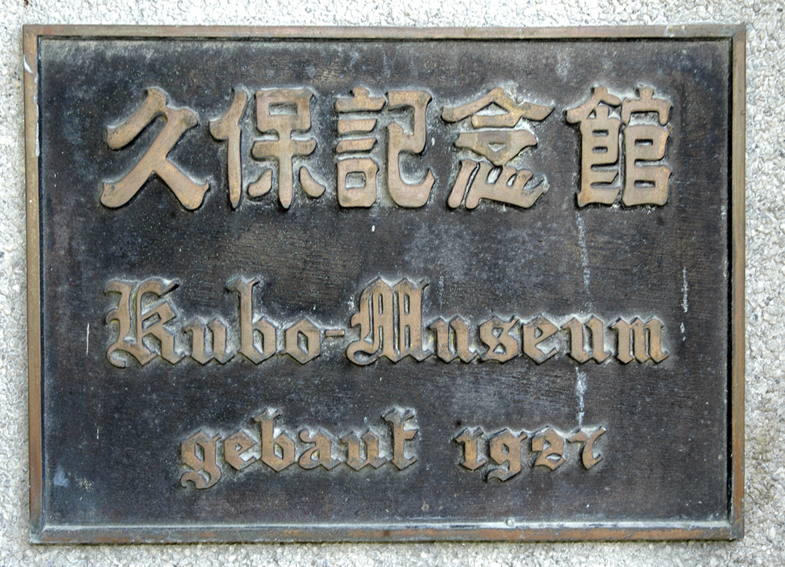
Kubo Museum: doorplate in German

Inokichi Kubo (久保 猪之吉, Kubo Inokichi; 26 December 1874 – 12 November 1939) was a Japanese pioneer of otorhinolaryngology and professor at Fukuoka Medical School (now part of Kyushu University).

He graduated from The Medical School of Tokyo Imperial University (東京帝国大学医科大学, Tokyo Teikoku Daigaku Ika Daigaku) in 1900, and went on an overseas study program to Gustav Killian at University of Freiburg in 1903. Four years later he returned to Japan, where he took up the post of professor at Fukuoka Medical School.

His wife, Yorie (より江), was a haiku poet from Matsuyama. As Kubo was also a well-known poet, their home in Fukuoka soon became the social center for poets in Northern Kyushu while attracting poets and novelists from afar.

One of his patients was the poet Takashi Nagatsuka. Kubo was one of the pioneers of otorhinolaryngology in Japan, and was selected as a representative of his country for the first International Congress of Oto-Rhino-Laryngology at Copenhagen (1913). In 1934 he was awarded the Légion d'honneur.

Kubo was famous for his Haiku (俳句)- and Waka (和歌)-poetry, started as a pupil of Kyoshi Takahama. As a poet he found a mentor in Naobumi Ochiai, with Saishu Onoe formed Ikazuchi kai, and created friendship with Byakuren Yanagihara. In February 1913, Kubo began publishing a magazine "Enigma" (『エニグマ』) for his circle of poets and haiku. It was in its May issue that Byakuren Yanagihara contributed her work "Hitou" (『緋桃』) (Himomo, peach flowers in bright pink), and in the same issue, Kubo and his wife also published their workes as well; Inokichi "Aruto Haideruberuku ni tsuite" (『「アルトハイデルベルク」に就いて』) (Thinking about 'Alt-Heidelberg') and Yorie "Tsukushi kudari" (『筑紫下り』) (Sailing down Tsukushi river).

There is a small museum at Kyushu University honouring his achievements.

== Book for Dr. Ino Kubo's 60th Birthday ==
A book to commemorate Dr. Inokichi Kubo's 60th birthday was dedicated by his friends and colleagues in the field of otorhinolaryngology, titled with his nickname as "Ino Kubo". Numerous notable researchers and practitioners contributed.
