= Shichijo Bridge =

Bridge in Kyoto, Japan

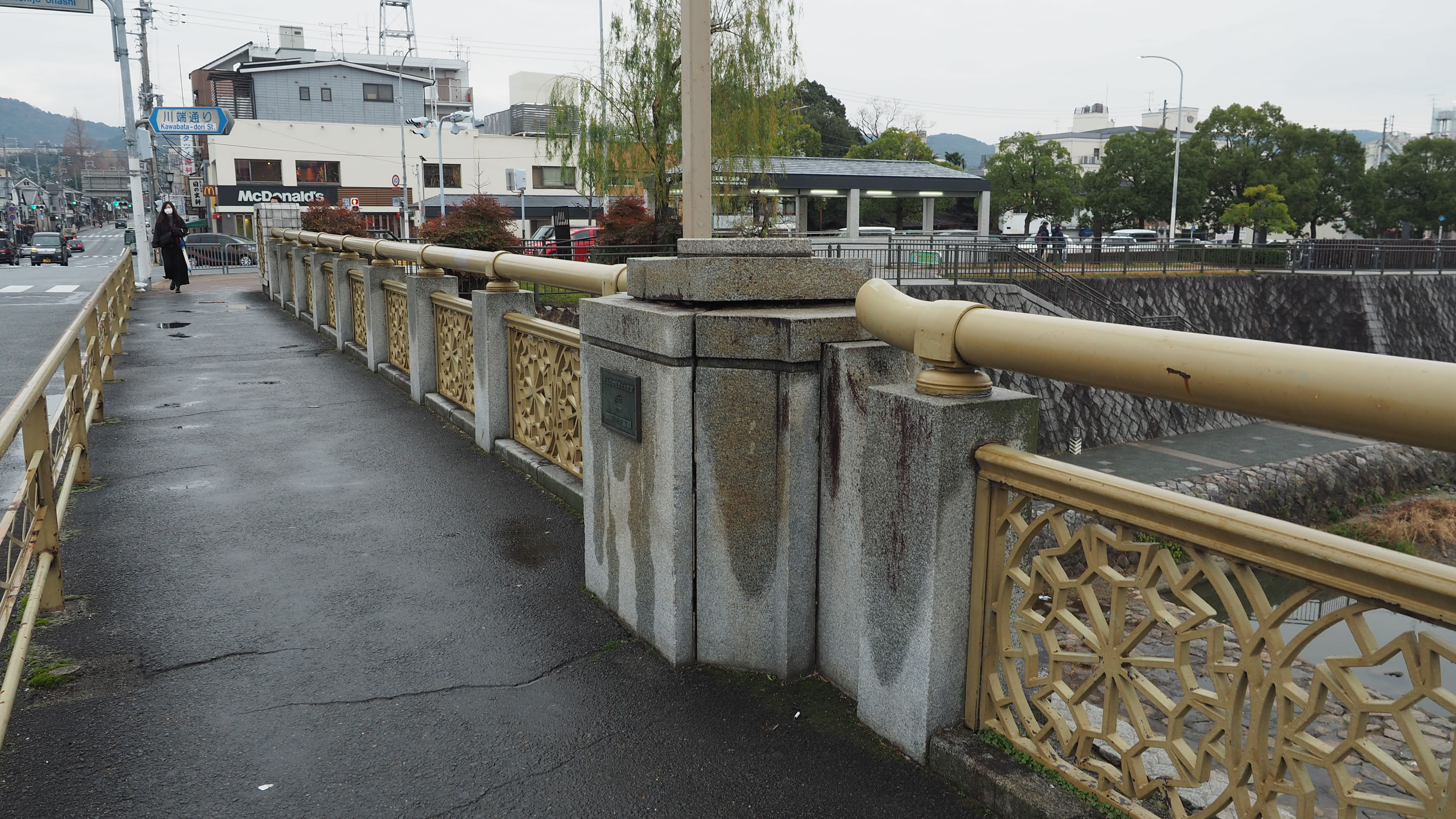
- The bridge in 2019
- Coordinates: 34.9893°N 135.7672°E
- Locale: Kyoto, Japan

Shichijo Bridge is a bridge in Kyoto, Japan.
