= Bunkyō =

Bunkyō 文京区
- Special ward
- Bunkyō City
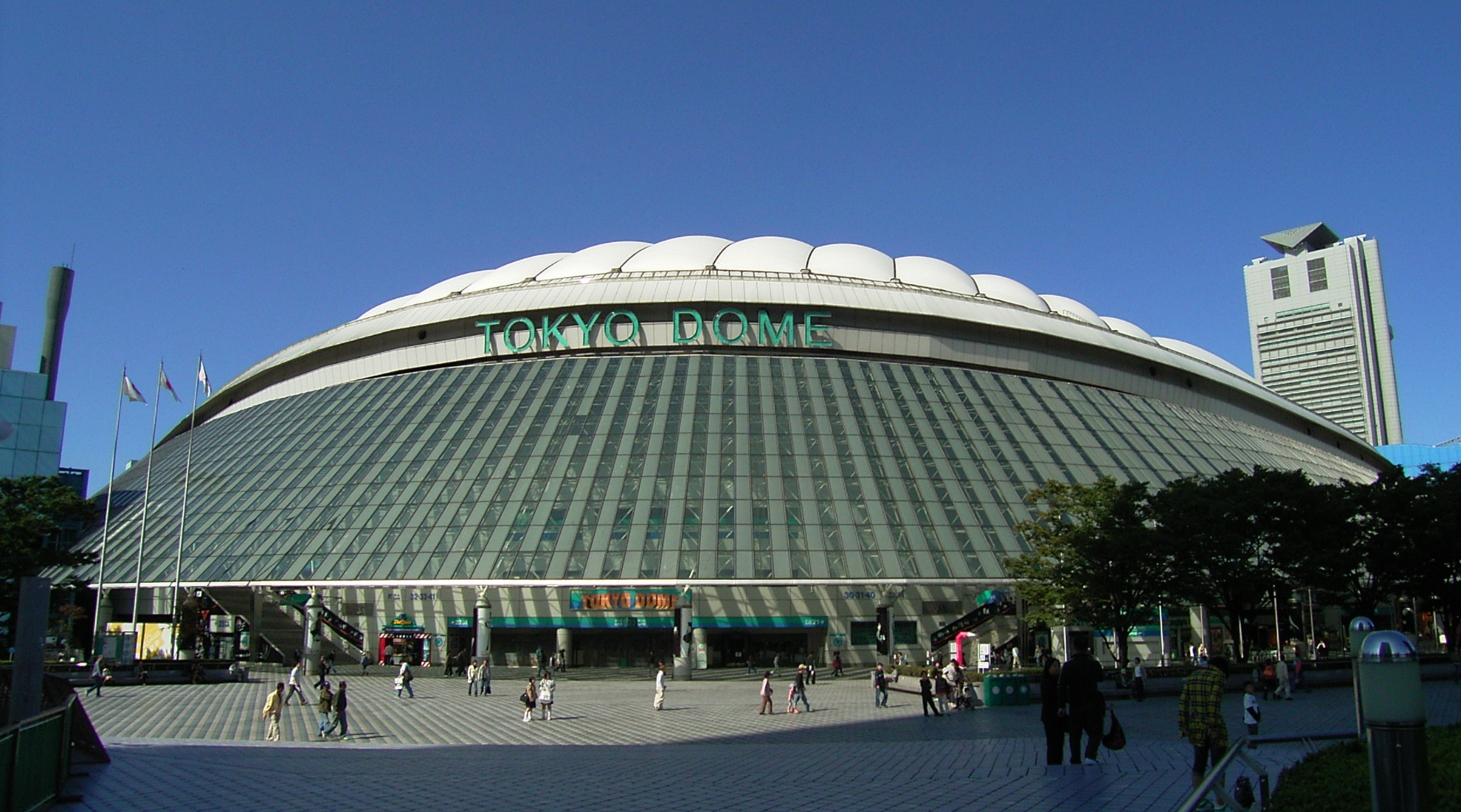
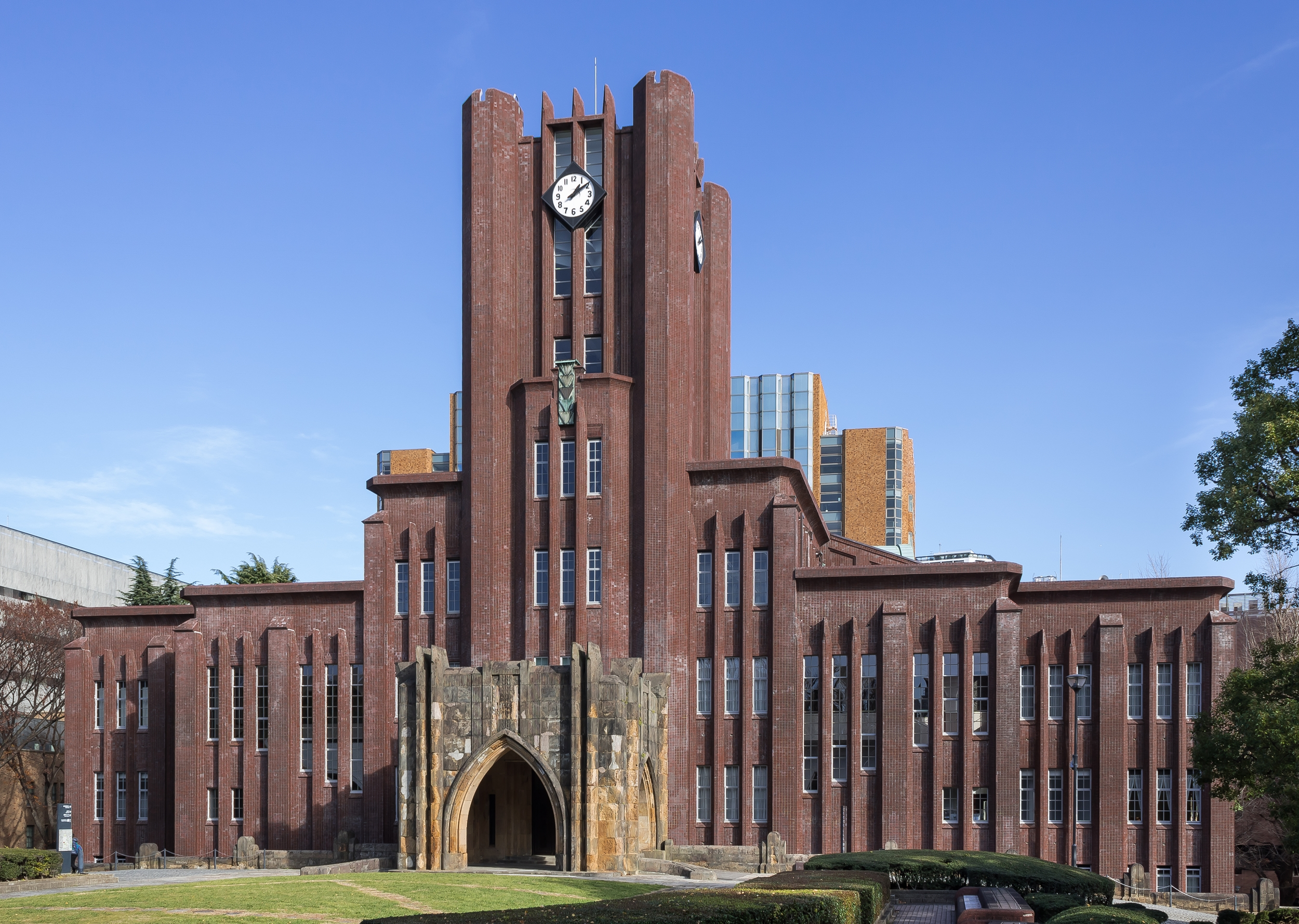
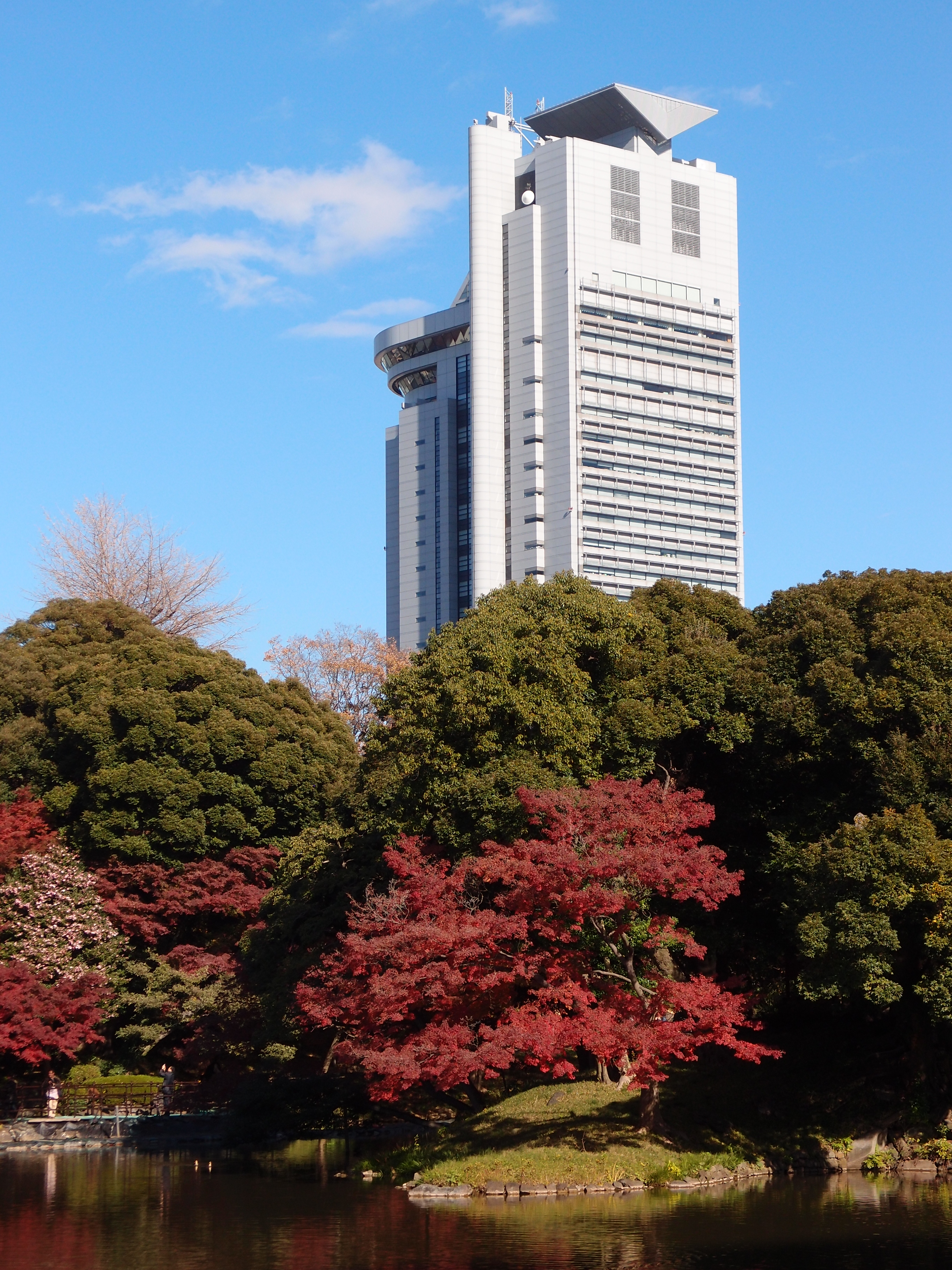
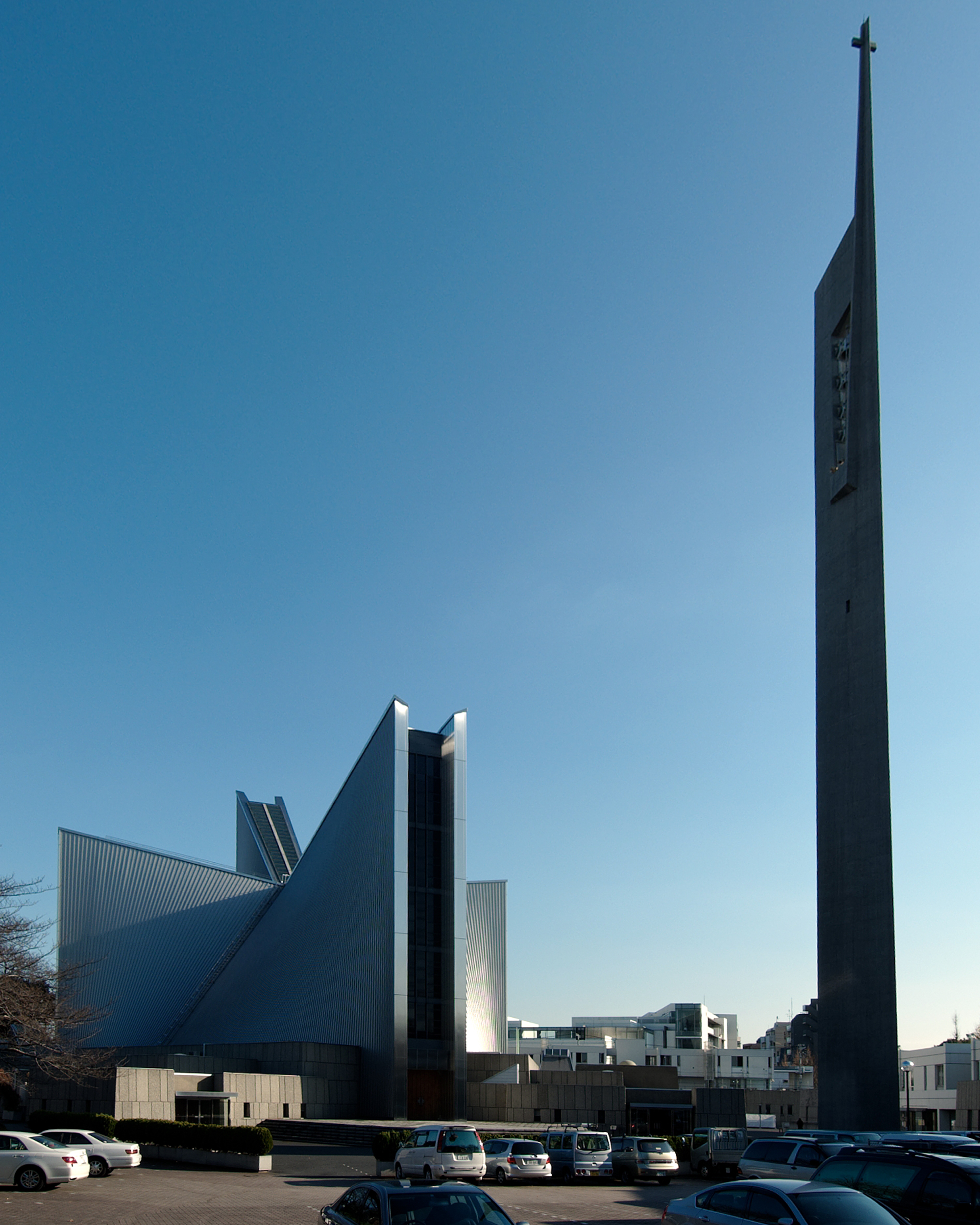
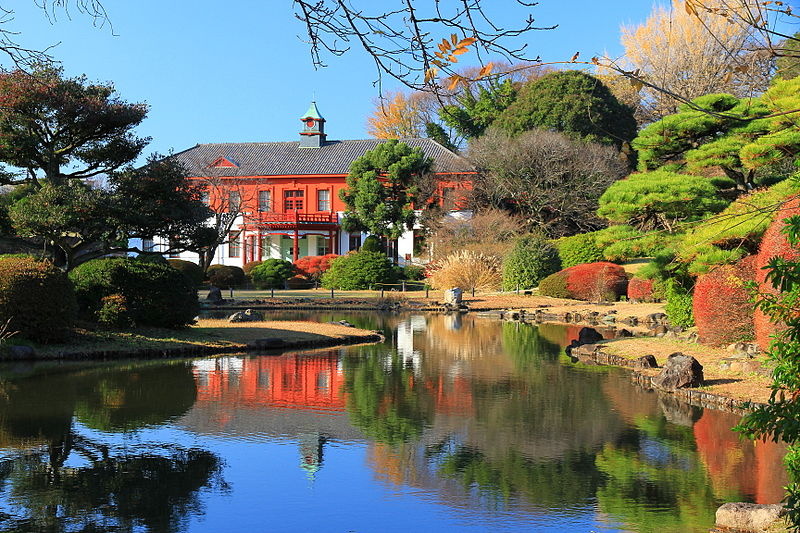
- Tokyo Dome University of Tokyo Bunkyo Civic Center St. Mary's Cathedral, Tokyo Koishikawa Botanical Garden

- Flag Emblem

- Location of Bunkyō in Tokyo

- Location in Japan
- Coordinates: 35°43′N 139°45′E
- Country: Japan
- Region: Kantō
- Prefecture: Tokyo

Government
  - Mayor: Hironobu Narisawa

Area
  - Total: 11.29 km^{2} (4.36 sq mi)

Population (October 1, 2020)
  - Total: 240,069
  - Density: 21,263/km^{2} (55,070/sq mi)
- Time zone: UTC+09:00 (JST)
- City hall address: Kasuga 1-16-21, Bunkyo-ku, Tokyo; 112-6555
- Website: www.city.bunkyo.lg.jp
- Symbols
- Flower: Azalea
- Tree: Ginkgo biloba

Bunkyō (文京区, Bunkyō-ku; Japanese pronunciation: [bɯ̈̀ŋ̟́ʲ.k̟ʲj̊ó̞ó̞, -k̟ʲj̊ó̞ò̞.kɯ̈̀, bɯ̈́ŋ̟́ʲ-]) is a special ward in the Tokyo Metropolis in Japan. Situated in the middle of the ward area, Bunkyō is a residential and educational center. Beginning in the Meiji period, literati like Natsume Sōseki, as well as scholars and politicians have lived there. Bunkyō is home to the Tokyo Dome, Judo's Kōdōkan, and the University of Tokyo's Hongo Campus.

It was formed in 1947 as a merger of Hongo and Koishikawa wards following Tokyo City's transformation into Tokyo Metropolis. The modern Bunkyo ward exhibits contrasting Shitamachi and Yamanote geographical and cultural division. The Nezu and Sendagi neighborhoods in the ward's eastern corner are attached to the Shitamachi area in Ueno. On the other hand, the remaining areas of the ward typically represent Yamanote districts.

As of 2022, the ward has a population of 240,069 (including about 8,500 foreign residents), and a population density of 21,263 inhabitants per square kilometre (55,070/sq mi). The total area is 11.29 square kilometres (4.36 sq mi).

== History ==
Bunkyo was formed in 1947 as a merger of Hongo and Koishikawa wards following Tokyo City's transformation into Tokyo Metropolis.

== Geography ==
=== Districts and neighborhoods ===
There are approximately twenty districts in the area and these are as follows:

Koishikawa Area

- Hakusan
- Kasuga
- Kohinata
- Koishikawa
- Kōraku
- Mejirodai
- Otowa
- Ōtsuka
- Sekiguchi
- Sengoku
- Suidō

Hongō Area

- Hongō
- Honkomagome
- Mukōgaoka
- Nezu
- Nishikata
- Sendagi
- Yayoi
- Yushima

== Politics and government ==
Bunkyo is governed by Mayor Hironobu Narisawa, an independent supported by the Liberal Democratic Party, Democratic Party of Japan and Komeito. The city council has 34 elected members.

== Economy ==
The publishing company Kodansha has its headquarters in the ward, and Kodansha International has its headquarters in the Otowa YK Building in the ward. The drugstore chain Tomod's has its headquarters in the ward. Penta-Ocean, the construction firm specializing in marine works and land reclamation also has its headquarters in Bunkyo. The automobile manufacturer Toyota has its Tokyo headquarters in the ward.

== Demographics ==
By 2025, increasing numbers of Chinese immigrant families, of wealthy backgrounds, were moving to the ward to enroll their children in local elementary schools.

Historical population
Year	Pop.	±%
1908	189,230	—
1920	282,080	+49.1%
1930	288,242	+2.2%
1940	300,801	+4.4%
1945	92,748	−69.2%
1950	190,746	+105.7%
1960	259,383	+36.0%
1970	234,326	−9.7%
1980	202,351	−13.6%
1990	181,269	−10.4%
2000	176,017	−2.9%
2010	206,626	+17.4%
2020	240,069	+16.2%
Source: Censuses (Note: For years prior to 1950, figures cover the area of present-day Bunkyo-ku.)

== Cityscape ==
In 2025, real estate agency worker Bun Kaito stated that "The ward is also renowned for safety, often ranked as the safest in statistics."

== Landmarks ==
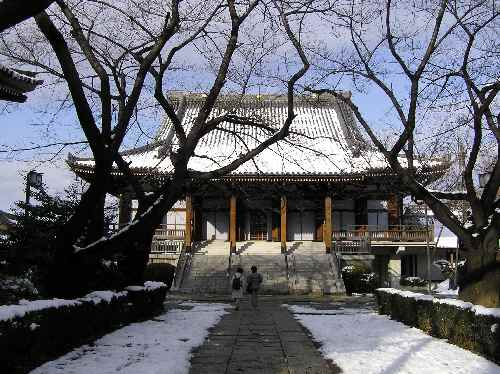
Denzū-in

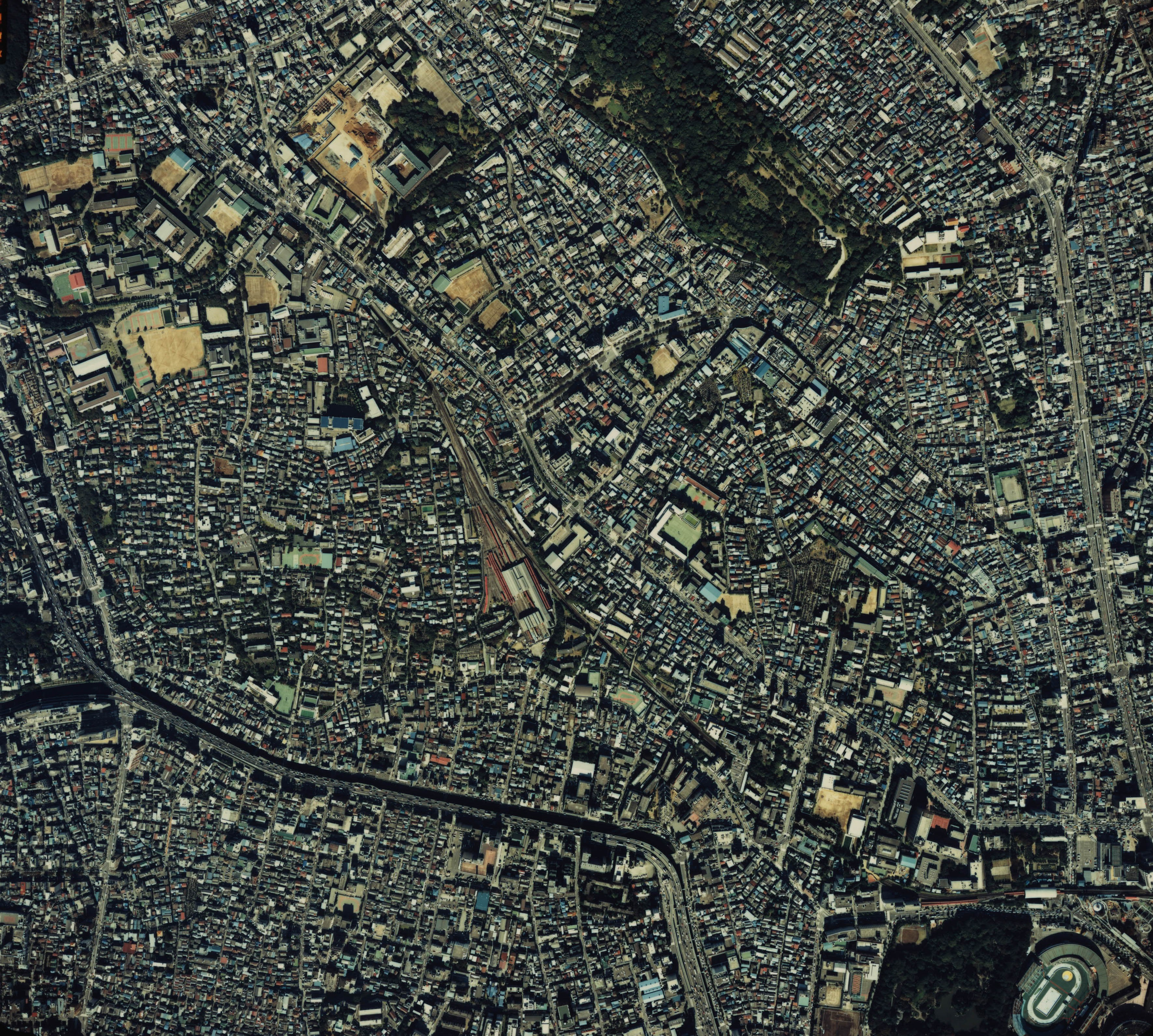
Aerial view of Bunkyo (southwest)

- Chinzan-so Garden
- Denzū-in Temple
- Gokoku-ji Temple
- Harimasaka Sakura Colonnade
- Hatoyama Hall
- Kisshō-ji
- Kodansha Noma Memorial Museum
- Kodokan Judo Institute
- Koishikawa Botanical Garden
- Koishikawa Kōrakuen
- Nezu Shrine
- Nippon Medical School
- Rikugien Garden
- Shin-Edogawa Garden
- Tokyo Cathedral (St. Mary's Cathedral)
- Tokyo Dome
- Tokyo Dome City
- Toshimagaoka Imperial Cemetery
- Toyo University
- Tōyō Bunko "Oriental Library", Japan's largest Asian studies library
- University of Tokyo
- Yanaka Cemetery
- Yushima Seidō

== Education ==
As of 2025 Bunkyo built up a reputation as having strong educational facilities, and this stems from institutions being established in the Meiji era in former samurai estates.

=== Universities and colleges ===
==== National ====
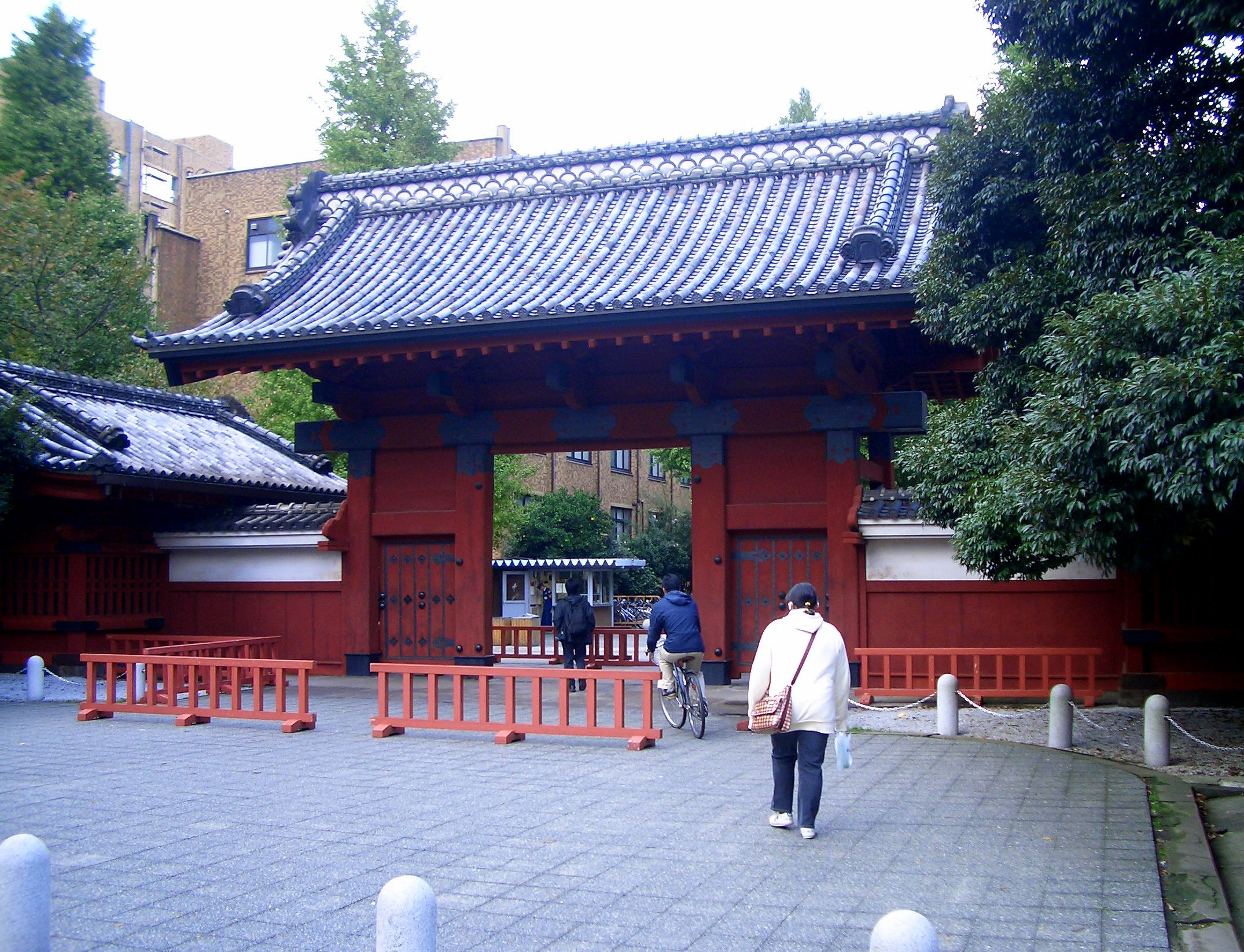
Akamon gate at the University of Tokyo

- Institute of Science Tokyo Yushima Campus
- Ochanomizu University
- University of Tsukuba Ōtsuka Campus
- University of Tokyo Hongō Campus

==== Private ====
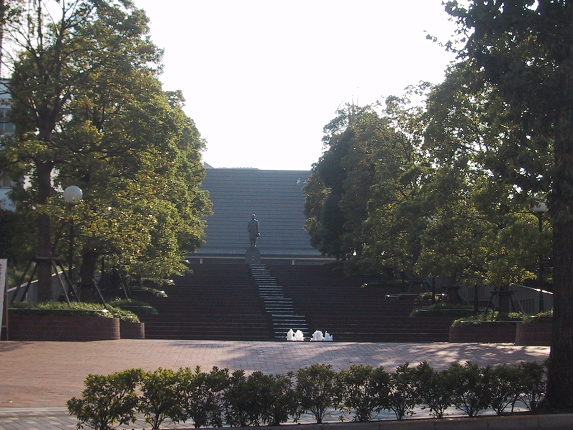
Hosuinomori at Toyo University

- Atomi University
- Juntendo University
- Takushoku University
- Chuo University Engineering department
- Tokyo Woman's Christian University
- Toyo University
- Toyo Gakuen University
- Nippon Medical School
- Japan Women's University
- Bunkyo Gakuin University
- Bunkyo Gakuin College
- International College for Postgraduate Buddhist Studies

=== Primary and secondary schools ===
Nationally-operated high schools:

- Ochanomizu University High School
- Junior and Senior High School at Otsuka, University of Tsukuba

Public high schools are operated by the Tokyo Metropolitan Government Board of Education.

- Kogei High School
- Koishikawa High School
- Mukogaoka High School
- Takehaya High School

The metropolis operates the Koishikawa Secondary Education School.

The metropolis operates the Bunkyo School for the Blind.

Public elementary and junior high schools are operated by Bunkyo Board of Education.

Municipal junior high schools:

- No. 1 Junior High School (第一中学校)
- No. 3 Junior High School (第三中学校)
- No. 6 Junior High School (第六中学校)
- No. 8 Junior High School (第八中学校)
- No. 9 Junior High School (第九中学校)
- No. 10 Junior High School (第十中学校)
- Bunrin Junior High School (文林中学校)
- Hongodai Junior High School (本郷台中学校)
- Meidai Junior High School (茗台中学校)
- Otowa Junior High School (音羽中学校)

Municipal elementary schools:

- Aoyagi Elementary School (青柳小学校)
- Hayashicho Elementary School (林町小学校)
- Hongo Elementary School (本郷小学校)
- Kagomachi Elementary School (駕籠町小学校)
- Kanatomi Elementary School (金富小学校)
- Kohinata Daimachi Elementary School (小日向台町小学校)
- Komamoto Elementary School (駒本小学校)
- Kubomachi Elementary School (窪町小学校)
- Meika Elementary School (明化小学校)
- Nezu Elementary School (根津小学校)
- Otsuka Elementary School (大塚小学校)
- Rekisen Elementary School (礫川小学校)
- Sasugaya Elementary School (指ケ谷小学校)
- Seishi Elementary School (誠之小学校)
- Sekiguchi Daimachi Elementary School (関口台町小学校)
- Sendagi Elementary School (千駄木小学校)
- Shiomi Elementary School (汐見小学校)
- Showa Elementary School (昭和小学校)
- Yanagicho Elementary School (柳町小学校)
- Yushima Elementary School (湯島小学校)

Four of those elementary schools (Kubomachi, Seishi, Sendagi, and Showa) are known as "3S1K", as having a very prominent status; by 2025 many Chinese immigrant families, looking for strong educational facilities, moved to the attendance zones of those schools to enroll their children there.

== Culture ==
In 2025 Kaito highlighted that Koishikawa-Kōrakuen made the ward attractive to Chinese families.

=== Museums ===
- Bunkyo Museum
- Eisei Bunko Museum
- Japanese Baseball Hall of Fame
- Kodansha Noma Memorial Museum
- Koishikawa Annex
- Printing Museum, Tokyo
- The University Museum, The University of Tokyo
- Tokyo Waterworks Historical Museum
- Yayoi Museum

Former museums

- Orugoru no Chiisana Hakubutsukan ("The Museum of Mechanical Musical Instruments") - Closed on May 15, 2013.
- Koishikawa Ukiyo-e Art Museum - Closed in 2014

== Transportation ==
=== Train stations ===
==== Toei subway lines ====
- Toei Mita Line: Sengoku, Hakusan, Kasuga, Suidōbashi
- Toei Ōedo Line: Iidabashi, Kasuga, Hongō Sanchōme

==== Tokyo Metro subway lines ====
- Tokyo Metro Chiyoda Line: Sendagi, Nezu, Yushima
- Tokyo Metro Marunouchi Line: Shin-Ōtsuka, Myōgadani, Kōrakuen, Hongō Sanchōme, Ochanomizu
- Tokyo Metro Yūrakuchō Line: Gokokuji, Edogawabashi
- Tokyo Metro Namboku Line: Kōrakuen, Tōdaimae, Honkomagome

=== Highways ===
Shuto Expressway

- No.5 Ikebukuro Route (Takebashi JCT—Bijogi JCT)

== Sister cities ==
Bunkyō has a sister-city relationship with Kaiserslautern in the Rhineland-Palatinate of Germany.

== Notable people from Bunkyō ==
- Hayao Miyazaki (Nihongo: 宮崎 駿, Miyazaki Hayao), Japanese animator, director, producer, screenwriter, author, manga artist and one of the co-founders of Studio Ghibli
- Makiko Tanaka (Nihongo: 田中 眞紀子, Tanaka Makiko), Japanese politician and daughter of Kakuei Tanaka (former Prime Minister of Japan)
- Osamu Noguchi (Nihongo: 野口 修, Noguchi Osamu), the creator of Kickboxing
- Kaito Ishikawa (Nihongo: 石川 界人, Ishikawa Kaito), Japanese voice actor
- Yukio Hatoyama (Nihongo: 鳩山 由紀夫, Hatoyama Yukio), Japanese politician and former Prime Minister of Japan
- Shinichiro Kobayashi (Nihongo: 小林 伸一郎, Kobayashi Shin'ichirō), Japanese photographer
- Teiichi Matsumaru (Nihongo: 松丸 貞一, Matsumaru Teiichi), Japanese football player
- Hiroto Muraoka (Nihongo: 村岡 博人, Muraoka Hiroto), Japanese football player
- Yu-ki Matsumura (Real Name: Noriyuki Matsumura, Nihongo: 松村 憲幸, Matsumura Noriyuki), Japanese actor and singer
- Yūko Minaguchi (Nihongo: 皆口 裕子, Minaguchi Yūko), Japanese actress, voice actress and narrator
- Yukio Tsuchiya (Nihongo: 土屋 征夫, Tsuchiya Yukio), Japanese football player (Tokyo 23 FC)
