= Bunkyo Museum =

City museum in Bunkyō, Japan

- 文京ふるさと歴史館
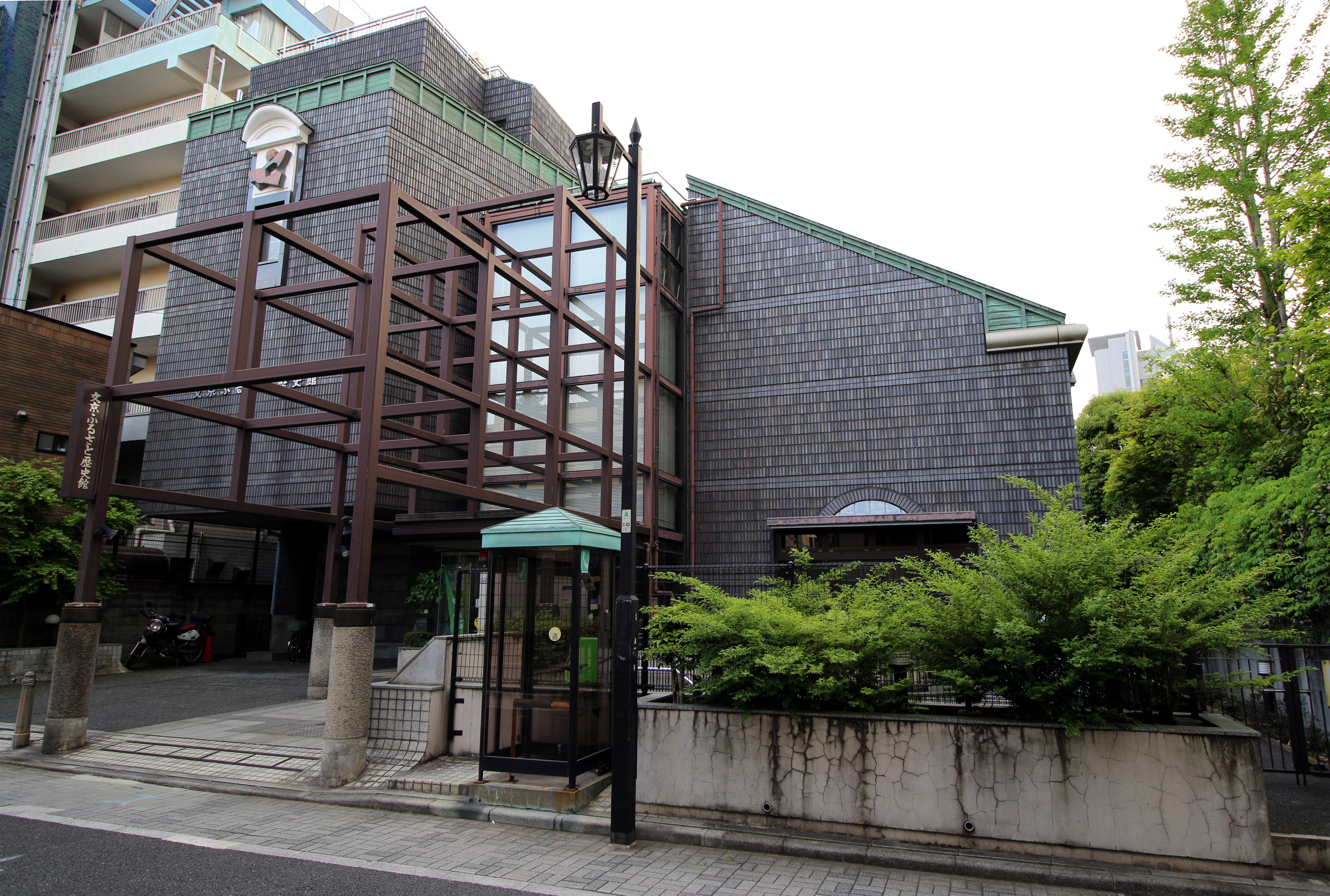
- Bunkyo Museum entrance
- Established: 1991; 35 years ago
- Location: Hongō, Bunkyō, Tokyo, Japan
- Coordinates: 35.70802125290514°N 139.75675237257676°E
- Owner: Bunkyō special ward
- Website: Official website

Bunkyo Museum (文京ふるさと歴史館, Bunkyō furusato rekishikan) is a public museum in Tokyo, Japan. It is the local history museum for the Bunkyō area. The museum was opened in April 1991. The museum has a permanent exhibition and special exhibitions. Since 1994, a newsletter, "Bunkyo Museum News" has been published once per year. In 2021, the museum celebrated its 30 year anniversary. Between 1991 and 2020 the museum has had more than 560,000 visitors.

== Exhibition ==
The museum has two floors with a main exhibition and a basement where special exhibitions are held. The main exhibition starts with the history of the Jōmon period and Yayoi period. The archaeology of the Yayoi period (900 B.C.E.–250 C.E.) is particularly relevant, as the period was named after the Yayoi neighborhood in Bunkyo ward where artifacts from the era were first found in 1884 by Dr. Shogoro Tsuboi and his colleagues. Most of the rest of the museum's exhibit space is dedicated to the Edo period through the present era. The exhibition has several scale models of old buildings and streets.
