= Mejirodai, Tokyo =

District in Bunkyo, Tokyo, Japan

Coordinates: 35.6438°N 139.3087°E

Mejirodai (目白台) is one of the districts that comprise Bunkyo in Tokyo, Japan. Divided into three sections, It currently has a population of 6,595 as of October 1, 2007.

== Geography ==
The area is an old residential neighborhood and a school zone. Most notable locations are:

- Residence of former Japanese Prime Minister Kakuei Tanaka (His daughter Makiko Tanaka is the current occupant)
- Japan Women's University
- Eisei Bunko Museum
- Wakeijuku

== Education ==
Bunkyo operates the local public elementary and middle schools.

Zoned elementary schools for parts of Meijirodai are: Ooyagi (青柳小学校) and Sekiguchidaimachi (関口台町小学校).

All of Meijirodai is zoned to Otowa Junior High School (音羽中学校).
