= Korakuen =

Kōrakuen (後楽園, "enjoy after garden") is a Japanese place name. Places named Korakuen include:

- Kōraku-en, a garden in Okayama Prefecture
- Koishikawa Kōrakuen Garden, a garden in Tokyo
- Korakuen Hall, a sports arena
- Korakuen Stadium, a former stadium
- Kōrakuen Station, a subway station
- Korakuen Velodrome, a former velodrome
