= Kisaku =

- Gender: Male

Origin
- Origin: Japanese
- Meaning: Different meanings depending on the kanji used

Kisaku (written: 茂吉 or 喜作) is a masculine Japanese given name. Notable people with the name include:

- Kisaku Itō (伊藤 熹朔; 1899–2008), Japanese art director
- Kisaku Mayekawa (前川 喜作; 1893–1986), Japanese industrialist and philanthropist
