= Kodansha Noma Memorial Museum =

Japanese art museum in Bunkyo, Tokyo

Coordinates: 35°42′50.4″N 139°43′30.1″E

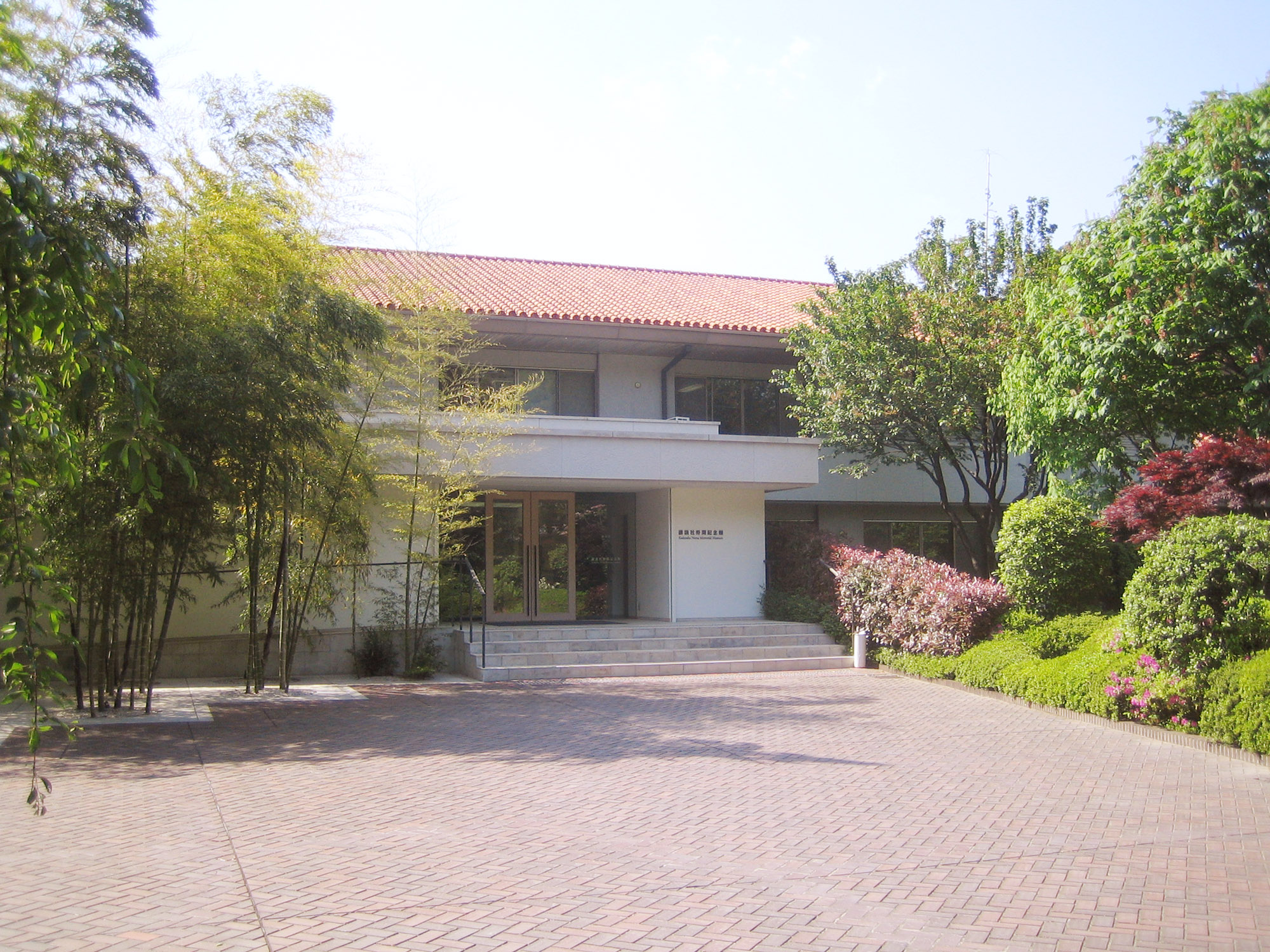
Kodansha Noma Memorial Museum

Kodansha Noma Memorial Museum (講談社野間記念館, Kōdansha noma kinenkan) is located in Bunkyo, Tokyo, Japan. Its collection includes fine Japanese art objects. The museum is currently closed for renovations.

The museum was opened in April 2000, in order to commemorate the 90th anniversary of the founding of Japan's largest publishing company, Kodansha Publishing Company. It was the residence of the former Kodansha president Sawako Noma, the grand daughter of its founder, Seiji Noma. One of the museum's exhibits is the Noma Japanese Art Collection, art objects collected by Seiji Noma in the early part of the 20th century. Featured artists include Kawai Gyokudō, Uemura Shōen, Kiyokata Kaburagi, and more. The Noma collection includes works by Yokoyama Taikan and other modern Japanese and Western artists, sculpture and ceramics. There are also 6,000 shikishi (decorated Japanese paper or silk used originally for artistic prose, etc) received directly from the artists. The collection reflects an overview of the trends in the history of modern Japanese art. The Museum also displays the Publication Culture Collection, which presents valuable cultural treasures that have been collected from the Meiji Era to the Heisei Era.
