= Wakeijuku =

Coordinates: 35°42′51″N 139°43′24″E

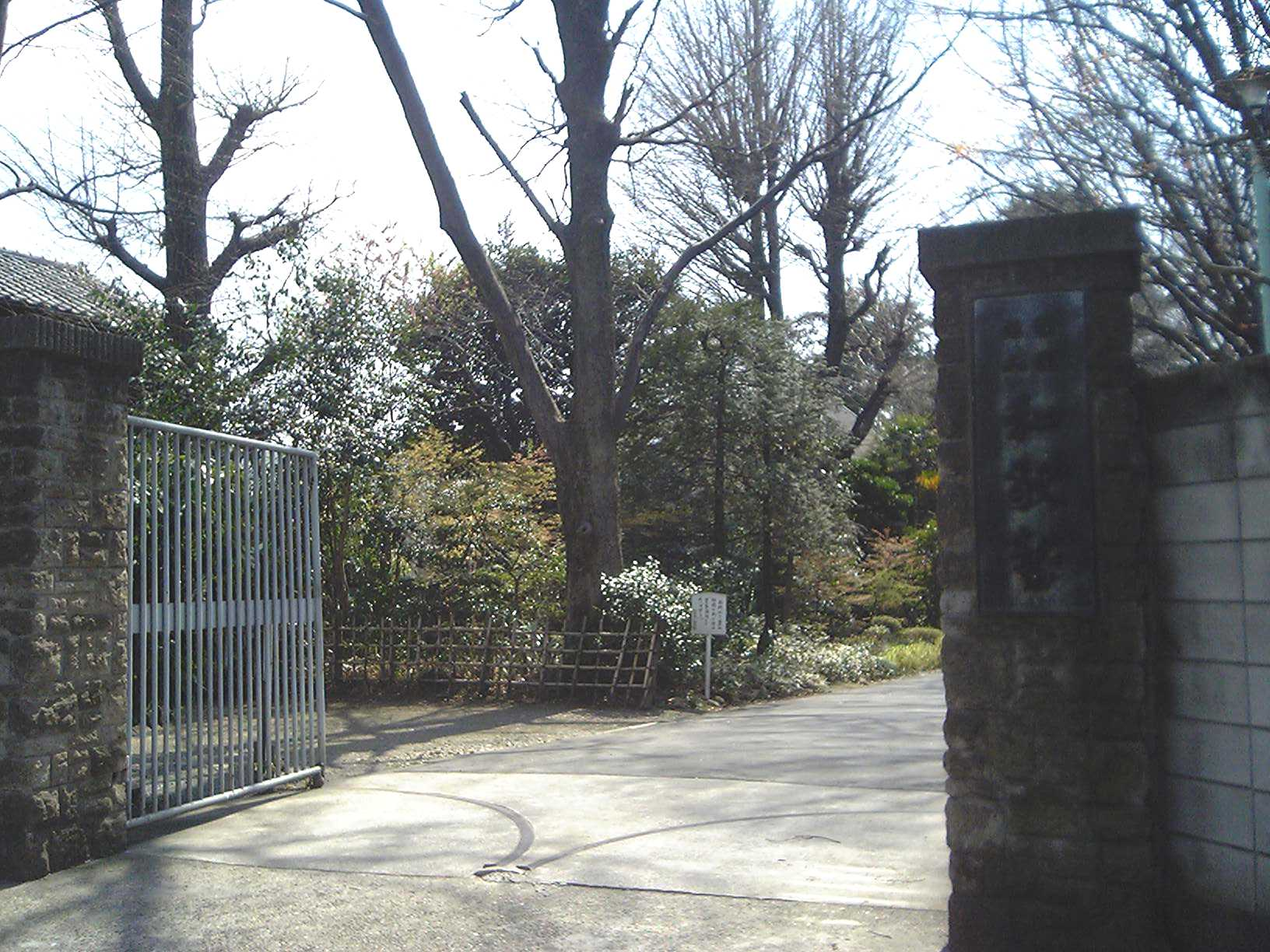
Main Gate, Mejiro

Wakeijuku (和敬塾), literally meaning "a place to seek harmony and respect", is an all-male dormitory located in the Mejirodai neighborhood in the Bunkyō ward of Tokyo, Japan. Established in 1955 by Kisaku Mayekawa, philanthropist and founder of Mayekawa Manufacturing Company, Wakeijuku has been the home of students of Japanese universities for more than sixty years, including nearby Waseda University. Wakeijuku alumni include four former Japanese prime ministers and Japanese author Haruki Murakami.

== Location ==
Wakeijuku is located on the spacious grounds of a former feudal lord's mansion, at a prestigious address in central Tokyo. Residents simultaneously have convenient access to such major centers of Tokyo as Shinjuku, Ikebukuro, Ginza, Shibuya, Takadanobaba, and Yurakucho, while living in a secluded natural setting with gardens and trees. The Wakeijuku grounds also have tennis, basketball, and soccer facilities, and the institution is less than a five-minute walk from two public parks and the nearby Kanda River. The former Foreign Minister of Japan Makiko Tanaka lives next door in a house that belonged to her father, former Japanese Prime Minister Kakuei Tanaka.

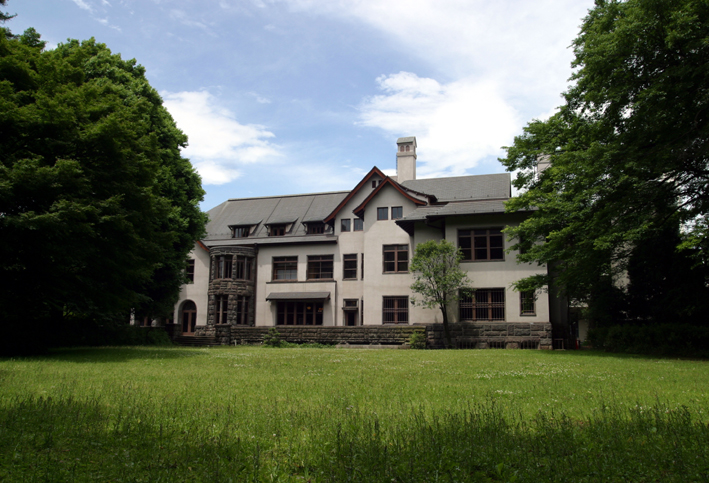
The Mansion of Wakeijuku

== The dormitories ==
Wakeijuku is composed of six dormitories, namely East or Higashi (東), West or Nishi (西), North or Kita (北), South or Minami (南), Tatsumi (巽) which loosely translates as Southeast, and Inui(乾) which loosely translates as Northwest.

Each dormitory has its own traditions, blogs and activities.

== The mansion ==
The most notable landmark on the Wakeijuku grounds is the old Hosokawa Marquis residence called “The Mansion”, built in 1936 by the 16th generation of the Hosokawa House. It is a representative of an official noble residence at the beginning of the Shōwa period. The external facade is based on a British Tudor-style architectural design and the interior is a creative mixture of Japanese, Tudor and Saracen designs. In 1955, the entire Hosokawa residence including the Mansion was purchased to make way for the construction of the Wakeijuku dormitories. The Mansion was kept to preserve the cultural heritage and history of the area. Currently it serves as a venue for symposia, concerts, plays, wedding banquets and art exhibits and serves also as a residence for guests of Wakeijuku. The mansion is also a tourist attraction and has been used as a location for Japanese film and television productions that require Shōwa era or European themed residences.

== Wakeijuku in fiction ==
In the novel Norwegian Wood, written by Haruki Murakami, the main character resides in a dormitory modeled after Wakeijuku and also attends a university modeled similarly to nearby Waseda University.

It also appears in the TV dramas Fugo Keiji, Full Throttle Girl, Engine Sentai Go-onger, Kamen Rider Kabuto, Tokusou Sentai Dekaranger, Kamen Rider Agito, GARO (TV series), and in the manga Zeni Geba, Jin (manga), Deka Wanko, GodHand Teru, Aim for the Ace!, Sailor Moon and Beautiful Bones: Sakurako's Investigation. It also appears in the novel Never Let Me Go (novel).
