= Koishikawa Ukiyo-e Art Museum =

Coordinates: 35°42′32″N 139°45′07″E

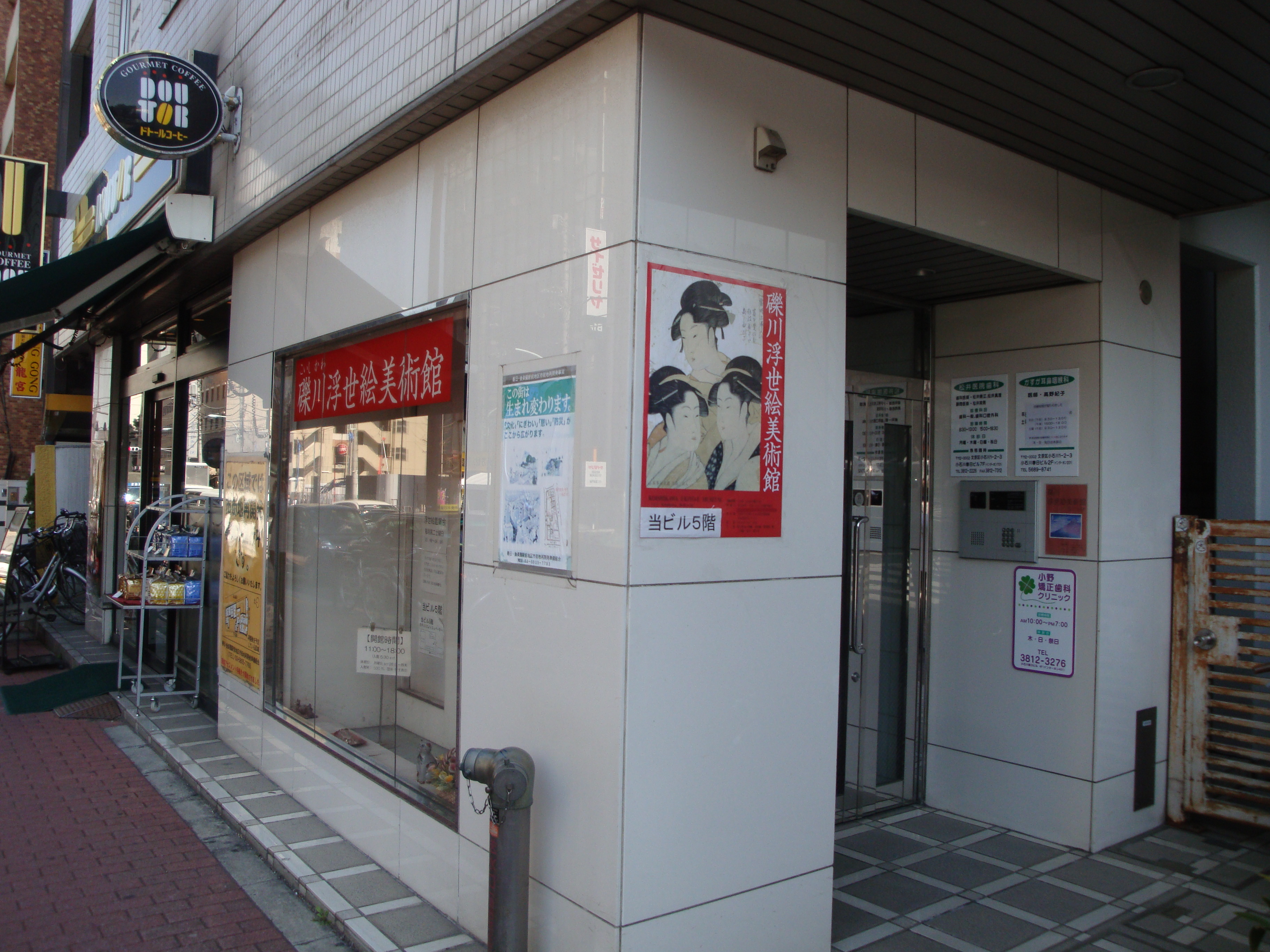
Entrance to the Koishikawa Ukiyo-e Art Museum

Koishikawa Ukiyo-e Art Museum (礫川浮世絵美術館, Koishikawa Ukiyo-e Bijutsukan) is located in Bunkyō, Tokyo, Japan. Its collection includes ukiyo-e genre paintings from the Edo period, in particular, prints by Utamaro, Hokusai and Hiroshige. Every month the museum changes the ukiyo-e exhibition. This small museum was opened in November 1998. Its aim is to promote understanding of ukiyo-e culture.

The museum closed (effectively permanently) in March 2014.
