= Bunkyo Gakuin University =

Coordinates: 35°43′06″N 139°45′26″E

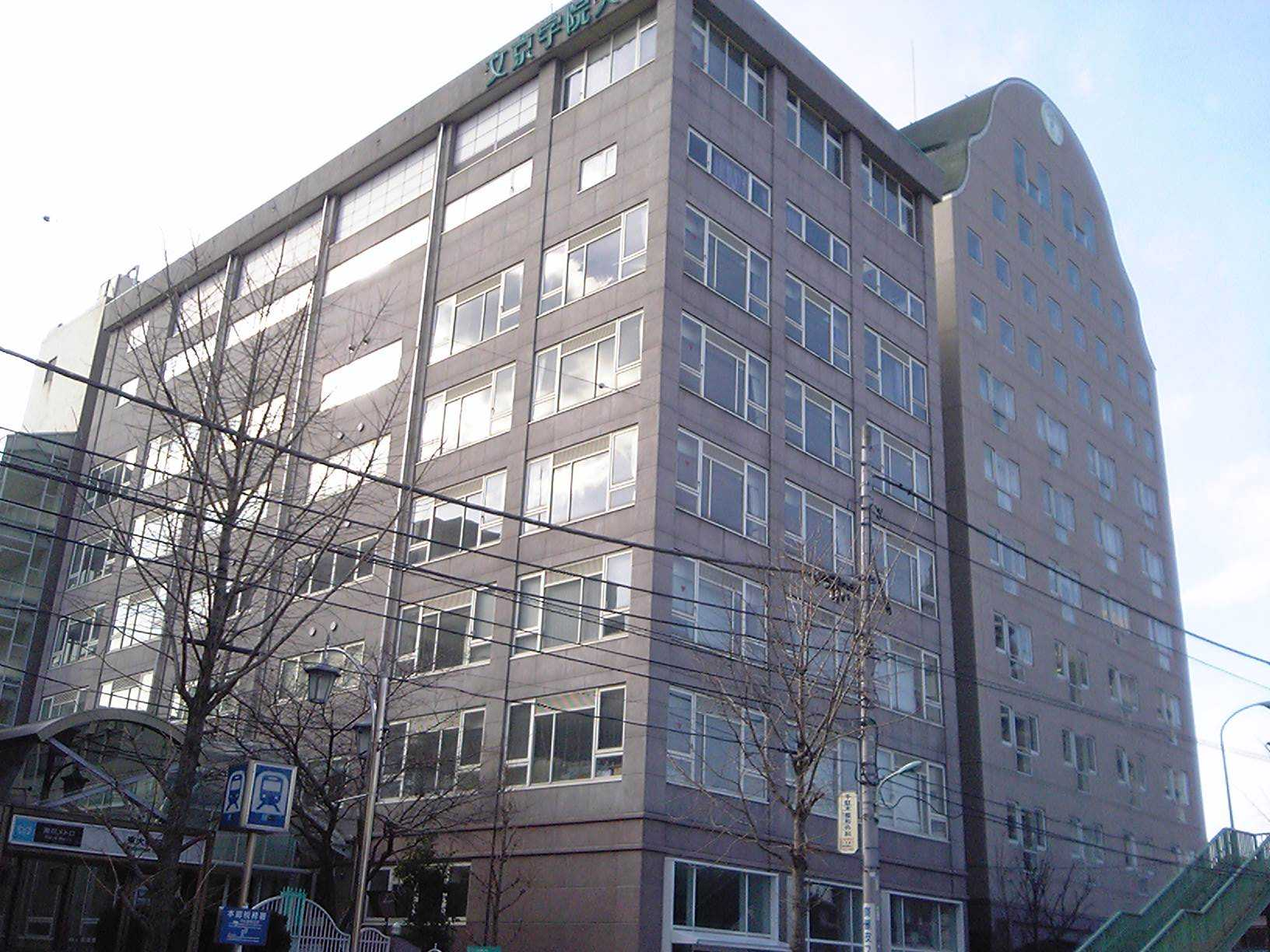
Bunkyo Gakuin University

Bunkyo Gakuin University (文京学院大学, Bunkyō Gakuin Daigaku) is a coeducational instituition located in Bunkyō, Tokyo, Japan, in proximity to the University of Tokyo. Bunkyo Gakuin University was founded by Ishiko Shimada and is operated by the Bunkyo Gakuin Educational Foundation. The university has affiliated institutions, including Bunkyo Gakuin University Girls' Junior and Senior High School. Notably, it was the first women's university in Japan to establish a Faculty of Business Administration.

A second campus is situated northwest of Tokyo in Fujimino, Saitama. Initially named Bunkyo Women's University (文京女子大学), the institution was renamed Bunkyo Gakuin University in 2002 and transitioned to a coeducational system in 2005.

As of April 2022, Akiko Shimada serves as Honorary Chancellor, Masakazu Shimada as Chancellor and Chairman of the Board of Trustees, and Tsutomu Fukui as President.

Bunkyo Gakuin University is distinguished for its Chat Lounge, a facility designed to enhance students' conversational language skills. The Chat Lounge is staffed by chat partners, faculty and staff members from diverse international backgrounds, including the United States, Singapore, Indonesia, France, China, South Africa, and South Korea. The program offers instruction in multiple languages, including English, Chinese, French, Korean, and Spanish. The Chat Lounge operates Monday through Friday during academic semesters.

Bunkyo Gakuin University offers three student dormitories located in Hongo, Nishikata, and Fujimino, along with a dormitory for foreign exchange students near the Hongo campus. Additionally, the university operates a junior and senior girls' high school in Komagome, Tokyo, and a kindergarten across from the Hongo campus.

In October 2024, Bunkyo Gakuin University celebrated its 100th anniversary since establishment.

== Historical Overview and Timeline of Bunkyo Gakuin University ==
- 1924 – Establishment of the Shimada Sewing Training Institute
- 1925 – Renamed Hongo Girls' Academy
- 1964 – Bunkyo Women's Junior College established
- 1969 – Bunkyo Nursery Teacher Training School founded
- 1991 – Faculty of Business Administration established (the first of its kind at a women's university in Japan)
- 1997 – Faculty of Human Studies and Graduate School of Business Administration established
- 1999 – Graduate School of Human Studies established
- 2001 – Faculty of Foreign Languages, Department of English Communication, established
- 2002 – Renamed Bunkyo Gakuin University
- 2005 – Transition to a coeducational system across all faculties; Graduate School of Foreign Languages established
- 2006 (April) – Faculty of Health Science and Technology established, including the Departments of Physical Therapy, Occupational Therapy, and Clinical Laboratory Science
- 2008 (March) – Closure of Bunkyo Gakuin University Medical Technology Vocational School
- 2009 – 85th anniversary of the institution's founding; integration of separate alumni associations into a unified Alumni Association
- 2010 (April) – Graduate School of Health Science established
- 2014
  - April – Department of Nursing established within the Faculty of Health Science and Technology
  - August – Closure of Bunkyo Gakuin Junior College
- 2021 (April) – Graduate School of Nursing, Master's Program in Nursing, established
- 2023 (April) – Department of Marketing and Design established within the Faculty of Business Administration (pending approval at the time of announcement)
- 2024 - Celebrated 100-year Anniversary since establishment.

== Faculties ==
Students may choose from these programs of study:

- Foreign Languages
- Business Management
- Humanities
- Health Care Management (new in 2006)

== Study abroad ==
In 2003, Bunkyo Gakuin University initiated a study abroad exchange program with Saint John's University and the College of Saint Benedict in Minnesota (USA). The following year, the university began hosting students from Malaysia. Since 2006, students from Thompson Rivers University in British Columbia, Canada have participated in the exchange program. Additionally, the university sends its students to various international institutions for study, including Beijing Language University in China, New Zealand, Australia, and starting in 2008, the United Kingdom.

- Bunkyo Gakuin University Website (in English)
