= Tokyo Metropolitan Government Bureau of Waterworks =

Tokyo Metropolitan Government Bureau of Waterworks (東京都水道局, Tōkyōto Suidōkyoku) is the city-owned public corporation that handles Tokyo's water supply.

== Activities ==
- Tap water supply: Production of drinking water with advanced water purification
- Tap water supply for industrial use (water purification without disinfection)

== See also ==
- Tokyo Waterworks Historical Museum
