= Suidō =

Suidō 水道
- District
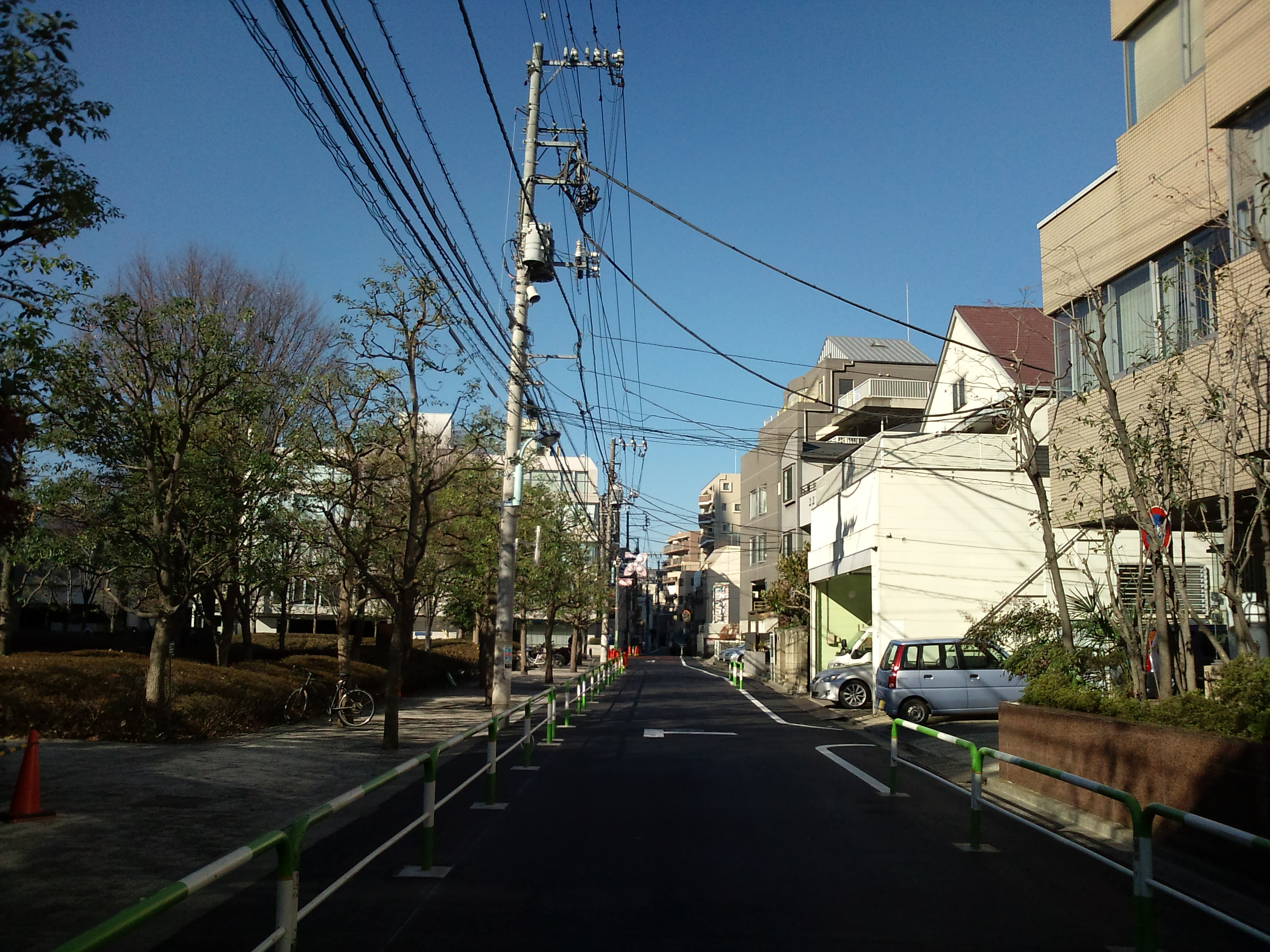

- Location of Suidō within Tokyo
- Coordinates: 35°42′34.41″N 139°44′16.93″E
- Country: Japan
- Region: Kantō
- Prefecture: Tokyo
- Ward: Bunkyō

Area
  - Total: 0.193 km^{2} (0.075 sq mi)

Population (August 1, 2019)
  - Total: 6,548
- Time zone: UTC+9 (JST)
- Zip code: 112-0005
- Area code: 03

Suidō (水道) is a district of Bunkyō, Tokyo, Japan.

== Education ==
Bunkyo Board of Education operates the local public elementary and middle schools.

Zoned elementary schools for parts of Suidō are: Kanatomi (金富小学校) and Kohinatadaimachi (小日向台町小学校).

Zoned junior high schools for parts of Suidō are: No. 3 (第三中学校), Meidai (茗台中学校), and Otowa (音羽中学校).
