= Kisaku Mayekawa =

Japanese businessman

Kisaku Maekawa (前川 喜作, Maekawa Kisaku, 1893–1986) was a Japanese industrialist and philanthropist who founded Mayekawa Manufacturing Company in Tokyo, Japan in 1924. A graduate of Japan's Waseda University, he also founded the all-male Dormitory Wakeijuku through his philanthropic work.

- 1920: Graduated from Waseda University School of Science and Engineering
- 1924: Founded Mayekawa Manufacturing Ltd.
- Supplied imperial Japan with war supplies.
- 1948: Councilor of Waseda University (Later trustee)
- 1955: Established the Wakeijuku Foundation
