= International College for Postgraduate Buddhist Studies =

Coordinates: 35.663811°N 139.742237°E

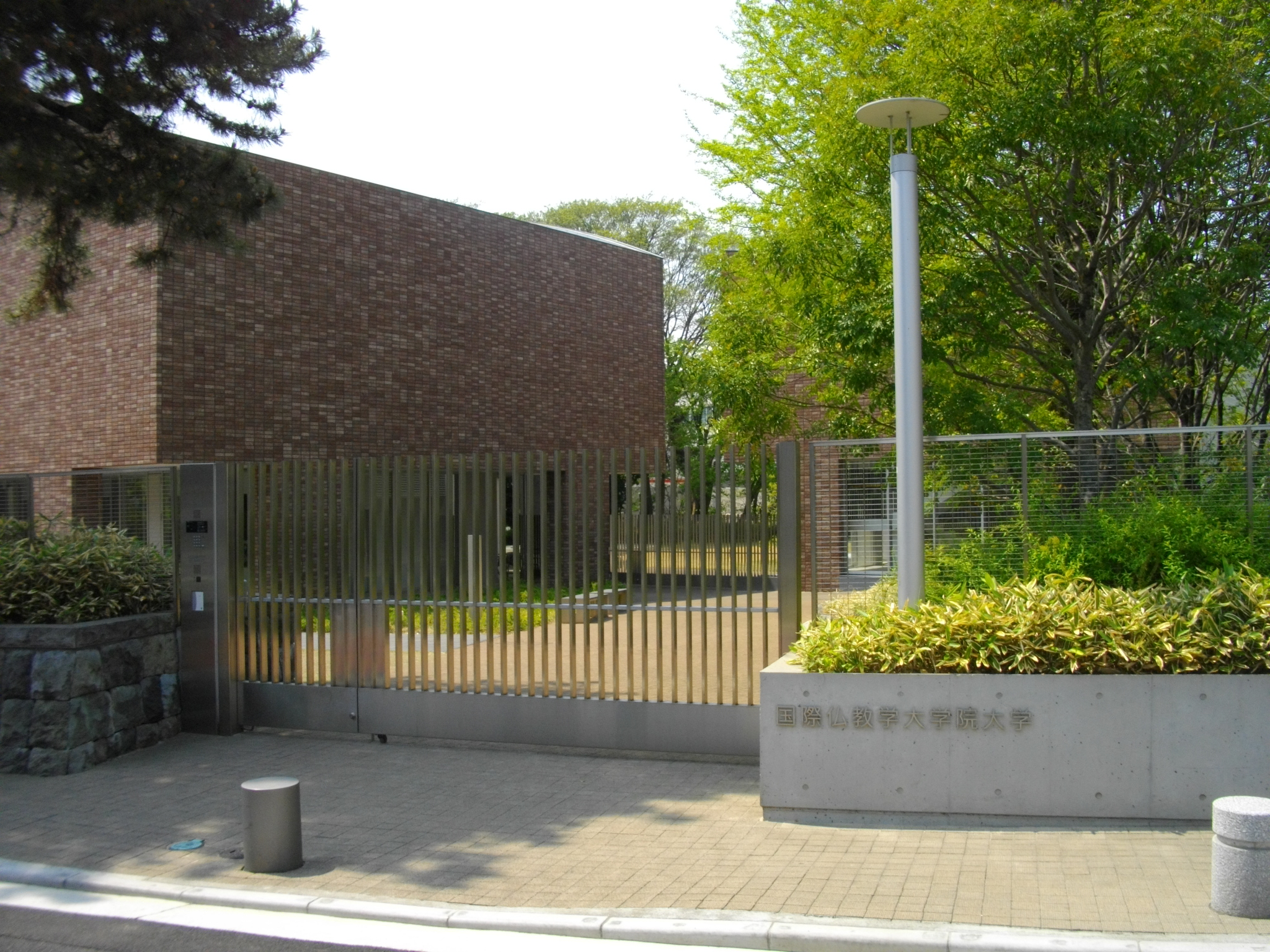
International College for Postgraduate Buddhist Studies

International College for Postgraduate Buddhist Studies (国際仏教学大学院大学, Kokusai bukkyō-gaku daigaku-in daigaku) is a private university (for graduate studies) in Minato, Tokyo, Japan, established in 1995, and formally opened on April 1, 1996. The university offers only one specialized program, a Ph.D. program in Buddhism, and only 20 students are enrolled into the program. This Ph.D. program prepares the Buddhist scholars to work and practice in the international scene with other Buddhists from across the globe. The college is well known throughout the country, and with its high-level of quality education it is amongst the best and most prestigious in Japan, as well as the world.

== Concept ==
The International College for Postgraduate Buddhist Studies provides a singular, highly-intensive, specialized program to its students. The education is highly inclusive, providing classes on a wide array of cultures that have played a key role in Buddhism, its studies, doctrines, practices, and philosophies. The college recognizes the importance that Japan has had in these doctrines throughout the centuries, specifically in their modernization, progressiveness, and internationalization. In order to uphold its scholars to the same standards of quality and excellence that the early Japanese Buddhists established, the college aims to promote the progression of Buddhist studies in the modern age through providing education in the fields of ethics, environmental issues, as well as other religions.

== Curriculum ==
The college offers a 5-year-long doctorate program after which scholars graduate with a Ph.D. in Buddhist Studies. Per academic year, the college only accepts 4 new students. This low enrollment number allows for the college to maintain its 20-person capacity in order to provide the most personalized curriculum for students. Each student is expected to craft a study plan to help them master all the necessary skills they will require in order to successfully complete their dissertation. Additionally, besides a supervisor's guidance, due to the small amount of faculty and staff, students may easily obtain thorough feedback and academic advice from professors and specialists besides their own.

The curriculum is divided in accordance with the four main geographical areas within which Buddhist studies originate: South and Southeast Asia, Inner Asia, East Asia, and Pan-Asian Buddhist Culture. Within this curriculum, classes on the history, philosophy, culture, practice, art, literature, etc., are offered to students. Annually, famous Buddhist scholars visit the institution as guest professors in order to enrich the students and provide opportunity to truly get in touch with the international Buddhist scene.

== Admission requirements ==
The college accepts both Japanese and international students that meet the criteria for a doctoral program in Buddhist studies. The criteria are the following:

1. Basic Knowledge in the Field of Buddhist Study

2. Basic Skills for reading traditional Buddhist sources in classical languages

3. Basic skills for reading secondary sources of Buddhist studies in modern languages
