= Koishikawa-Kōrakuen =

Park in Bunkyo, Tokyo, Japan

Koishikawa Kōrakuen Garden
- Koishikawa Kōrakuen (小石川後楽園)
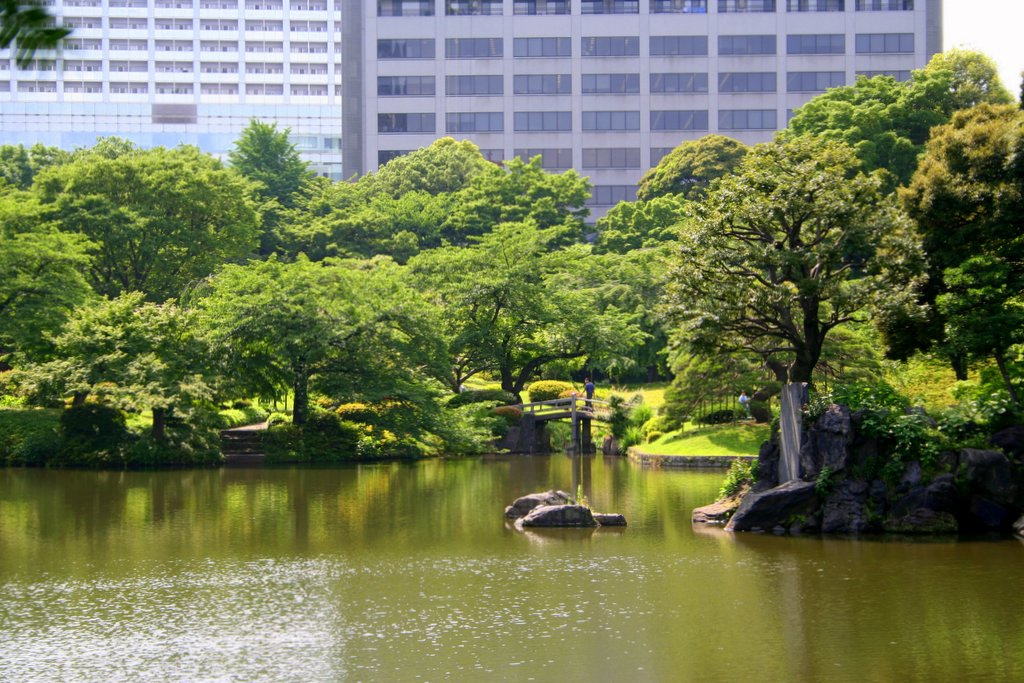
- Pond of Koishikawa-Kōrakuen
- Interactive map of Koishikawa Kōrakuen Garden
- Type: Urban park
- Location: Koishikawa, Bunkyō, Tokyo, Japan
- Coordinates: 35°42′20″N 139°44′57″E
- Opened: 3 April 1938
- Special National Historic Site of Japan Special National Place of Scenic Beauty

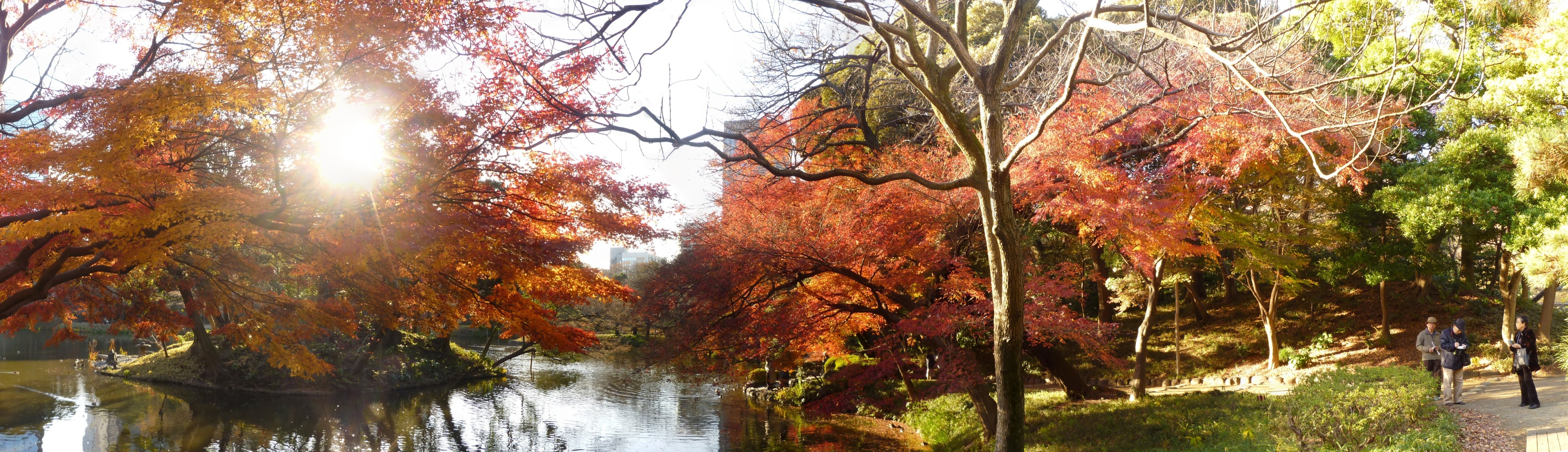
Panorama of fall colors

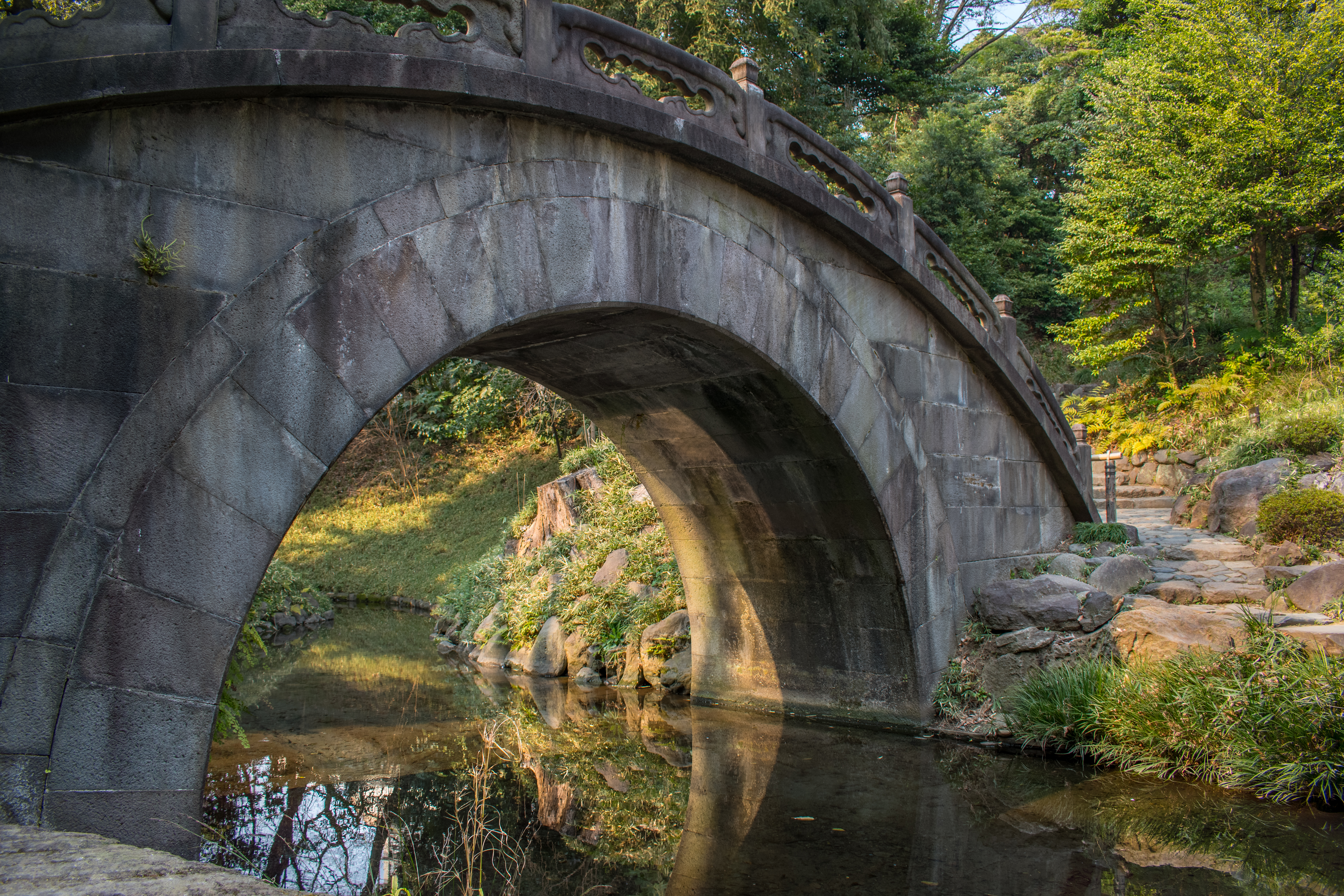
Engetsu-kyō stone bridge

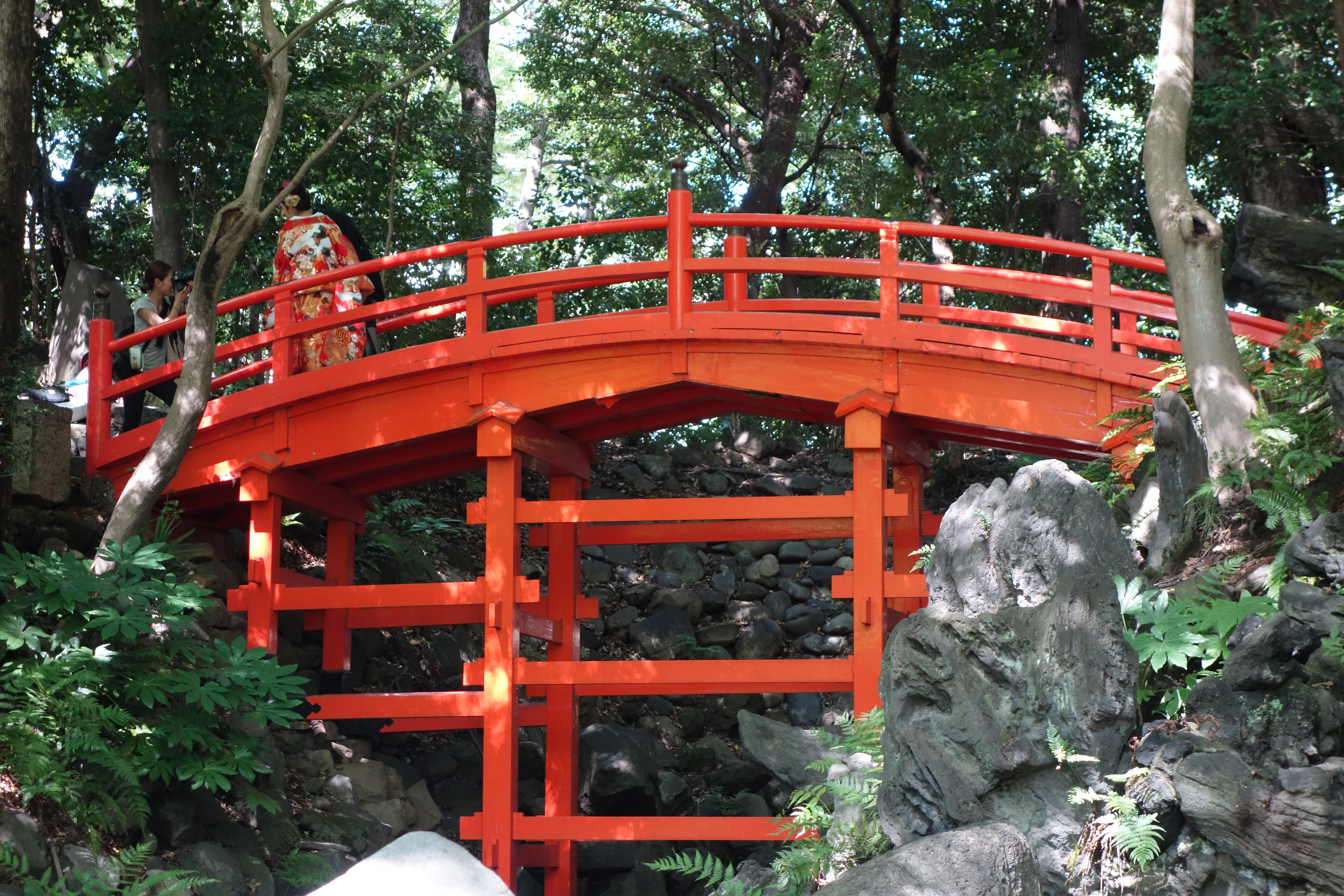
Tsutenkyo bridge

The Koishikawa Kōrakuen (小石川後楽園) is a large urban park in the Koishikawa neighborhood of Bunkyō, Tokyo, Japan. The Japanese garden dates from the early Edo period. and is one of three surviving daimyō gardens of the many that were created during that period, the others being the Rikugi-en and the Hama Rikyū gardens.

== History ==
The Koishikawa-Kōrakuen was constructed in 1629 by Tokugawa Yorifusa, the 11th son of Tokugawa Ieyasu and daimyō of Mito Domain. It was later renovated by his son, Tokugawa Mitsukuni who named it "Korakuen" with the advice of the Ming Confucian scholar Zhu Zhiyu and inspired by descriptions of Yueyang Tower in Chinese literature and poetry. This is the same inspiration for the Kōraku-en garden in Okayama after which the Koishikawa garden is named. The gardens cover an area of more than 70,000 square meters and are planted with plum blossoms, cherry blossoms, azaleas, irises, and other flowering plants, and contain ponds and monumental stones. The gardens were the property of the Mito Tokugawa until 1869, when the final daimyō of Mito, Tokugawa Akitake surrendered the property, together with his mansion, to the new Meiji government. The new government assigned the property to the Ministry of the Army, who constructed an artillery factory on a portion of its grounds. However, much of the garden was preserved, and Emperor Meiji and other high officials used the garden as a reception area for foreign dignitaries.

In 1923, it was designated as a National Historic Site and also as a Place of Scenic Beauty with the designations promoted to "Special National Historic Site" and "Special Place of Scenic Beauty in 1952". It was also renamed Koishikawa Kōrakuen to distinguish it from the Okayama Kōrakuen the same year.

A baseball stadium was constructed in 1937 on the site of the former Tokyo Artillery Factory for the main purpose of professional baseball, and was the main baseball stadium in Tokyo until the construction of the Tokyo Dome. An amusement park (Korakuen Yuenchi) and a multipurpose hall (Korakuen Hall) were also constructed within the grounds.

== Gallery ==
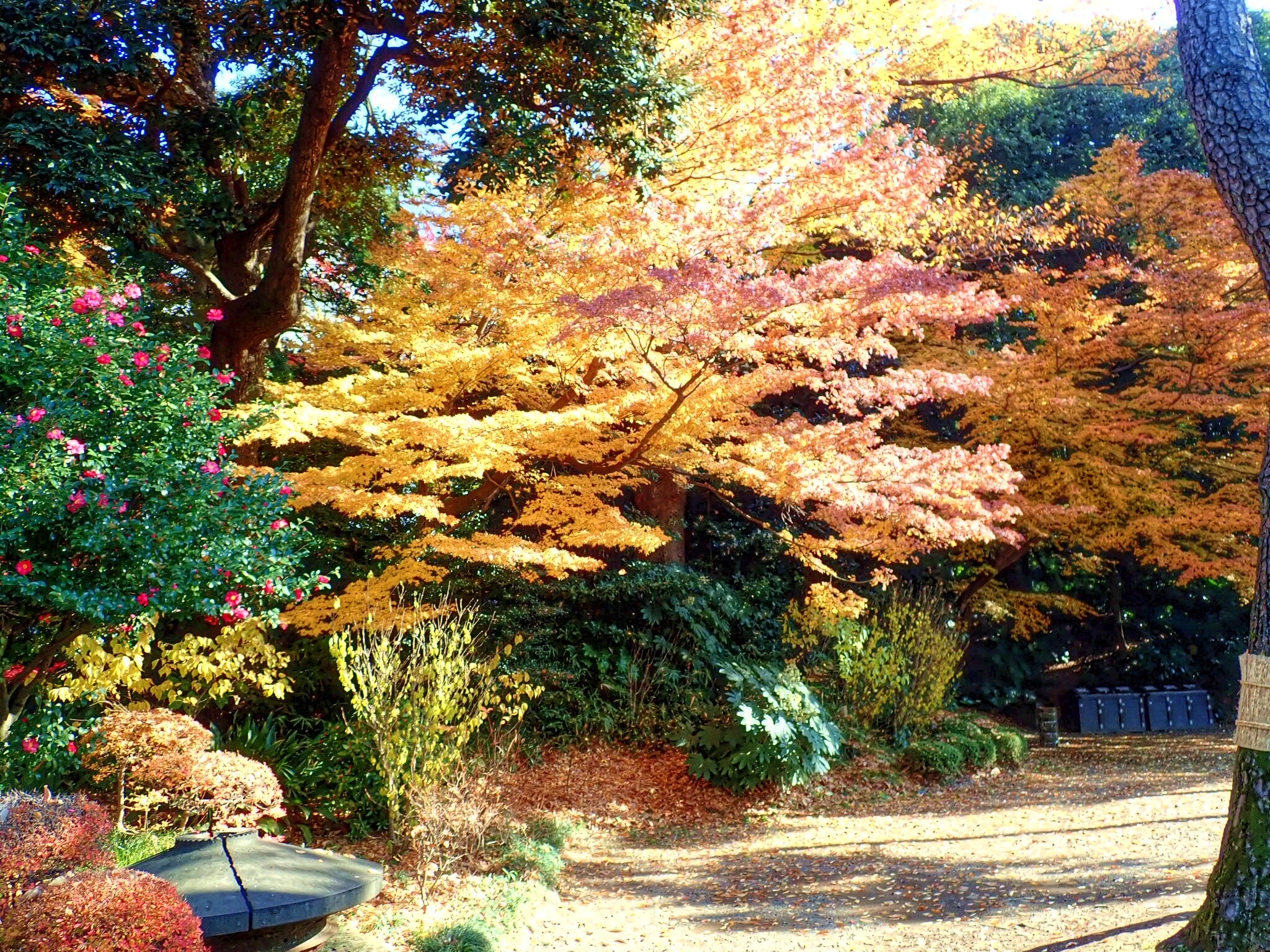
Autumn colours of leaves at Koishikawa-Kōrakuen

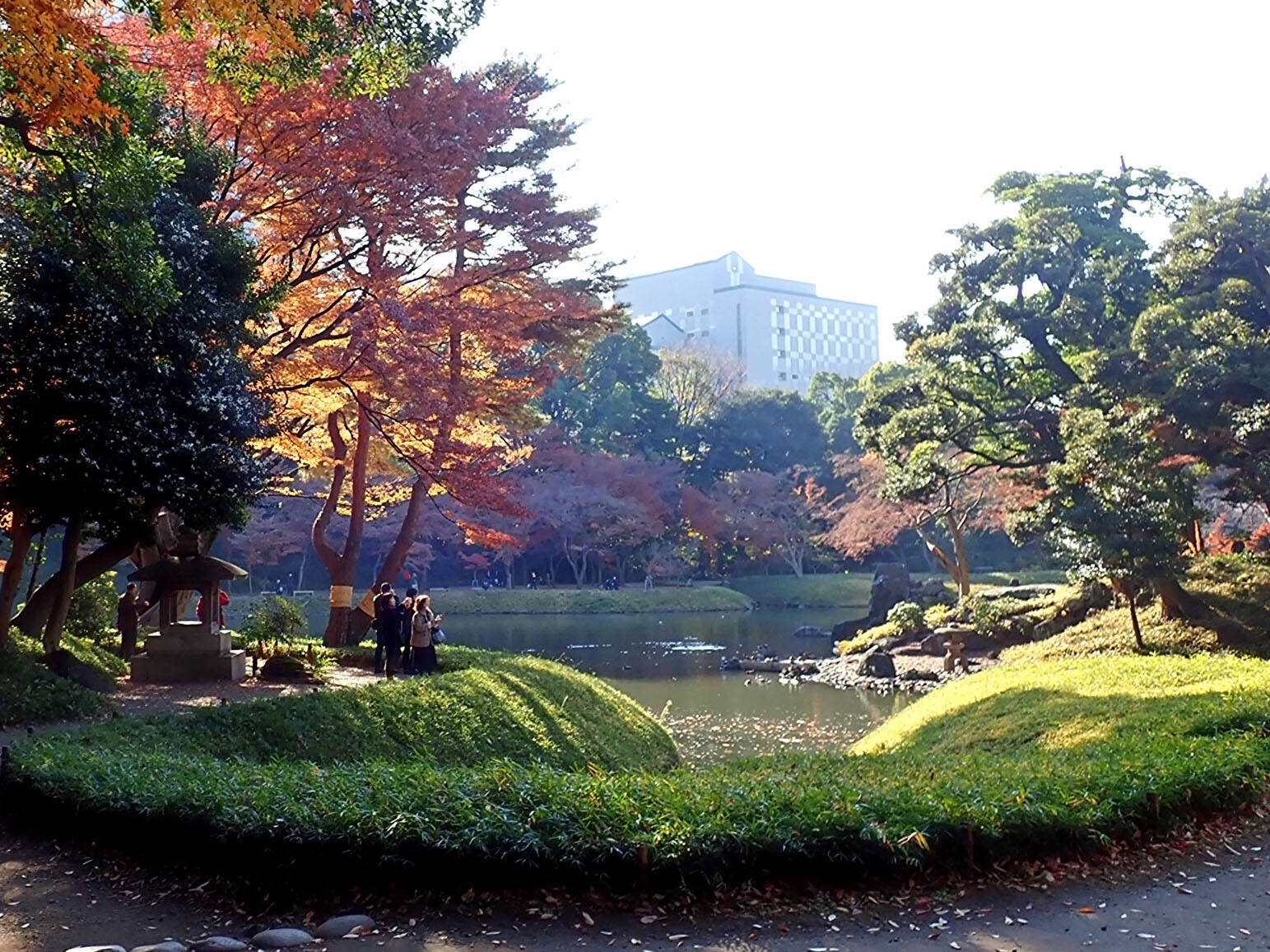
Autumn colours of Daisensui (big pond)

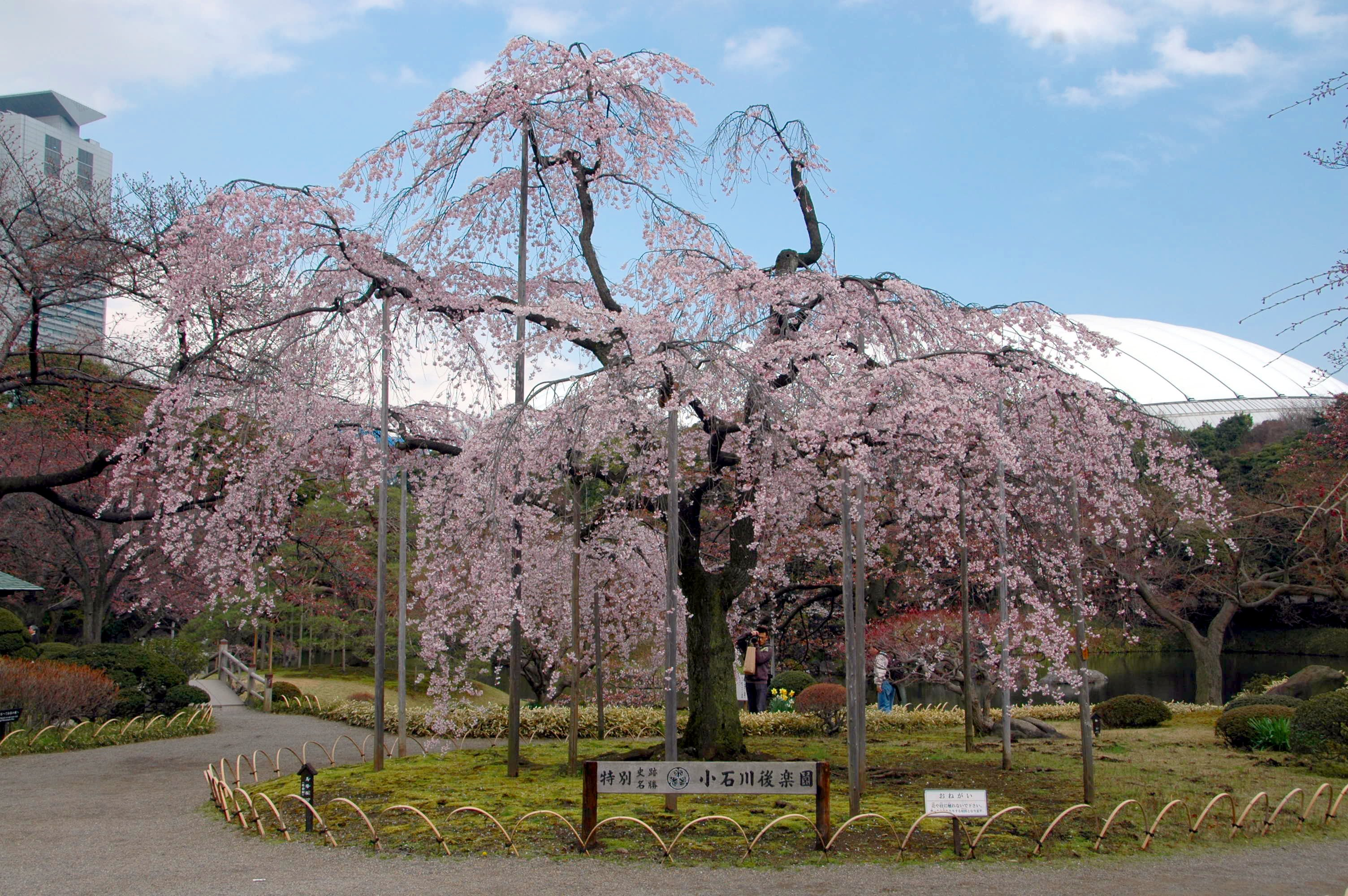
Spring in the park

Scenes from inside the park, 2021

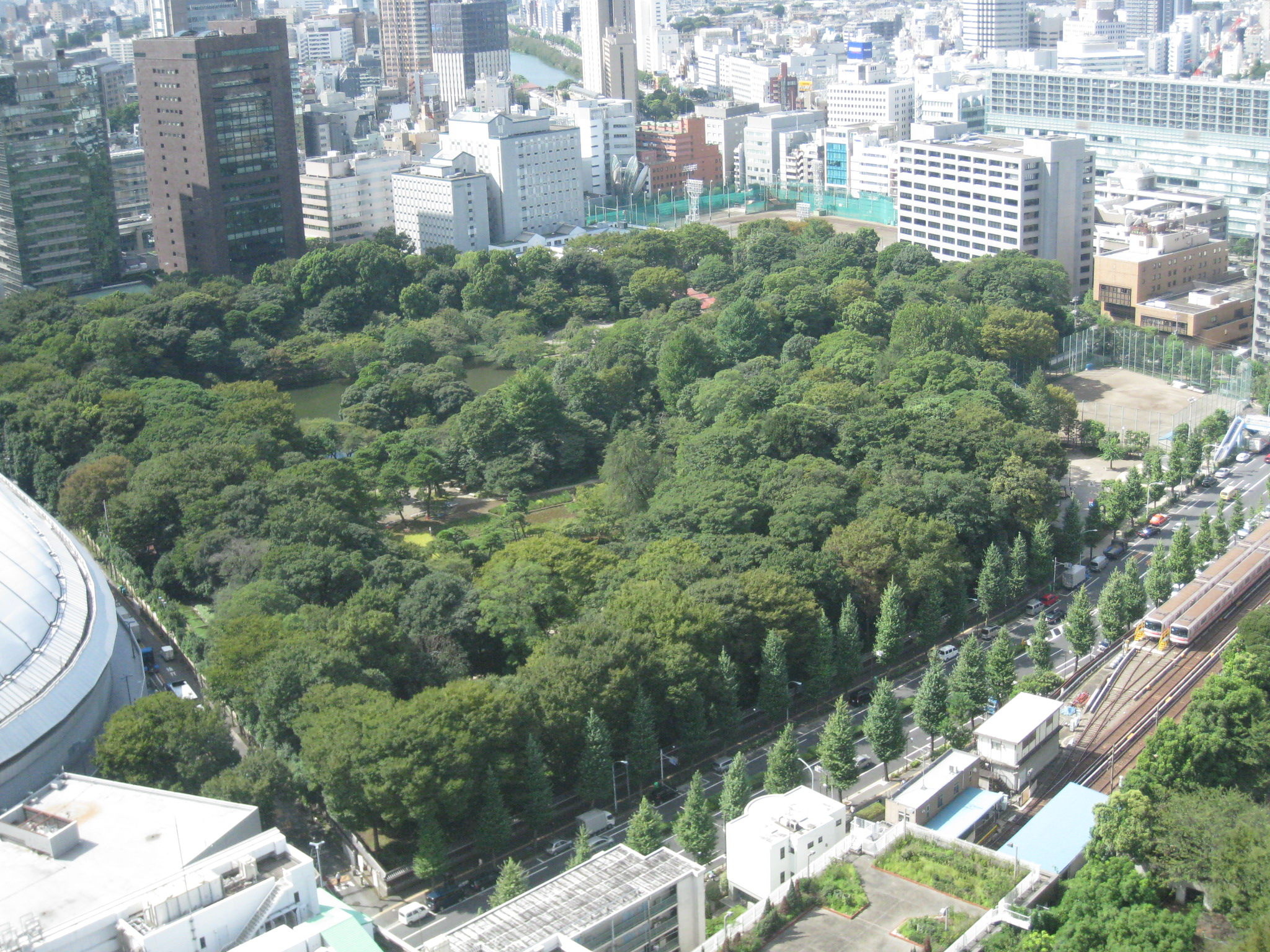

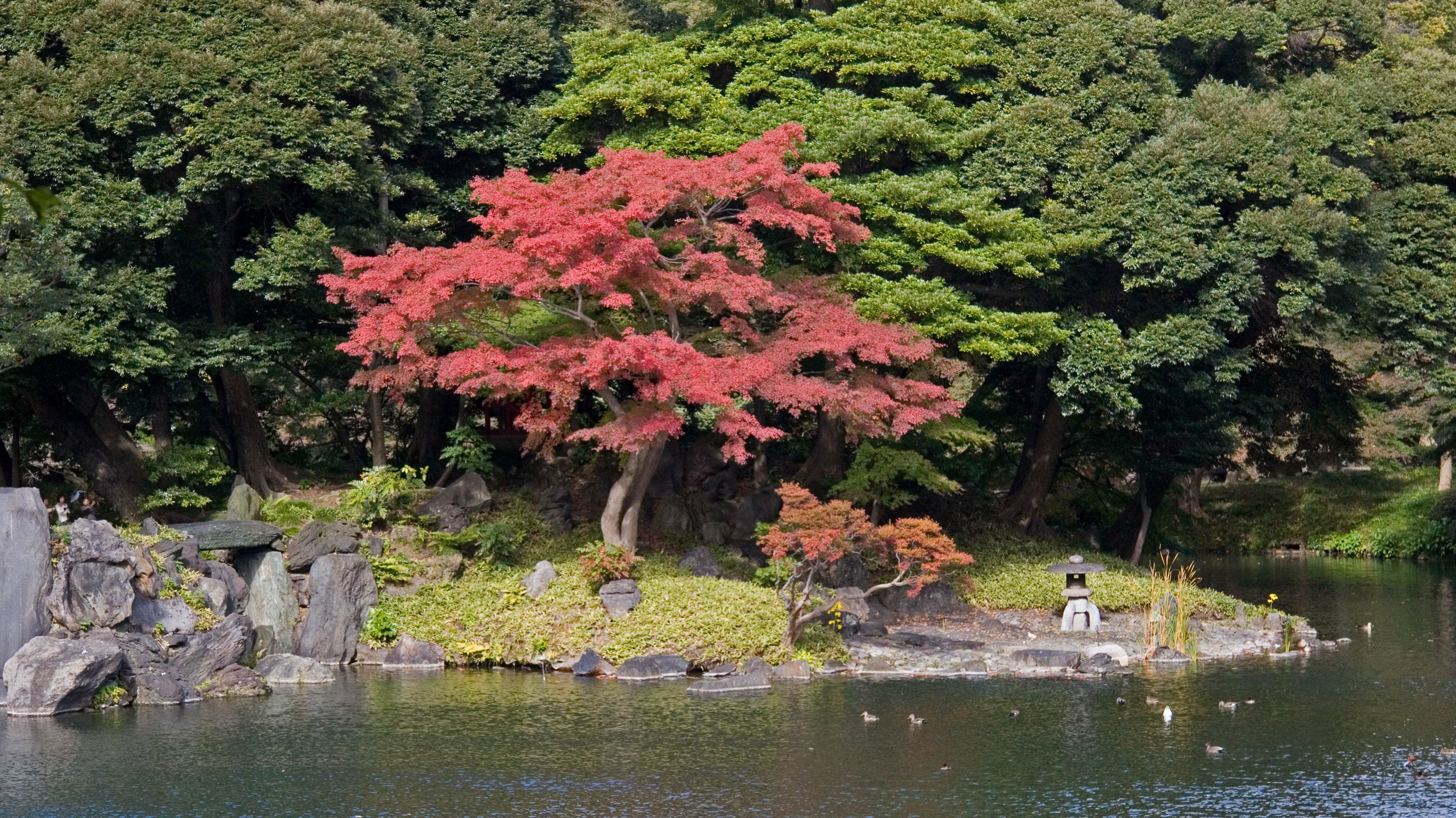

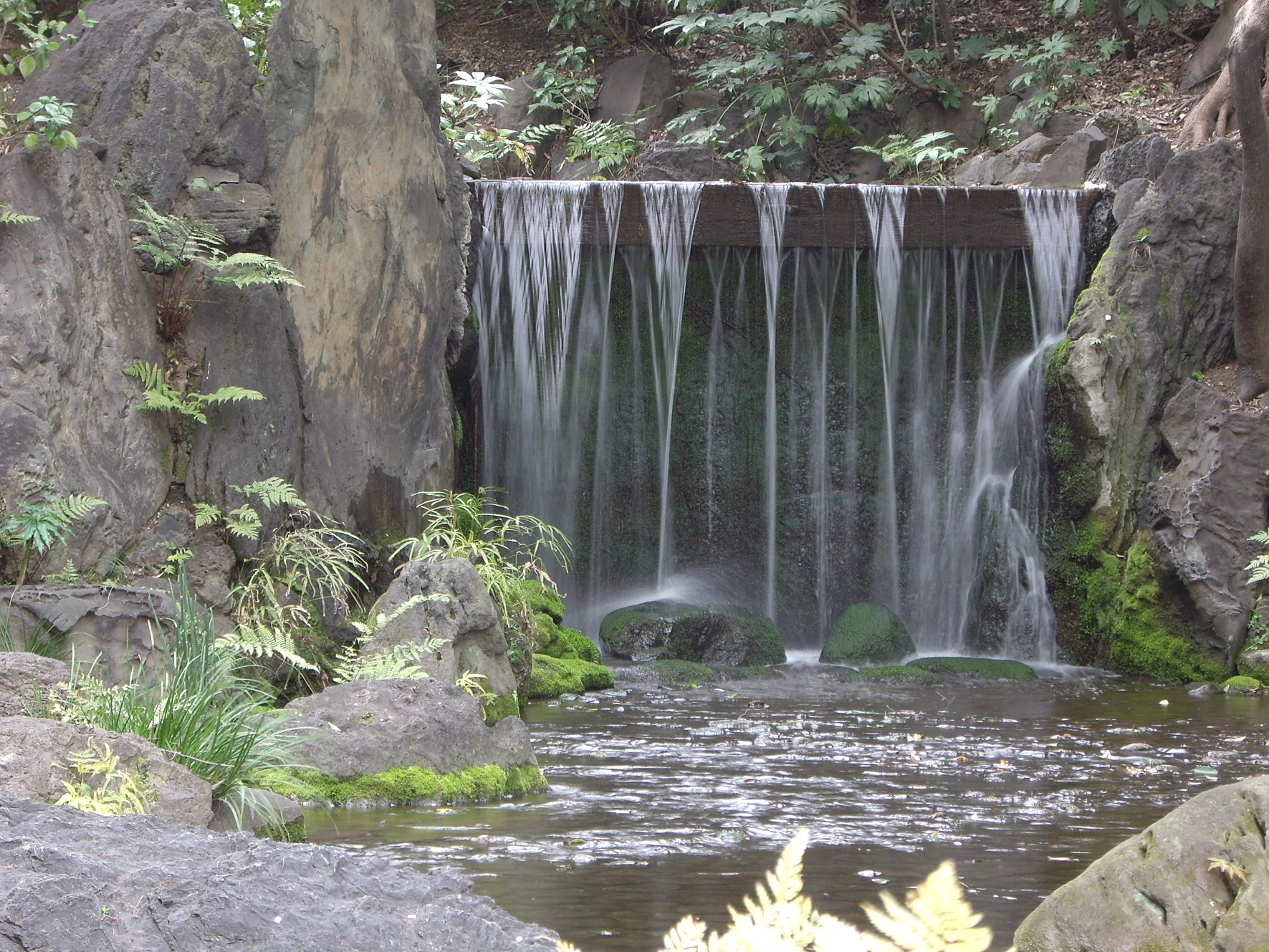

== See also ==
- List of Special Places of Scenic Beauty, Special Historic Sites and Special Natural Monuments
- List of Historic Sites of Japan (Tōkyō)
