= Tokyo Waterworks Historical Museum =

Museum in Bunkyō, Japan

- 東京都水道歴史館
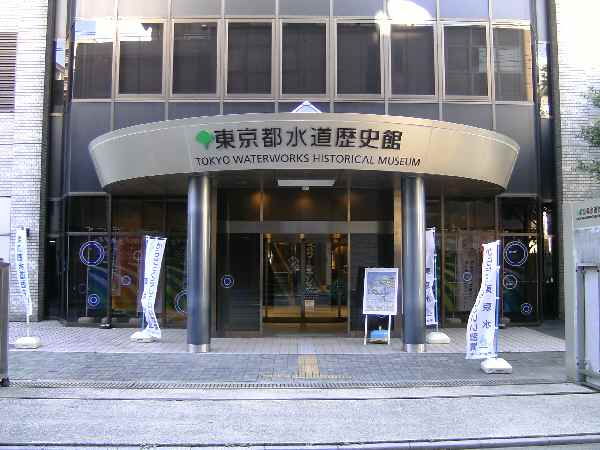
- Museum entrance
- Established: 15 April 1995; 31 years ago
- Location: Hongō, Bunkyō, Tokyo, Japan
- Coordinates: 35.7034°N 139.7605°E
- Owner: Tokyo Metropolitan Government Bureau of Waterworks
- Website: Official website

The Tokyo Waterworks Historical Museum (東京都水道歴史館, Tōkyōto suidō rekishikan) is a public museum in Tokyo, Japan. It is the history museum for the development of the freshwater supply and distribution in Tokyo. The museum was opened on 15 April 1995. The museum consists of two exhibition floors and a library on the third floor. It is located in Hongō next to the Hongō Water Supply Station Park. Admission is free.

== Exhibition ==
The museum has two exhibition floors. The second floor gives an overview of the construction of canals to supply the city with fresh water in the Edo period. Several old wood water pipes are on display. The first floor shows the modernization of the water system in the Meiji period and 20th century. The exhibition is in Japanese, but audio guides are available in English free of charge.

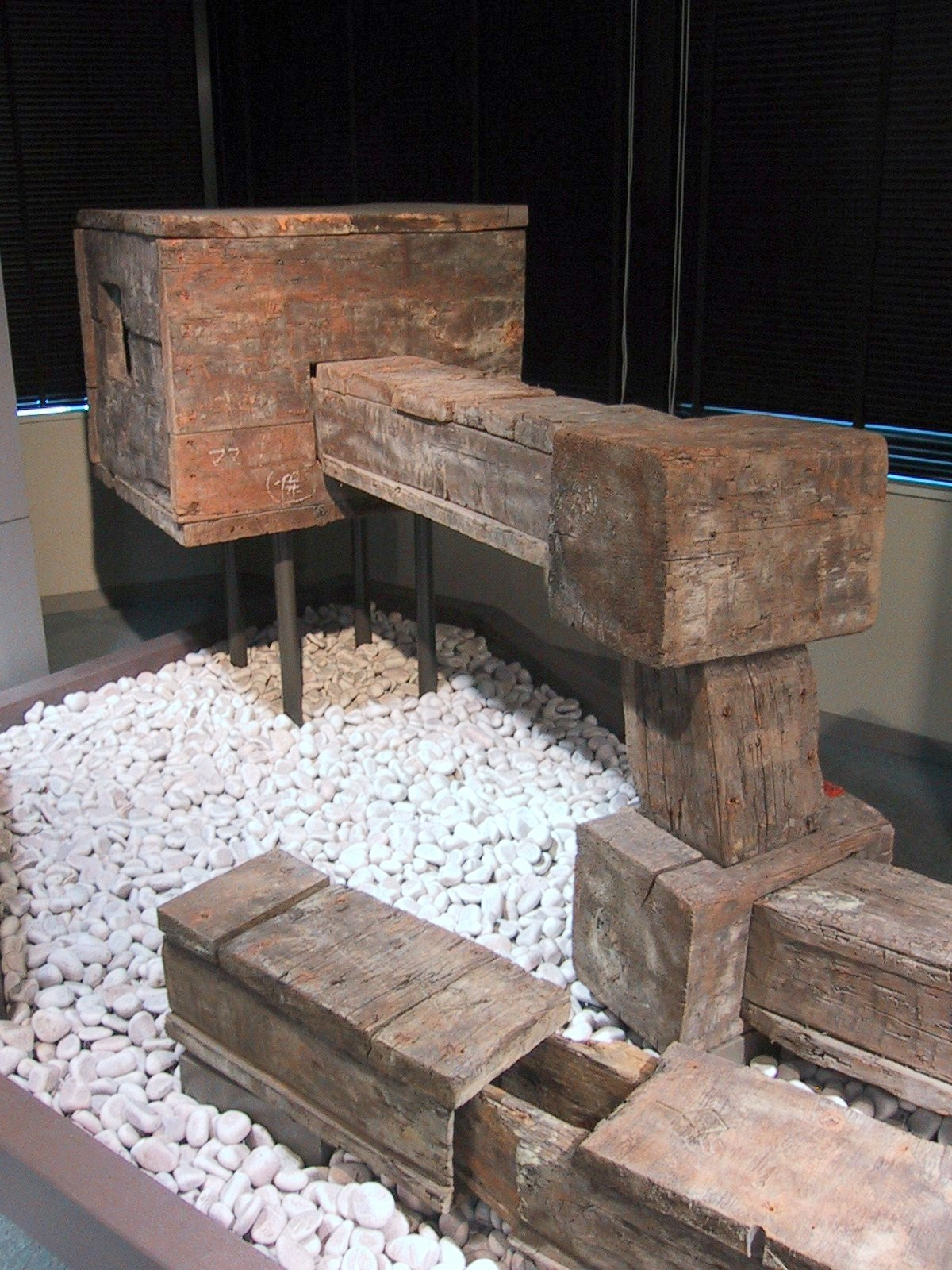
Old water pipes

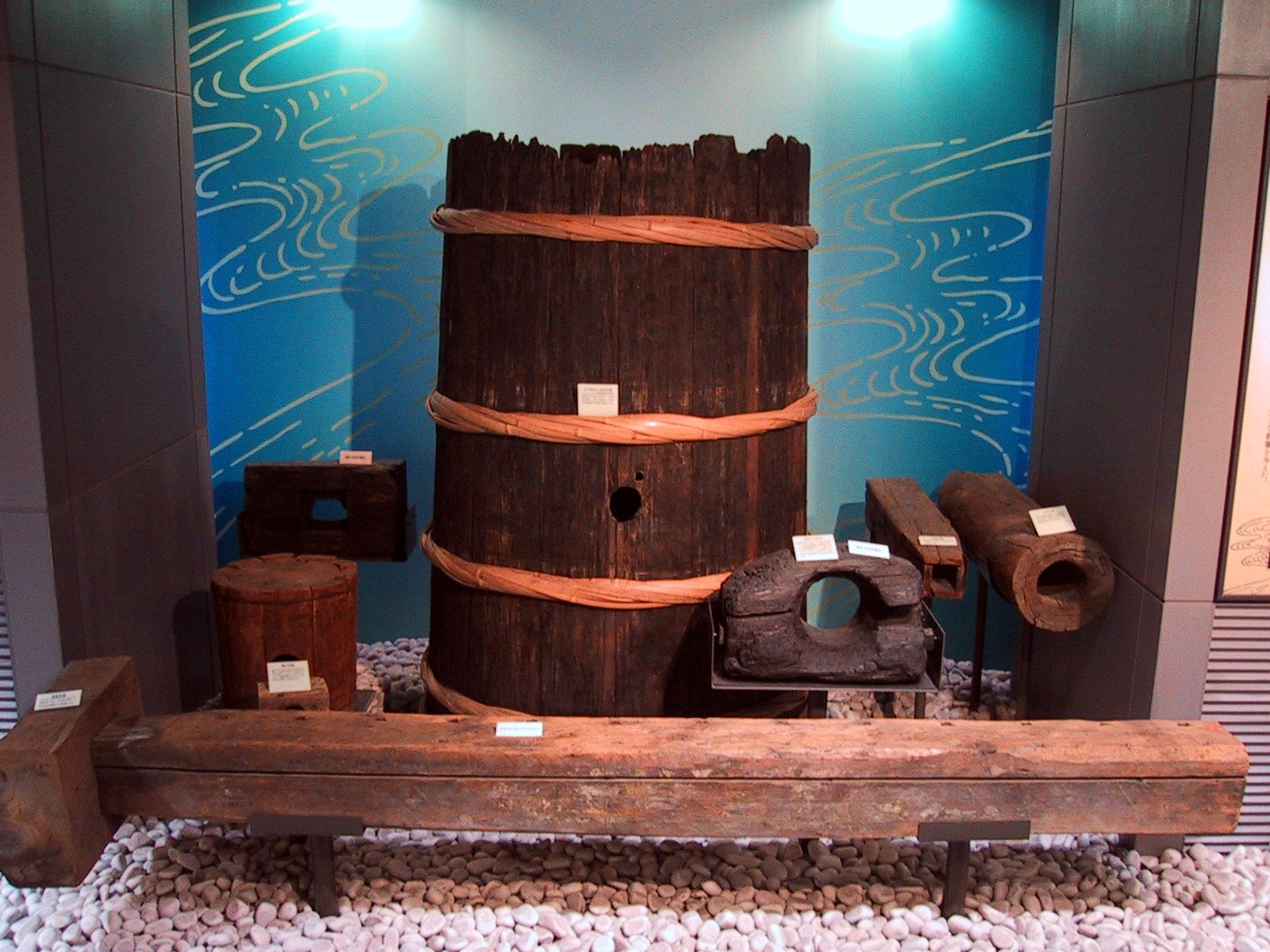
Old well

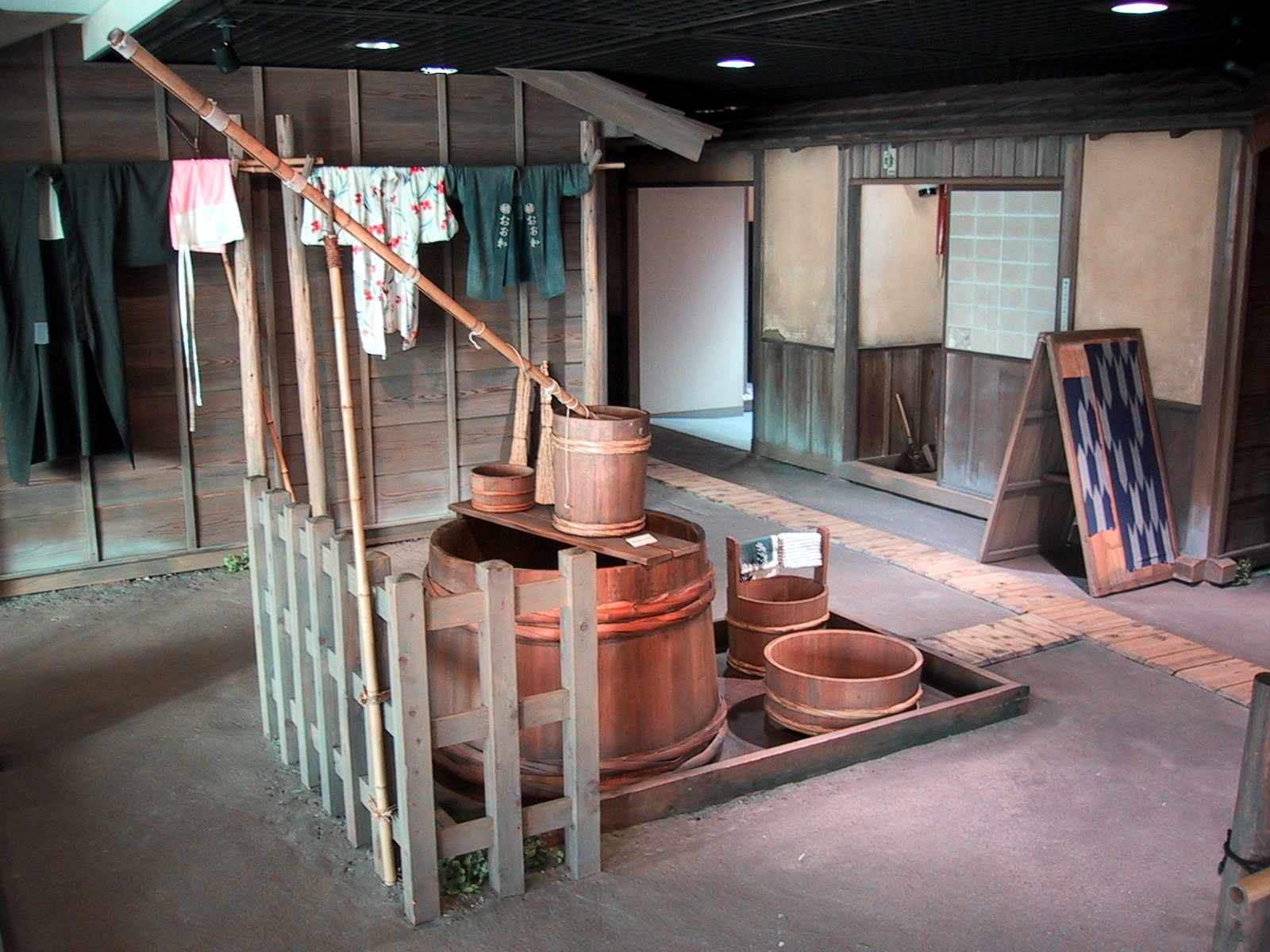
Replica of an Edo period well

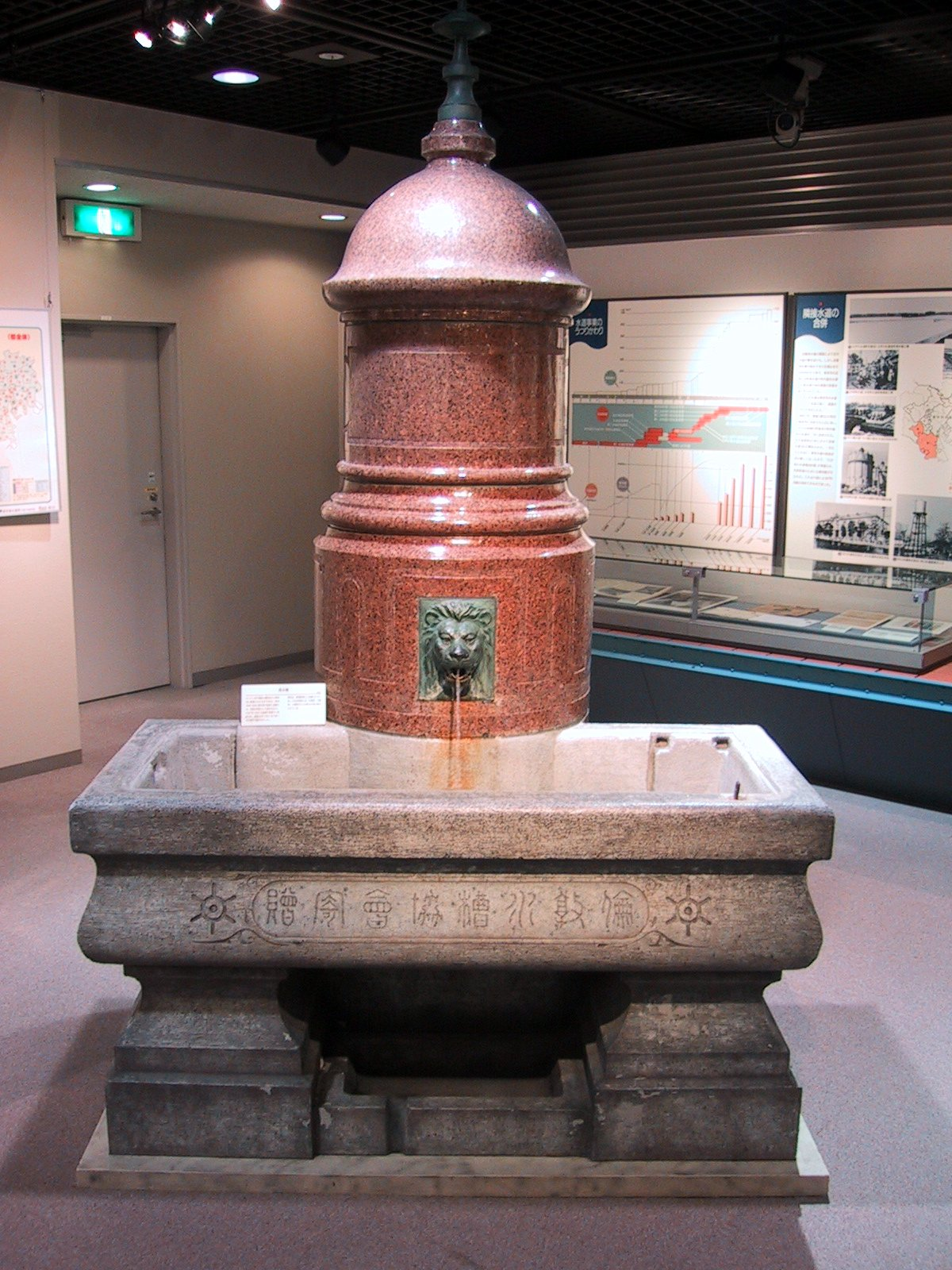
Water fountain in Tokyo
