= Sawako Noma =

Japanese publisher

6th President of Kodansha
- In office 1987 – 30 March 2011
- Preceded by: Koremichi Noma
- Succeeded by: Yoshinobu Noma

Personal details
- Born: 27 July 1943 Tokyo, Japan
- Died: 30 March 2011 (aged 67) Tokyo, Japan
- Spouse: Koremichi Noma
- Parent: Shoichi Noma (father)
- Relatives: Korechika Anami (father-in-law)
- Education: Seisen University (dropped out)
- Occupation: Publisher

Sawako Noma (Japanese: 野間 佐和子, Hepburn: Noma Sawako; 27 July 1943 – 30 March 2011) was a Japanese publisher who was president of Kodansha from 1987 until her death in 2011.

== Biography ==
Sawako Noma was born on 27 July 1943 in Tokyo. Her father Shoichi Noma was the fourth president of Kodansha. She dropped out of Seisen University to marry Koremichi Noma in 1965; Noma was a son of war minister Korechika Anami and would later become the fifth president of Kodansha.

In 1987, following her husband's death, Noma became the sixth president of Kodansha. She had originally worked as a housewife, and this was her first experience as a businesswoman. By 1990, annual profits of ¥152 billion made Kodansha the largest Japanese company headed by a woman president, which at the time was a rarity at only 4%. In 1996, she became president of the company's English-language division Kodansha International.

Noma was an advocate for promoting literacy, chairing the Japan Council for Promotion of Book Reading. She was part of the National Visiting Storytelling Team initiative, where a van with pictures would tour around thd country for visits to daycare centers and kindergartens. In 1992, she presented Timothy S. Healy with a $1.3 million grant to the New York Public Library, specifically its Asian collections, and Asian lecture series, and the Shoichi Noma Reading Room. She was also chair of the International Culture Forum, Japan Magazine Advertising, and Japan Publishing Club.

In 1996, Noma won the Japan Advertising Awards Shōriki Award. She appeared at least three times in Fortune's 50 Most Powerful Women in Business global list in the 2000s.

Noma died of heart failure on 30 March 2011 at a Tokyo hospital, aged 67. In addition to a private family funeral, a public funeral was held at Imperial Hotel, Tokyo on 16 May; over four thousand people attended, including Toppan chief executive Naoki Adachi and novelist Yumie Hiraiwa. She was succeeded as president by her first-born son Yoshinobu Noma.
