= Yayoi, Tokyo =

Coordinates: 35°43′12″N 139°45′35″E

Yayoi (弥生) is a neighbourhood in Bunkyo, Tokyo. In 1884, when it was part of Tokyo City, it was the location of a shell mound where a new type of pottery was discovered by Shogoro Tsuboi and his colleagues. The pottery became known as Yayoi, and eventually a period of Japanese prehistory was named after the neighborhood where the type site was excavated.

Its population, not including non-Japanese residents, is 1,908. (Bunkyō City Hall statistics:)

== Education ==
Bunkyo Board of Education operates the local public elementary and middle schools.

All of Yayoi (1 and 2-chome) is zoned to Nezu Elementary School (根津小学校), and No. 8 Junior High School (第八中学校).
