= University of Tokyo =

Public research university in Japan

- 東京大学
- Seal of the University of Tokyo
- Other name: UTokyo
- Former names: Imperial University; Tokyo Imperial University
- Type: Public research university
- Established: April 12, 1877 (149 years ago)
- Academic affiliations: IARU; AEARU; AGS; BESETOHA; AALAU
- Budget: ¥280 billion (US$2.54 billion) (2021)
- President: Teruo Fujii
- Faculty: 6,311 (3,937 full-time / 2,374 part-time) (2022)
- Total staff: 11,487
- Students: 28,133 (2022) excluding research students and auditors
- Undergraduates: 13,962 (2022)
- Postgraduates: 14,171 (2022) including professional degree courses
- Location: 7 Chome-3-1 Hongo, Bunkyō, Tokyo, 113-8654, Japan; 35°42′48″N 139°45′44″E
- Campus: Urban (Hongo, Komaba) Suburban (Kashiwa)
- Language: Japanese; English (for certain courses)
- Colours: Tansei (UTokyo Blue)
- Website: u-tokyo.ac.jp/en/

The University of Tokyo (東京大学, Tōkyō daigaku, abbreviated as Tōdai (東大) in Japanese and UTokyo in English) is a public research university in Bunkyō, Tokyo, Japan. Founded in 1877 as the nation's first modern university by the merger of several pre-westernisation era institutions, its direct precursors include the Tenmongata, founded in 1684, and the Shōheizaka Institute.

The university consists of 10 faculties, 15 graduate schools, and 11 affiliated research institutes. As of 2023, it has 13,974 undergraduate students and 14,258 graduate students. The majority of the university's educational and research facilities are concentrated within its three main Tokyo campuses: Hongō, Komaba, and Kashiwa. Additionally, UTokyo operates several smaller campuses in the Greater Tokyo Area and over 60 facilities across Japan and globally. UTokyo's land holdings amount to 326 square kilometres (approximately 80,586 acres or 32,600 hectares), placing it amongst the largest landowners in the country.

As of 2025, UTokyo's alumni and faculty include 17 prime ministers of Japan, 22 Nobel Prize laureates, seven astronauts, and a Fields Medalist. Additionally, UTokyo alumni have founded some of Japan's largest companies, such as Toyota and Hitachi. UTokyo alumni also held chief executive positions in approximately a quarter of the Nikkei 225 companies in 2014, a fifth of the total seats in the National Diet in 2023, two-thirds of the prefectural governorships in 2023, and two-thirds of the justiceships at the Supreme Court of Japan in 2024.

== History ==
=== Origins ===
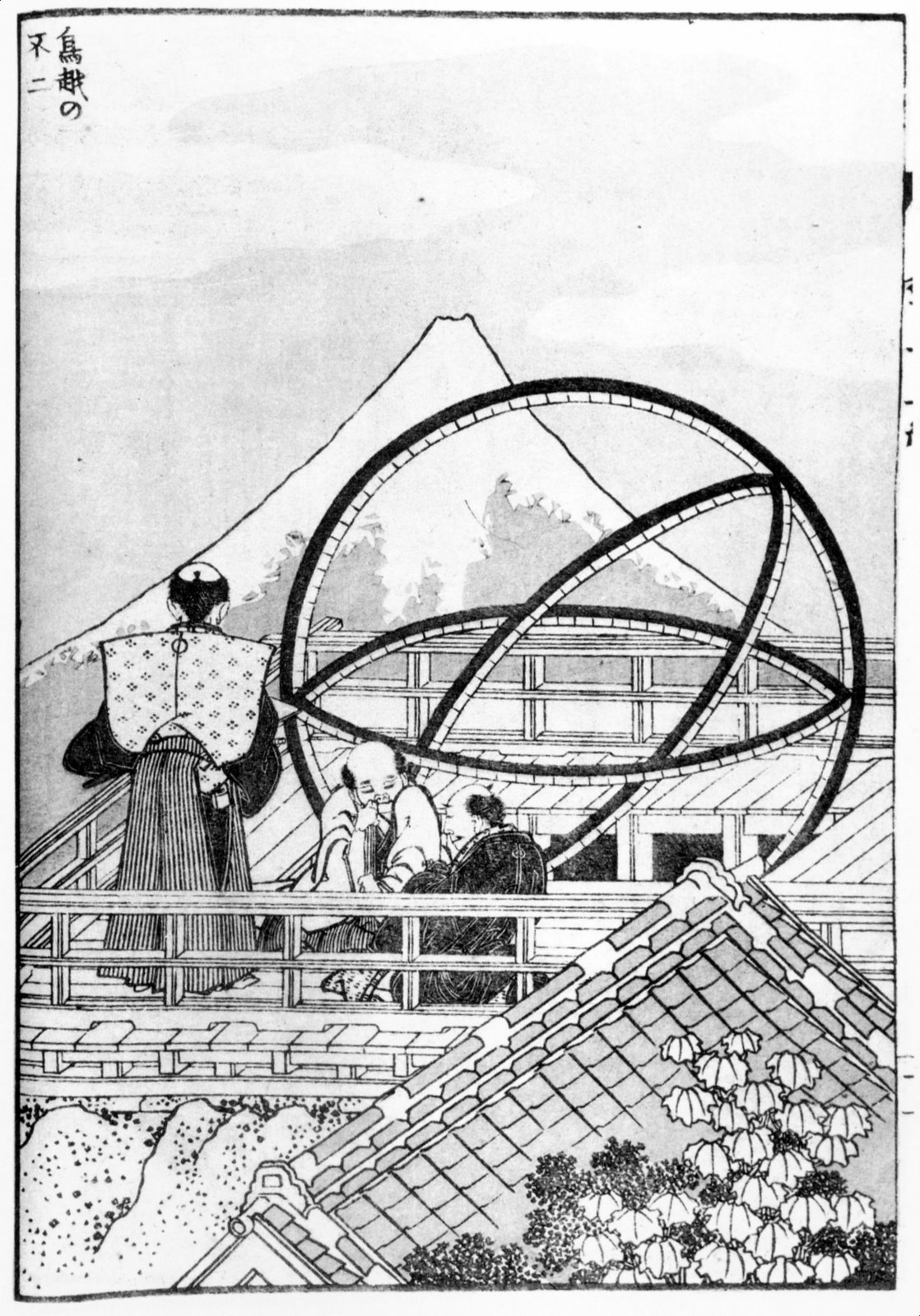
Asakusa Observatory of the Tenmongata by Hokusai

The University of Tokyo traces its roots to three independent institutes founded during the Edo period (1603–1868). The oldest, a Shogun-funded Confucian school called Senseiden (先聖殿), was founded in 1630 by Razan Hayashi in Ueno. This school was renamed the Shoheizaka Institute (昌平坂学問所, Shoheizaka Gakumonjo) and came to be operated directly by the Tokugawa Shogunate in 1791 as part of the Kansei Reforms. The Tenmongata, founded in 1684, was the astronomical research and education arm of the Shogunate. It evolved into the Kaisei School (開成学校), a school for Western learnings, after the Meiji Restoration. The Kanda Otamagaike Vaccination Centre, established in 1858, evolved into a school of Western medicine called Tokyo Medical School (東京医学校, Tokyo Igakkō). Although plans to establish the country's first university had been in place just after the Meiji Restoration, it was not until around 1875 that it was decided to form the university by merging these schools.

=== Founding and early days ===
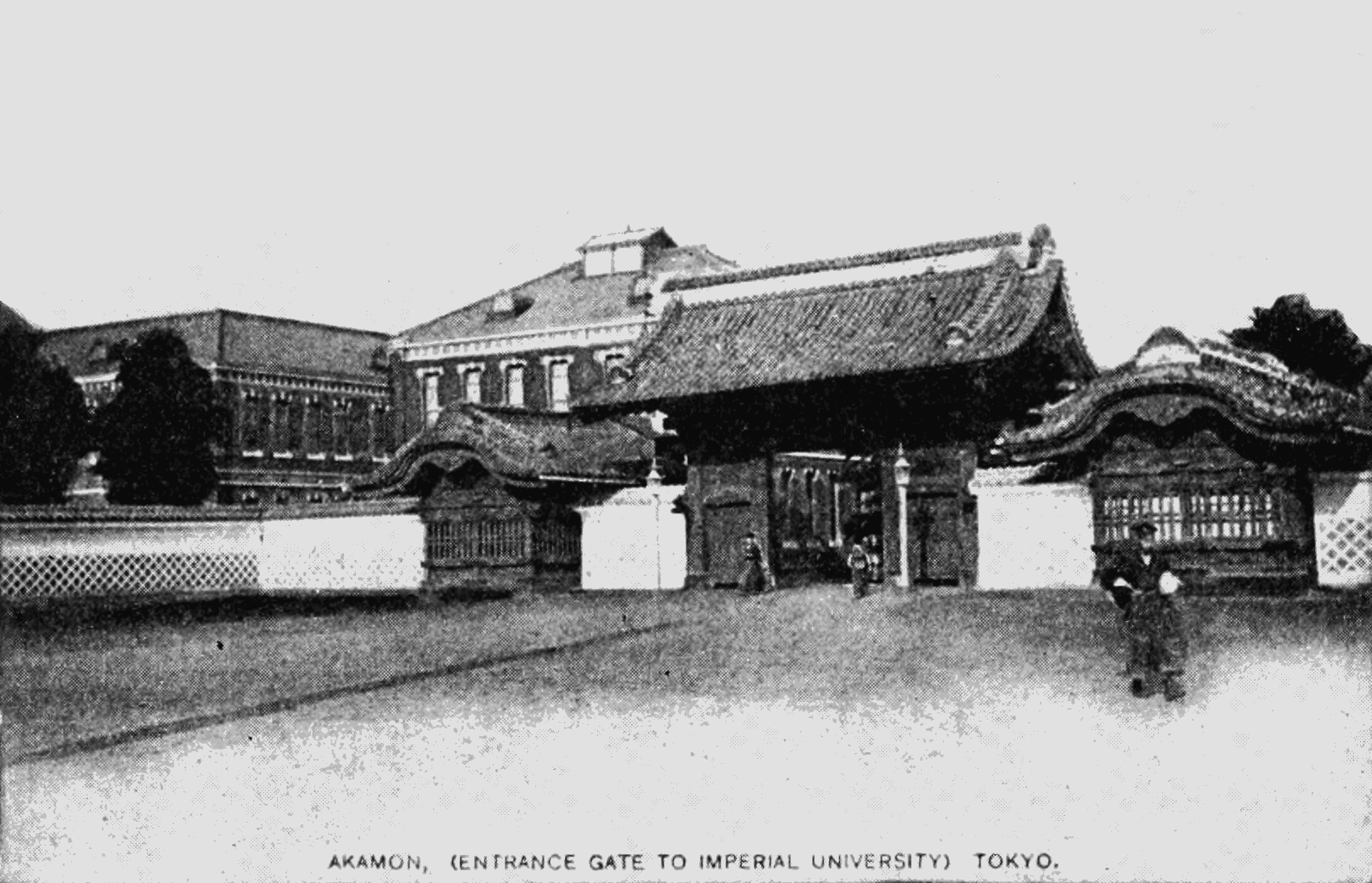
UTokyo's Akamon (Red Gate), built in 1827, as seen c. 1903

The University of Tokyo was chartered on April 12, 1877, by the Meiji government. Corresponding to the fields covered by the predecessor schools, it started with four faculties: Law, Science, Letters, and Medicine. The Imperial College of Engineering later merged into the university as the Faculty of Engineering. In 1886, the university was renamed Imperial University, and it adopted the name Tokyo Imperial University in 1897 after the founding of another imperial university. By 1888, all faculties had completed their relocation to the former site of the Tokyo residence of the Maeda family in Hongo. Among the few extant structures predating this relocation is a gate called Akamon, which has since become a widely recognised symbol of the university.

In the early Meiji period, the government looked to different countries for different disciplines, drawing especially on British, French, German, and American traditions. Following this policy, UTokyo and its predecessor institutions sent their graduates to universities in these respective countries and also invited lecturers from those countries. By the 1880s, however, the government had grown concerned about the political ideas associated with foreign models of higher learning, and Minister of Education Takato Oki instructed the university to reduce the use of English as a language of instruction and to adopt Japanese instead. This shift coincided with the return of UTokyo alumni who had completed their education in Europe, and these returnees began filling roles that had been predominantly held by foreign scholars.

=== Interwar period ===
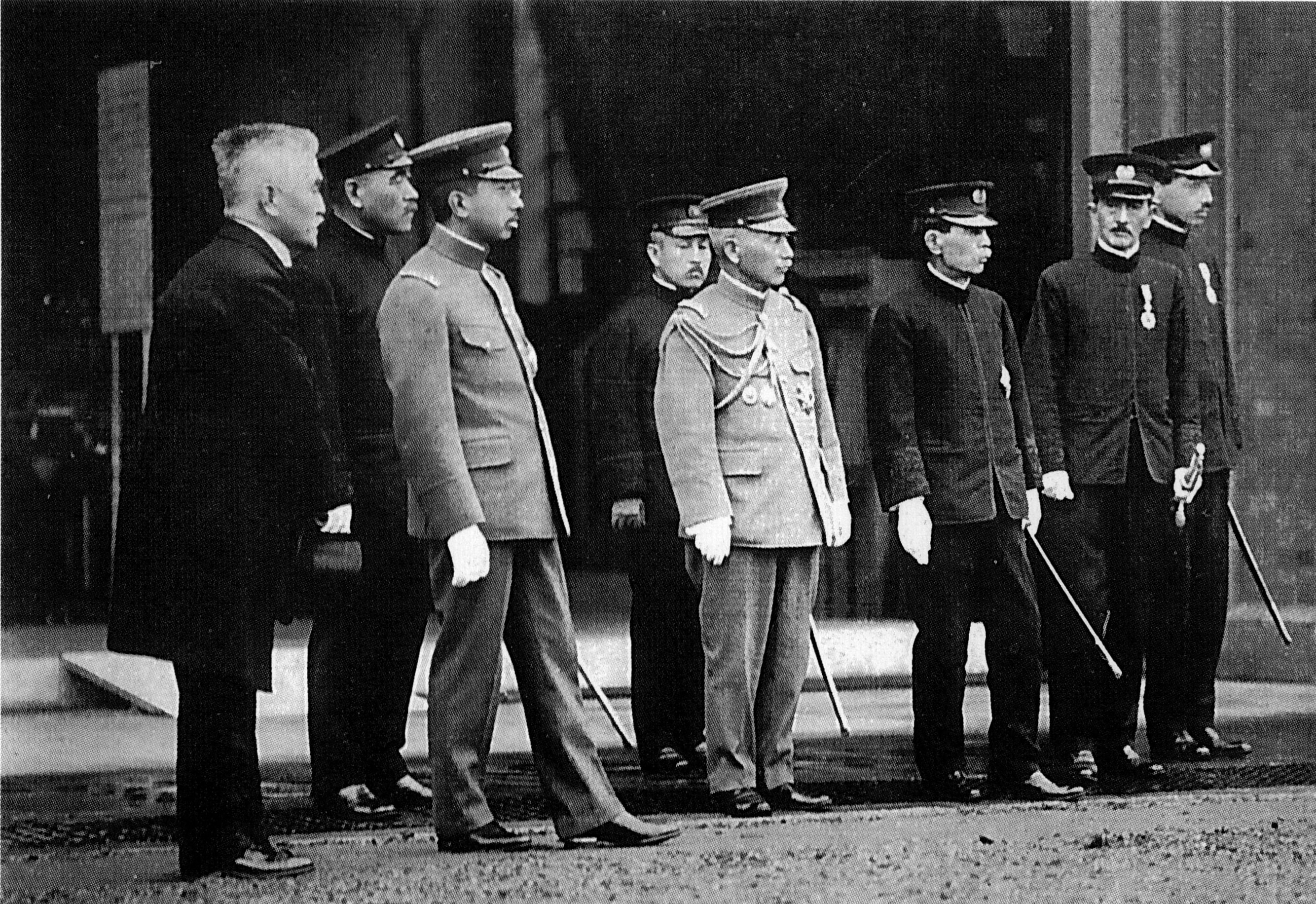
Emperor Hirohito opening a new campus (now known as the Phase II portion of the Komaba Campus) for the Institute of Aeronautics in 1930

The first half of the Interwar period in Japan was characterised by the spread of liberal ideas, collectively known as Taishō Democracy. This movement was ushered in by the concept of Minpon Shugi by Sakuzō Yoshino, as well as Tatsukichi Minobe's interpretation of sovereignty as inherent to the state rather than the monarchy. Both were alumni and professors at the Faculty of Law. As such ideas were came to be accepted widely, prime minister Takaaki Katō, an alumnus of UTokyo, extended suffrage to all males aged 25 and over in 1925, as promised in his manifesto. This liberal tendency was also shared among students, exemplified by the labour movement organisation the UTokyo Association of New People (東大新人会, Tōdai Shinjin-kai) and the UTokyo Settlement (東大セツルメント, Tōdai Settlement). However, strong reactions against these liberal and socialist ideas also emerged at the university, notably from Shinkichi Uesugi, who mentored and greatly influenced three future prime ministers among his students at UTokyo: Nobusuke Kishi, Eisaku Satō, and Takeo Fukuda.

==== Great Kanto Earthquake ====
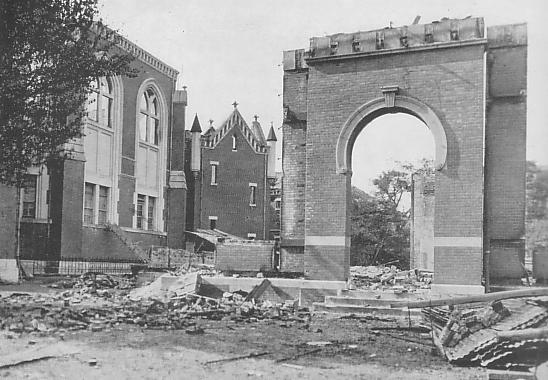
The University of Tokyo suffered immense damage in the Great Earthquake of 1923.

On September 1, 1923, the Great Kanto Earthquake struck the Kanto Plain, inflicting immense damage upon the university. This damage included the complete destruction of almost all of its main buildings, including the library, as well as the loss of scientific and historical materials. This led to a university-wide debate as to whether it should relocate to a larger site, such as Yoyogi, but ultimately, such plans were rejected. Instead, the university purchased additional land in its vicinity, which was still owned by the Maeda family, and expanded there.

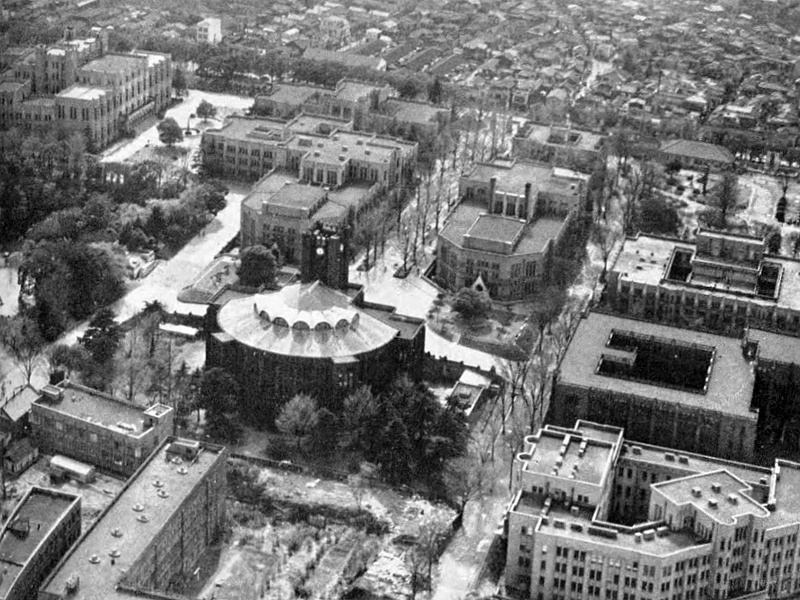
Most of the buildings on the Hongo Campus today were built during the reconstruction period in a style known as Uchida Gothic, including Yasuda Auditorium and the General Library.

The reconstruction of the university and its library was discussed at the fourth General Assembly of the League of Nations in September 1923, where it was decided to provide support. John D. Rockefeller Jr. donated $2 million, and in the United Kingdom formed a committee led by Arthur Balfour to assist the rebuilding effort. Many of the buildings on the Hongo Campus today were built during this reconstruction period in the style known as Uchida Gothic, after the architect Yoshikazu Uchida.

The earthquake also led to the expansion of its seismology studies. The university already had a long tradition of seismological research, to which its alumnus and professor Fusakichi Omori had made important contributions. The university set up an independent seismology department in November 1923, which was followed by the establishment of the Earthquake Research Institute in 1925.

=== World War II ===
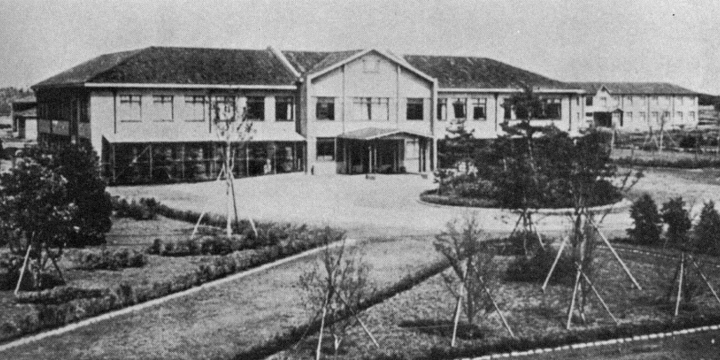
UTokyo's Second Faculty of Engineering was established in 1942 to meet the growing demand for engineers during the Second World War. It evolved into the Institute of Industrial Science after the war.

In 1941, the Empire of Japan attacked the American bases at Pearl Harbor and entered World War II. By late 1943, as Japan faced defeats in the Pacific theatre, a decision was made to enlist university students in the humanities. During the war, 1,652 students and alumni of UTokyo were killed, including those from varied civilian professions such as doctors, engineers, and diplomats, as well as those killed in action. They are commemorated in a memorial erected near the front gate of the Hongo Campus. Most students studying engineering and science remained at university or worked as apprentice engineers, as the knowledge of science and technology was deemed indispensable for the war effort. The buildings and facilities of UTokyo were largely immune from air raids, allowing education and research activities to continue.

The increased demand brought about by the war for engineers led to the establishment of the Second Faculty of Engineering (第二工学部) at UTokyo in 1942. At the newly built Chiba Campus, around 800 students were enrolled at a time, and military engineering research was conducted there. It was closed in 1951, and as a successor organisation, the Institute of Industrial Science was established on the site of the former headquarters of the Third Infantry Regiment in Roppongi.

During the war, the Imperial Army attempted to use the university's facilities several times. In 1945, plans were made to relocate the university to Sendai and use the Hongo Campus as a fortress for the anticipated Allied landing, but President Yoshikazu Uchida dissuaded the army. In September 1945, Uchida and Shigeru Nambara, Dean of the Faculty of Law, prevented the campus from becoming the Allied Headquarters. Nambara succeeded Uchida as president in December 1945.

=== Post-war period ===
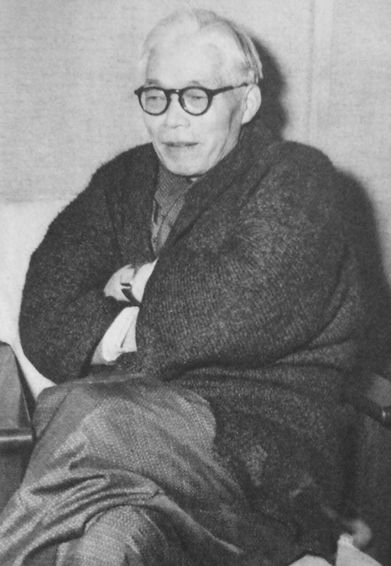
Shigeru Nambara, the first post-war president of the university (1945–1951)

In 1947, following Japan's defeat in the Second World War, the university dropped the word 'Imperial' from its name and reverted to the University of Tokyo. During the occupation period, Japan's education system was reformed, and under President Shigeru Nambara the university was reorganised under the new post-war system. Nambara was also appointed chairman of the Education Reform Committee and oversaw changes at other educational institutions nationwide.

In 1949, as part of the reforms, UTokyo merged with two Higher Schools, which were university preparatory boarding schools. It thereby became a four-year university instead of the pre-war three-year one. One of the higher schools that merged with UTokyo, the First Higher School, became the College of Arts and Sciences on the Komaba campus. At the request of SCAP, the Department of Education was separated from the Faculty of Letters to form the Faculty of Education. It was also during this period that UTokyo first admitted its female students. The first nineteen female students were matriculated in April 1946.

==== University of Tokyo Struggles ====
The 1960s saw an intensification of student protests across the world, including the Anti-Vietnam War protests and the May 68 protest in France. In Japan, the 1960 Anpo protests marked an early stage of this unrest, during which the death of UTokyo student Michiko Kamba drew nationwide attention.

In 1968, the University of Tokyo Struggles (東大紛争, Tōdai Funsō) began with medical students demanding improvements in internship conditions, under which they worked long unpaid hours before qualifying as doctors. The conflict intensified with the indefinite strike decision by the students in January 1968 and escalated further following a clash between the students and faculty. Tensions peaked when radicalised students, most of whom were members of the Zenkyōtō (the All-Campus Joint Struggle Committees), occupied Yasuda Auditorium. After the resignation of university executives, Ichiro Kato was appointed interim president and opened negotiations with the occupying students. The conflict largely ended in January 1969 after a full-scale police operation to remove the occupying students. This operation involved more than 8,500 riot police officers confronting students who fought back with Molotov cocktails and marble stones taken from the auditorium's interior. Prime Minister Eisaku Sato, who was an alumnus of UTokyo himself, visited the site the day after the students were removed, and decided to cancel that year's admission process. The aftermath saw 633 prosecutions, and varied sentences.

=== 21st century ===
==== Women's education ====
The university first admitted female students in 1946. While the student body has remained predominantly male, various attempts have been made to achieve a more equal gender ratio. In 2023, women made up 23 per cent of first-year undergraduates, the highest percentage in the university's history. A quarter of graduate students were female in 2022.

==== Reforms in the 21st century ====
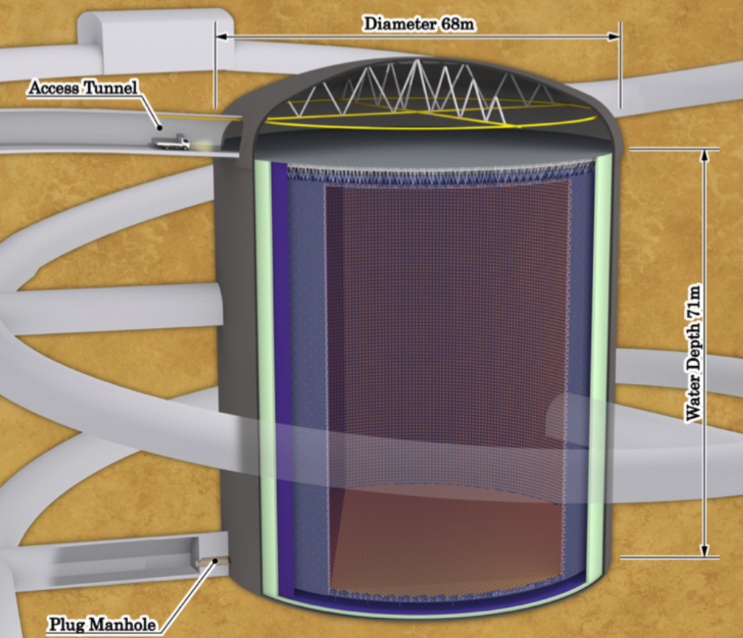
UTokyo's Kamiokande project detected cosmic neutrinos for the first time in human history and later proved neutrinos have mass, resulting in Nobel Prizes in 2003 and 2015.

Questions of international standing and competitiveness were a recurring concern in national higher-education policy and in the university's own strategic planning throughout the 2010s. One widely cited indicator was the university's position in international rankings: when the Times Higher Education World University Rankings were first published in partnership with Quacquarelli Symonds in 2004, UTokyo was ranked 12th in the world, whereas in the 2024 Times Higher Education rankings it was ranked 29th.

In response, UTokyo has implemented a series of reforms. In 2004, the University of Tokyo Edge Capital Partners (UTEC) was established to support entrepreneurship arising from university research. In 2006, the first phase of development was completed at Kashiwa Campus. Located in the suburb of Kashiwa, this research-focused campus spans 405,313 square metres (100 acres) and has a focus on advanced scientific research. In addition, UTokyo expanded autumn matriculation opportunities for international students and adopted other measures to strengthen its international competitiveness and research environment.

== Organisation ==
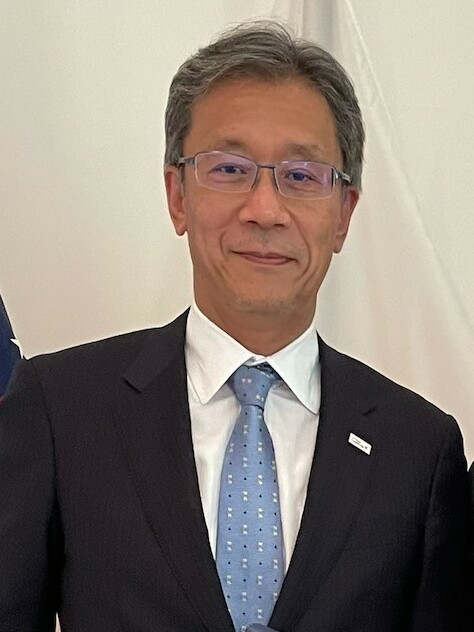
Teruo Fujii, the 31st president of the University of Tokyo

The University of Tokyo operates under a centralised administrative structure, with key policies set by the administrative council, which is chaired by the president. However, due to the university's historical development as a merger of various institutions, each of the constituent colleges, faculties, and research institutes maintains its own administrative board. Today, the University of Tokyo is organised into 10 faculties and 15 graduate schools.

The leader of the University of Tokyo is known as the president (総長, sōchō) and it is a substantive leadership role. The president is elected by the university's board council from among the faculty members for a term of six years. The current president is Teruo Fujii, a scholar in applied microfluidics, who assumed the role in April 2021 and is expected to serve until March 2027.

=== Faculties and graduate schools ===
The University of Tokyo's academic structure consists of 10 faculties and their affiliated graduate schools. This organisational structure was introduced as a result of reforms in the 1990s.

Faculty	Founded	Locations	Affiliated graduate schools	Colour
Law	1872	Hongo	Graduate Schools for Law and Politics	Green
Medicine	1868	Hongo, Shirokane	Graduate School of Medicine	Red
Engineering	1871	Hongo, Kashiwa, Komaba II, Asano	Graduate School of Engineering, Graduate School of Frontier Sciences, Graduate School of Information Science and Technology	White
Letters	1868	Hongo	Graduate School of Humanities and Sociology	None
Science	1877	Hongo, Komaba (maths)	Graduate School of Science, Graduate School of Mathematical Sciences	Benikaba
Agriculture	1886	Hongo (Yayoi)	Graduate School of Agricultural and Life Sciences	Indigo
Economics	1919	Hongo	Graduate School of Economics	Blue
Arts and Sciences	1886	Komaba	Graduate School of Arts and Sciences	Black and Yellow
Education	1949	Hongo, Nakano	Graduate School of Education	Orange
Pharmaceutical Sciences	1958	Hongo	Graduate School of Pharmaceutical Sciences	Enji

In addition to the graduate schools affiliated with specific faculties, the University of Tokyo also includes two independent graduate institutions: the Graduate School of Interdisciplinary Information Studies and the Graduate School of Public Policy (GraSPP).

In 2025, UTokyo announced a plan to launch a five-year programme called the College of Design, starting in the autumn of 2027. This would be the first faculty to be established in nearly 70 years, since the founding of the Faculty of Pharmaceutical Sciences in 1958.

=== Research institutes ===
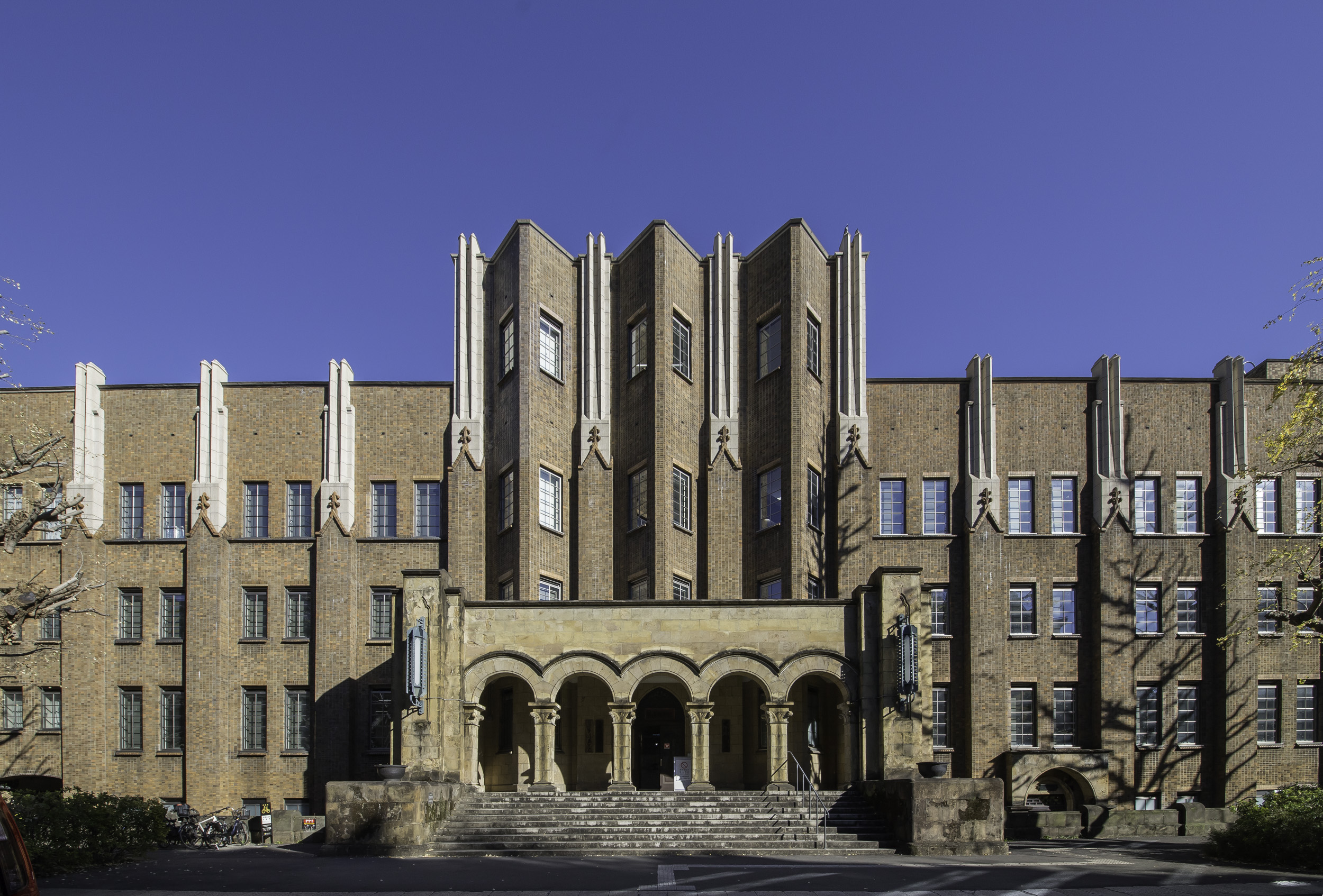
The Historiographical Institute at Hongo

Apart from the faculties and graduate schools, the University of Tokyo hosts eleven affiliated research institutes (附置研究所). Simultaneously, they function as educational institutions for the graduate schools.

- Atmosphere and Ocean Research Institute (大気海洋研究所)
- Earthquake Research Institute
- Historiographical Institute
- Institute for Advanced Studies on Asia (formerly known as Institute of Oriental Culture, 東洋文化研究所)
- Institute for Cosmic Ray Research
- Institute for Solid State Physics (物性研究所)
- Institute of Industrial Science (生産技術研究所)
- Institute of Medical Science
- Institute for Quantitative Biosciences (定量生命科学研究所)
- Institute of Social Science (社会科学研究所)
- Research Center for Advanced Science and Technology (先端科学技術研究センター)

==== UTokyo Institutes For Advanced Study (UTIAS) ====
UTokyo Institutes For Advanced Study (UTIAS) started in January 2011. There are four UTIAS institutes as of November 2023.

- Tokyo College
- Kavli Institute for the Physics and Mathematics of the Universe
- International Research Center for Neurointelligence (IRCN)
- The University of Tokyo Pandemic preparedness, Infection and Advanced research center (UTOPIA)

=== University of Tokyo Library System ===
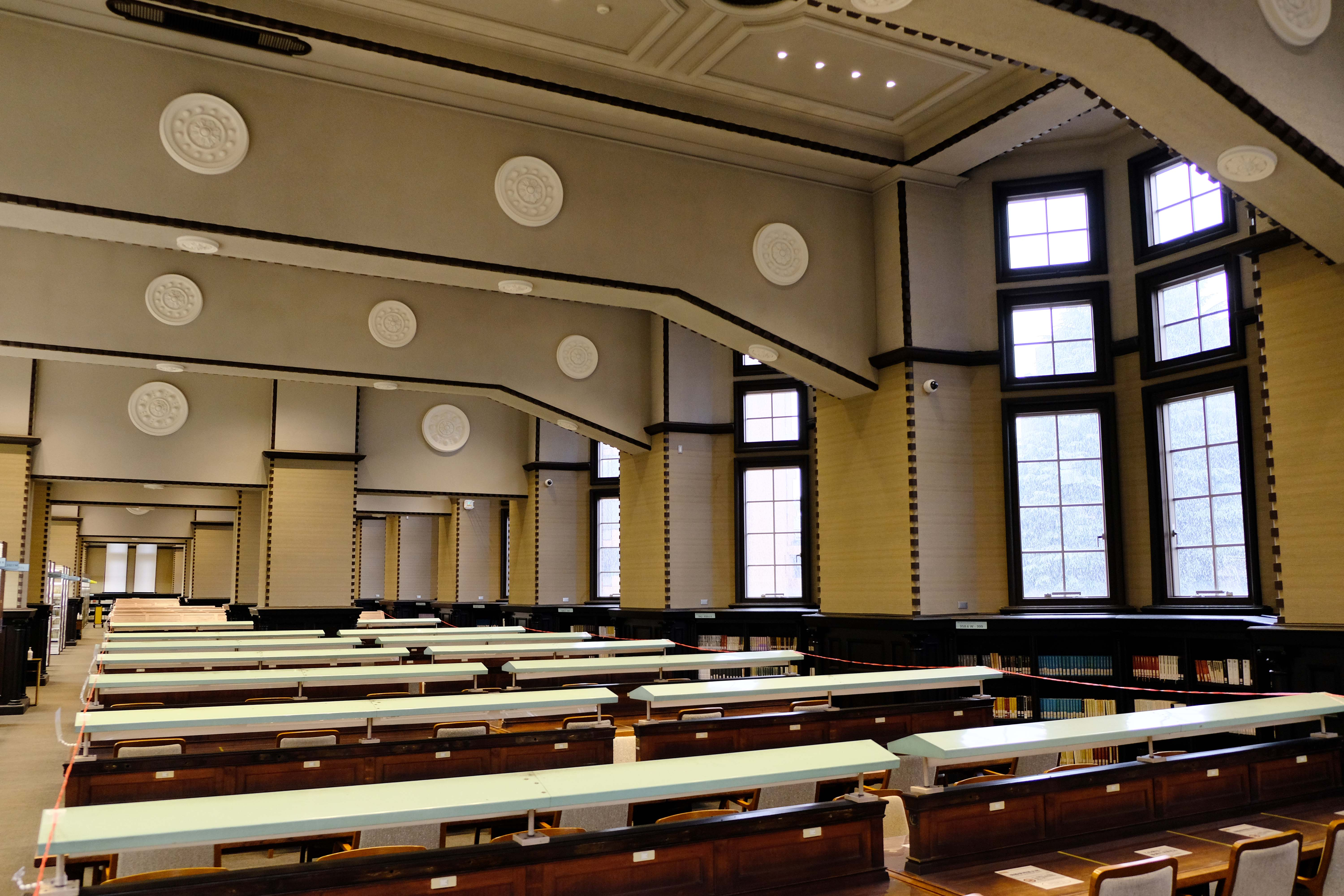
One of the reading rooms, General Library (Hongo)

The University of Tokyo Library System consists of three comprehensive libraries located on the main campuses—Hongo, Komaba, and Kashiwa—along with 27 other field-specific libraries operated by various faculties and research institutes. As of 2024, the University of Tokyo library has a collection of over 10 million books and numerous materials of historical importance. This collection ranks it as the second-largest library in Japan, surpassed only by the National Diet Library, which holds a collection of approximately 46.8 million books. It also subscribes to about 170,000 journals.

The headquarters of the library is situated in the General Library at Hongo, which underwent thorough renovation in the late 2010s. It now features a 46-metre-deep automated underground storage capable of housing approximately 3 million books.

=== University of Tokyo Hospital ===
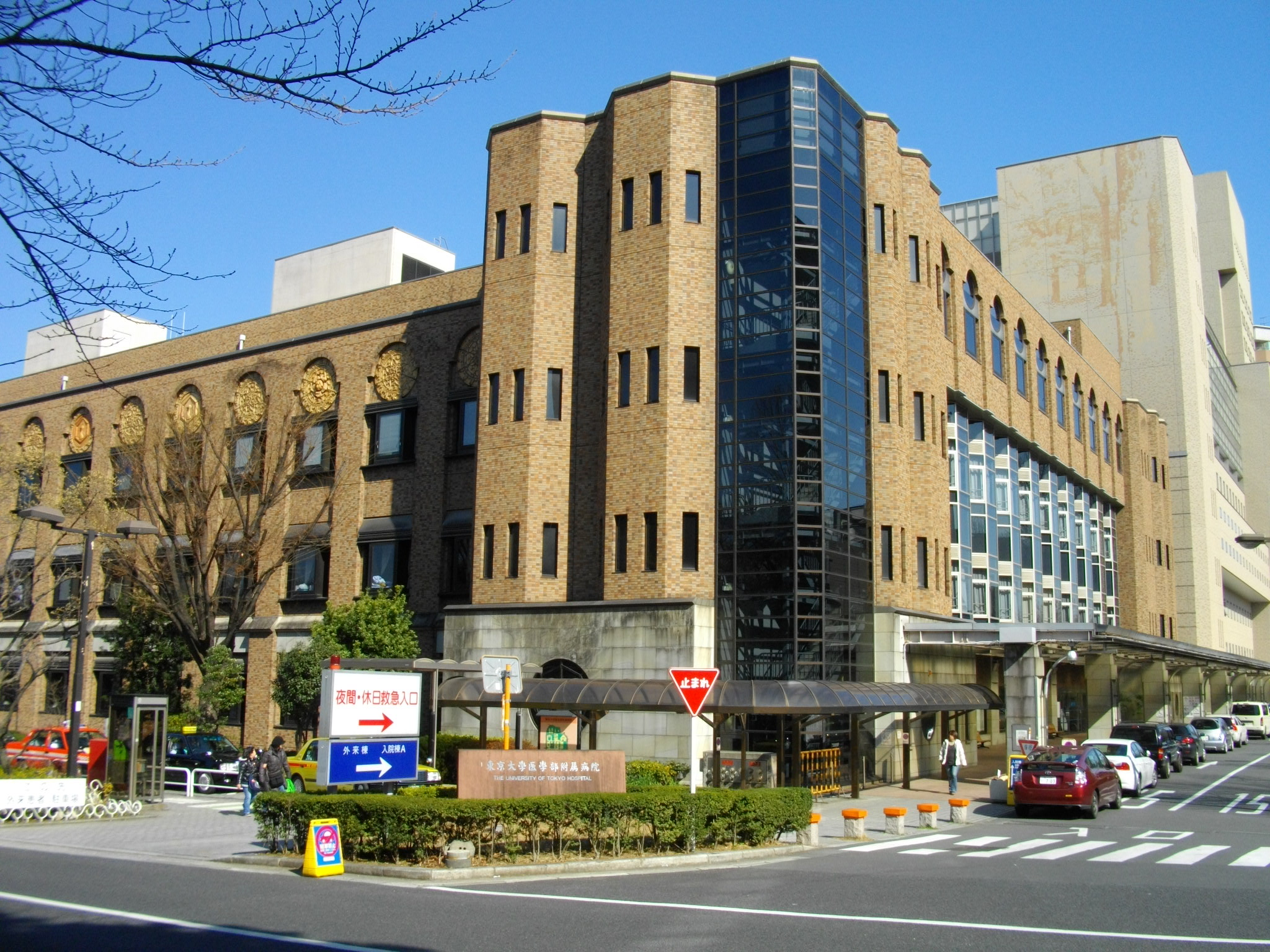
Outpatient Clinic Building of the hospital

The University of Tokyo Hospital is an academic health science centre operated by the Faculty of Medicine. The hospital finds its roots in the Kanda Otamagaike Vaccination Centre, established in 1858. It has 37 clinical examination rooms for a wide range of specialisations including Cardiovascular Medicine and Orthopaedic Surgery, among others. With a capacity of 1,210 beds, the hospital facilitated medical services for 389,830 inpatients and 794,454 outpatients in the fiscal year 2010. Newsweek's World's Best Hospitals 2023 ranks it 17th in the world, 2nd in Asia, and 1st in Japan. It serves as the primary hospital for the Imperial Family of Japan, with both the current emperor and the emperor emeritus having undergone major operations there.

=== Museums ===
The University of Tokyo operates eight museums, three of which fall under the purview of the University Museum (UMUT).

Museum	Location	Operator
University Museum	Hongo	UMUT
INTERMEDIATHEQUE	JP Tower, Marunouchi, Chiyoda	UMUT/Japan Post
University Museum, Koishikawa Annex	Koishikawa botanical garden	UMUT
Komaba Museum	Komaba	College of Arts and Sciences
Museum of Health and Medicine	Hongo	Faculty of Medicine
Medical Science Museum	Shirokanedai	Institute of Medical Sciences
Farm Museum	Tanashi farm	Faculty of Agriculture
Agricultural Museum	Yayoi	Faculty of Agriculture

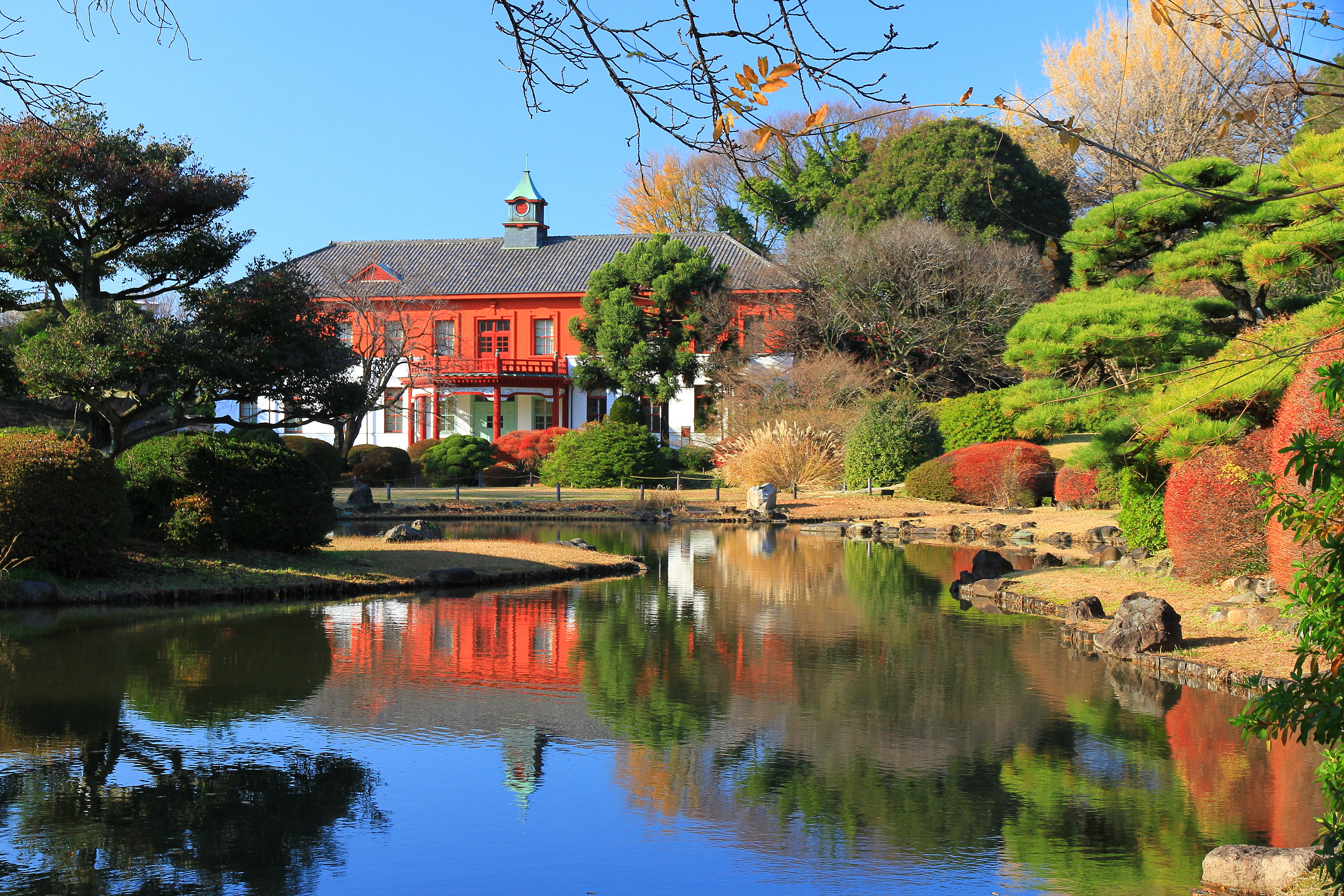
Koishikawa Botanical Garden in autumn

Apart from the aforementioned museums, the University of Tokyo operates several other facilities that are open to the public, among which are two botanical gardens managed by the Faculty of Science: Koishikawa and Nikko.

- Established in 1684, Koishikawa Botanical Garden has been operated by the University of Tokyo since its foundation as a modern university in 1877. In 1894, Hirase Sakugoro the discovered spermatozoids of the ginkgo there, proving that gymnosperms produce sperm cells.
- Nikko Botanical Garden was opended in 1902 in Nikko as an annex to the Koishikawa Garden and primarily focuses on alpine plants.

=== Finances ===
UTokyo's Income and Expenses, 2021-2022 (avg. exchange rate: 1 US$ = 109.8 yen)
Income (billion yen)		Expenses (billion yen)	
Government fundings	93.1	Personnel	106.1
Self-earned income	81.2	Equipment	134.7
External fundings (research grants, endowments)	91.7	Depreciation	27.9

In 2021–2022, the university had an income of 264.1 billion yen. Of this, 93.4 billion yen (35.1%) was funded by the government, primarily through the Expense Management Grant (運営費交付金). Despite being a national university, this grant from the government has been consistently reduced, dropping from 95.5 billion yen in 2005 to 79.9 billion yen in 2022. A total of 81.2 billion yen (30.5%) was self-earned, through sources such as the university hospitals (54.7 billion yen) and academic fees (16.6 billion yen). The remainder, 91.7 billion yen (34.4%), came from external funding, such as research grants and endowments. Although research grants are primarily earned by research groups and not by the university, the university can typically claim up to 30% of them for university operations, which is included in this number.

The total assets of the university are valued at 1.47 trillion yen as of March 31, 2024. Land holdings make up the largest percentage of this figure, valued at 878 billion yen. UTokyo's endowment fund is relatively small, at 44 billion yen as of March 2023. This is because national universities in Japan, including UTokyo, were not allowed to invest in high-risk assets until 2018, so endowments were spent rather than invested until that point. The UTokyo Foundation is the primary fundraising arm of the university, and it accepts both endowments for the university as a whole and purpose-specific donations.

UTokyo's tuition fees have been fixed at 535,000 yen annually for undergraduates and master's students since 2005, regardless of their status (whether domestic or international). This makes up approximately 5% of the university's income. However, the decline in government funding and the university's international standing have brought about discussions on whether to raise these fees.

== Student life ==
=== Admissions ===
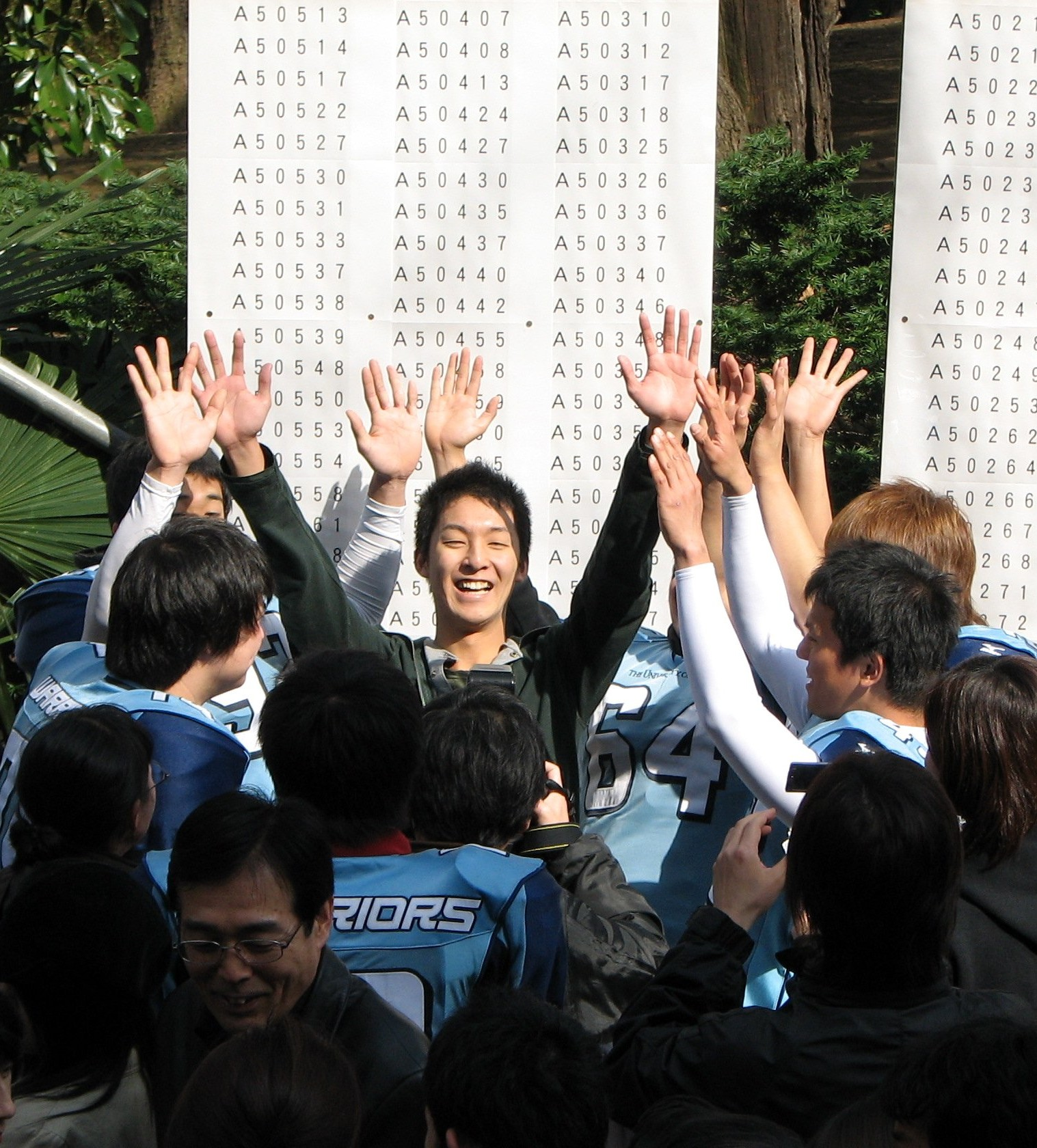
A successful applicant rejoicing on the results day

The University of Tokyo's admission process (東大入試, tōdai nyūshi) is regarded as the most selective in Japan and is almost synonymous with something that is difficult to achieve. To apply, candidates must achieve high scores in the Common Test for University Admissions, a standardised multiple-choice examination. UTokyo applicants are required to take at least seven subjects in this examination. Applicants for natural sciences take two mathematics tests, Japanese, one foreign language, two science subjects chosen from physics, chemistry, biology, and geology, and one social studies subject chosen from geography, Japanese history, or world history. Humanities applicants take two social studies subjects and one science subject instead.

On the basis of the Common Test scores, approximately three times the number of the final admission slots are invited to take the second-stage examination in late February. In that examination, mathematics, Japanese, and one foreign language are compulsory for all applicants. Science applicants are examined in advanced mathematics, English, Japanese, and two science subjects, while humanities applicants take mathematics, a foreign language, advanced Japanese, and two social studies subjects. All applicants, including those for the natural sciences, sit for a written examination in Japanese and Chinese classics as part of the Japanese paper. Some applicants are called upon to take an interview.

Successful candidates are notified in March and are matriculated in April. The published acceptance rate for undergraduate admission is around 30 per cent, but this figure is calculated only for the second-stage examination, after candidates have already been screened on the basis of Common Test scores. Moreover, because applicants to national universities in Japan are effectively limited to a single choice in the main admissions round, candidates with little prospect of admission often apply to other institutions instead.

=== Junior division ===
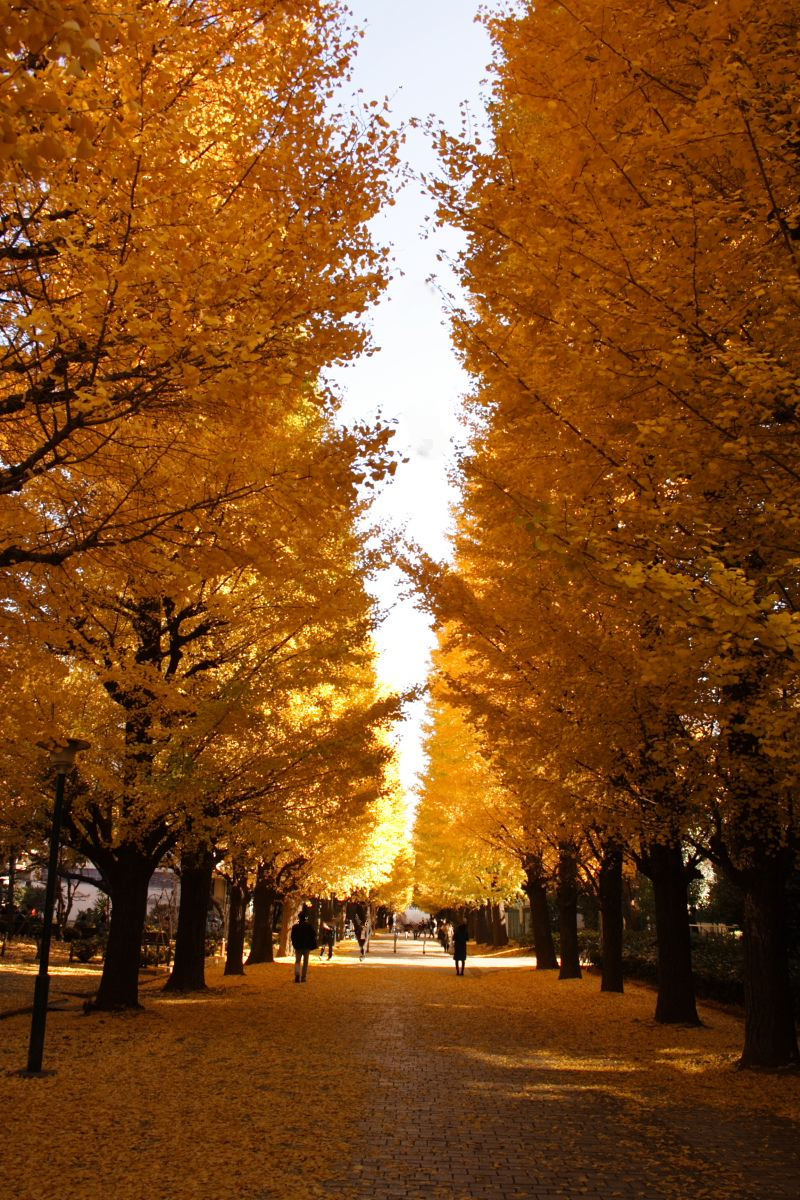
Komaba Campus, where all undergraduates spend a year and a half

The matriculation ceremony takes place on April 12, the foundation day of the university. All first-year students are matriculated at the College of Arts and Sciences at Komaba, which is a remnant of the time when the Komaba Campus was a separate university-preparatory boarding school called the First Higher School until 1949. They spend the first one and a half years of their degrees at Komaba. All students study a foreign language they have not previously studied. Undergraduates at Komaba face shingaku sentaku (進学選択, or colloquially 進振り, shinfuri) in September of their second year, where they are assigned to departments based on their grades at Komaba.

==== Student housing ====
Despite its roots as a boarding school, most undergraduates at the university either live with their families or in private accommodation. Since the closure of the Komaba Dormitory (駒場寮, Komaba-ryō) in August 2001, there has been no on-campus accommodation for domestic students at the university. There are four university dormitories available for undergraduate students: Mitaka, Toshima, Oiwake and Mejirodai. In 2021, approximately five per cent of the undergraduate students lived in one of the university dormitories. The university offers more options for international students, with on-campus dormitories available for them at Komaba and Kashiwa.

==== Student newspapers and magazines ====
The Todai Shimbun (東大新聞) is one of the university's longest-running student publications, with its first issue in 1920. Recruit was spun off from its advertising branch in 1961. Other student publications include Kokasha (恒河沙), whose start-of-term issues contain student evaluations of lecturers and are widely used by students in the junior division when choosing courses.

=== Senior division ===
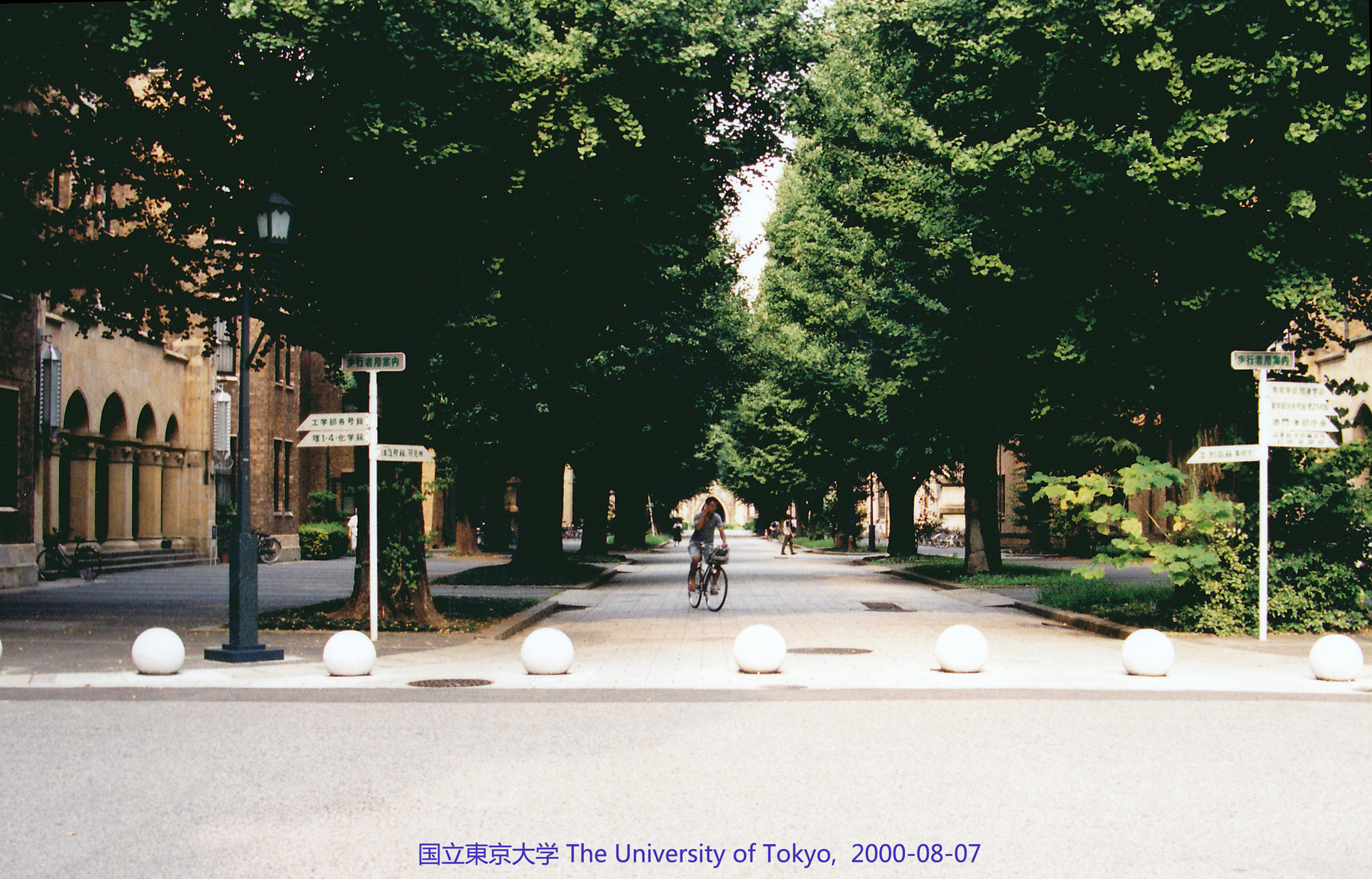
Hongo campus, where most senior-division departments are located

After completing the Shingaku Sentaku, second-year students enter senior-division departments to specialise in their chosen fields. With the exception of the senior division of the College of Arts and Sciences and the Department of Mathematics, which are located in Komaba, all other senior departments are situated in Hongo. Consequently, approximately 85 per cent of the students move to Hongo at this point of their studies.

Graduation ceremonies take place towards the end of March. Approximately one-third of the graduates enter the workforce upon graduation, while the remainder continue their studies at graduate schools within the university or at universities abroad. Common destinations include academia, government ministries, major private-sector employers, trading houses, consulting firms, and investment banks.

=== International students ===
As of May 1, 2026, the University of Tokyo hosts 5,383 international students, who represent 17.67 per cent of the total student body. Of these, 5,179 are postgraduate students and 446 are undergraduates. Exchange students and postdoctoral researchers are not included in these numbers. At the undergraduate level, international students may enter through Japanese-language admissions for students educated overseas, English-medium programmes such as PEAK, or exchange programmes. A wider variety of postgraduate programmes are offered in English, making the international student ratio significantly higher for postgraduate studies (30.66 per cent in May 2026).

Starting in Autumn 2027, UTokyo plans to offer a five-year programme called the College of Design. The programme aims to 'redefine design as a broad concept (...) based on interdisciplinary knowledge that integrates the humanities, social sciences, natural sciences, engineering and other fields'. Approximately 100 students will be matriculated annually, with half of them coming from overseas.

== Academic rankings and reputation ==
University rankings
Global
THE	General	26
THE Reputation	General	10
QS	General	36=
ARWU	Research	31
Nature Index Academic	Research	16

Regional
THE Asia (Asia version)	General	4
QS Asia (Asia version)	General	21

The University of Tokyo has been ranked in a range of university rankings based on different criteria.

- The Times Higher Education World University Rankings ranked UTokyo 26th in the world in 2025 (1st in Japan). Its subject rankings ranked UTokyo 1st in the country for all subjects it covers. The Times Higher Education World Reputation Rankings 2023 ranked UTokyo 10th in the world (1st in Japan, 2nd in Asia). In 2017, its Alma Mater Index, which measures universities around the world by the number of CEOs of Fortune Global 500 companies among their alumni, ranked UTokyo 16th in the world.
- The QS World University Rankings ranked UTokyo 32nd in the world in 2024 (1st in Japan). Its subject rankings ranked UTokyo 1st in Japan for all academic disciplines the university covers except for Classics and Ancient History, for which KyotoU was recognised as the best. The university was ranked 11th in the world for Natural Sciences, 18th for Engineering and Technology, 35th for Social Sciences & Management, and 32nd for Arts and Humanities.

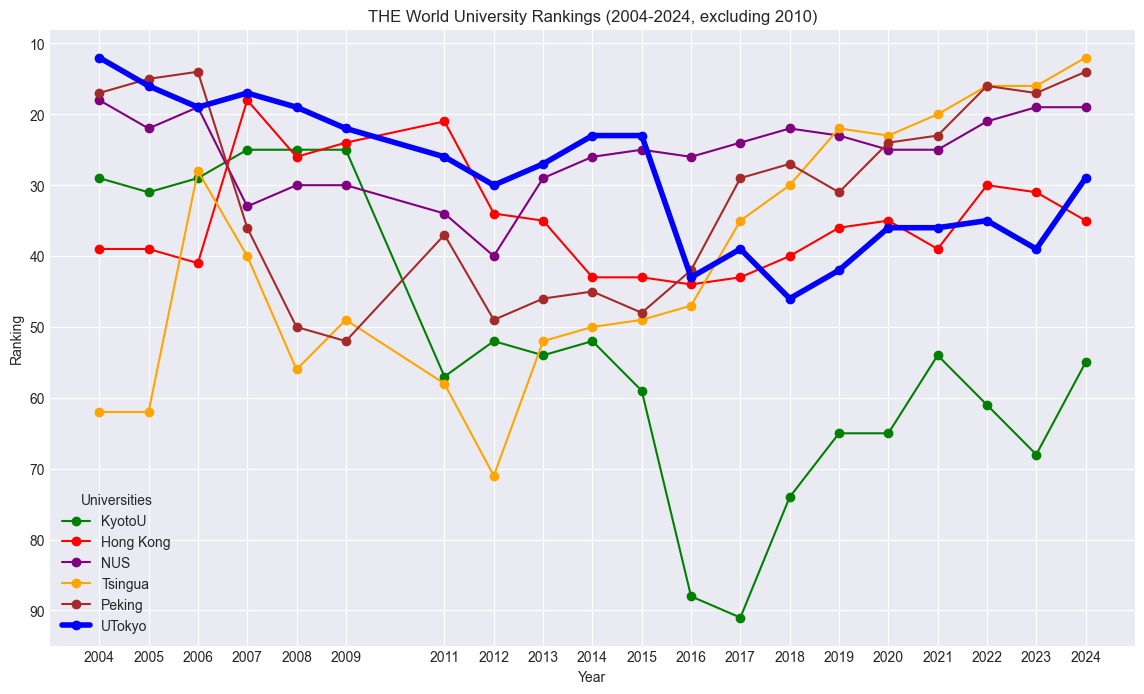
UTokyo's performance in The World University rankings compared to other universities (2004-2009 and 2011–2024)

- UTokyo has consistently been the largest recipient of the KAKENHI Grants-in-Aid for Scientific Research (Japan's largest national research grant) in the country. In FY2022, it alone received approximately 10 percent of the total grants awarded to 1,370 institutions across Japan.
- In 2023, Newsweek recognised the University of Tokyo Hospital as the 17th best hospital in the world (2nd in Asia after Singapore General Hospital, 1st in Japan).

=== Subject rankings ===
QS World University Rankings by Subject 2024
Subject	Global	National
Arts & Humanities	▲ =32	1
Linguistics	=24	1
Theology, Divinity and Religious Studies	46	1
Archaeology	▼24	1
Architecture and Built Environment	▲15	1
Art and Design	▼49	1
Classics and Ancient History	▲42	2
English Language and Literature	▼37	1
History	▲12	1
Art History	6	1
Modern Languages	▲7	1
Philosophy	▲51–100	▲1–2
Engineering and Technology	▲18	1
Engineering – Chemical	▲15	1
Engineering – Civil and Structural	▲21	1
Computer Science and Information Systems	▲ =38	1
Engineering – Electrical and Electronic	▼33	1
Engineering – Petroleum	10	1
Engineering – Mechanical	=21	1
Life Sciences & Medicine	▲36	1
Agriculture and Forestry	▼36	1
Anatomy and Physiology	▲28	1
Biological Sciences	▼31	1
Medicine	42	1
Nursing	101–150	1
Pharmacy and Pharmacology	▼41	1
Psychology	▲ =77	1
Veterinary Science	▼48	1
Natural Sciences	=11	1
Chemistry	▼15	1
Earth and Marine Sciences	▲11	1
Environmental Sciences	▲ =31	1
Geography	▼18	1
Geology	▲ =12	1
Geophysics	=13	1
Materials Sciences	20	1
Mathematics	▼29	1
Physics and Astronomy	▲9	1
Social Sciences & Management	▼35	1
Accounting and Finance	▲39	1
Anthropology	▲33	1
Business and Management Studies	▲ =87	1
Communication and Media Studies	▲51–100	1
Development Studies	▲ =26	1
Economics and Econometrics	▲33	1
Education and Training	▲ =57	1
Law and Legal Studies	▼22	1
Politics	▼ =39	1
Social Policy and Administration	▼ =29	1
Sociology	▲ =24	1
Sports–Related Subjects	49	1
Statistics and Operational Research	▲34	1

THE World University Rankings by Subject 2024
Subject	Global	National
Arts & humanities	▼60	1
Business & economics	▲ =28	1
Clinical & health	▲30	1
Computer science	▲33	1
Education	▲25	1
Engineering	▲29	1
Life sciences	▲30	1
Physical sciences	▲24	1
Psychology	▲61	1
Social sciences	▲ =40	1

ARWU Global Ranking of Academic Subjects 2023
Subject	Global	National
Natural Sciences
Mathematics	▼51–75	▲1–2
Physics	▼5	1
Chemistry	▼24	1
Earth Sciences	▼34	1
Geography	201–300	1
Ecology	201–300	1–2
Oceanography	▼48	1
Atmospheric Science	▼38	1
Engineering
Mechanical Engineering	▼151–200	▼3
Electrical & Electronic Engineering	▲151–200	1
Automation & Control	47	1
Instruments Science & Technology	101–150	1
Biomedical Engineering	▼101–150	1–2
Computer Science & Engineering	101–150	1
Civil Engineering	▼76–100	1
Chemical Engineering	151–200	1
Materials Science & Engineering	76–100	▲1
Nanoscience & Nanotechnology	▼101–150	1
Energy Science & Engineering	▼101–150	1
Environmental Science & Engineering	151–200	1
Water Resources	▲76–100	1
Biotechnology	▼151–200	1–2
Transportation Science & Technology	▼151–200	1–2
Remote Sensing	51–75	1
Metallurgical Engineering	▲51–75	▲3–4
Life Sciences
Biological Sciences	▲76–100	▼4
Human Biological Sciences	▼151–200	▼3
Agricultural Sciences	▼401–500	▼2–3
Veterinary Sciences	▼201–300	1–6
Medical Sciences
Clinical Medicine	201–300	1
Public Health	201–300	▲1
Nursing	201–300	1
Medical Technology	301–400	▲1–6
Pharmacy & Pharmaceutical Sciences	101–150	1
Social Sciences
Economics	201–300	1
Statistics	101–150	1
Political Sciences	▲201–300	▲1–2
Communication	201–300	1
Psychology	201–300	1

== Sites ==
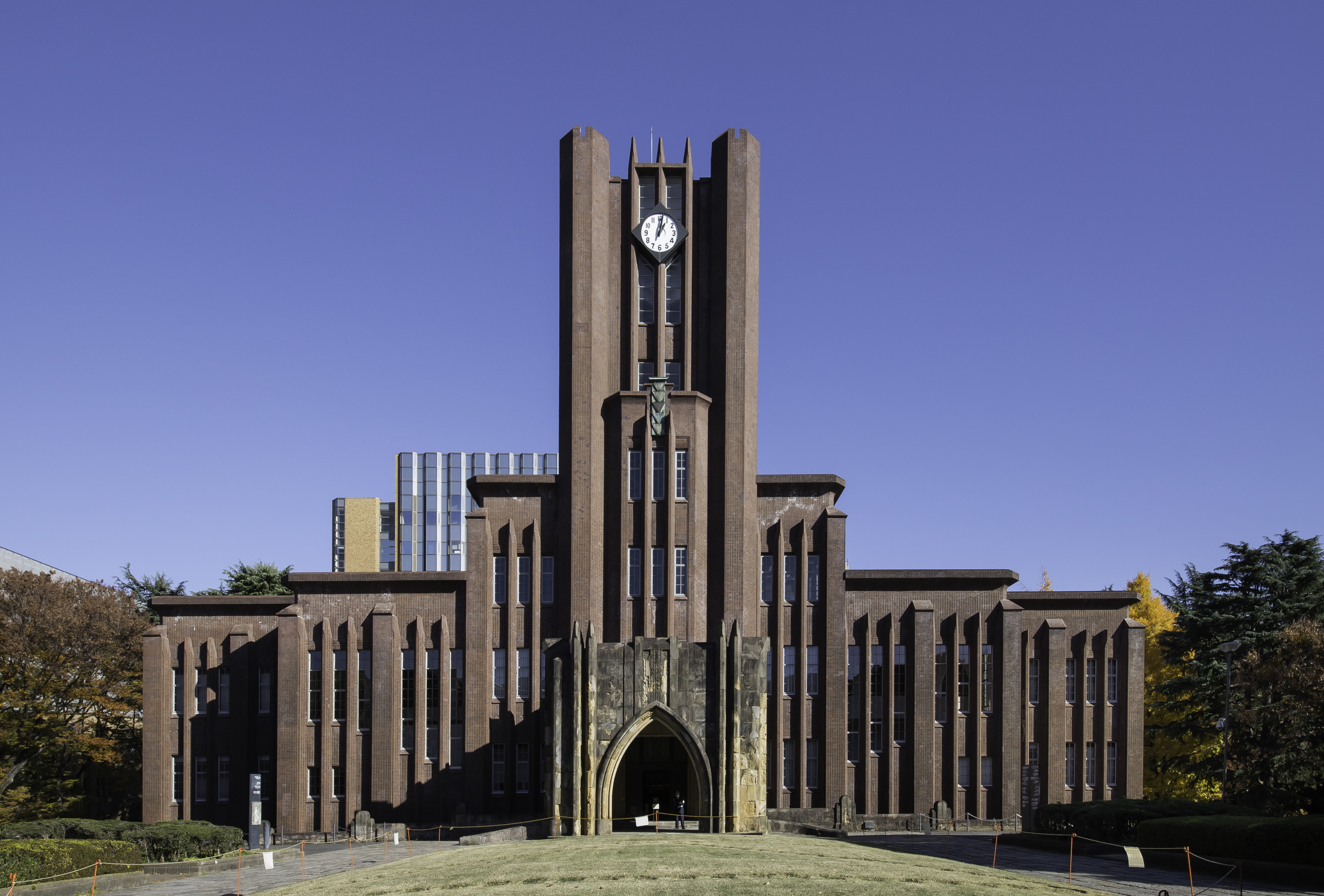
Yasuda Auditorium

The University of Tokyo is organised around three principal campuses: Hongo, Komaba, and Kashiwa. Apart from these main campuses, the university has a number of smaller campuses, research stations, farms, observatories, and other facilities in Japan and overseas. The university's land holdings in Japan amount to 326 square kilometres, and its real estate assets were valued at 1.14 trillion yen as of 31 March 2023.

=== Hongo campus ===
The Hongo campus has been the university's centre since 1884, when the university's administration office relocated to the site. The campus faces Shinobazu Pond in Ueno Park to the east and has in its vicinity the electric district Akihabara, the city's bookshop hub, Jimbōchō, and the city's largest indoor stadium, Tokyo Dome. The campus is served by three Tokyo Metro stations: Hongo-sanchome, Todai-mae, and Nezu. It occupies the former estate of the Maeda family, Edo period feudal lords of Kaga Province. One of the university's best known landmarks, Akamon (the Red Gate), is a relic of this era. The symbol of the university is the ginkgo leaf, from the trees found throughout the area. The Hongo campus also hosts UTokyo's annual May Festival.

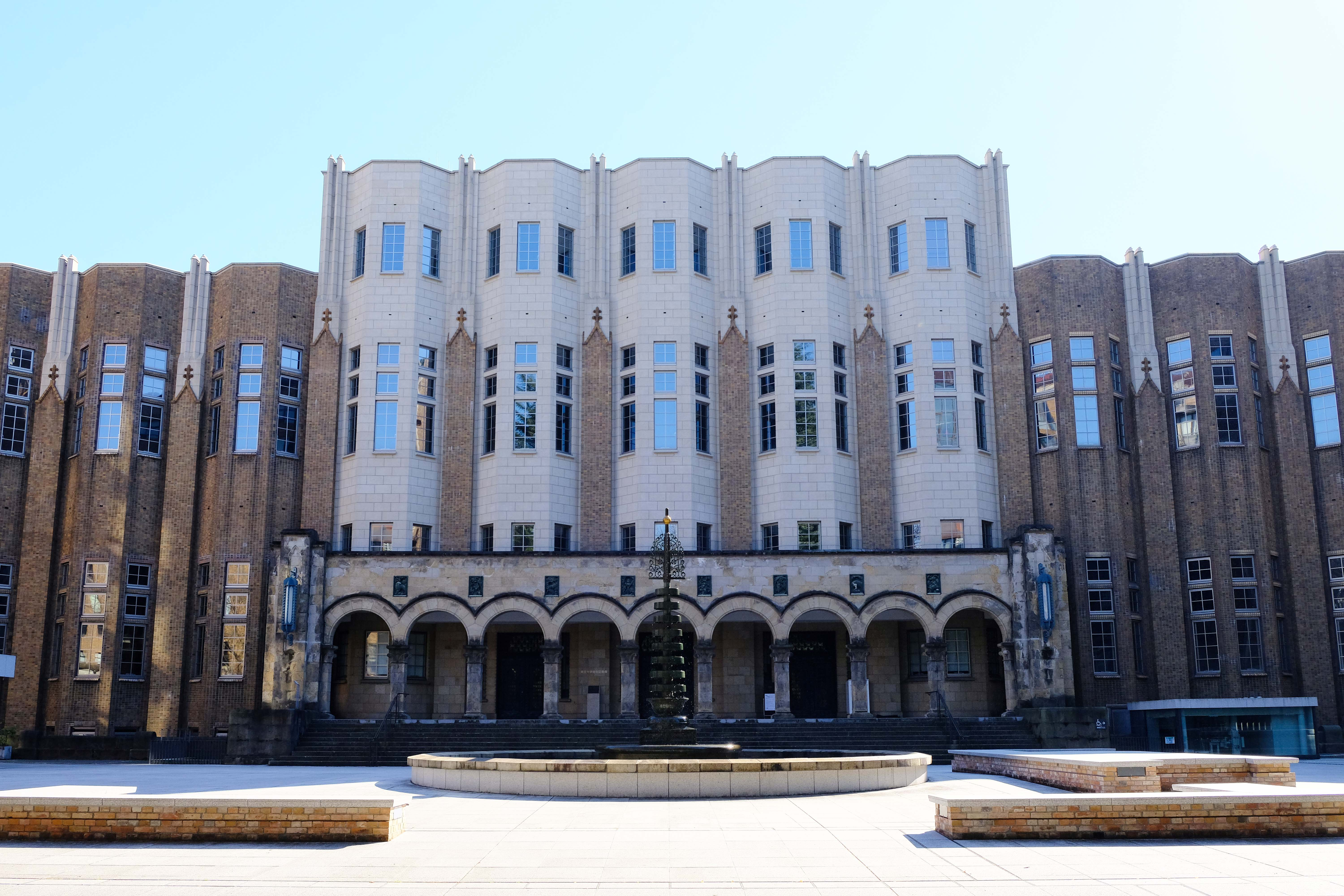
General Library

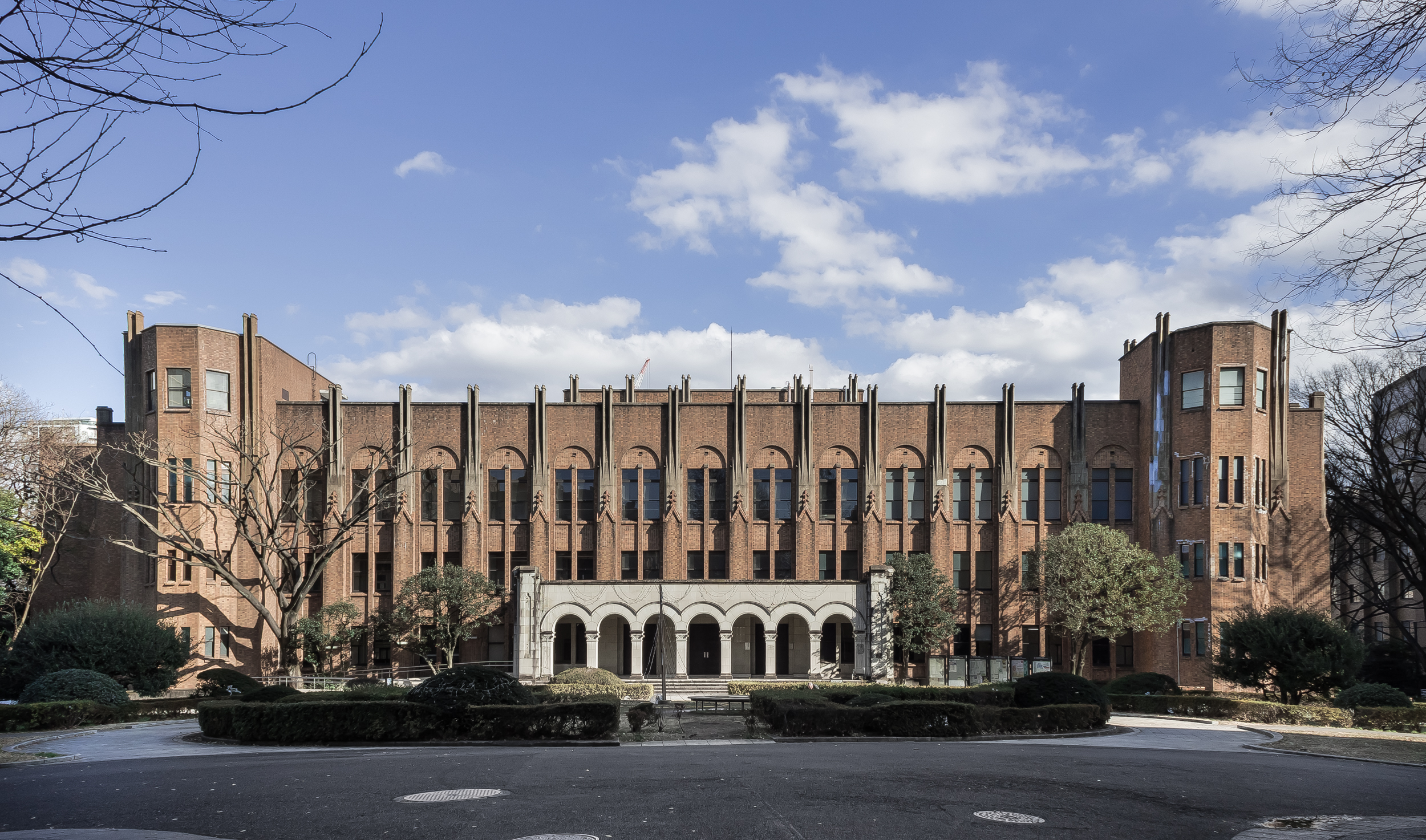
Faculty of Medicine Building 2

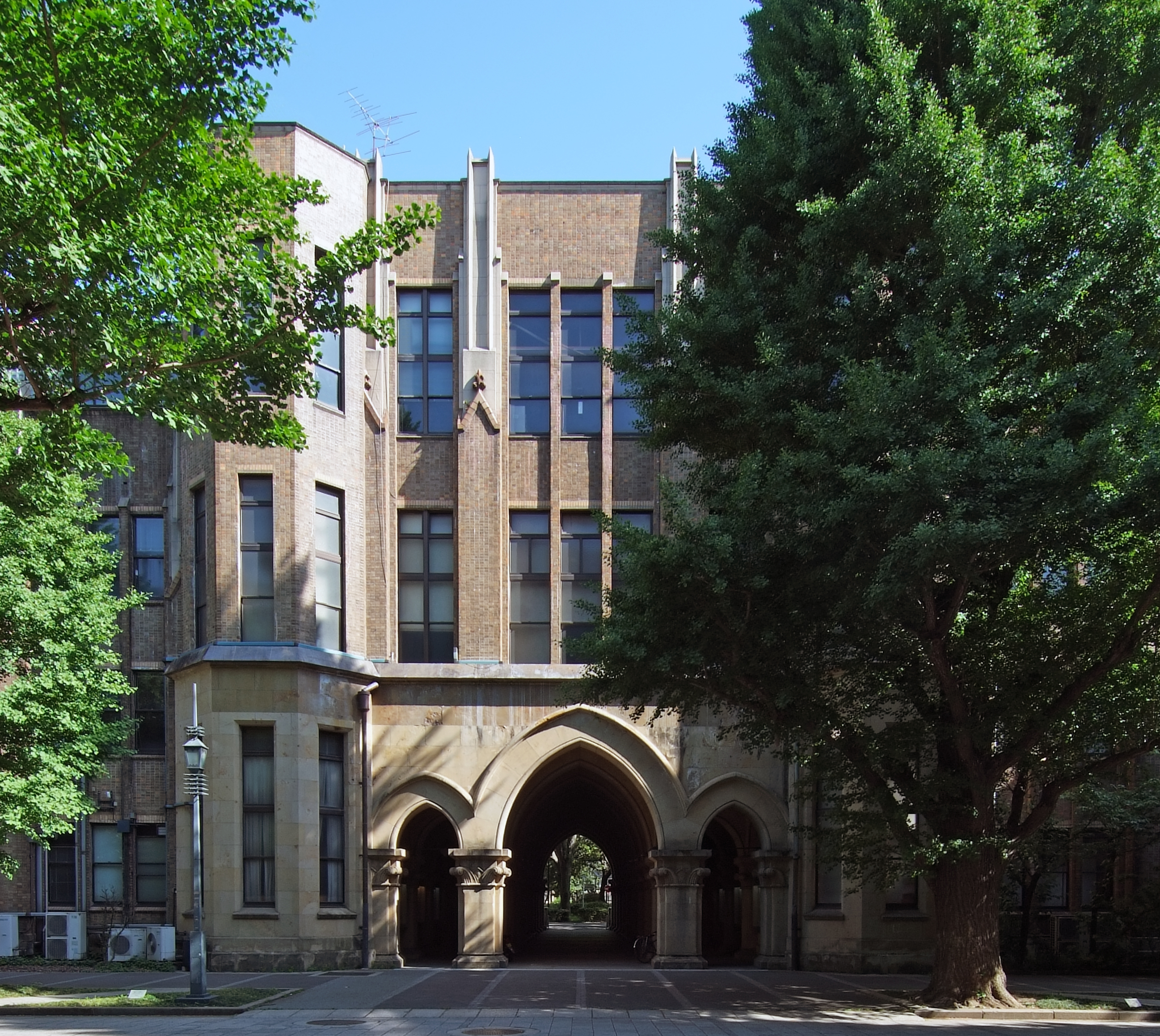
Building one, Shared by the Faculties of Law and Letters

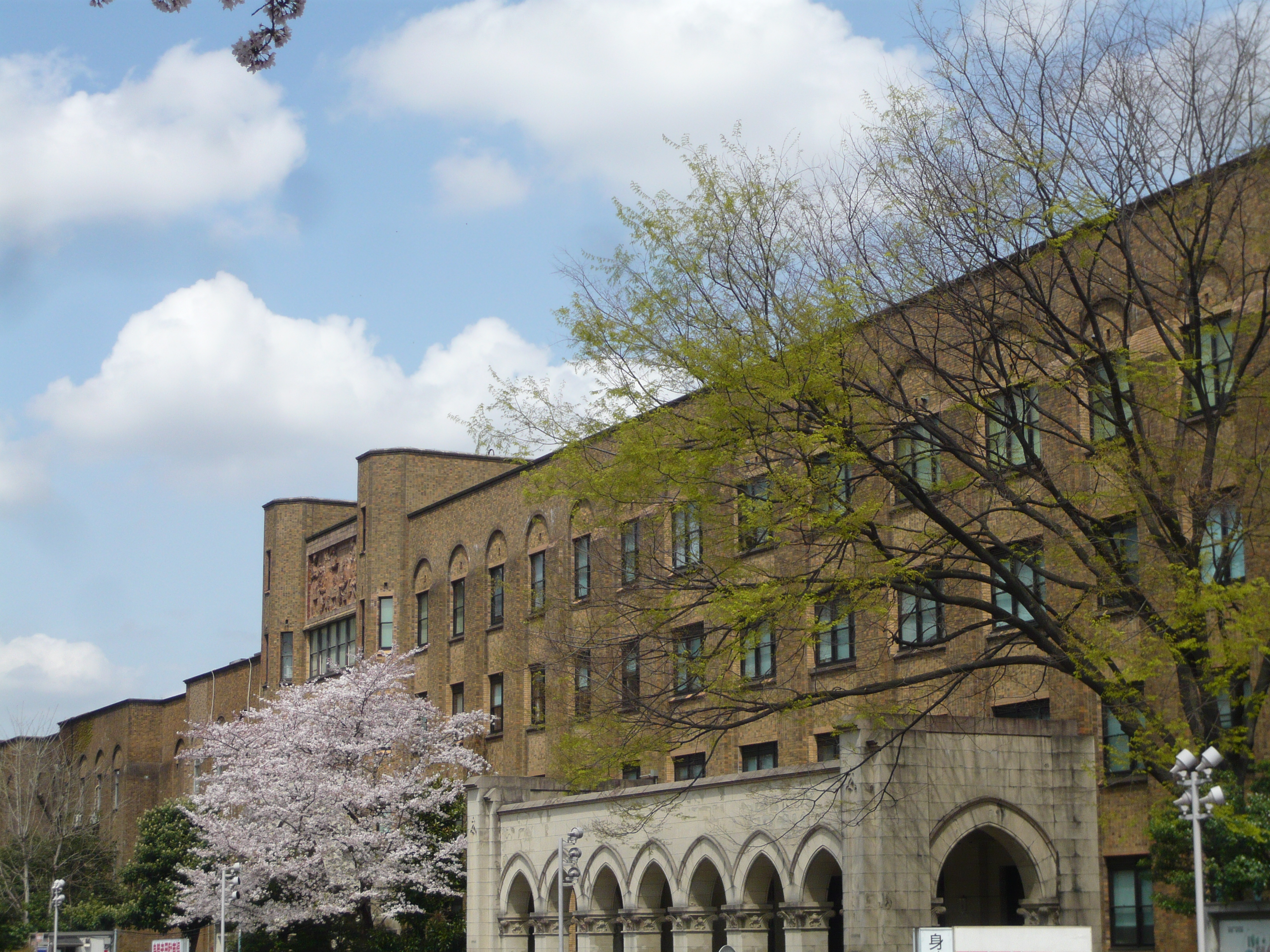
University Hospital

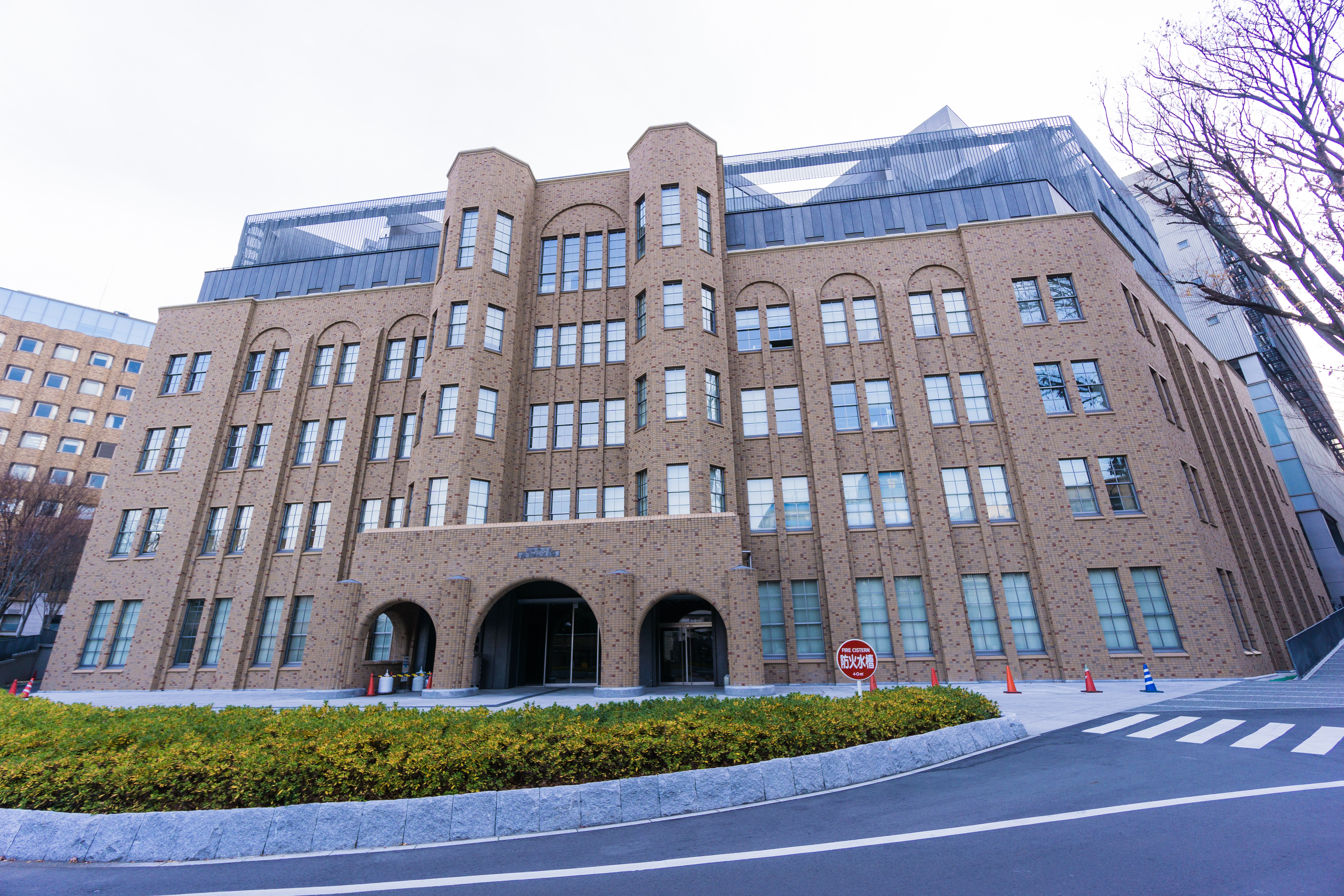
Engineering Building 3

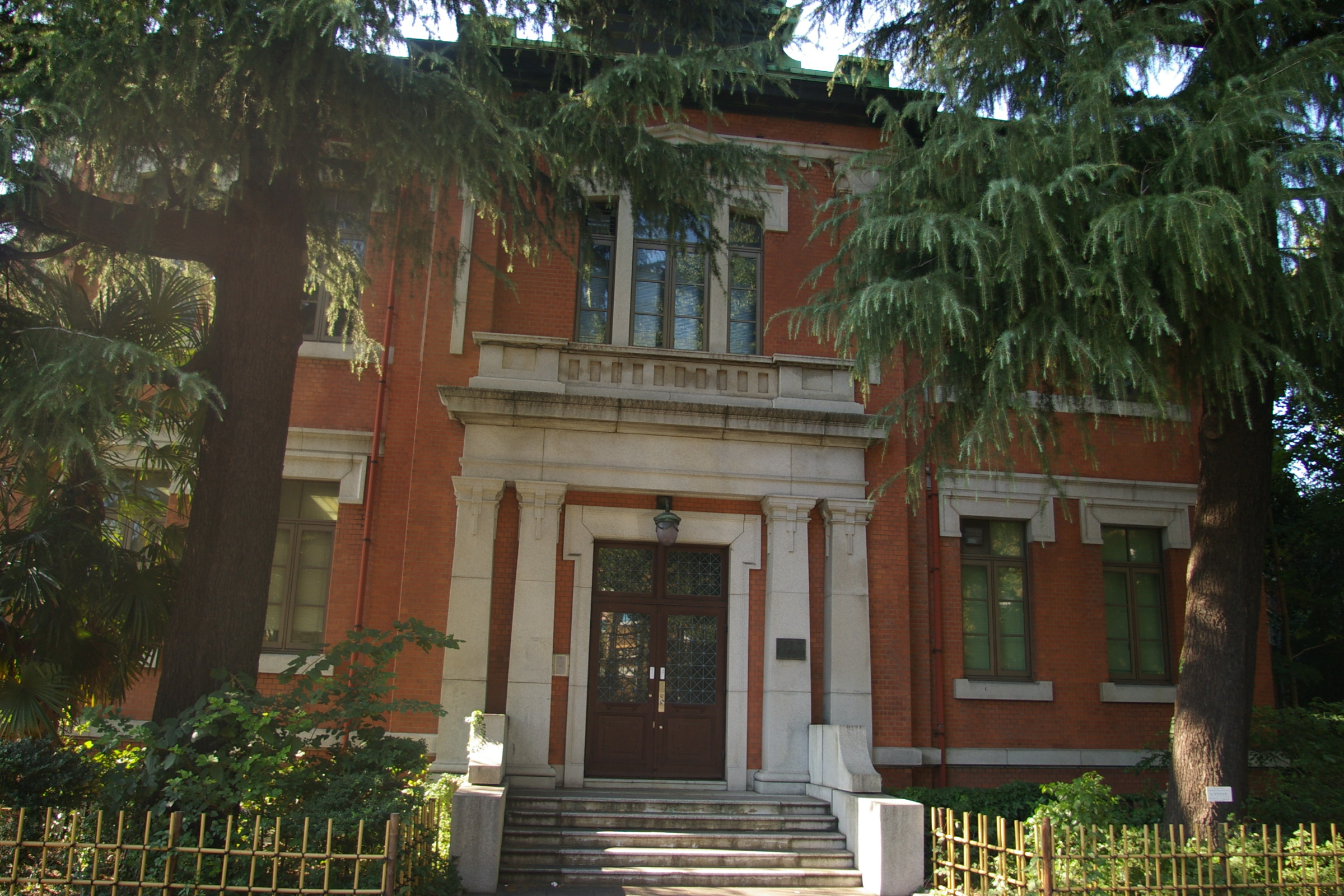
Chemistry East Building

=== Komaba Campus ===
The Komaba Campus, serving as the educational hub for the first two years of undergraduate studies, provides general education to around 6,000 first and second year students. The campus, also home to the Graduate Schools of Arts, Sciences, and Mathematical Sciences, has advanced research facilities. It also provides specialised education for about 450 senior division undergraduate students in the College of Arts and Sciences and 1,400 graduate students across various disciplines. It is served by Komaba-Todaimae Station on the Keio Inokashira line, which is directly connected to the main gate of the campus.

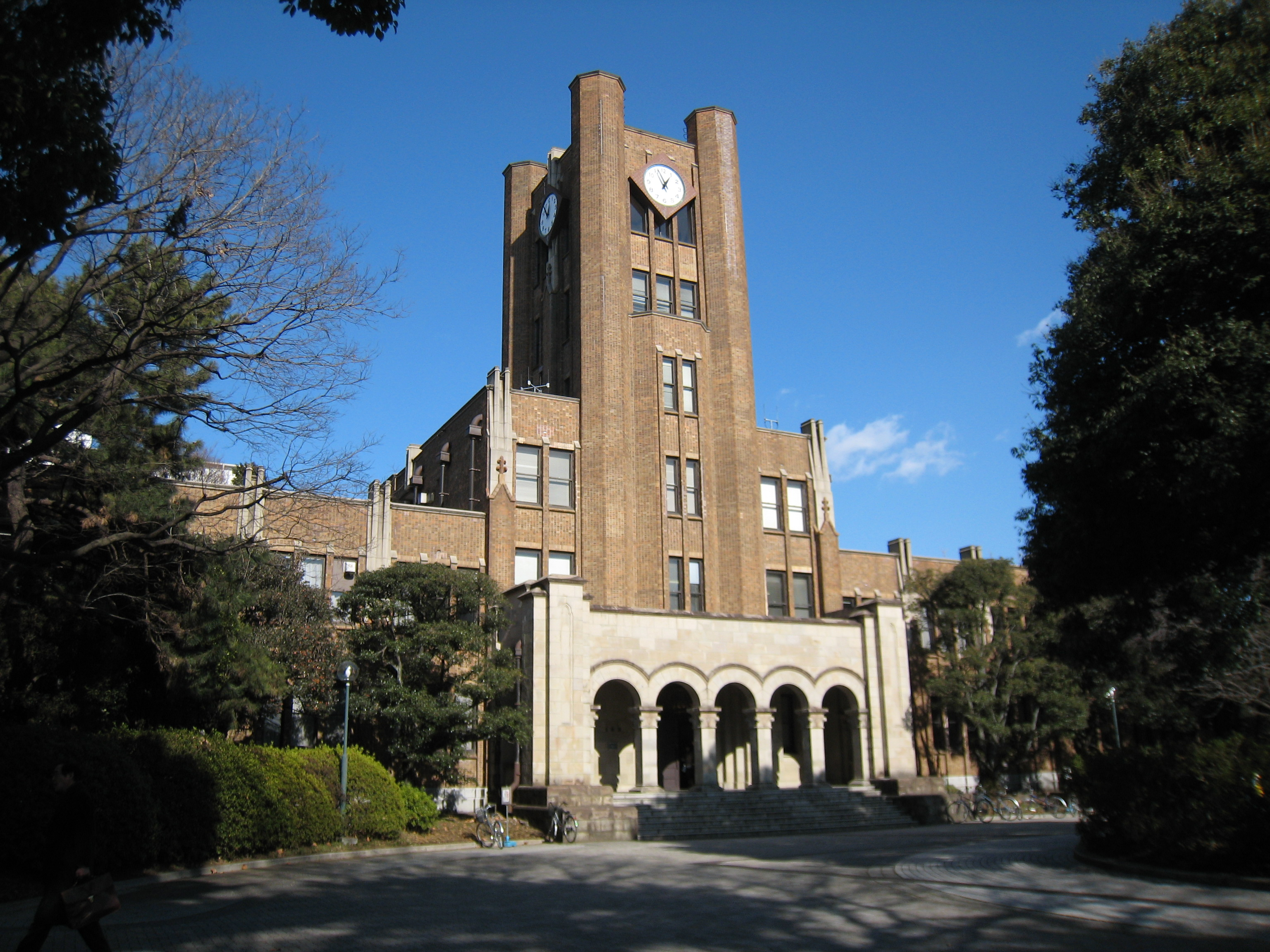
Komaba Campus Building 1

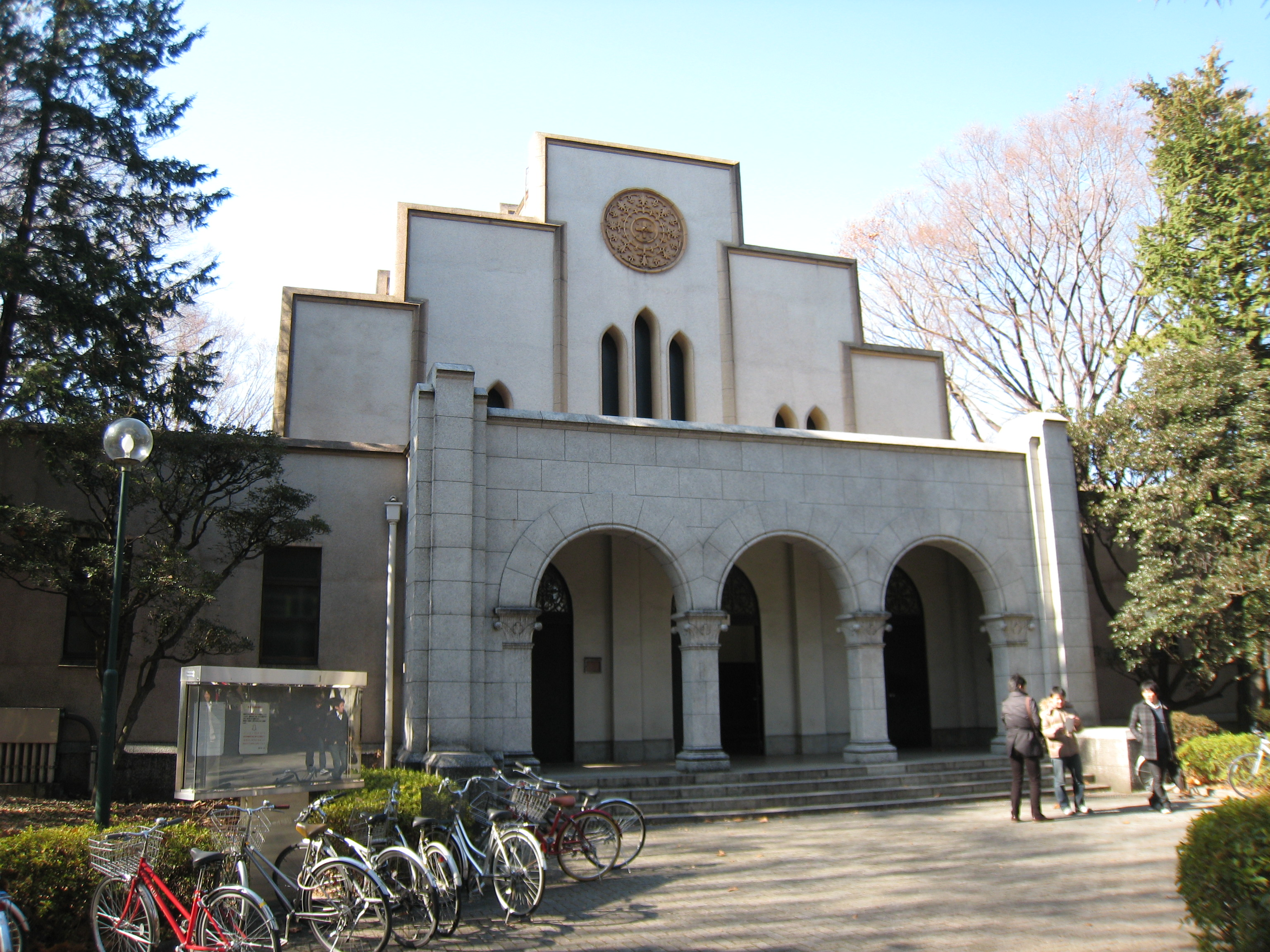
Auditorium 900

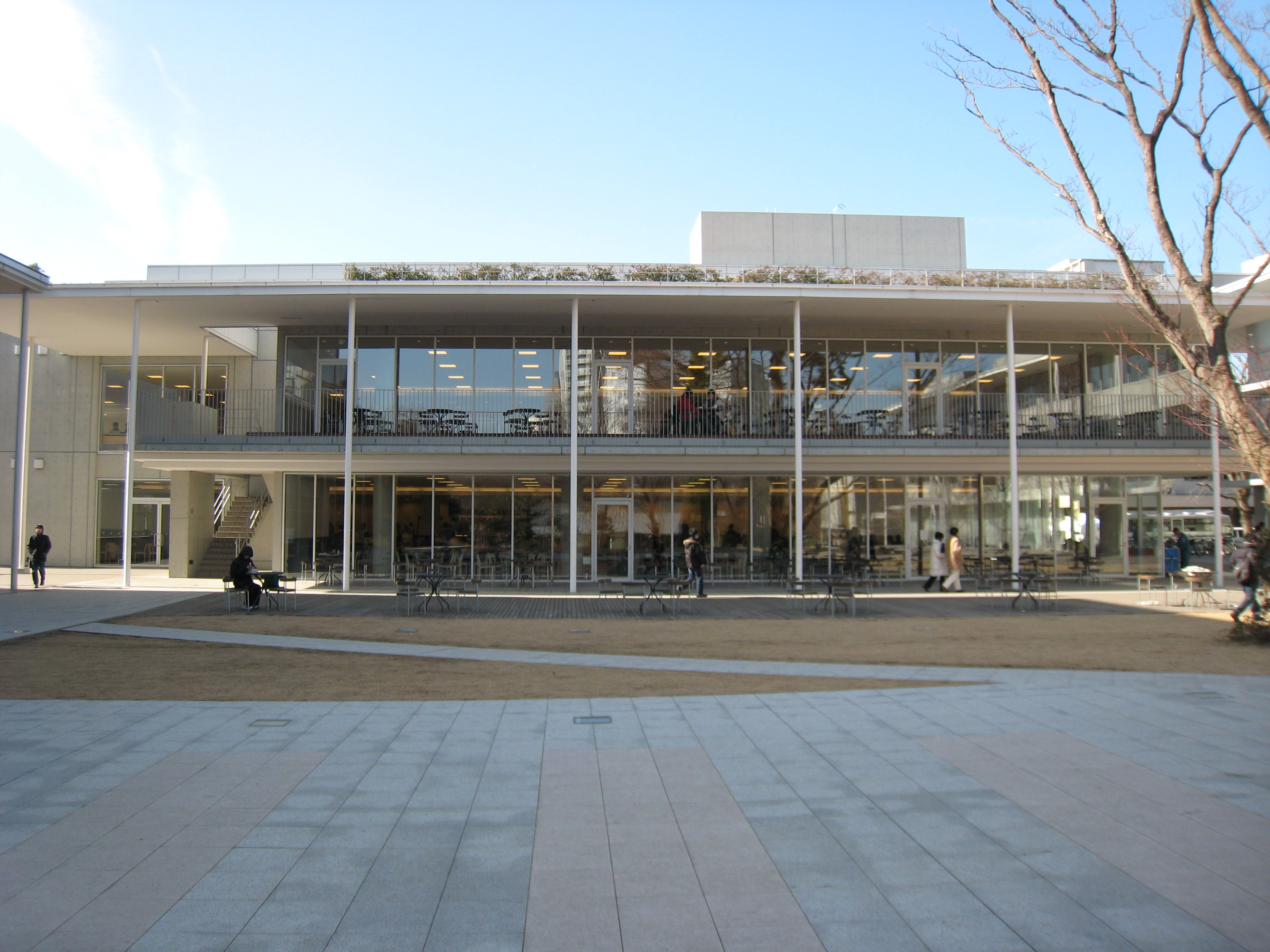
Main Refectory

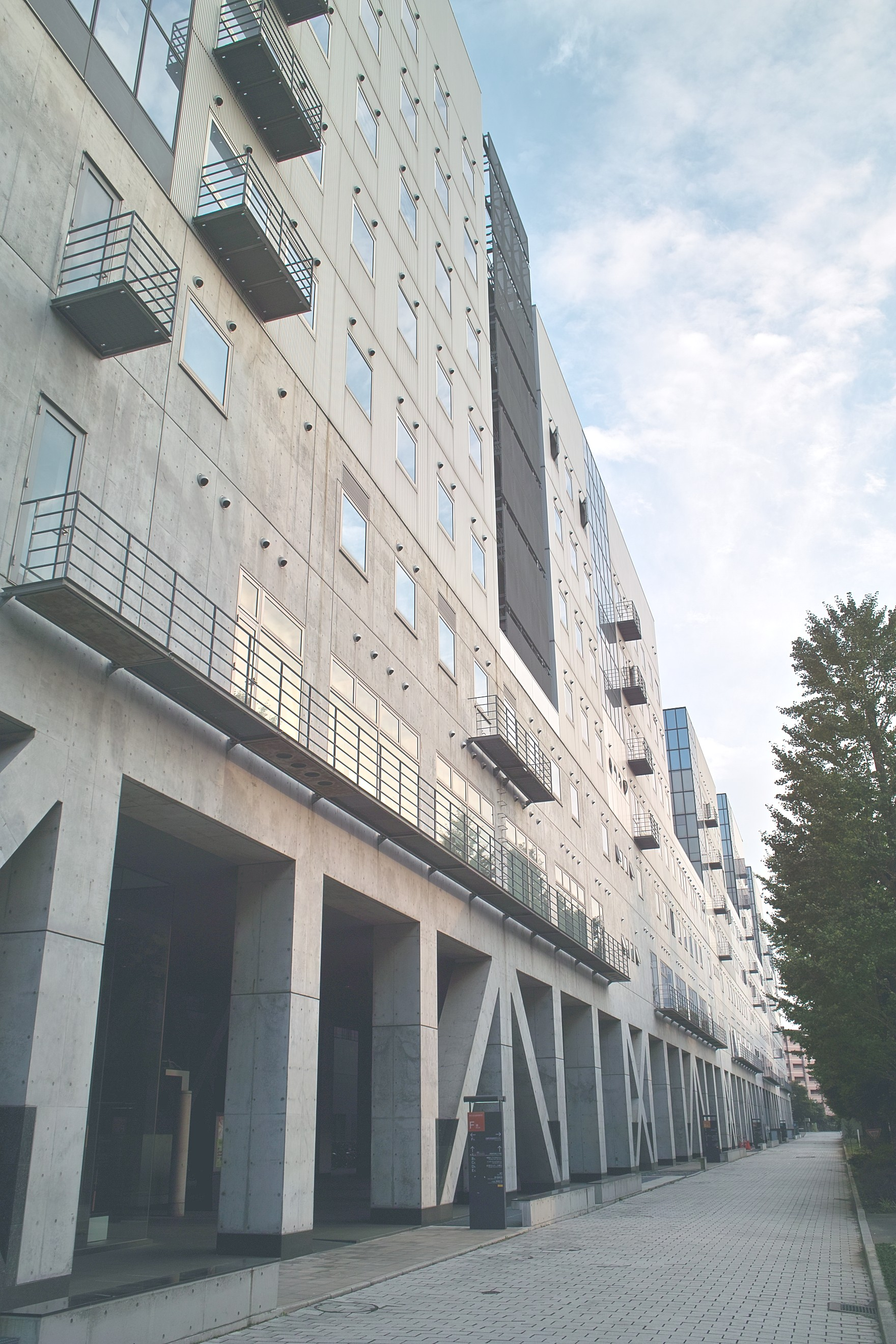
The Institute of Industrial Science

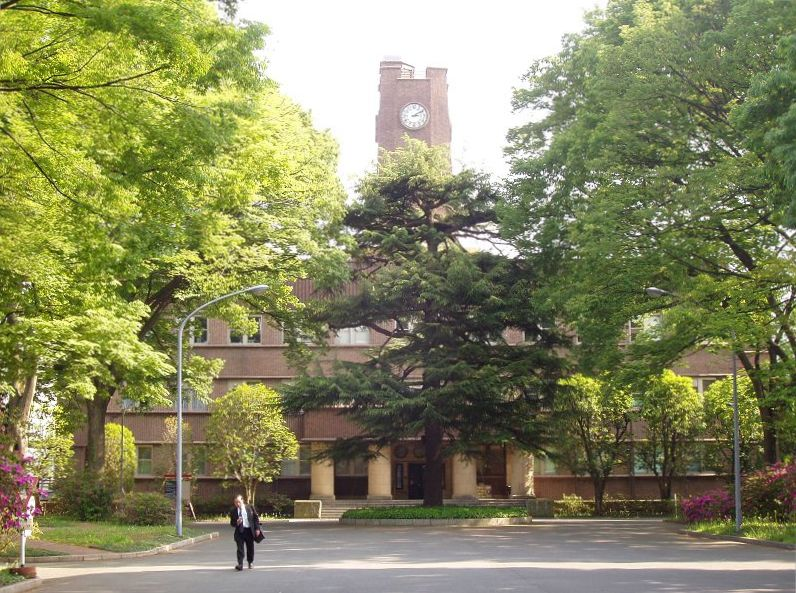
Research Centre for Advanced Science and Technology

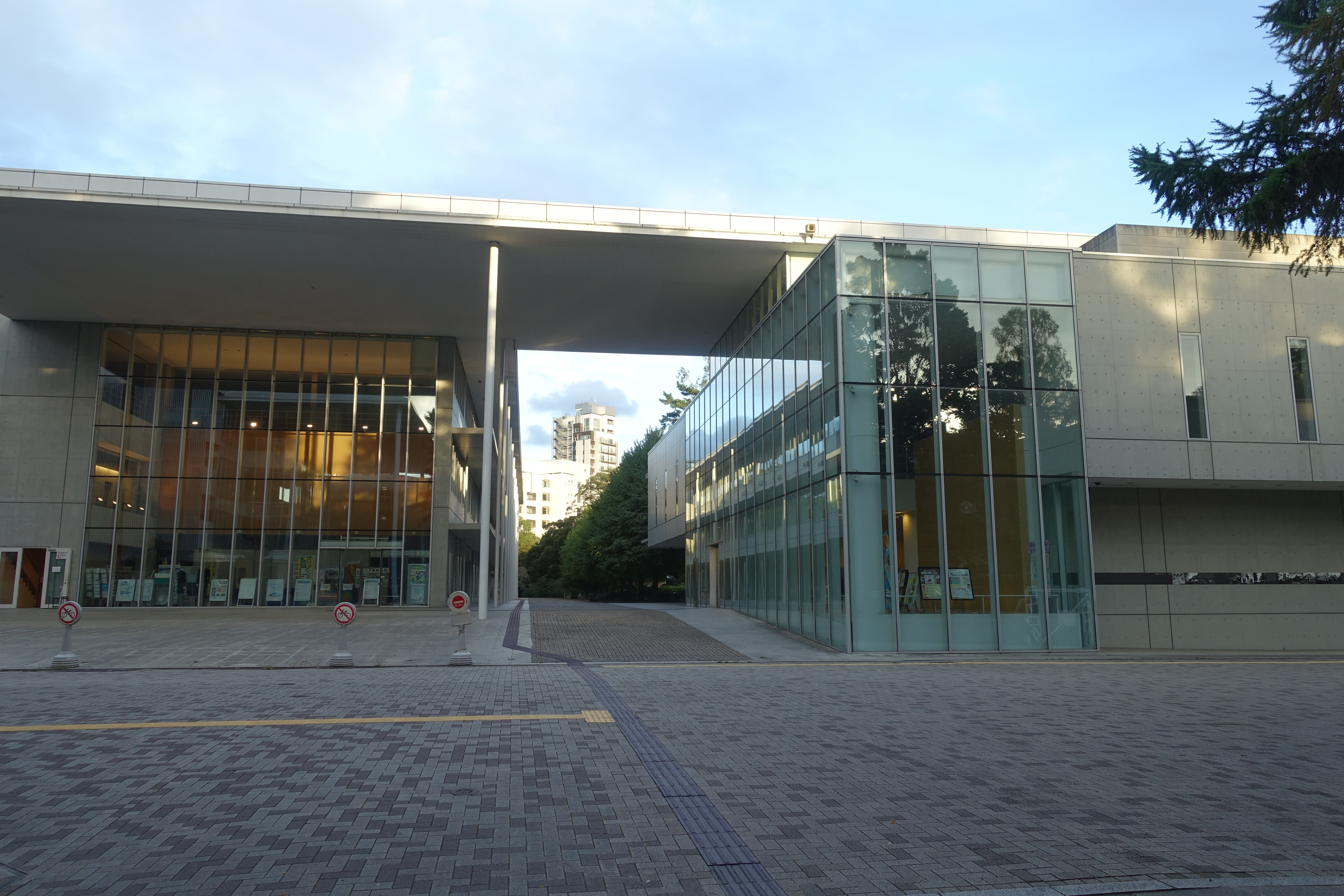
Campus Plaza

=== Kashiwa Campus ===
The Kashiwa Campus is dedicated to postgraduate education and research. It houses the Graduate School of Frontier Sciences along with advanced research institutes such as the Institute for Cosmic Ray Research, the Institute for Solid State Physics, the Kavli Institute for the Physics and Mathematics of the Universe, and the Atmosphere and Ocean Research Institute, equipped with extensive facilities and services.

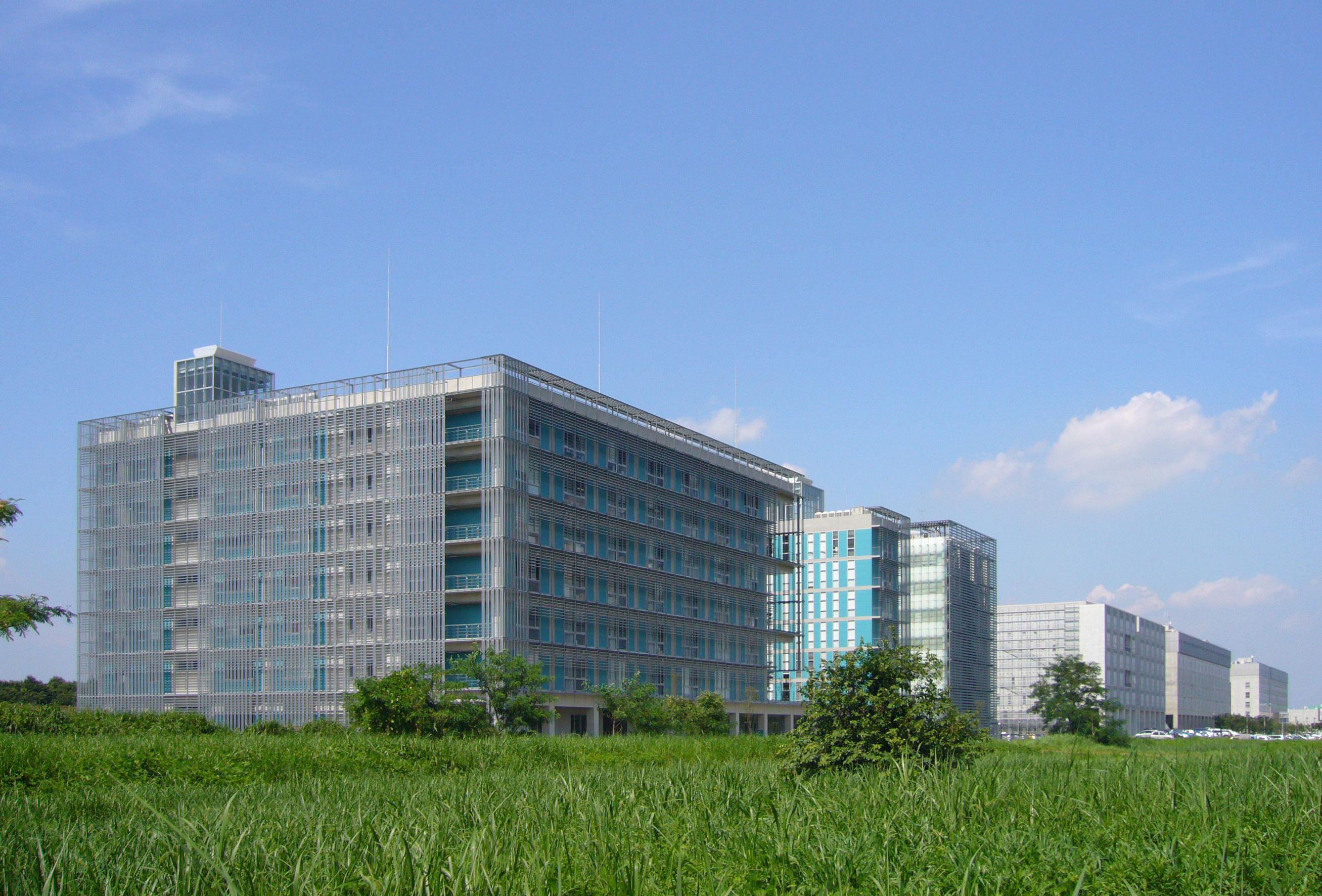
The Kashiwa Campus is built on 100 acres of land.

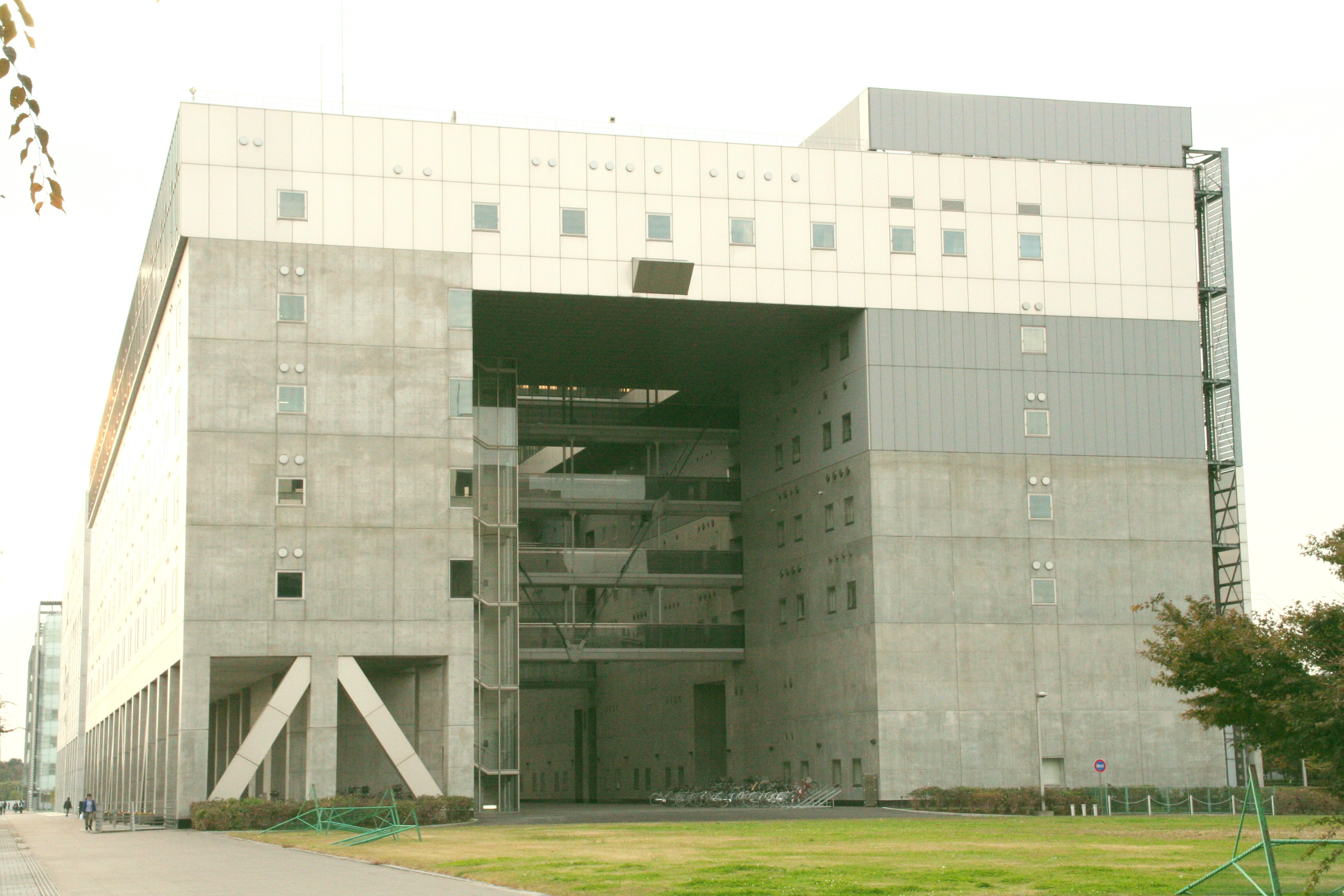
The institute for Cosmic Ray Research (ICRR), Kasiwa

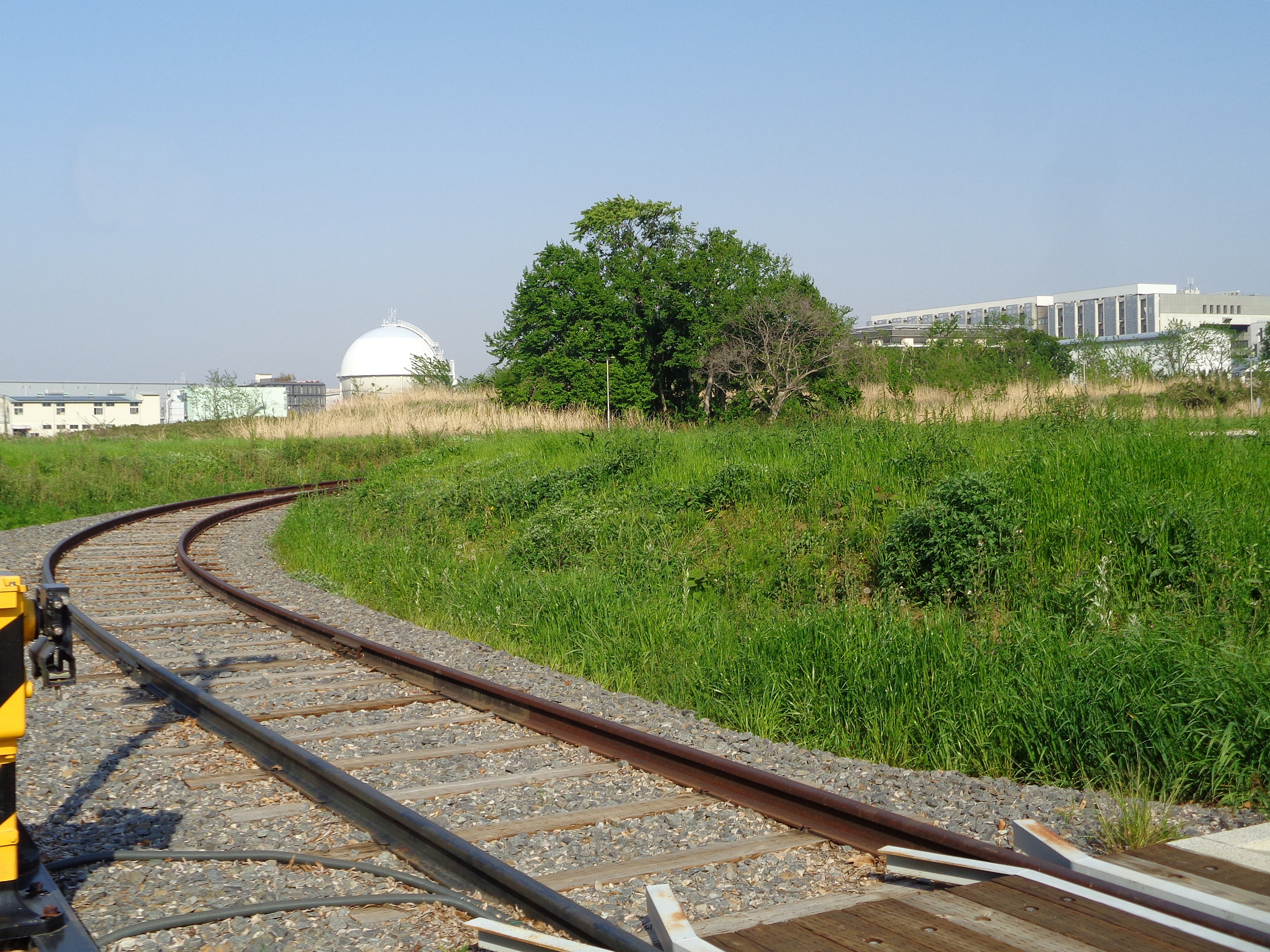
A test track for the new generation of railway technology runs across the campus.

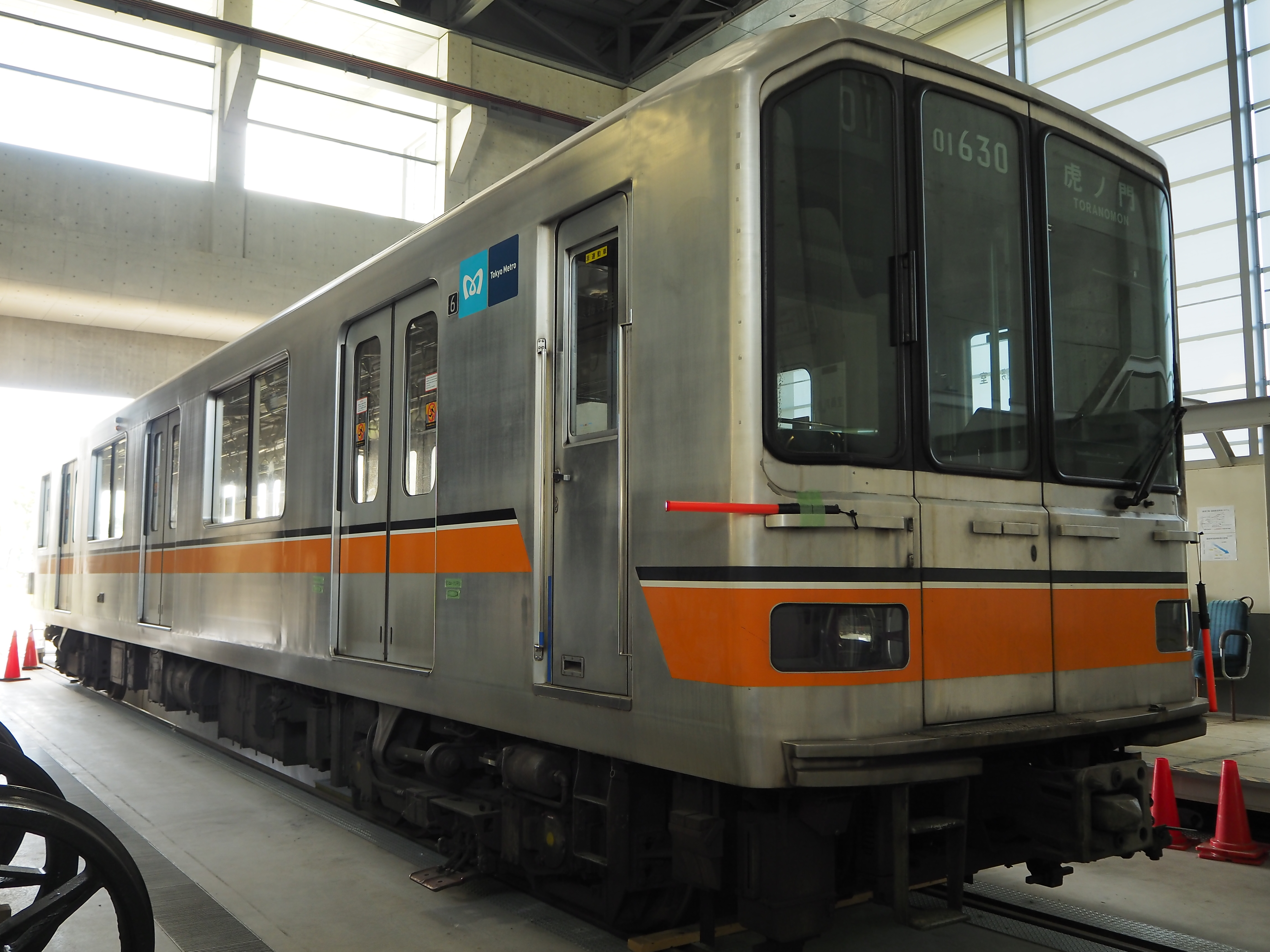
A former Tokyo Metro series 01 coach is used as a railway technology testbed.

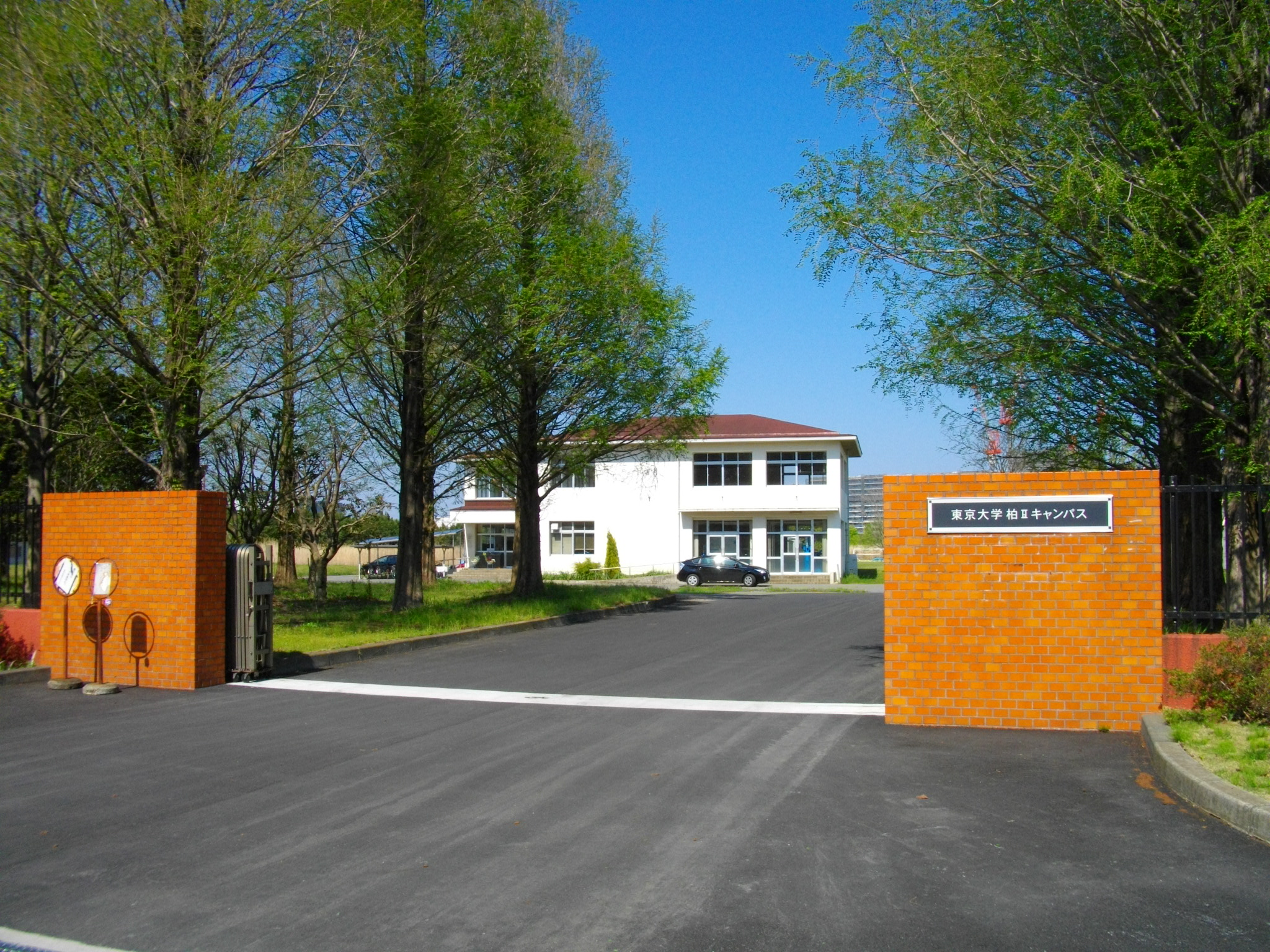
The Kashiwa II Campus (20 acres) houses accommodation and athletic facilities for the students and faculty of the Kashiwa Campus.

=== Shirokanedai Campus ===
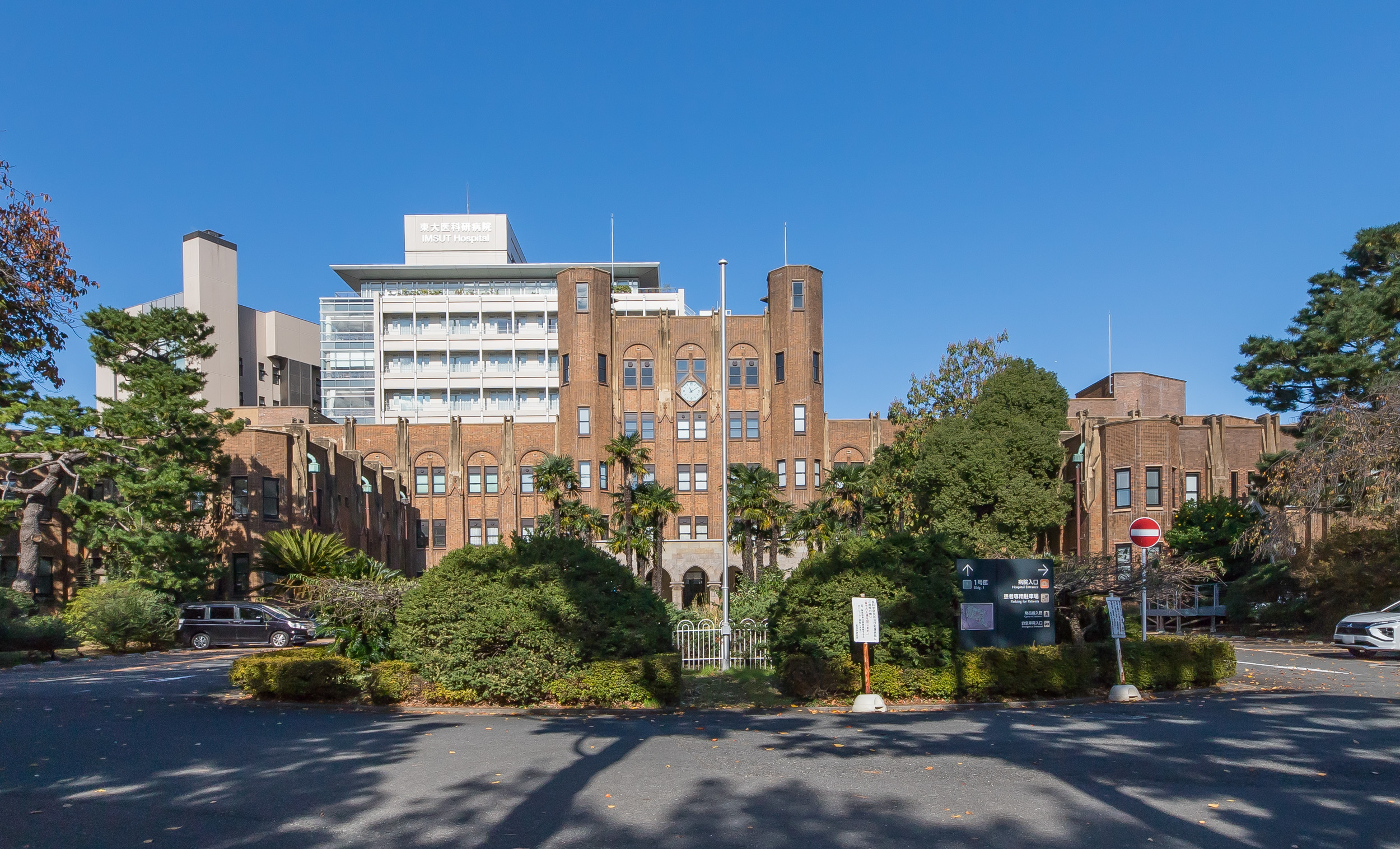
The main building of the Shirokanedai Campus

The relatively small Shirokanedai Campus hosts the Institute of Medical Science, which is entirely dedicated to postgraduate studies. The institute was originally established by Shibasaburo Kitasato and moved to the current site in Shirokanedai, Minato in 1906. The campus is focused on genome research, including among its research groups the Human Genome Center, which has at its disposal the largest supercomputer in the field. The main building of the building was designed by Yoshikazu Uchida in a style matching that of the adjacent Institute of Public Health, which is now opened to the public as Minato Local History Museum.

=== Other sites ===
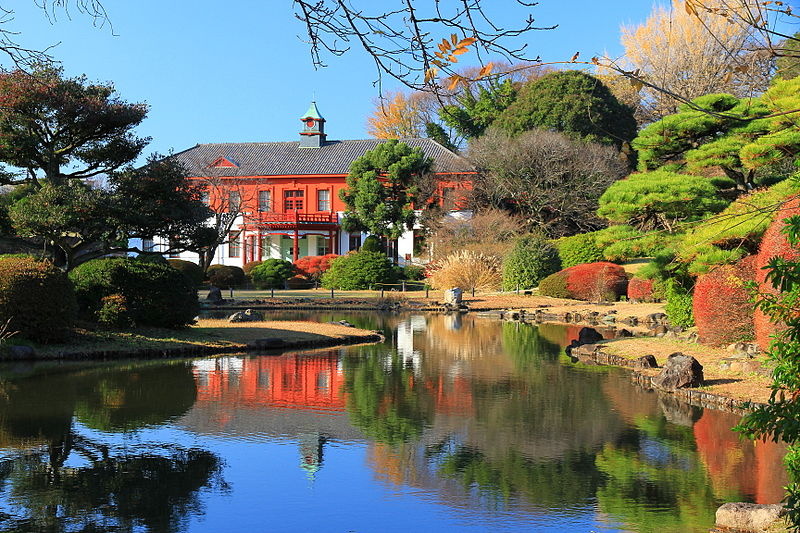
Koishikawa Botanical Garden, Tokyo

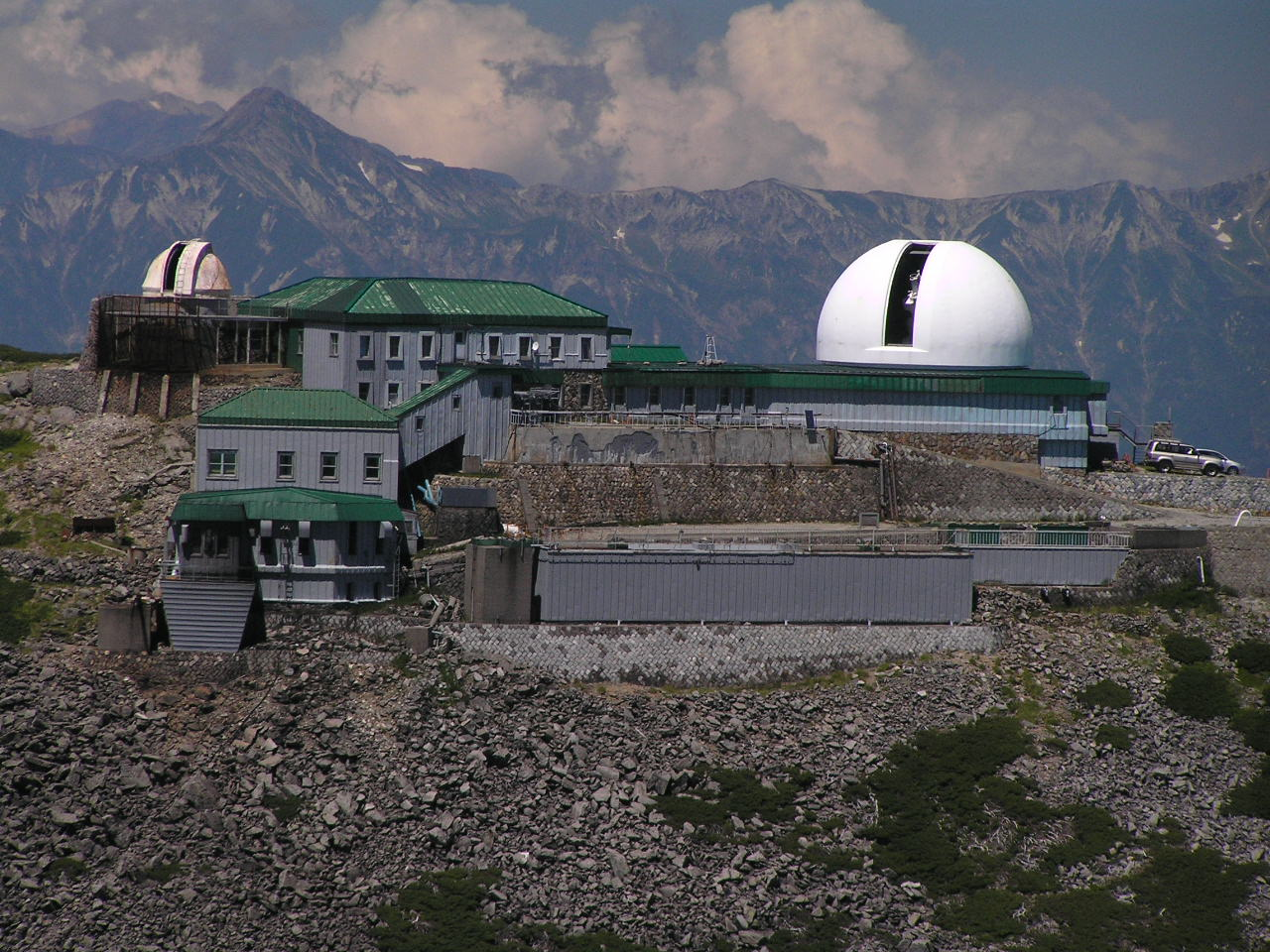
Norikura Solar Observatory

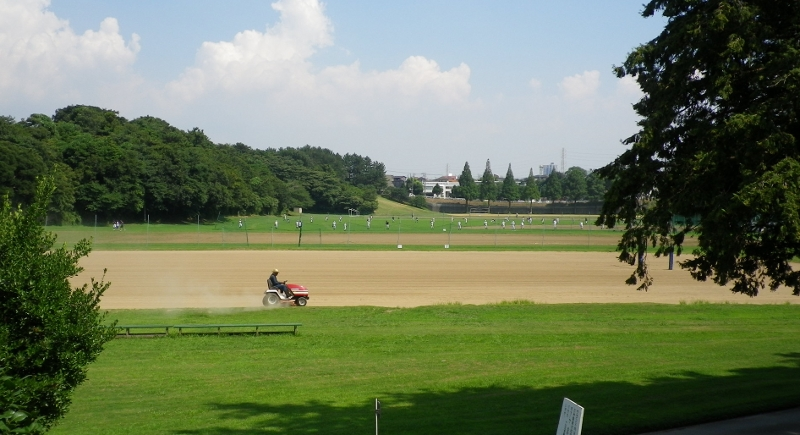
Kemigawa Athletic Ground, Chiba

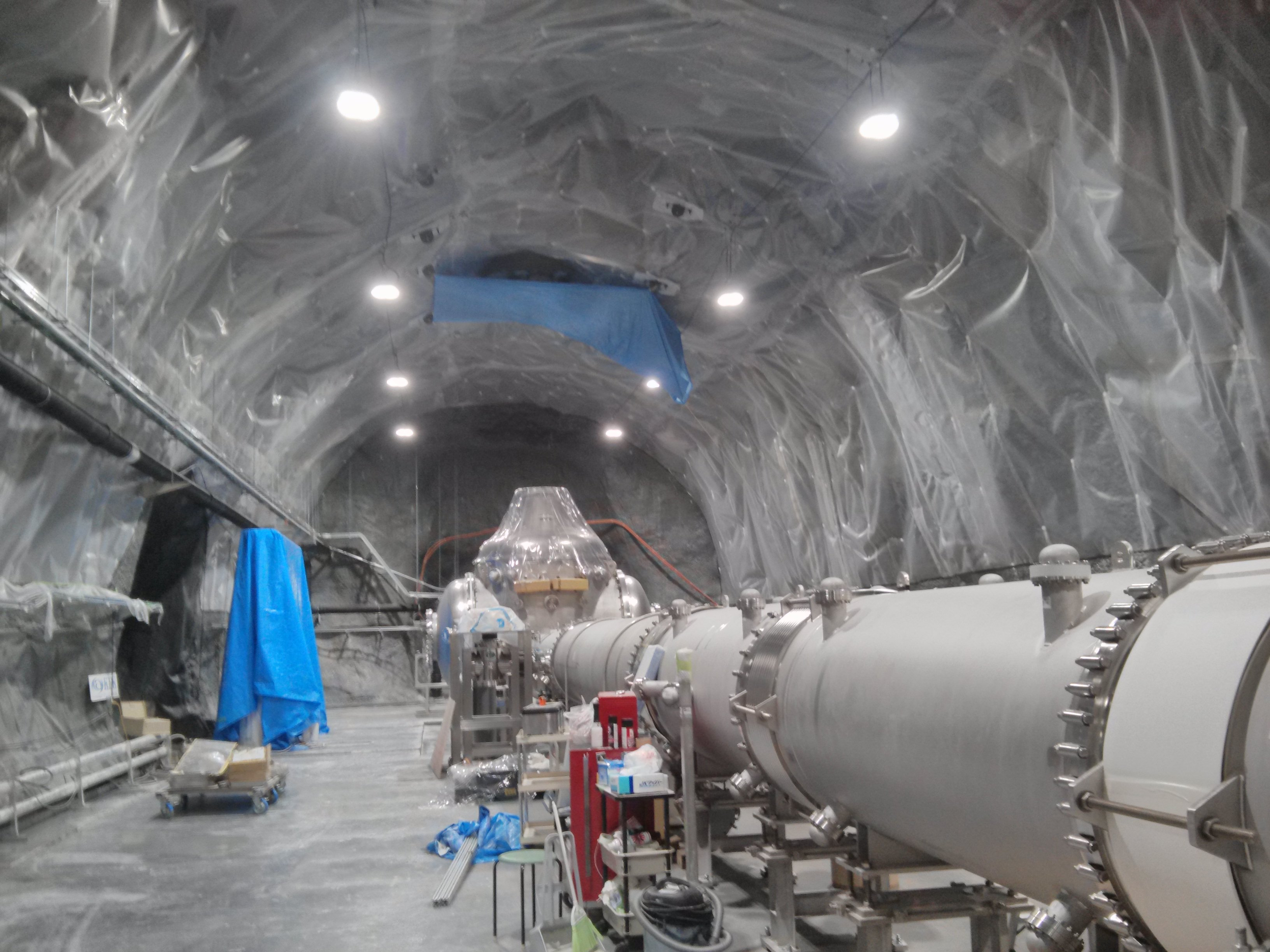
KAGRA gravitational wave telescope, Gifu

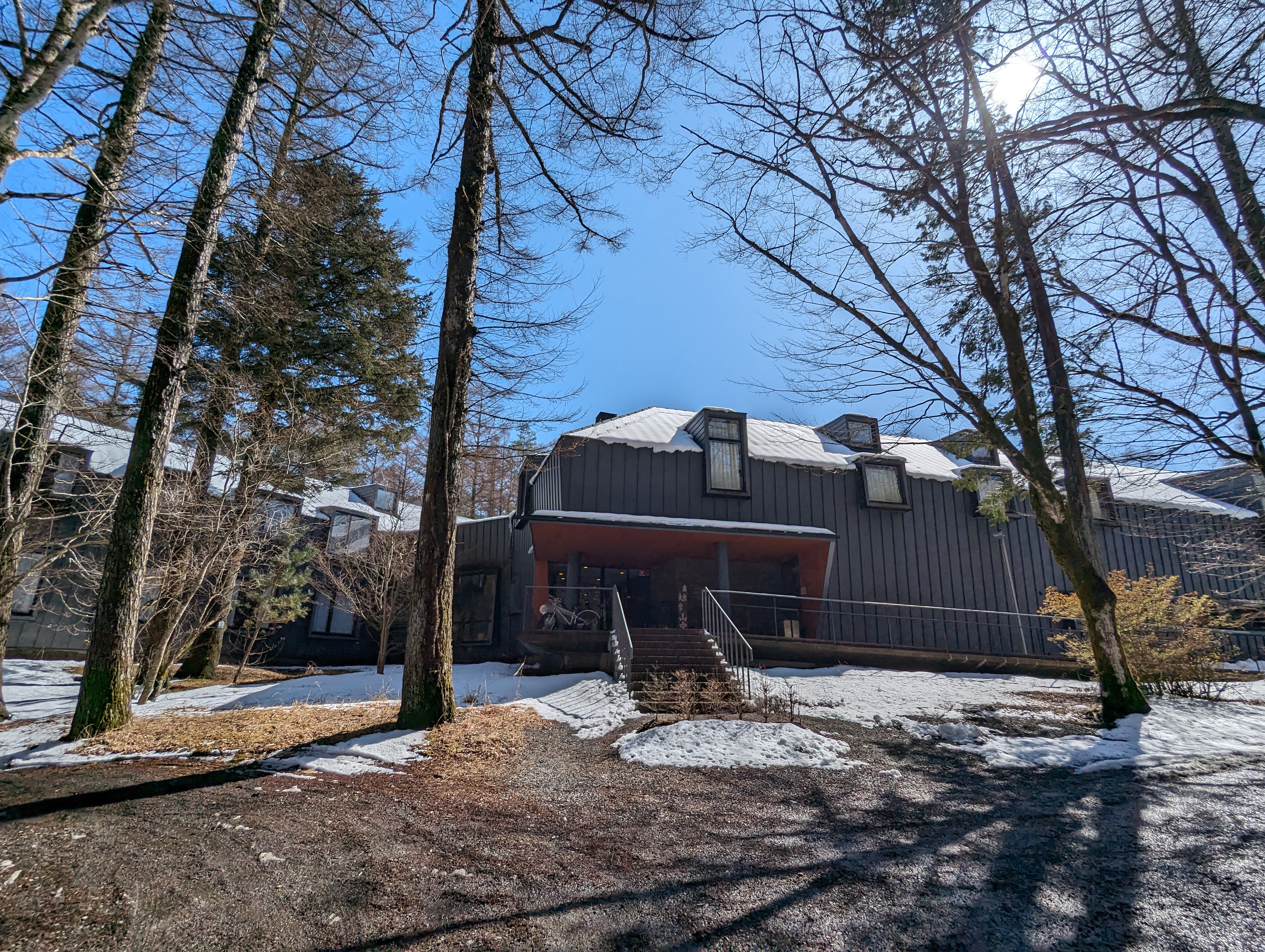
Yamanaka Seminar House, Yamanashi

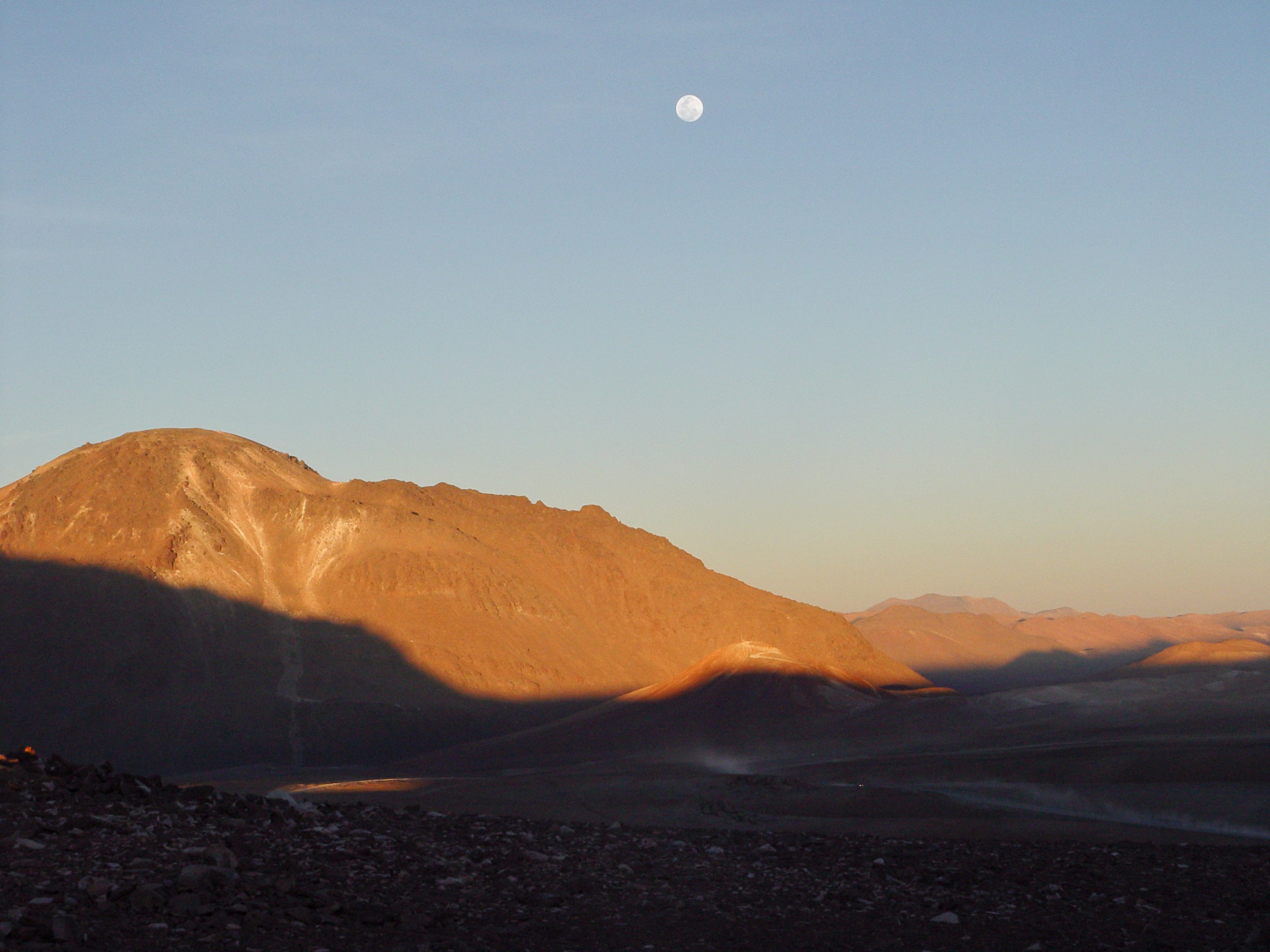
Atacama Observatory, Mount Chajnator, Chile

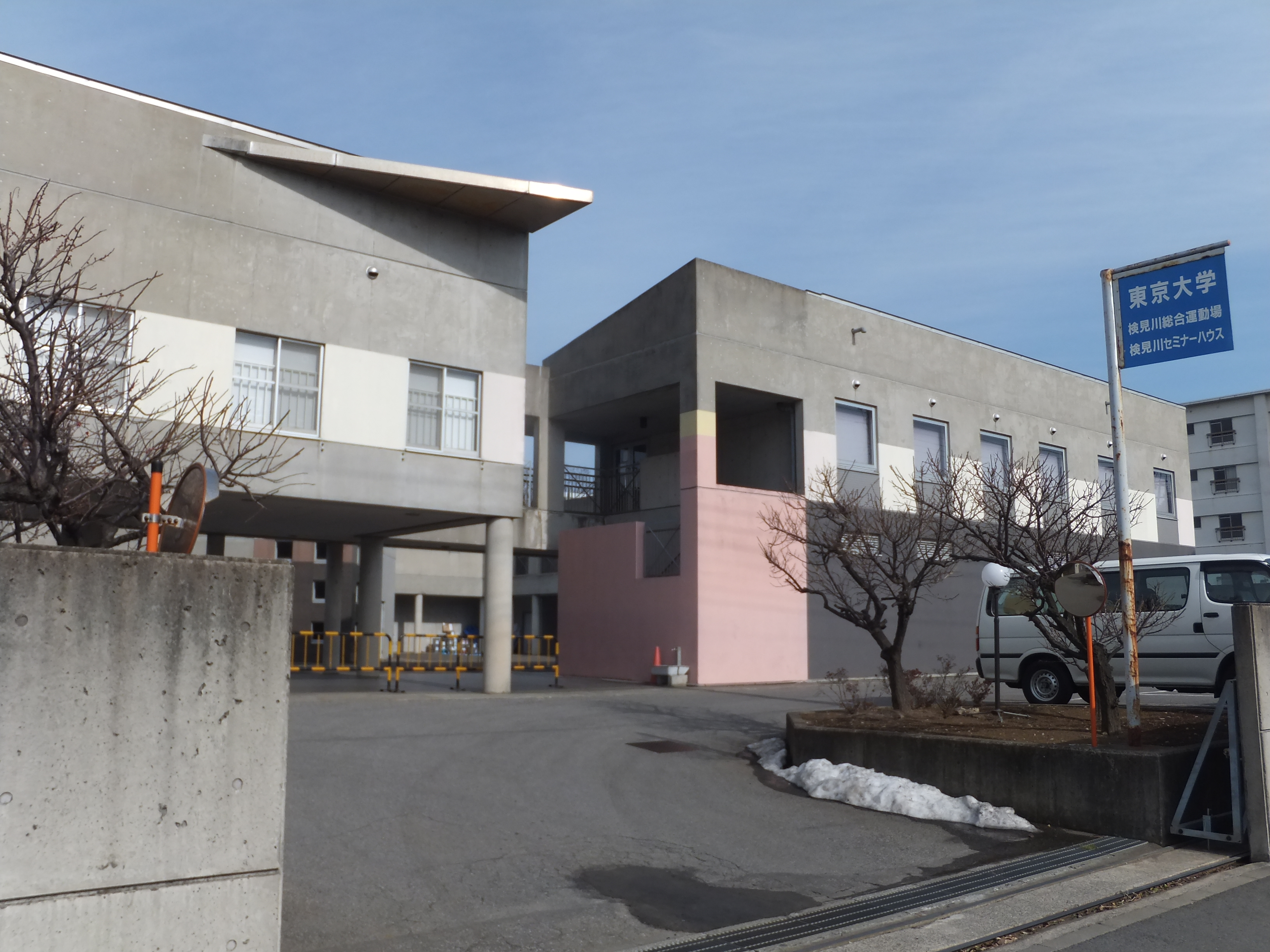
Kemigawa Seminar House, Chiba

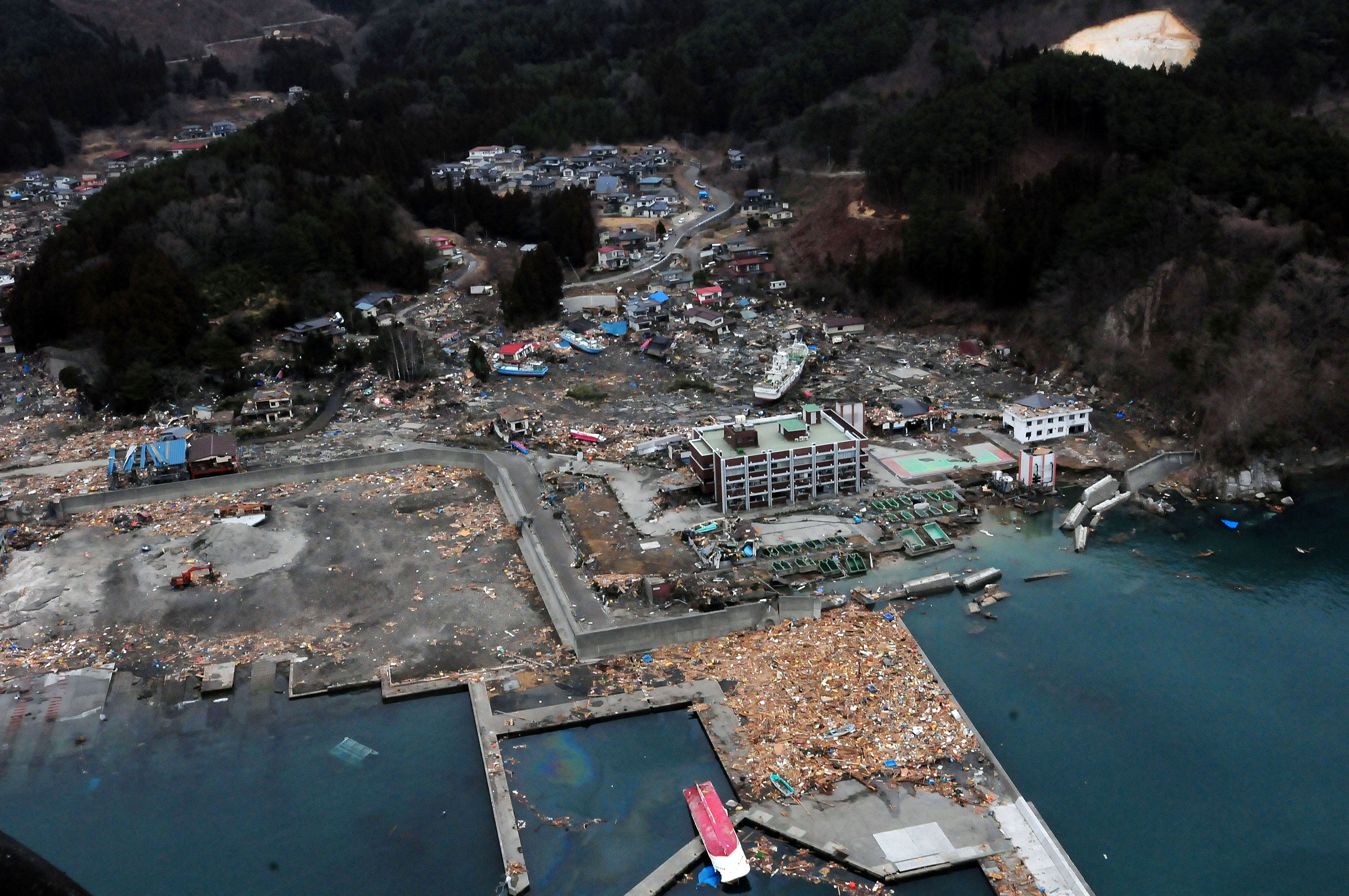
Atmosphere and Ocean Research Institute, Iwate, after the Tsunami of 11 March 2011

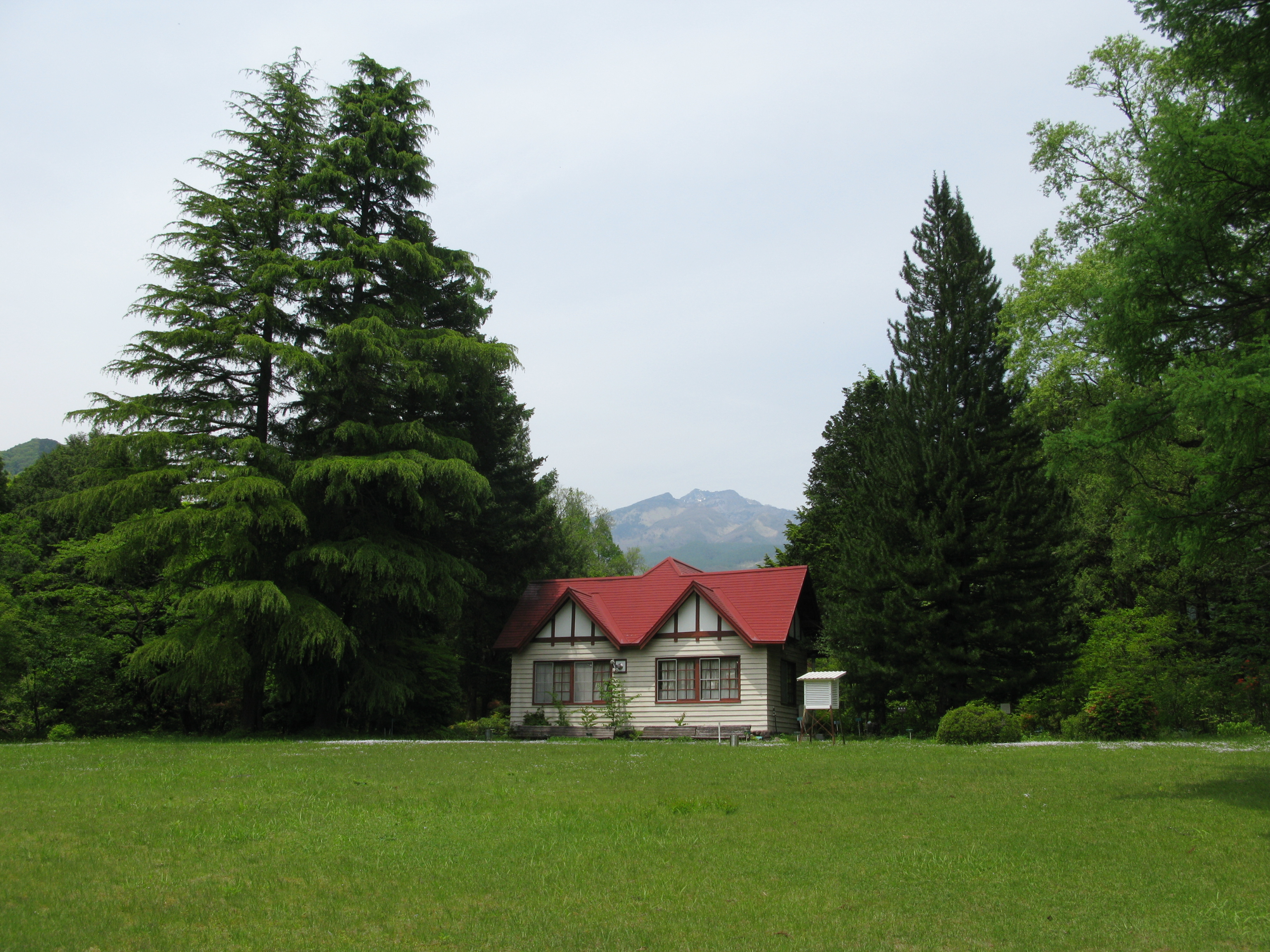
Nikko Botanical Garden, Tochigi

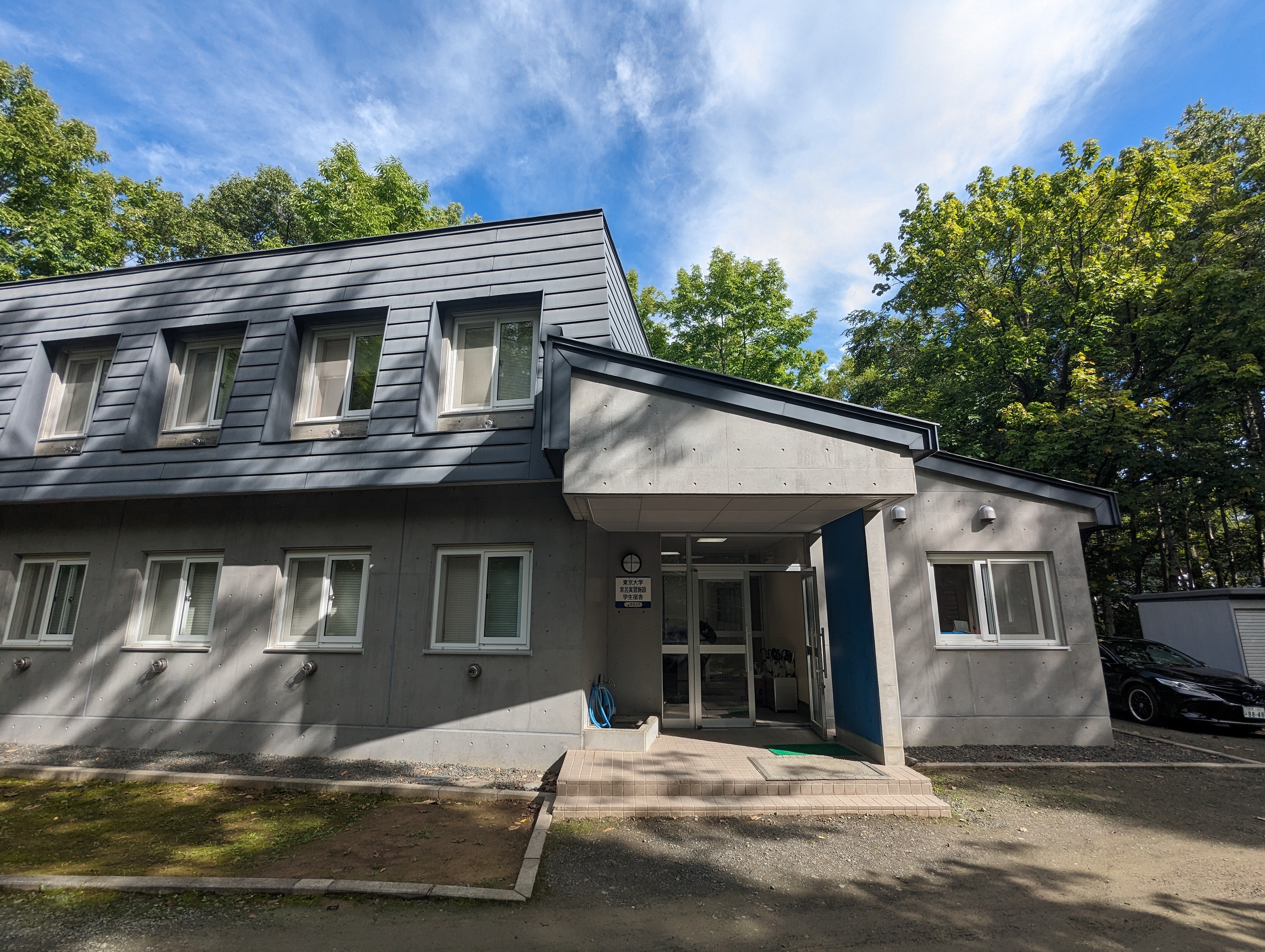
Tokoro Archaeological Centre, Tokoro, Hokkaido

== Alumni ==
Throughout its history as a modern university since 1877, a considerable number of UTokyo alumni have attained prominence in both academic and other fields. As of 2024, UTokyo's alumni and faculty include 17 of Japan's 64 prime ministers, 22 Nobel Prize laureates, seven astronauts, and a Fields Medalist. Additionally, UTokyo alumni have founded some of Japan's largest companies, such as Toyota and Hitachi. UTokyo alumni also hold chief executive positions in approximately a quarter of the Nikkei 225 companies (47 in 2014), a fifth of the total seats in the National Diet (139 out of 713 in 2023), more than half of the prefectural governorships (27 out of 47 in 2023), and about two thirds of the justiceships at the Supreme Court of Japan (11 out of 15 in 2024).

Of the 22 Nobel Prize winners affiliated with UTokyo in some way, thirteen have earned degrees from the institution, with prizes won in five of the six categories, except for economics. This is the largest number among all universities in Asia. The remainder consists of: Hideki Yukawa (Physics, 1949), who served as a professor from 1942 for a few years; Charles H. Townes (Physics, 1964), who was a visiting scholar for two years in the 1950s; Wolfgang Paul (Physics, 1989), who was a visiting lecturer in 1978; Anthony James Leggett (Physics, 2003), who was a visiting professor for two years beginning in 1972; Gérard Mourou, who was a visiting professor in 1994; Tasuku Honjo (Physiology or Medicine, 2018), who was an assistant professor for six years beginning in 1974; Harry Markowitz (Economics, 1990) and Leonid Hurwicz (Economics, 2007), both of whom served as visiting professors; Francis Halzen (Physics, 2026), who was an fellow of the Japan Society for the Promotion of Science, the Institute for Cosmic Ray Research at the University of Tokyo in 1983 and 1987;

=== Law and politics ===
Japanese Prime Ministers who attended the University of Tokyo

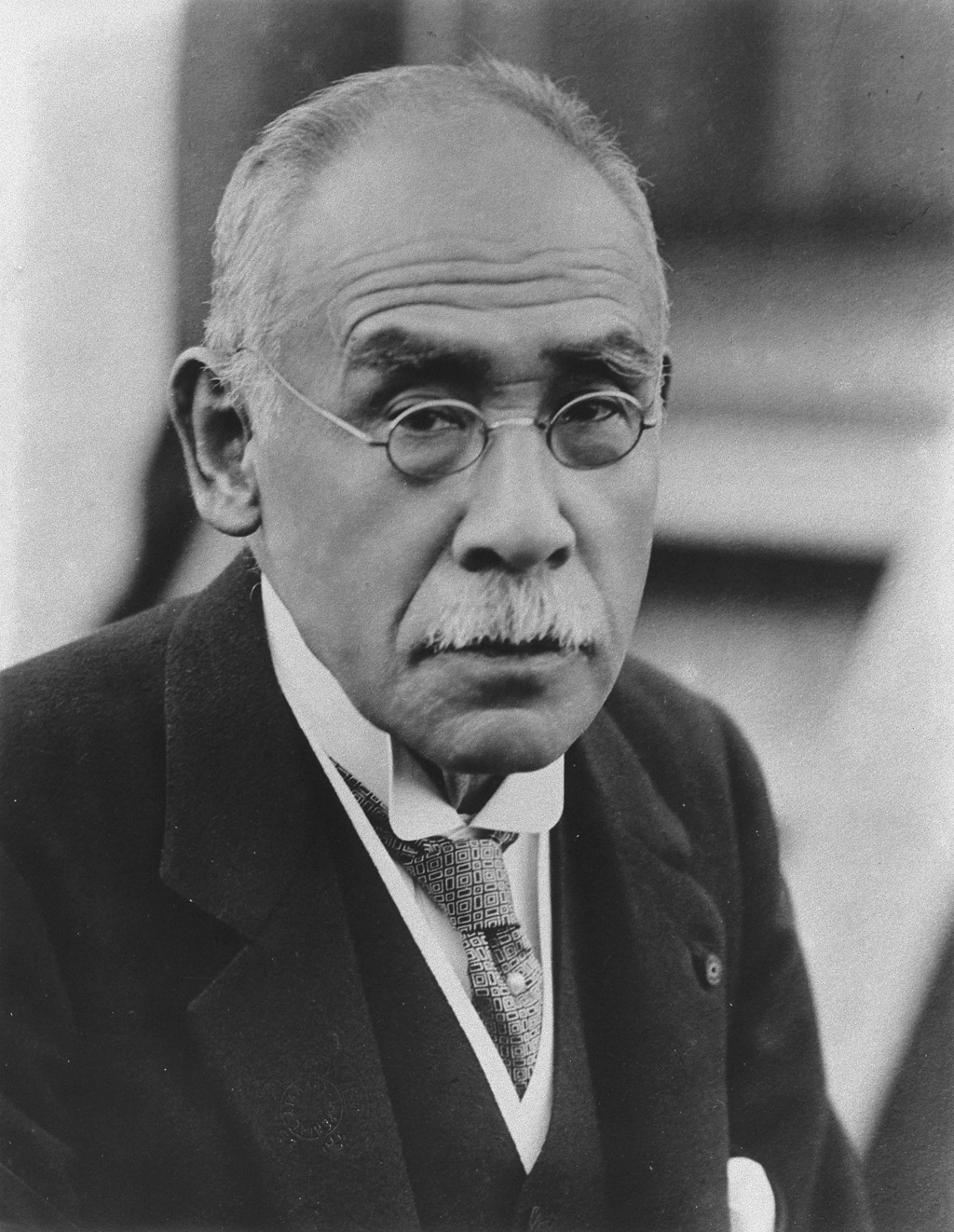
Takaaki Kato

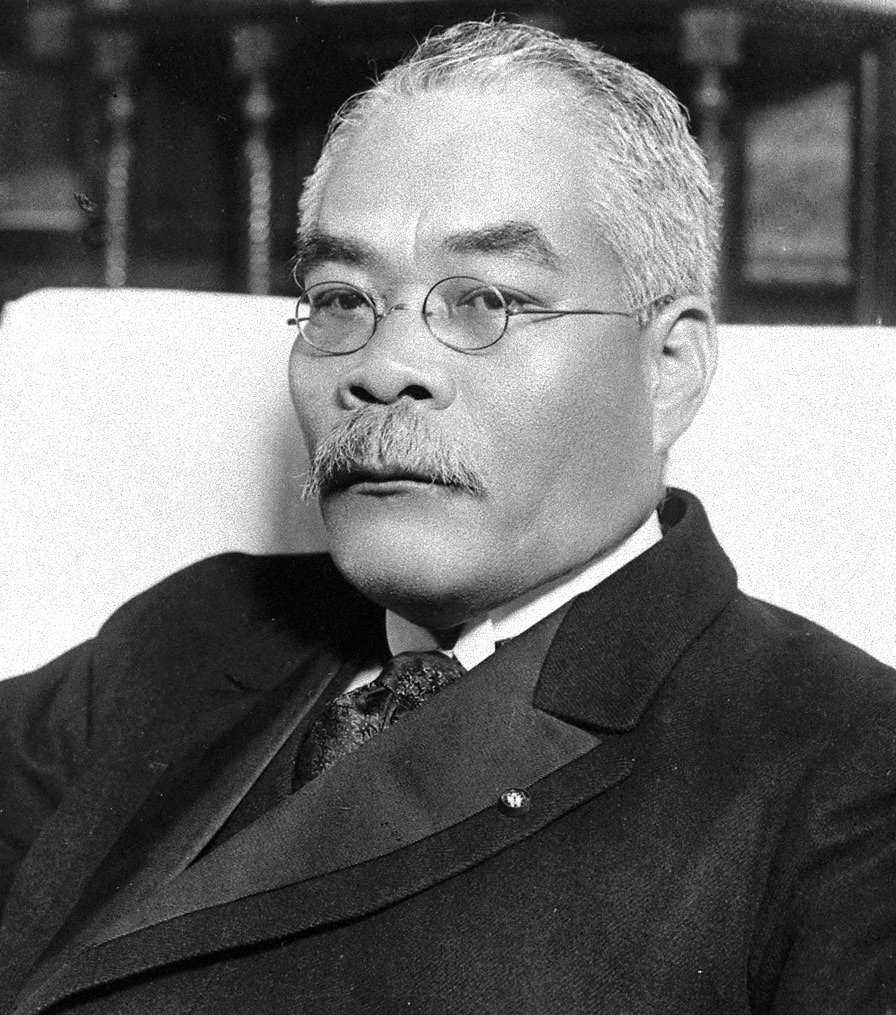
Osachi Hamaguchi

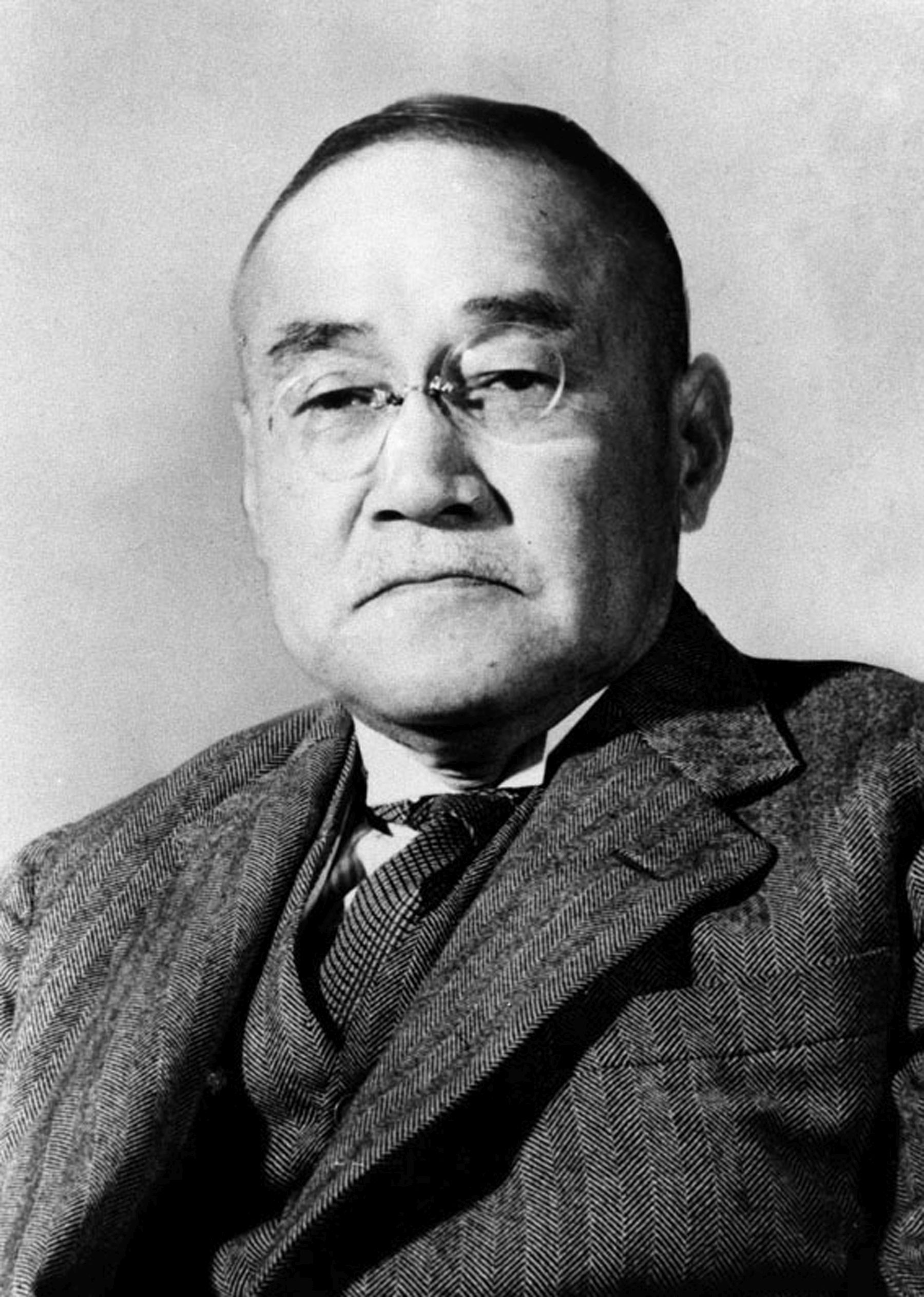
Shigeru Yoshida

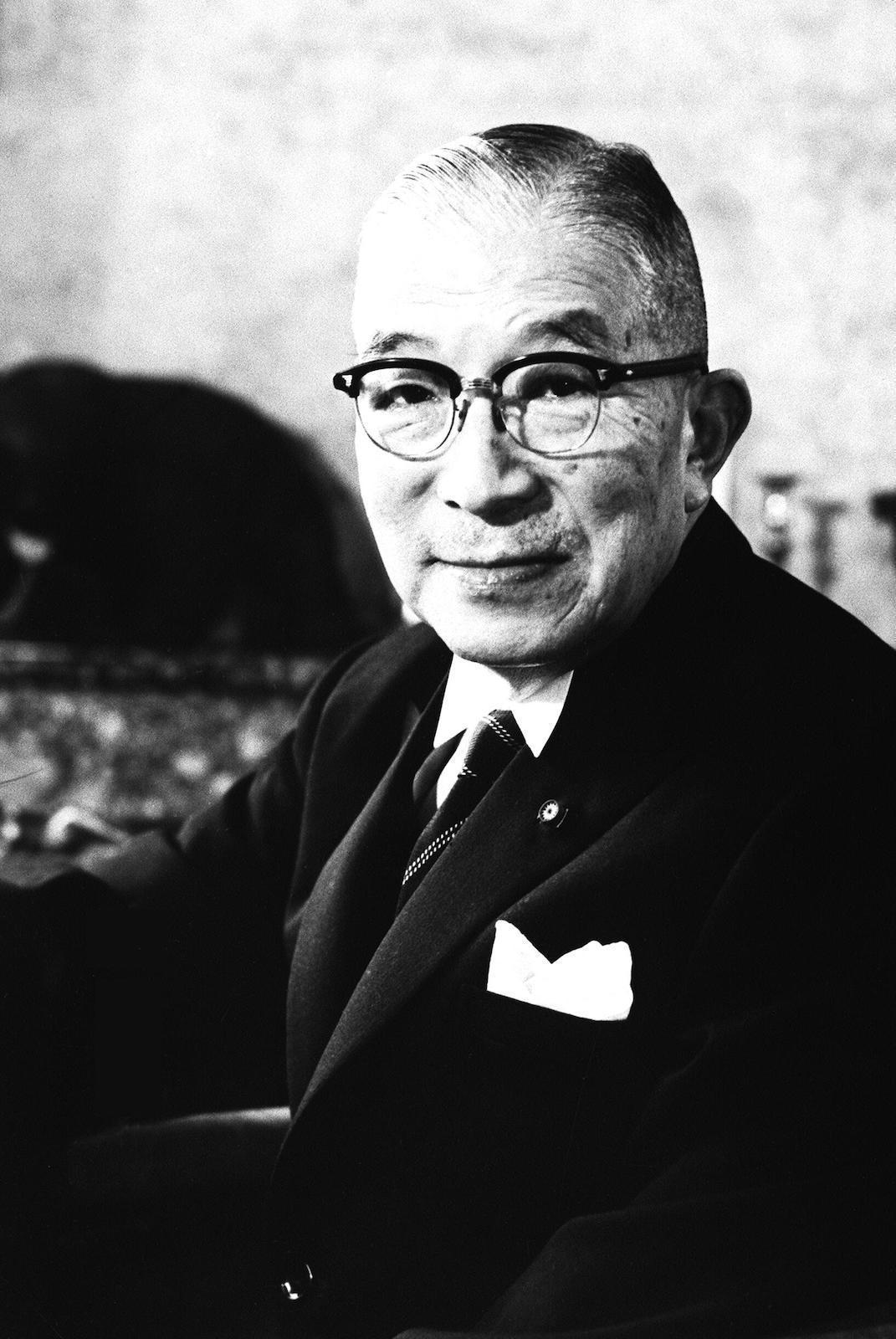
Ichirō Hatoyama

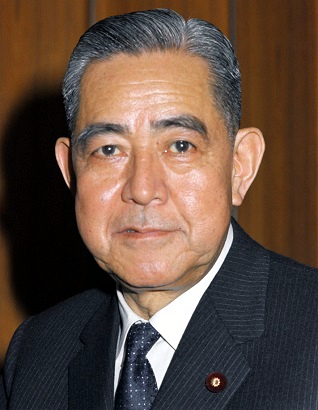
Eisaku Sato

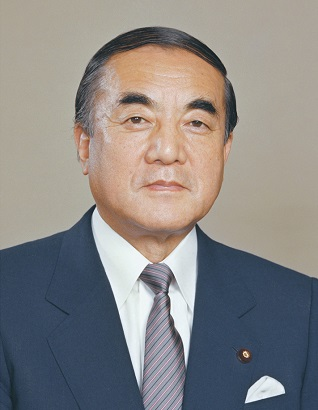
Yasuhiro Nakasone

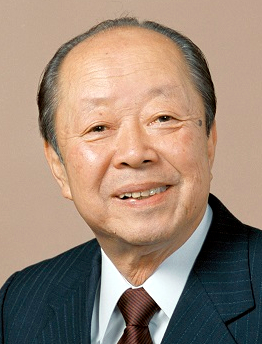
Kiichi Miyazawa

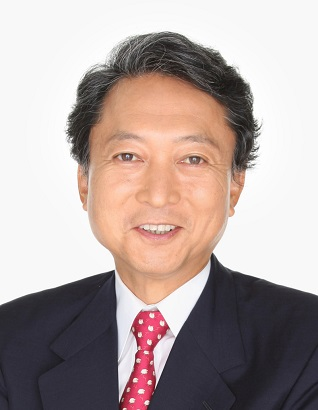
Yukio Hatoyama

The University of Tokyo has educated eighteen prime ministers of Japan: Takashi Hara (dropped out), Earl Takaaki Katō (Law, 1881), Baron Reijirō Wakatsuki (Law, 1892), Osachi Hamaguchi (Law, 1895), Kōki Hirota (Law, 1905), Duke Fumimaro Konoe (Letters, dropped out), Baron Hiranuma Kiichirō (Law, 1888), Baron Kijūrō Shidehara (Law, 1895), Shigeru Yoshida (Law, 1906), Tetsu Katayama (Law, 1912), Hitoshi Ashida (Law, 1912), Ichirō Hatoyama (Law, 1907), Nobusuke Kishi (Law, 1920), Eisaku Satō (Law, 1924), Takeo Fukuda (Law, 1929), Yasuhiro Nakasone (Law, 1941), Kiichi Miyazawa (Law, 1941), Yukio Hatoyama (Engineering, 1969). Eisaku Satō received the Nobel Peace Prize in 1974, for his commitment to halting the spread of nuclear arms.

UTokyo has produced numerous other influential politicians since its establishment. As of December 2023, UTokyo alumni hold 139 seats in the National Diet (the national legislature of Japan), accounting for about a fifth of the total seats. Six members of the cabinet are UTokyo alumni, including the Chief Cabinet Secretary: Yoshimasa Hayashi; Internal Affairs: Takeaki Matsumoto; Justice: Ryuji Koizumi; Foreign Affairs: Yoko Kamikawa; Education, Culture, Sports, Science and Technology: Masahito Moriyama; and Economy, Trade and Industry: Ken Saito. As of April 2023, 27 out of the 47 incumbent governors of Japanese prefectures have received their undergraduate education at UTokyo.

UTokyo has produced a large number of distinguished jurists, judges and lawyers. As of February 2024, eleven out of the fifteen incumbent justices of the Supreme Court are UTokyo alumni. The university is also the alma mater of all four Japanese judges of the International Court of Justice: Kōtarō Tanaka, Shigeru Oda, Hisashi Owada and Yuji Iwasawa. Tomoko Akane has served as the president of the International Criminal Court (ICC) since March 2024.

=== Sciences, engineering and mathematics ===
Scientists and engineers who attended the University of Tokyo

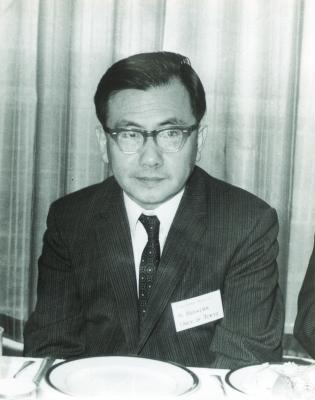
Kunihiko Kodaira

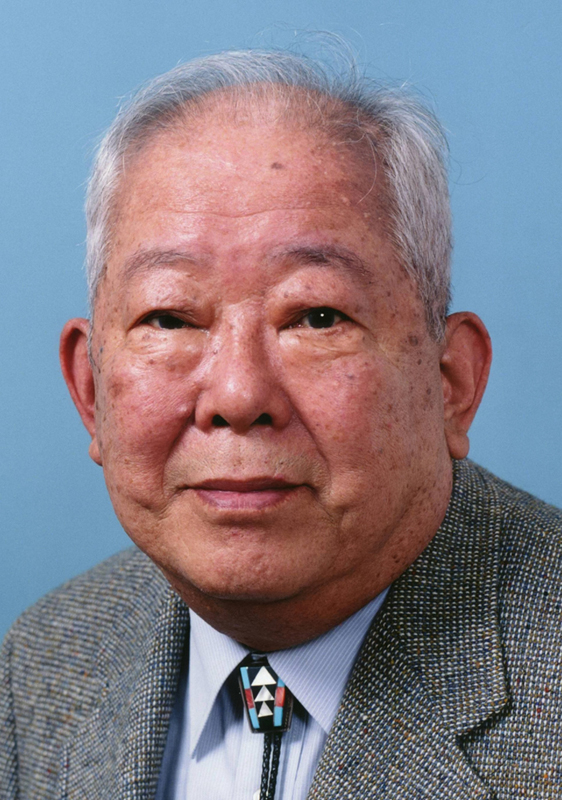
Masatoshi Koshiba

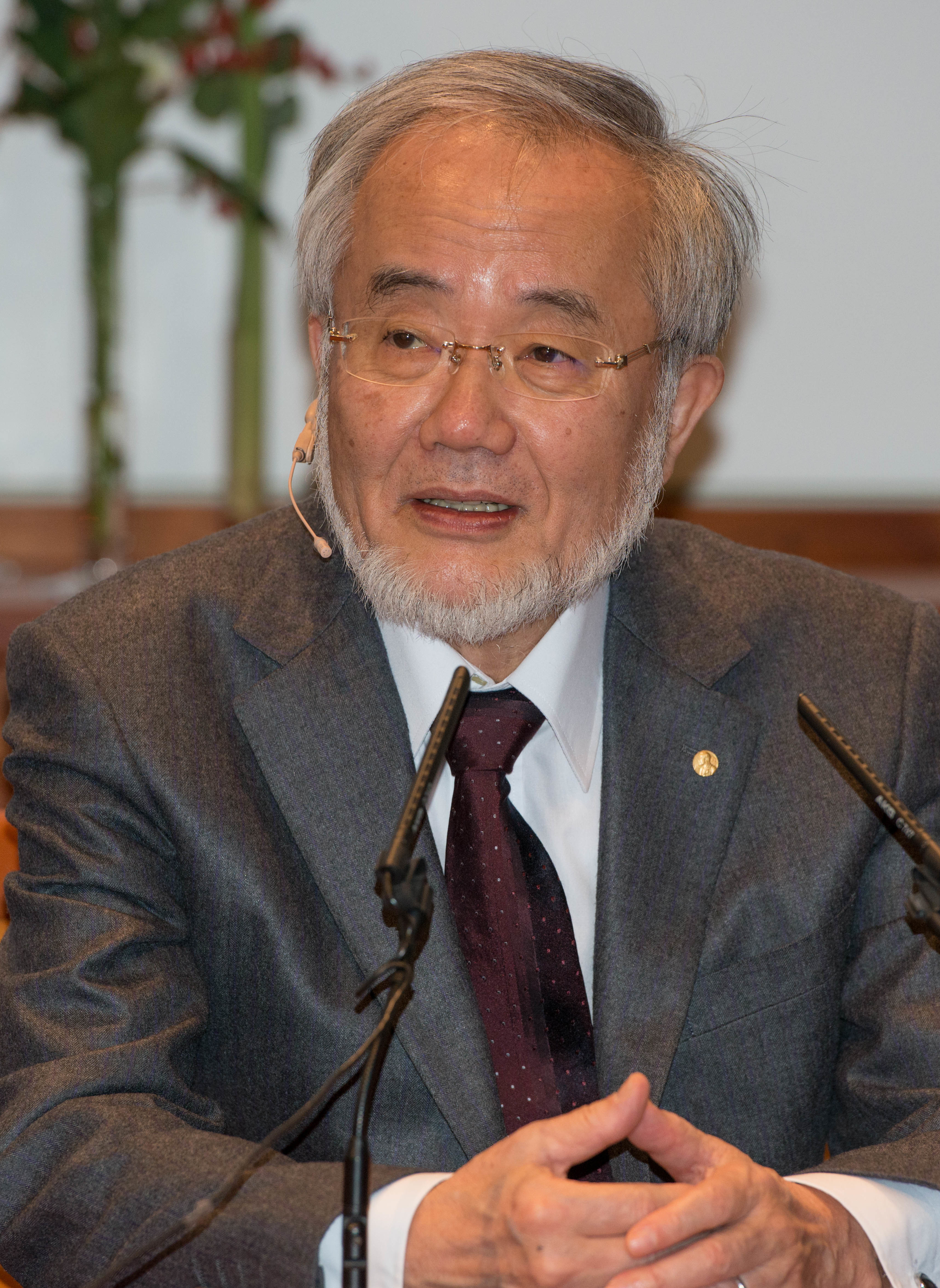
Yoshinori Ohsumi

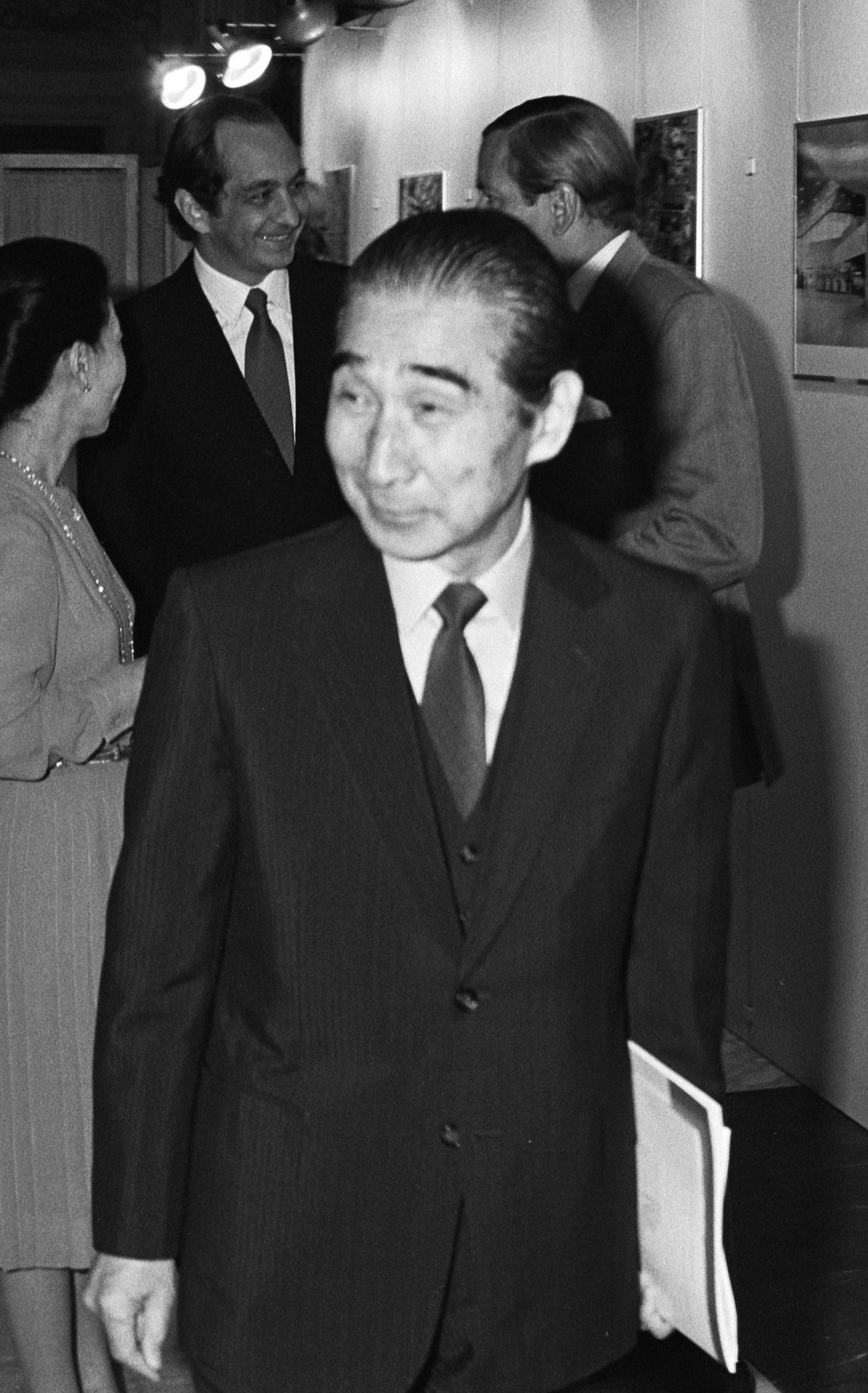
Kenzo Tange

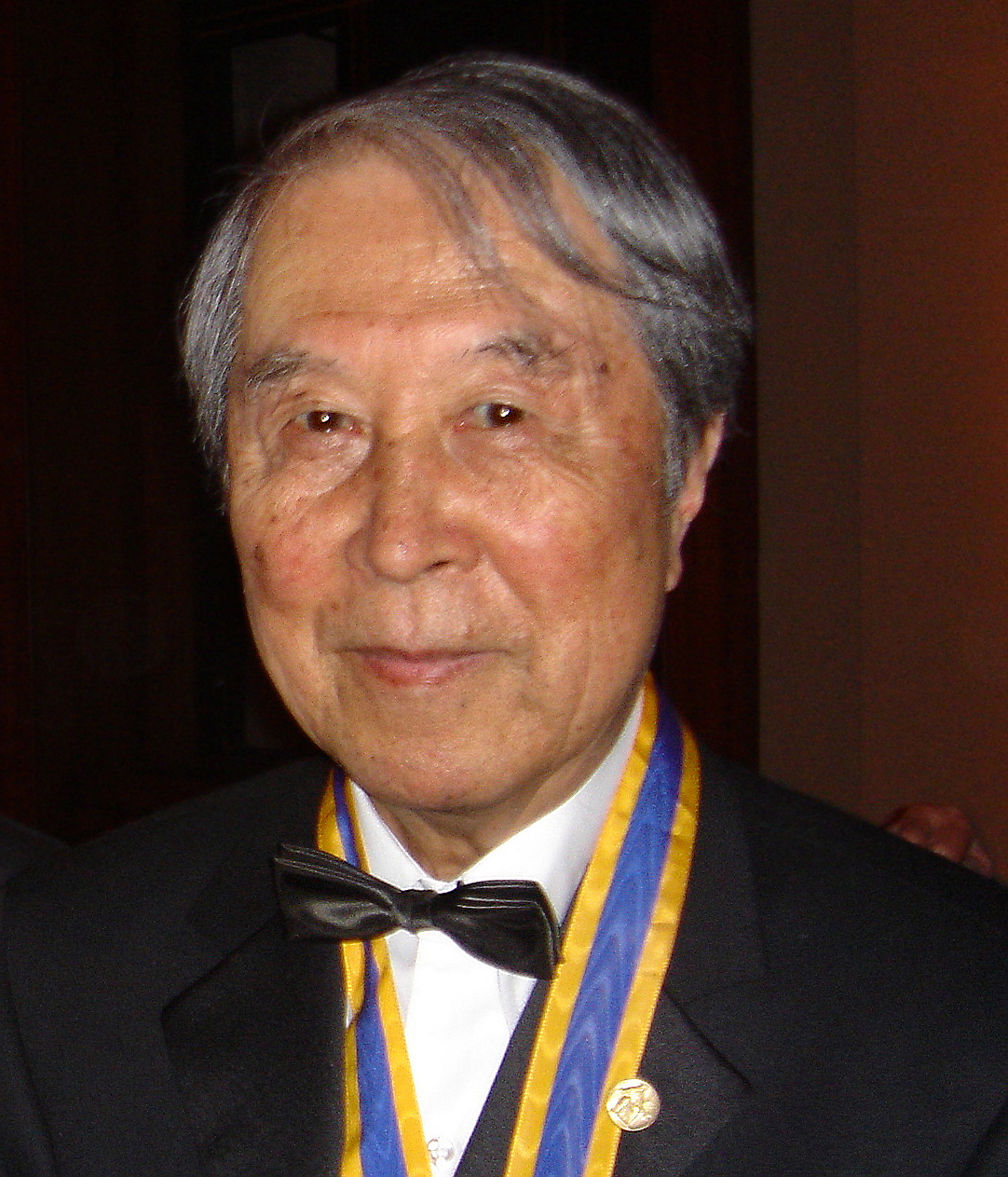
Yoichiro Nambu

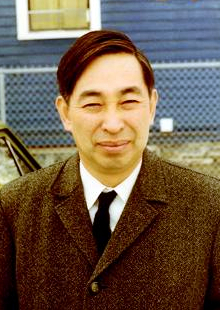
Kiyoshi Ito

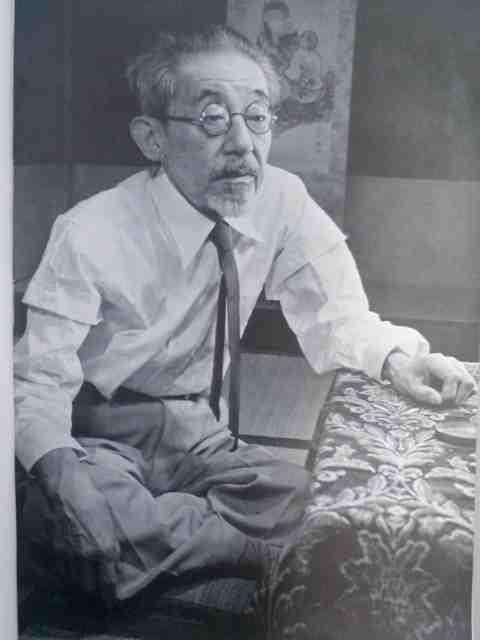
Teiji Takagi

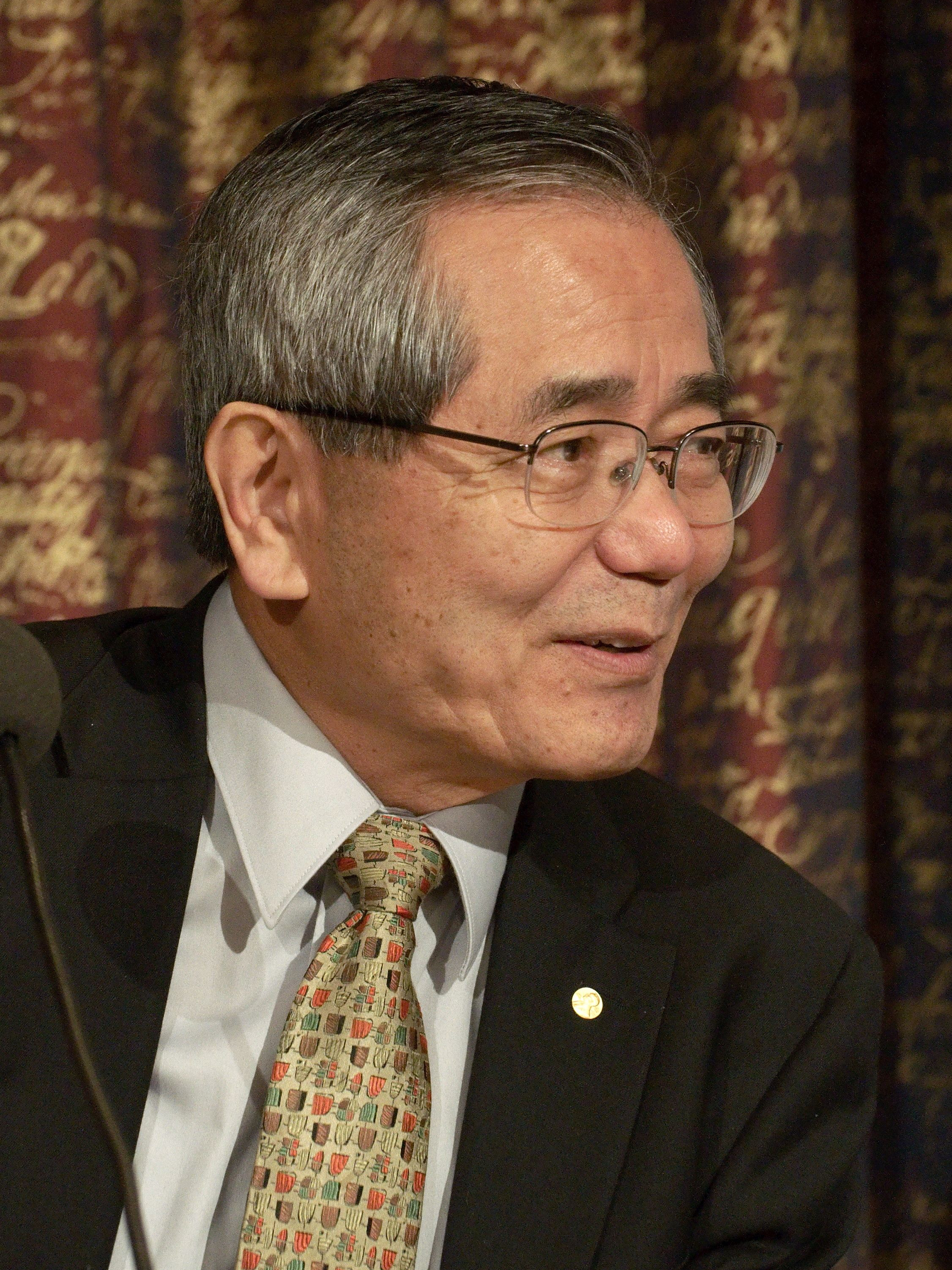
Ei-ichi Negishi

Ten Nobel-awarded scientists have earned degrees from UTokyo: six in physics (Leo Esaki, Masatoshi Koshiba, Shin'ichirō Tomonaga, Yoichiro Nambu, Takaaki Kajita and Syukuro Manabe), two in chemistry (Ei-ichi Negishi and Kensō Soai) and two in Physiology or Medicine (Yoshinori Ohsumi and Satoshi Ōmura). Additionally, Kunihiko Kodaira won a Fields Medal, Masaki Kashiwara won an Abel Prize, both often called the 'Nobel Prize for mathematics'. Four architects educated at the Faculty of Engineering have received the Pritzker Architecture Prize: Kenzo Tange, Arata Isozaki, Toyo Ito and Fumihiko Maki.

Other UTokyo-educated scientists, engineers, and mathematicians include Kiyoshi Ito, known for his work in probability theory; Hantaro Nagaoka, a pioneer in atomic theory; Yoshio Nishina, who made significant contributions to particle physics; and Teiji Takagi, known for his work in number theory. Yoji Totsuka was an influential figure in neutrino physics. Kikunae Ikeda is credited with discovering umami. Kitasato Shibasaburō discovered the infectious agent of bubonic plague, and Kazuhiko Nishijima contributed to the discovery of the Gell-Mann–Nishijima formula. Hirotugu Akaike developed the Akaike Information Criterion, and Hideo Shima was the chief engineer behind the development of the Shinkansen bullet train. Yuzuru Hiraga was the chief engineer at the Imperial Japanese Navy, then the third-strongest in the world, and Takamine Jōkichi was the first to isolate adrenaline. Akira Fujishima discovered the photocatalytic properties of titanium dioxide, and Tosio Kato made notable contributions to functional analysis. Kenkichi Iwasawa is known for his influence on algebraic number theory. Shun'ichi Amari invented and formulated the recurrent neural network (RNN) for learning.

=== Business, economics and finance ===
Industrialists, economists and central bankers who attended the University of Tokyo

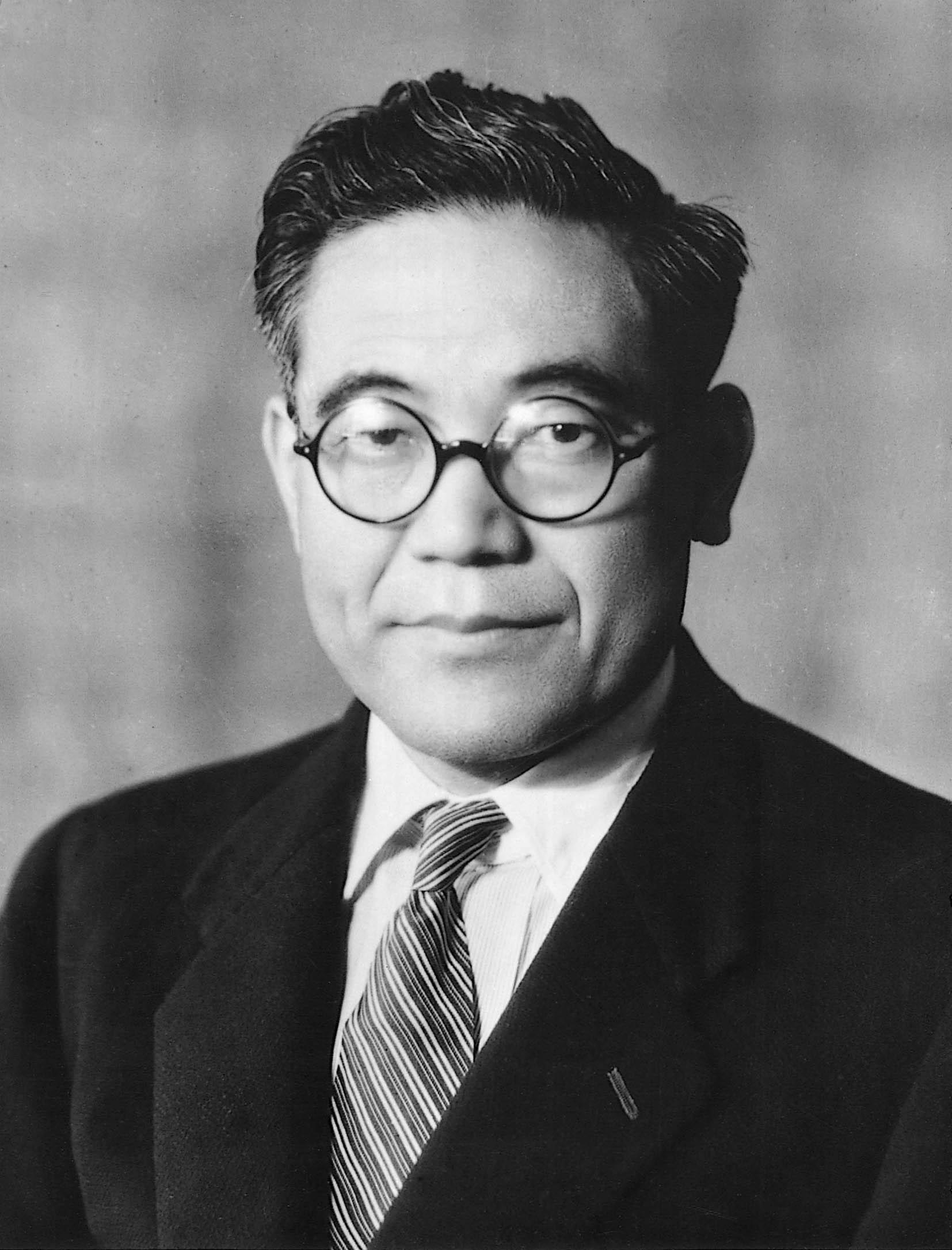
Kiichiro Toyoda, founder of Toyota

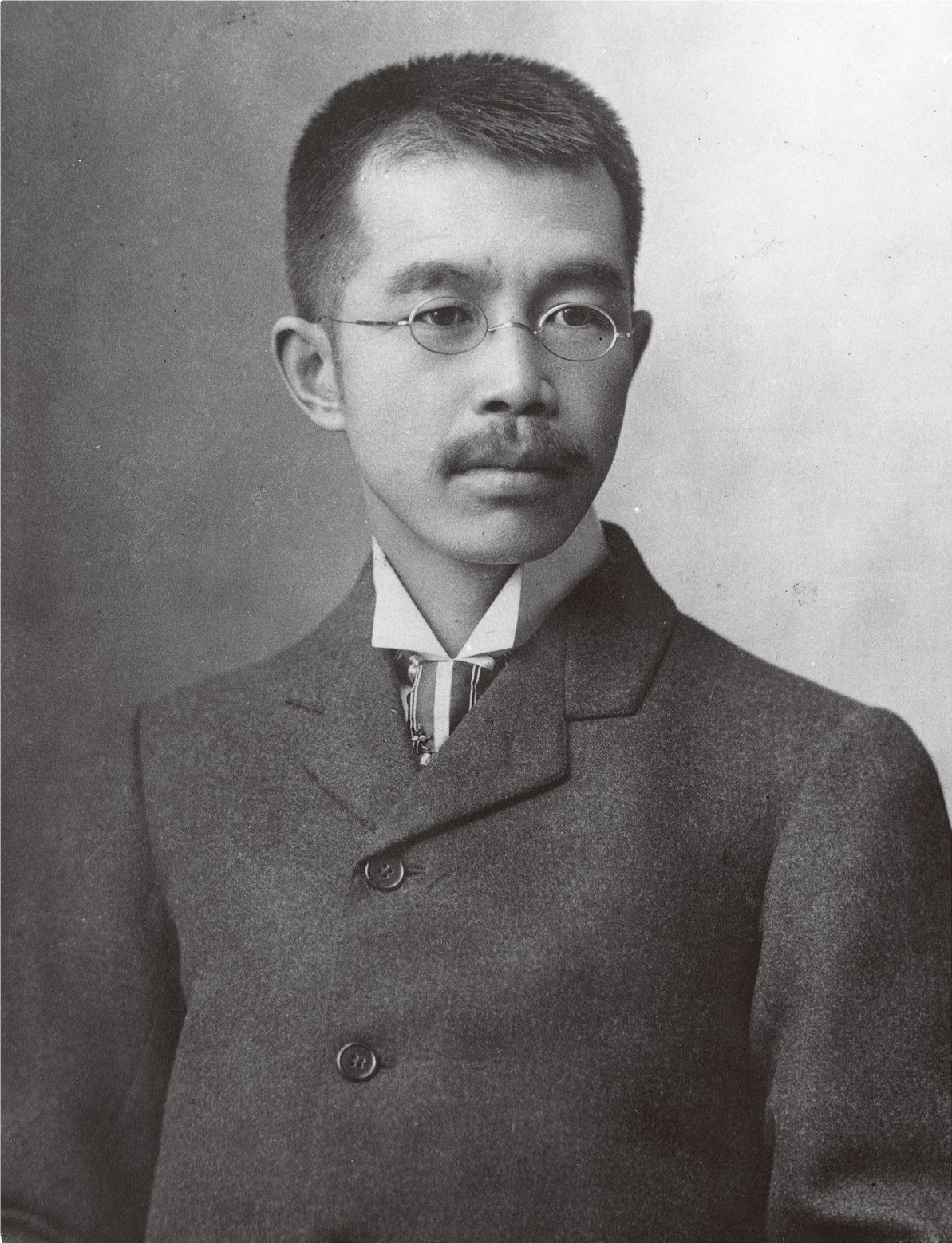
Namihei Odaira, founder of Hitachi

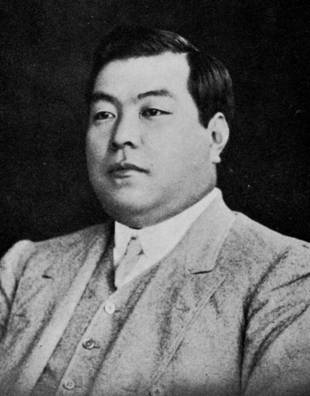
Baron Koyata Iwasaki, longest-serving head of Mitsubishi

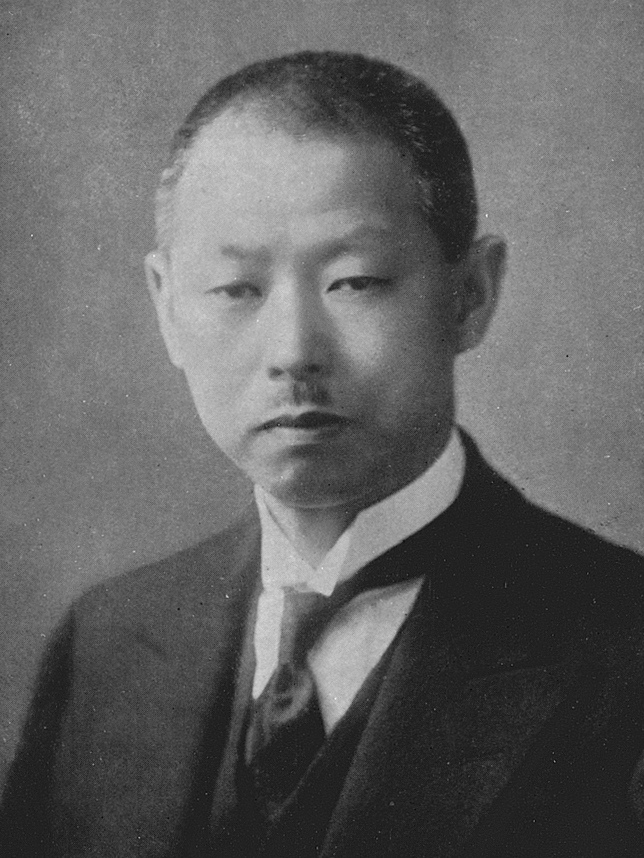
Yoshisuke Ayukawa, founder of the Nissan Group

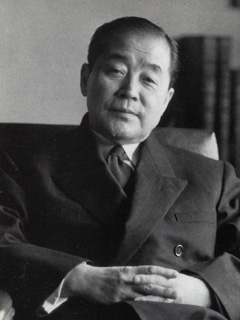
Viscount Keizo Shibusawa, governor of BoJ

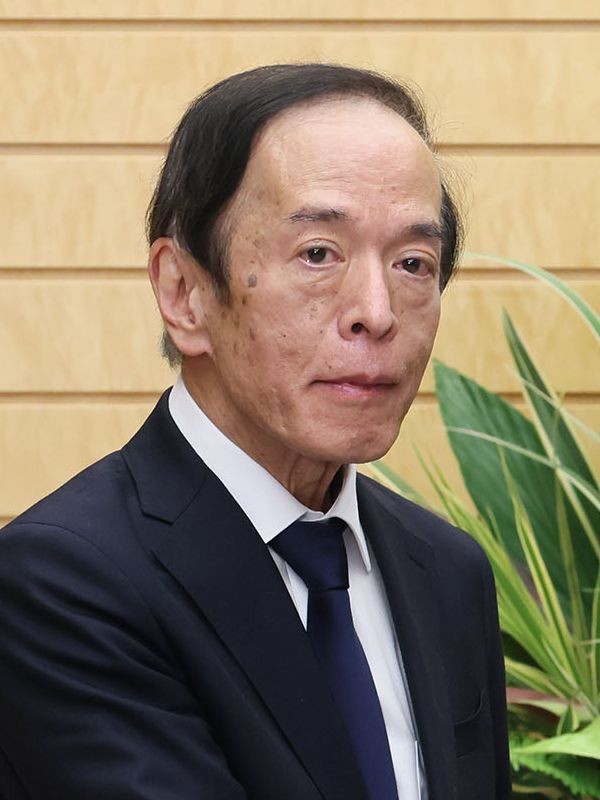
Kazuo Ueda, governor of BoJ since 2023

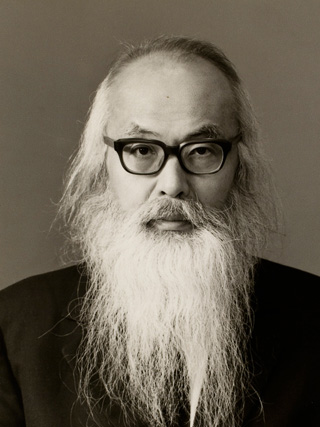
Hirofumi Uzawa, mathematical economist

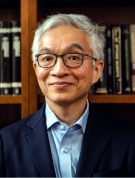
Nobuhiro Kiyotaki, New Keynesian economist

Kiichiro Toyoda, an alumnus of the Faculty of Engineering, founded Toyota Motor, the largest car manufacturer in the world and the largest company in Japan by both market capitalisation and revenue. Namihei Odaira, also an alumnus of the Faculty of Engineering, founded Hitachi, one of the largest electronics conglomerates in the world. Another UTokyo-educated engineer, Yoshisuke Ayukawa, founded the Nissan Group (zaibatsu), from which some of Japan's largest companies, such as Nissan, Isuzu, NEC, and SOMPO Holdings, spun off. Baron Koyata Iwasaki, a member of the founding Iwasaki family of Mitsubishi, was the longest-serving and last head of the group before it was split up by order of the Allied Occupation Forces after the Second World War. Under his leadership, the group's business evolved significantly, and he founded companies such as Mitsubishi Heavy Industries and Nikon. Hiromasa Ezoe, as an educational psychology student at UTokyo in 1961, established Recruit Holdings, the largest human resources company in Japan, which also runs worldwide businesses including Indeed and Glassdoor. UTokyo alumni have held chief executive positions at numerous influential Japanese companies; as of April 2024, companies under the leadership of a UTokyo alumnus include Sony (Kenichiro Yoshida), MUFG (Hironori Kamezawa) and Mitsubishi Corp (Katsuya Nakanishi [ja]). More than half of the governors of the Bank of Japan, the central bank of Japan, have been UTokyo alumni, including the incumbent governor Kazuo Ueda, who previously taught at UTokyo.

=== Literature, arts and humanities ===
Literary figures who attended the University of Tokyo

Soseki Natsume

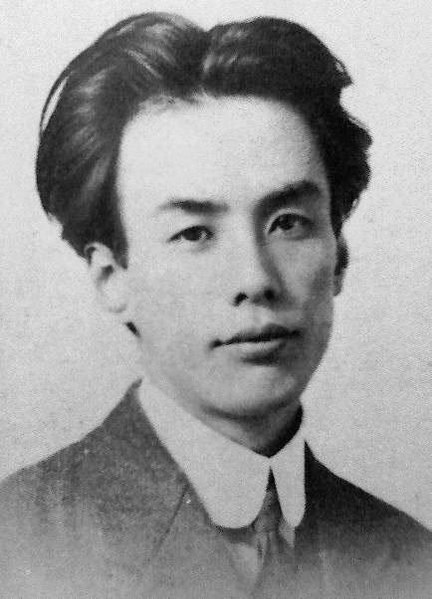
Ryunosuke Akutagawa

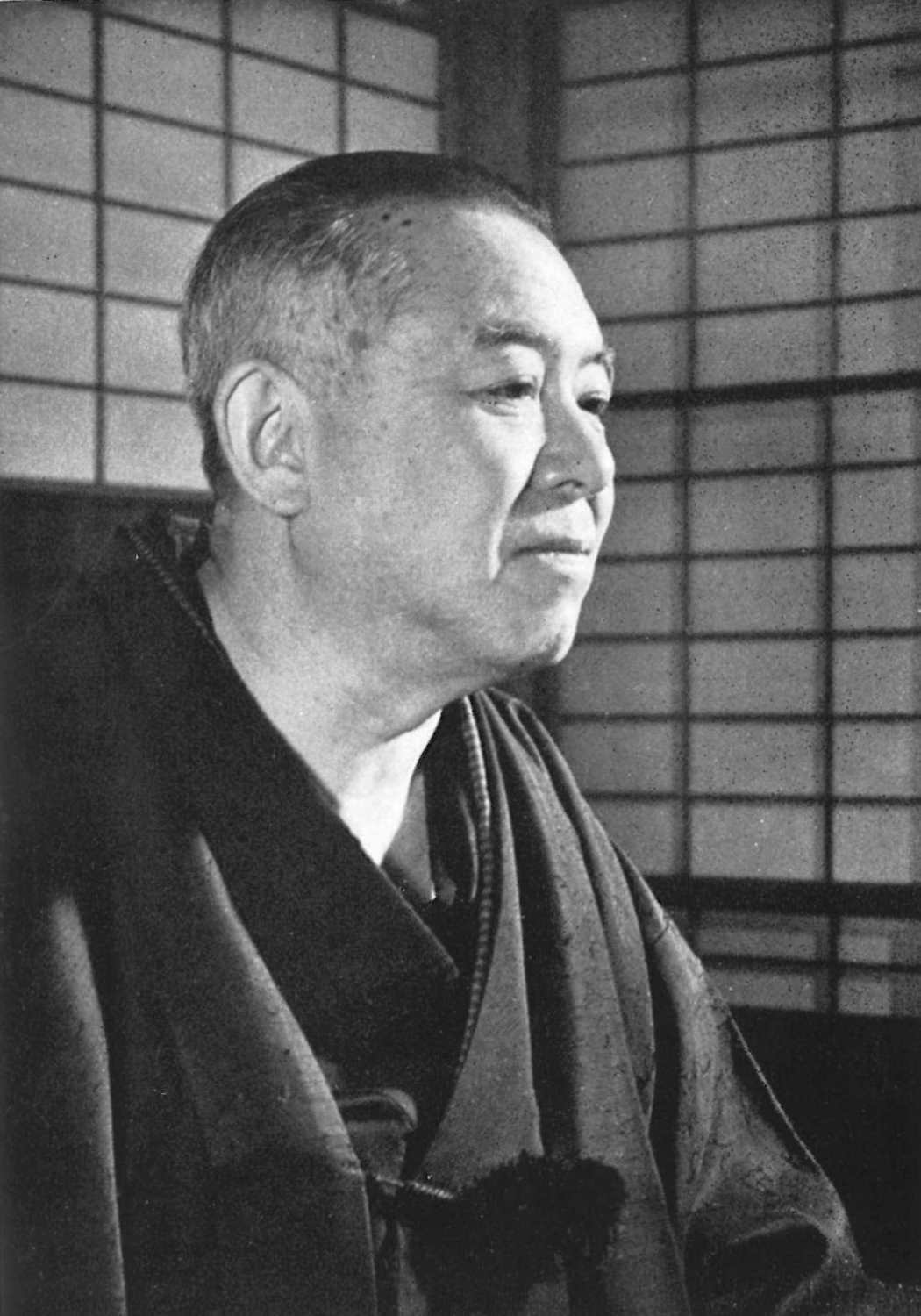
Junichiro Tanizaki

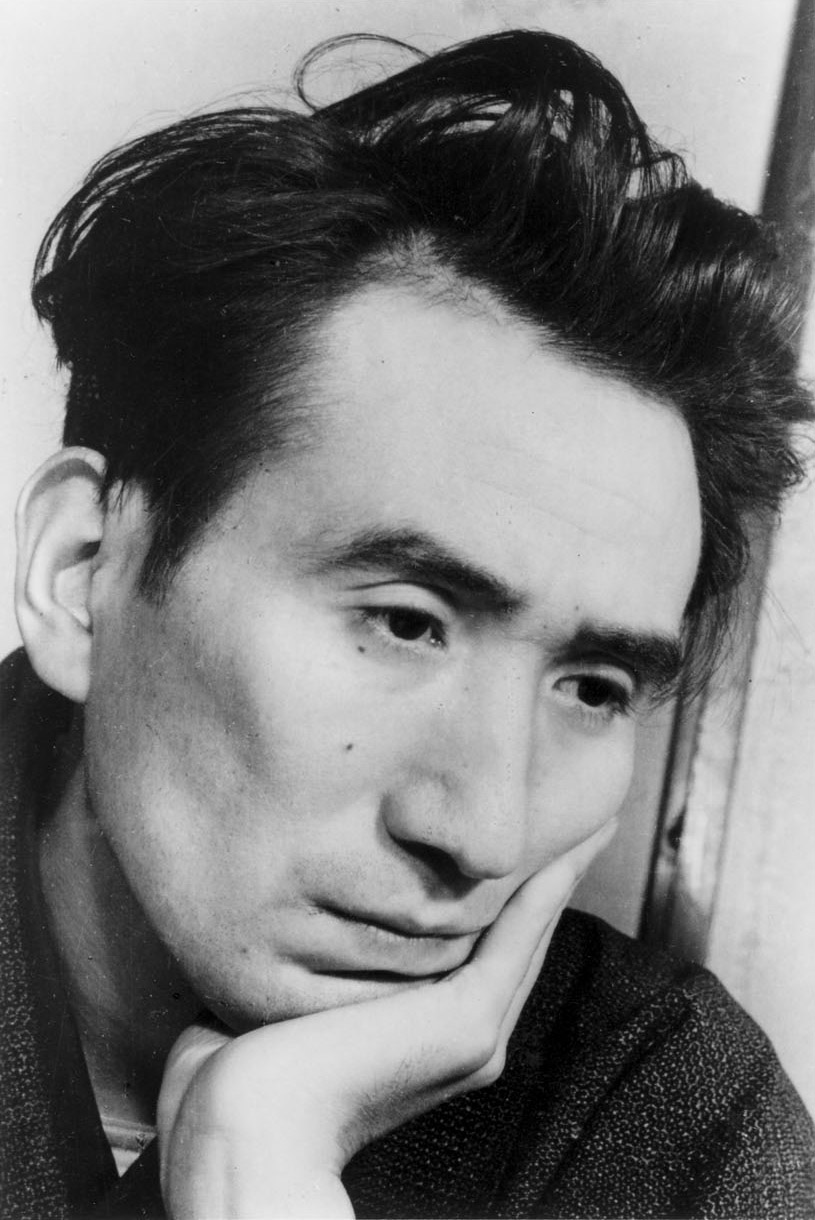
Osamu Dazai

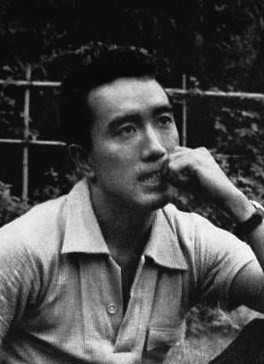
Yukio Mishima

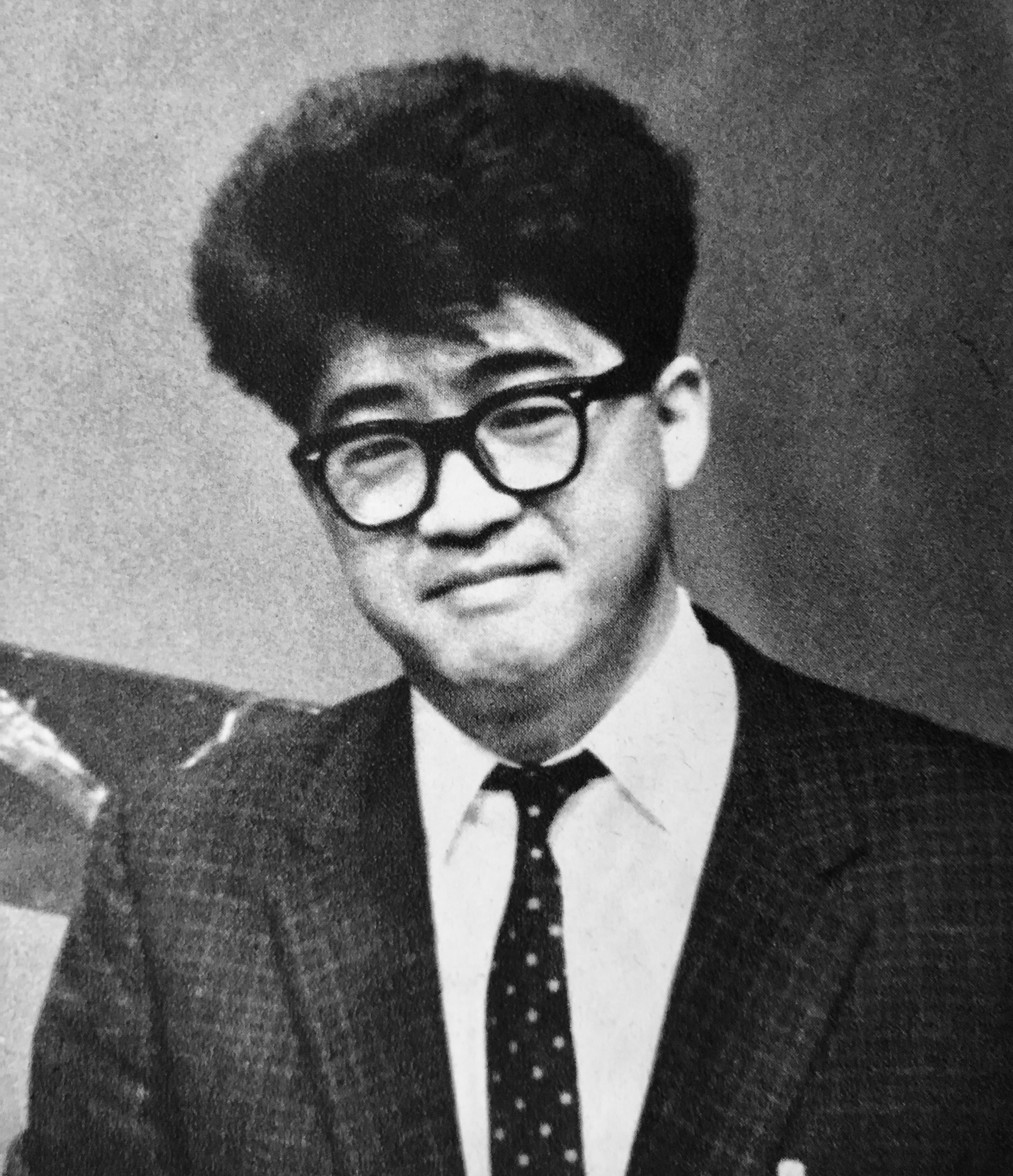
Kobo Abe

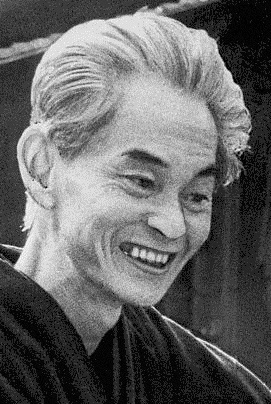
Yasunari Kawabata

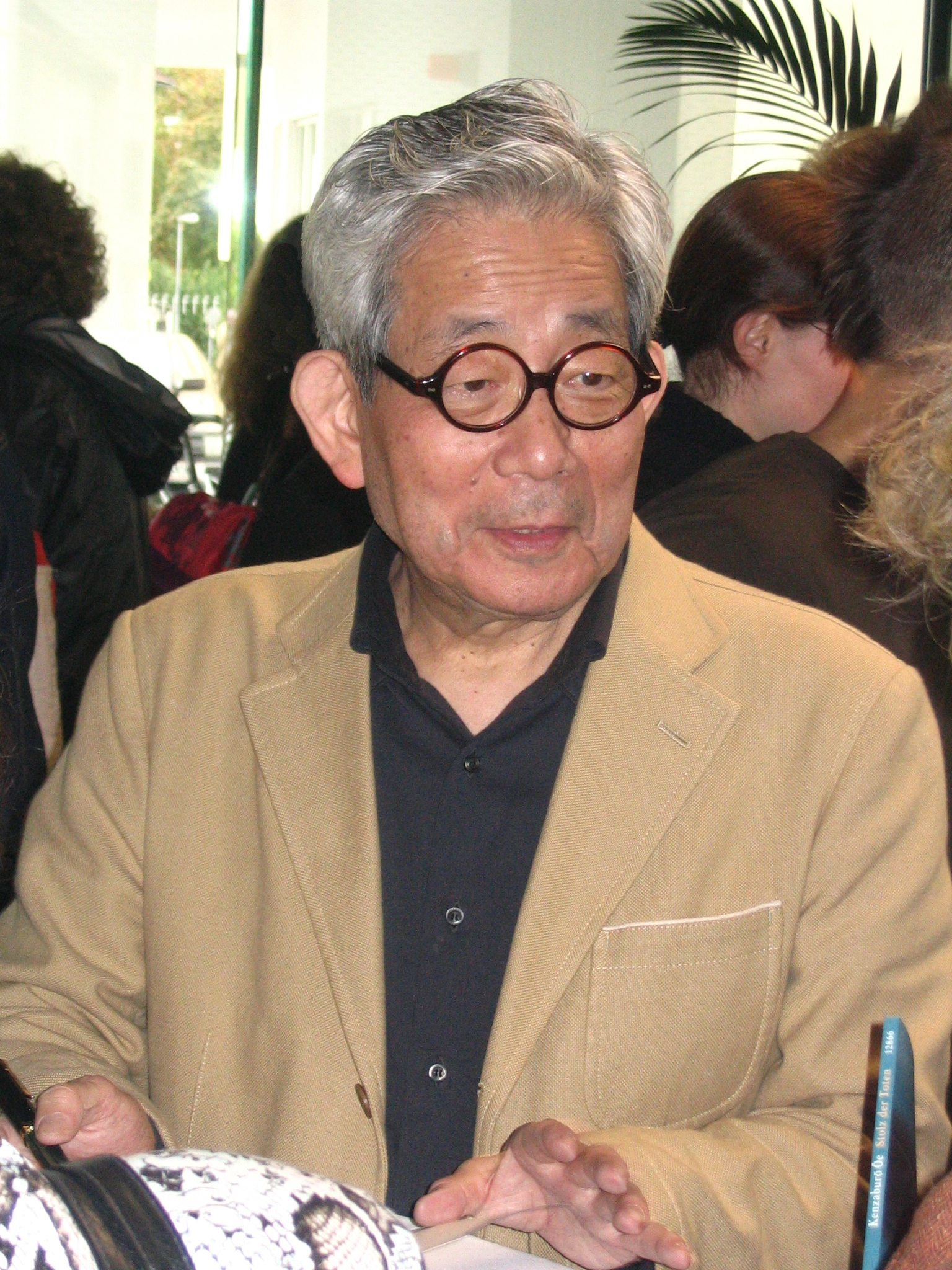
Kenzaburo Oe

Many notable literary figures have attended the University of Tokyo, two of whom received the Nobel Prize in Literature: Yasunari Kawabata (Known for The Dancing Girl of Izu, Snow Country and The Old Capital) and Kenzaburo Oe (A Personal Matter, The Silent Cry and Death by Water). Other notable UTokyo-educated writers include: Soseki Natsume (I Am a Cat, Botchan, Sanshiro and Kokoro), Ōgai Mori, Ryunosuke Akutagawa, Junichiro Tanizaki, Naoya Shiga, Osamu Dazai, Yukio Mishima, Kobo Abe, Shōyō Tsubouchi, Shinichi Hoshi, Kōyō Ozaki, Jun Takami, Motojiro Kaijii, Shūichi Katō, Kunio Kishida, Hideo Kobayashi, Shigeharu Nakano, Hyakken Uchida, Makoto Oda, Tatsuo Hori, Mari Yonehara and Atsushi Nakajima. Shiki Masaoka is known as the initiator of modern haiku poetry and one of the most celebrated poets in Japanese history. Other notable UTokyo-educated poets include Mokichi Saito, Nobutsuna Sasaki, Makoto Ōoka, Hōsai Ozaki, Saneatsu Mushanokōji and Tatsuji Miyoshi.

Isao Takahata co-founded Studio Ghibli with Hayao Miyazaki and directed animation films including Grave of the Fireflies, Pom Poko, and The Tale of the Princess Kaguya. Together with Miyazaki, he created animation films such as Nausicaä of the Valley of the Wind and Laputa: Castle in the Sky. Yoji Yamada directed the film series Otoko wa Tsurai yo and the Samurai Trilogy (The Twilight Samurai, The Hidden Blade and Love and Honor). Koichi Sugiyama is known for composing the music for Dragon Quest, along with several other famous video games, anime, films, television shows, and pop songs. Wowaka is considered to be a pioneer in the vocaloid music industry, especially Hatsune Miku. Kunio Yanagita made significant contributions to the preservation and studies of Japanese folklore. Yanagi Sōetsu initiated the mingei (folk craft) movement, and his contributions made the idea of finding beauty in everyday utilitarian crafts popular. Nam June Paik, a Korean-American media artist, is considered to be the founder of video art.

=== Other notable alumni and affiliates ===
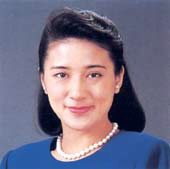
Masako, Empress of Japan

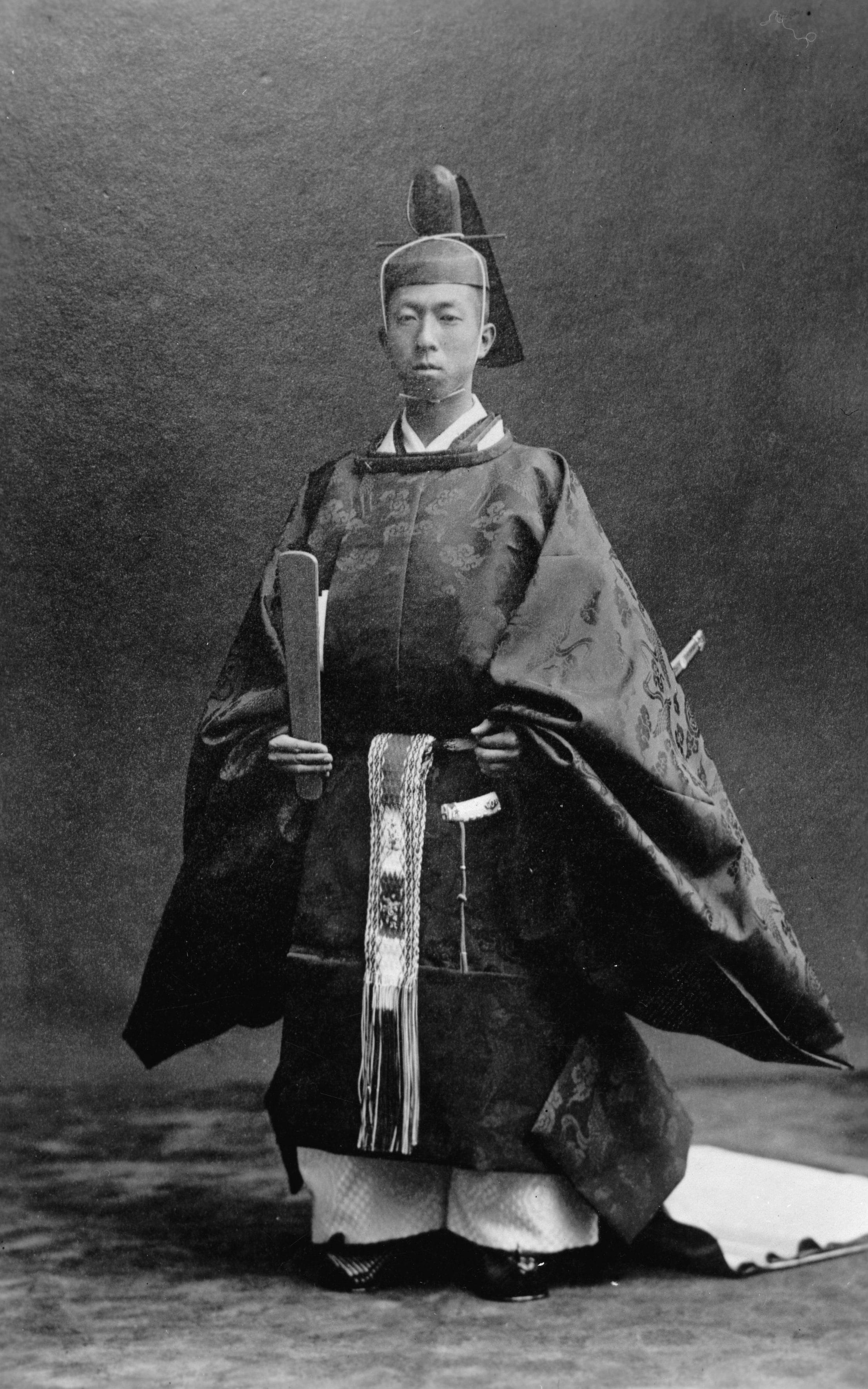
Takahito, Prince Mikasa

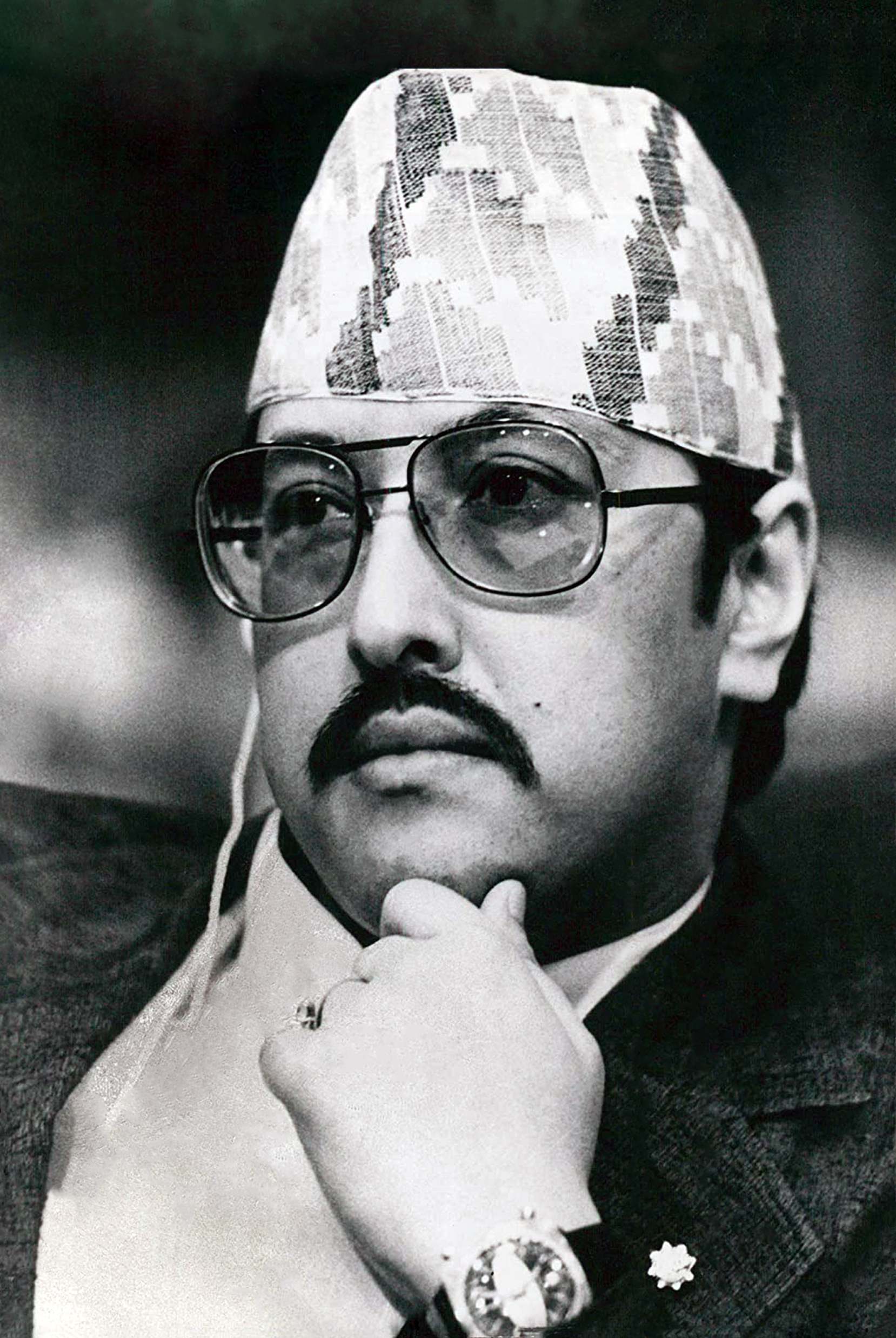
Birendra Bir Bikram Shah Dev, King of Nepal

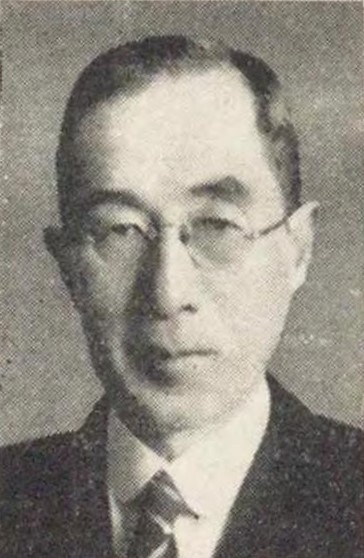
Duke Iemasa Tokugawa, 17th head of the Tokugawa clan

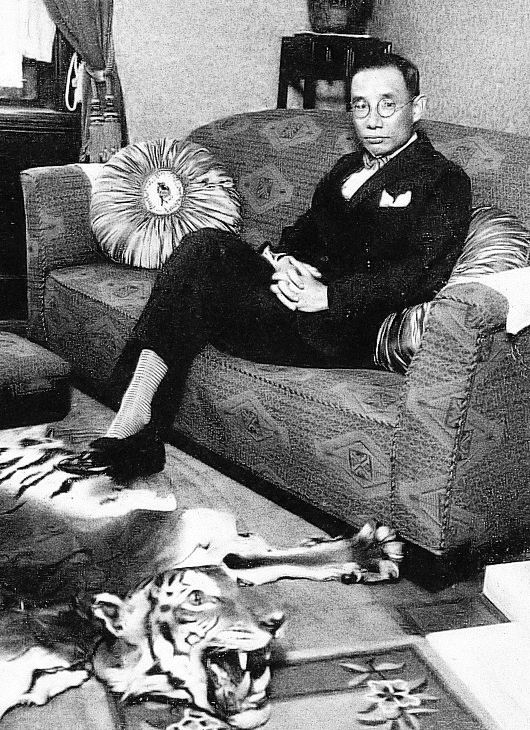
Marquess Yoshichika Tokugawa, botanist

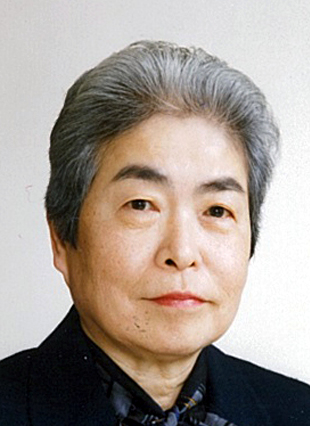
Chie Nakane, Social Anthropologist

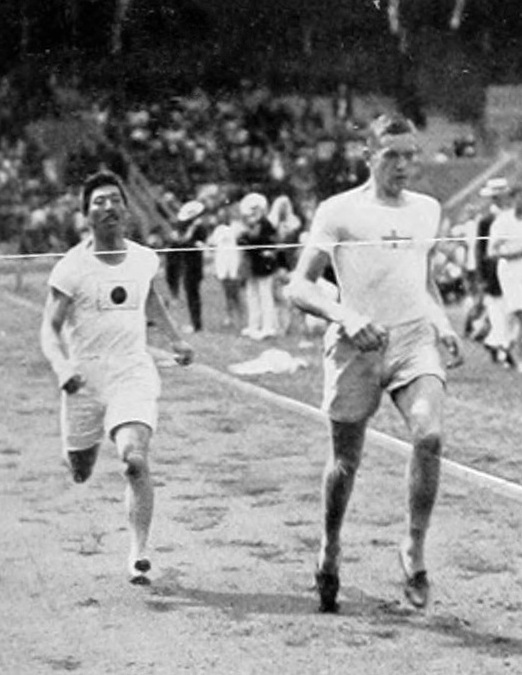
Yahiko Mishima (left), first Japanese national to compete in the Olympics

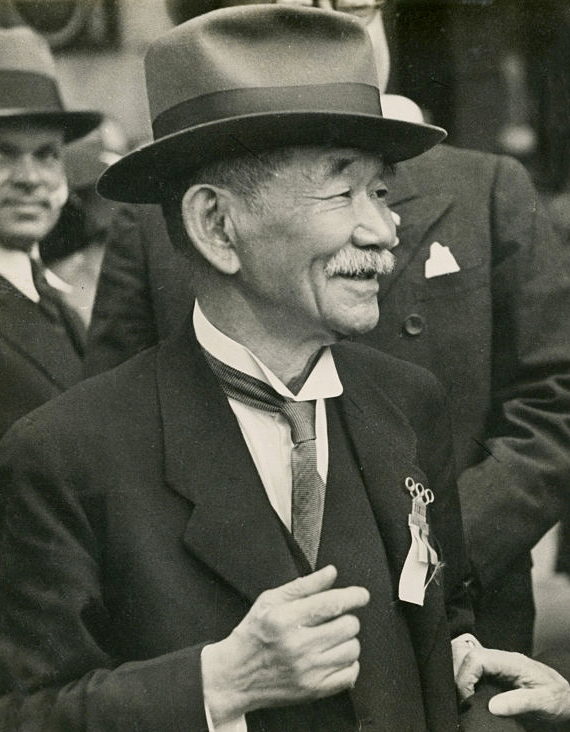
Kanō Jigorō, founder of Judo

Masako, Empress of Japan, attended UTokyo after finishing her first degree overseas, although she did not earn a degree from the university. The university's other recent connections with the Imperial family include Takahito, Prince Mikasa, younger brother of Emperor Hirohito, who studied archaeology; Fujimaro, Marquess of Tsukuba, a younger son of Kikumaro, Prince Yamashina, who studied Japanese literature. Additionally, Crown Prince Fumihito, and his daughter Princess Mako both worked at the University Museum at different times. King Birendra of Nepal also attended UTokyo but did not earn a degree. UTokyo was a preferred educational institution for members of the Japanese aristocracy before any form of peerage, with the exception of the Imperial family, was prohibited with the 1947 constitution. Duke Iemasa Tokugawa, 17th head of the House of Tokugawa, studied law at the university and led a career as a diplomat. Other members of the clan who attended the university include Marquess Yoshichika Tokugawa, who became active as a botanist and patron of arts and sciences later in his life, and Earl Muneyoshi Tokugawa, who was the primary promoter of forestation movements in Japan. Earl Yoriyasu Arima studied agriculture and later served as the Minister of Agriculture. The Arima Kinen, the world's largest betting horse race, was named in his honour. Marquess Yoshi Hijikata, with his strong communist sympathies, fled to Soviet Russia and was deprived of his title on account of this. Another communist sympathiser among UTokyo's alumni, Hotsumi Ozaki, played a central role in Soviet espionage with Richard Sorge and was executed for high treason in 1944.

Chie Nakane, a social anthropologist, was one of the first nineteen female students matriculated at UTokyo in 1947, and she later became the first female professor in the university's history. Hidesaburo Ueno, an agricultural scientist who studied and worked at the Faculty of Agriculture, is best known as the owner of the devoted dog Hachiko, who continued to wait for him for more than 9 years. Although the university is not particularly noted for athletics today, beginning with Yahiko Mishima, the first-ever Japanese Olympian who competed in the 1912 Summer Olympics, 33 UTokyo students and alumni have competed in the Olympics. Kusuo Kitamura, later a senior bureaucrat at the Ministry of Labour, won a gold medal in the Men's 1500 metre freestyle swimming in the 1932 Summer Olympics. Judo, now an Olympic sport, was created by Jigoro Kano in 1882, the year he graduated from UTokyo. He was also the central figure in Japan's successful bid to host the 1940 Summer Olympic Games, which had to be cancelled due to the Second World War.

== See also ==
- Earthquake engineering
- Imperial College of Engineering
- International Journal of Asian Studies – published in association with the Institute for Advanced Studies on Asia, University of Tokyo
- Koishikawa Botanical Gardens
- Nikko Botanical Garden
- University of Tokyo Library
- University Museum, University of Tokyo
