= Yoshikazu Uchida =

Japanese architect

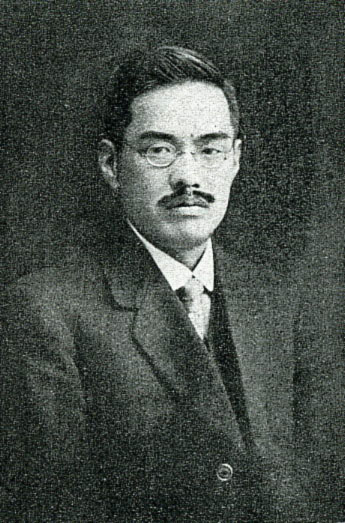
- Born: February 23, 1885; Tōkyō, Japan
- Died: December 14, 1972 (aged 87); Tōkyō, Japan
- Education: University of Tokyo
- Occupation: Architect
- Awards: Blue Ribbon Medal for Architecture; Order of Culture
- Buildings: University of Tōkyō Main Auditorium (Yasuda Auditorium)
- Projects: Kanto Earthquake collective housing project

Yoshikazu Uchida (内田 祥三, Uchida Yoshikazu; February 23, 1885 – December 14, 1972) was a Japanese architect and structural engineer. He designed many buildings on the campus of the University of Tokyo, and served as the 14th president of the university.

== Career ==
Uchida was one of five 1907 graduates from the Department of Architecture of Tokyo Imperial University. For the next four years he worked as an architect in the real estate division of the Mitsubishi group. In 1910, he returned to Tokyo Imperial University for graduate studies under Toshikata Sano, the country's leading structural engineer and a pioneer in the study of earthquake resistant architecture.

From 1911, Uchida lectured at the university on structural engineering. As Sano's successor, he did pioneering work in the study of steel frame and reinforced concrete construction. He also made important contributions in the fields of fire prevention, urban planning, and the restoration of cultural monuments. His interests were wide-ranging, and he influenced nearly every aspect of architectural engineering in Japan.

Uchida also had a lasting influence on the University of Tokyo. In 1923, after much of the campus was destroyed in the great Kantō earthquake, Uchida oversaw the reconstruction effort and devised the master plan that shaped the campus as it exists today. In 1943, he was appointed president of the university. As president he successfully resisted demands from both the Japanese military and the American occupation forces that he allow the university to be used as a military headquarters. (By coincidence, the Dai Ichi Seimei Building, which ultimately did become the occupation's headquarters, was built to one of his designs.)

== Architecture ==
Uchida is best remembered for the buildings he designed on the campus of the University of Tokyo.

With the assistance of younger colleagues and students in the Department of Architecture, he designed some 30 buildings in a distinctive style known as "Uchida Gothic". The massing, towers, and pointed arches of this style recall the Gothic revival architecture of universities in the United States and Europe. But its overall abstract quality also suggests an Expressionist influence, especially in works in which Uchida collaborated with his colleague Hideto Kishida.

A well-known example is Yasuda Auditorium. Completed in 1925, it is a symbol of higher education and one of the most famous buildings in Japan. His work was also part of the architecture event in the art competition at the 1936 Summer Olympics.

== Chronology ==
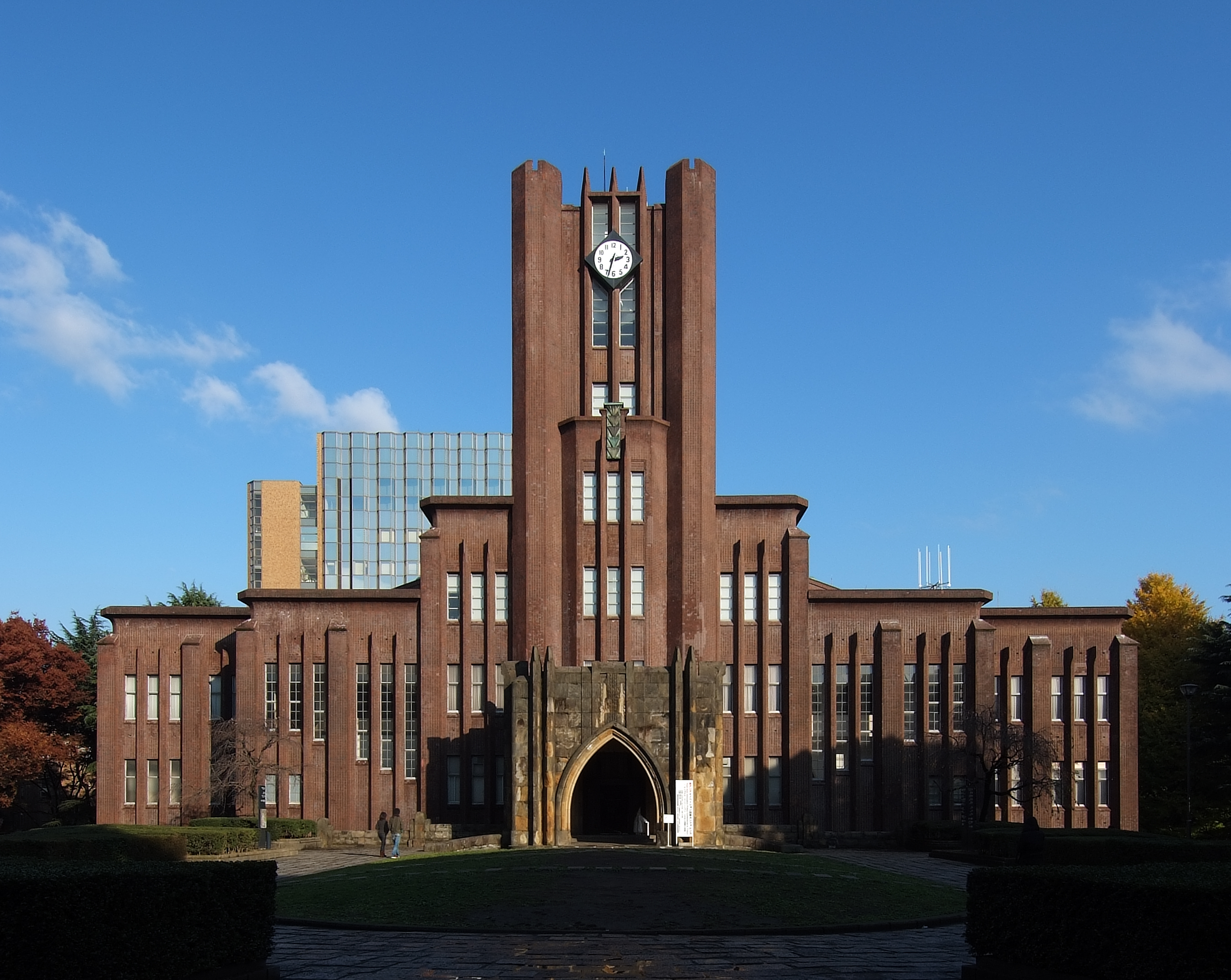
Yasuda Auditorium, with Faculty of Science Building No. 1 visible in the background.

- 1885: Born in Fukagawa (currently Kōtō ward), Tokyo. His father died 4 years later.
- 1901: Enters the First Higher School, a preparatory high school.
- 1904: Enters the Department of Architecture, School of Engineering, at Tokyo Imperial University.
- 1907: Graduates from Department of Architecture and enters the real estate division of the Mitsubishi group, (currently Mitsubishi Estate Co.). Works on the design of office buildings.
- 1910: Enters graduate school at Tokyo Imperial University, studies structural engineering under Toshikata Sano.
- 1911: Lecturer at Tokyo Imperial University and Japanese army school of accounting.
- 1916: Assistant professor at Tokyo Imperial University.
- 1918: Awarded doctorate in engineering for thesis on structural engineering in architecture.
- 1921: Professor at Tokyo Imperial University.
- 1923: Director of buildings department of Tokyo Imperial University.
- 1924: Director of Dōjunkai Foundation (designs Nakanogō Apartments, the first modern apartment buildings in Japan).
- 1935: President of Architectural Institute of Japan.
- 1943: Appointed 14th president of Tokyo Imperial University (until December, 1945).
- 1972: Order of Culture award.

== Works ==
=== University of Tokyo ===
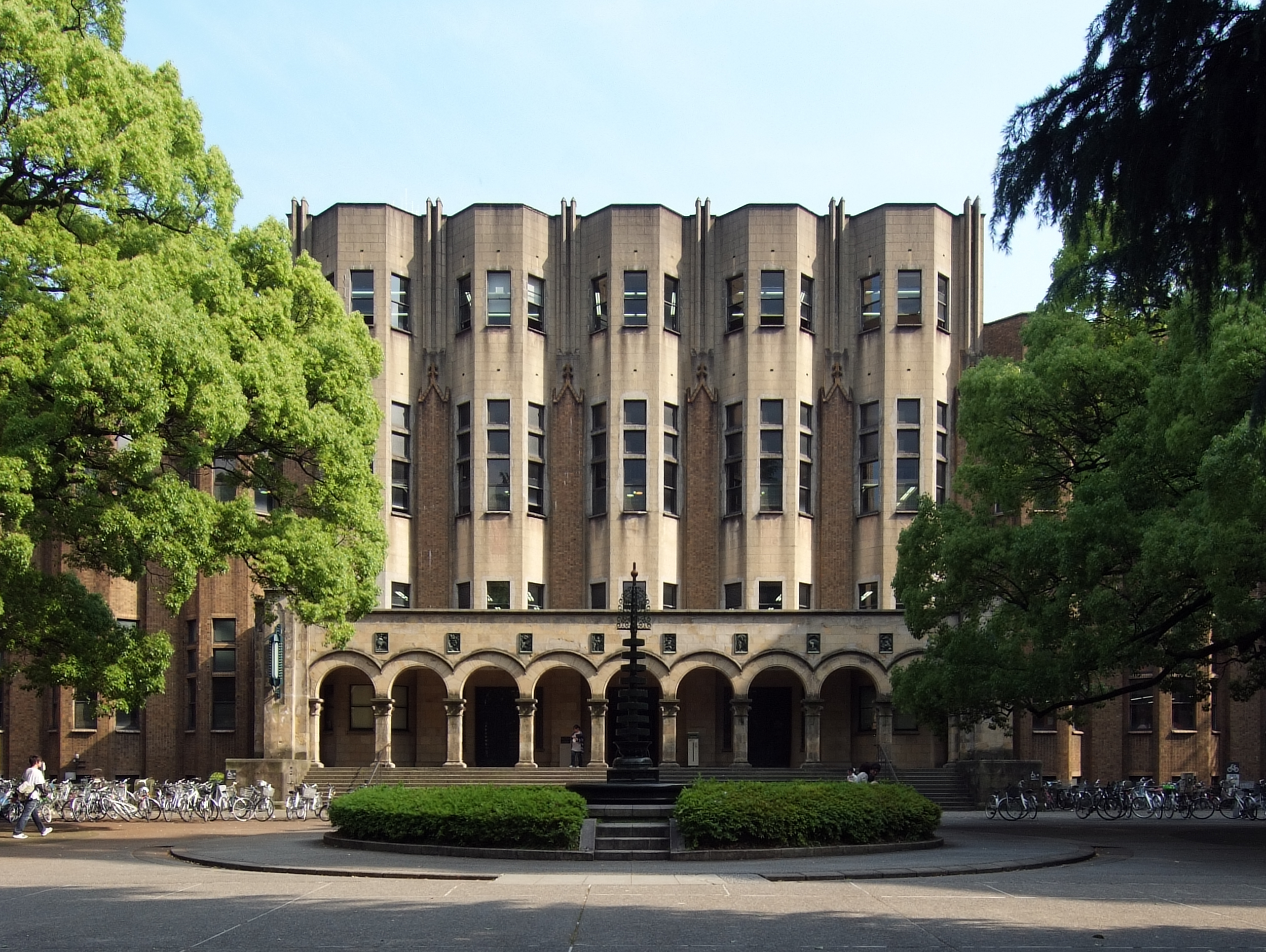
General Library

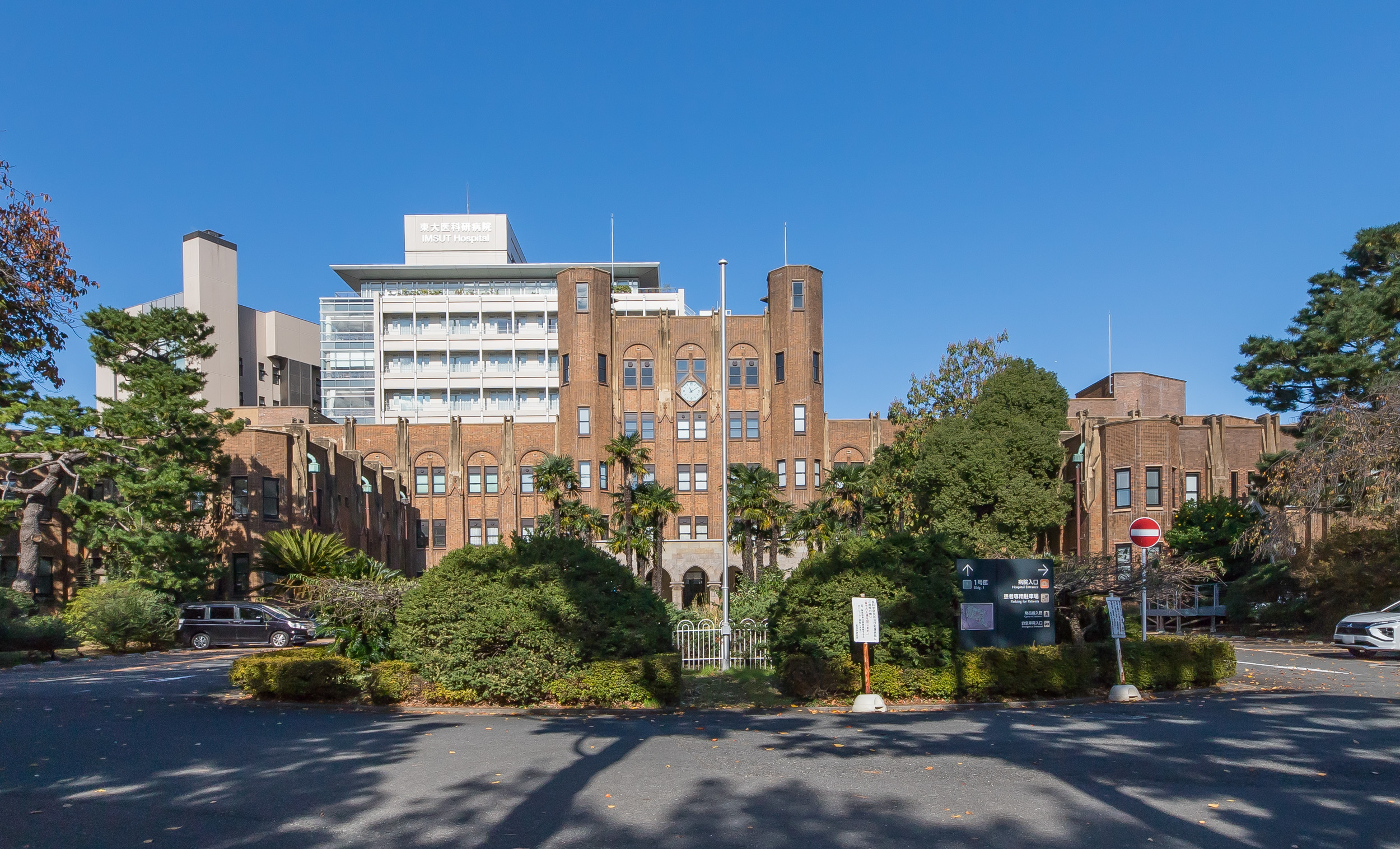
The Institute of Medical Science First Building

- Hongō Campus:
  - Yasuda Auditorium
  - General Library
  - University Hospital: East Clinical Research Building, First Research Building, Internal Medicine Building, Administration and Research Building
  - Faculty of Arts and Letters Building Nos. 1, 2
  - Faculty of Law Building No. 3
  - Faculty of Medicine Building Nos. 1, 2
  - Faculty of Engineering Building Nos. 1, 2, 3, 4, 6
  - Faculty of Science Building No. 2
  - Faculty of Agriculture Building Nos. 1, 2, 3
  - Tatsuoka Gate
  - Shichitoku Hall (martial arts, designated historical building)
  - Other
- Komaba I Campus: College of Arts and Sciences Building No. 1, Komaba Museum, other
- Komaba II Campus: Research Center for Advanced Science and Technology Building No. 1, 13, other
- Shirokanedai Campus: Institute of Medical Science, First Building
- Botanical Gardens, School of Science

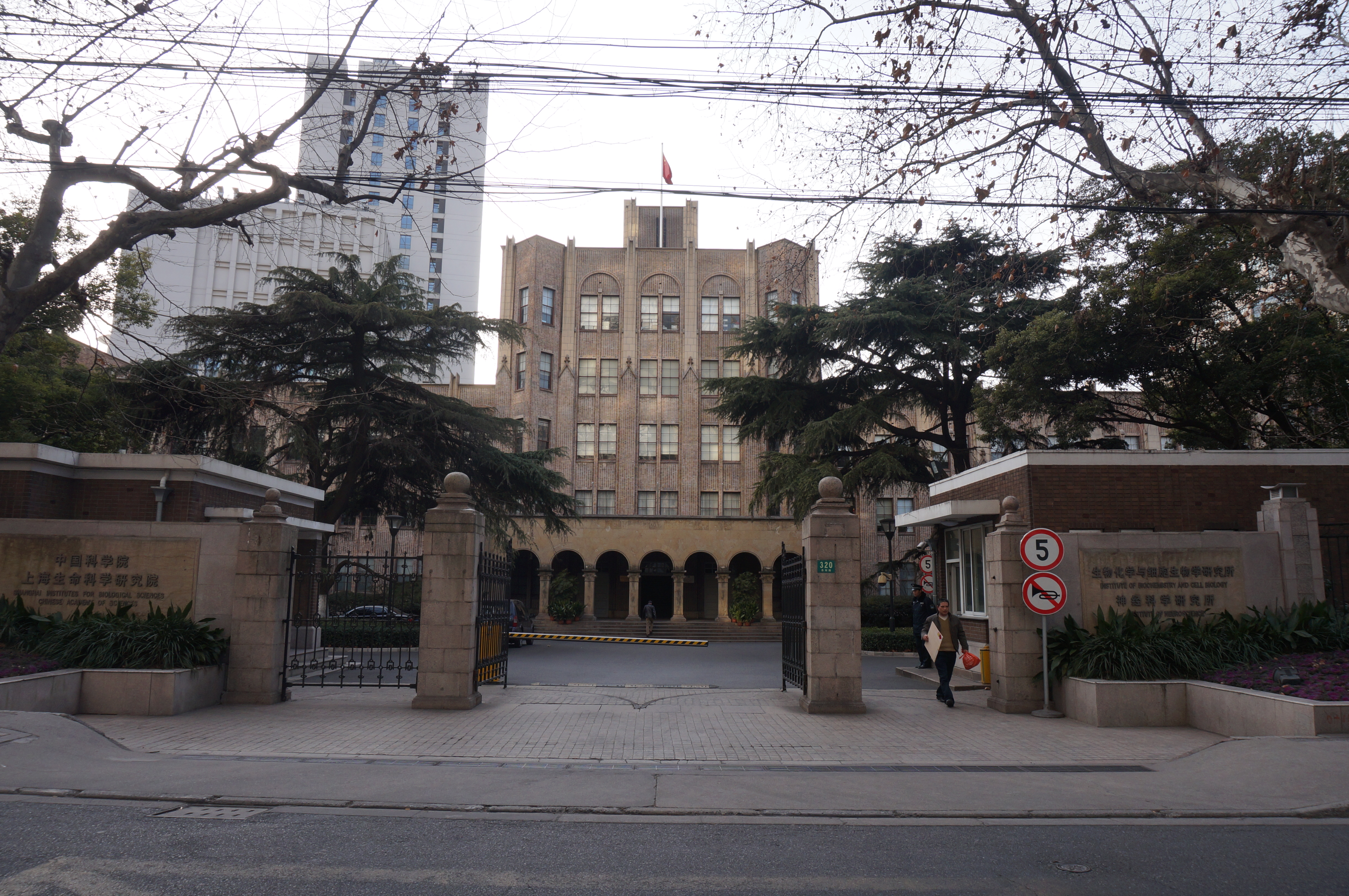
Shanghai Institute of Science

=== Other ===
- Tokyo University of Agriculture and Technology, Faculty of Agriculture
- Takushoku University International Education Hall (Bunkyō, Tokyo)
- Tenri High School, as part of the Oyasato-yakata (Tenri, Nara)
- Yokufūkai Main Building (Suginami, Tokyo, designated historic building)
- Own house (Minato, Tokyo, since demolished)
- Institute of Public Health
- Shanghai Institute of Science (currently Shanghai Institutes for Biological Sciences, Main Building)
- Sompo Japan Building
- Headquarters of the Norinchukin Bank (now DN Tower 21)
