= University of Tokyo Hospital =

Coordinates: 35.7117°N 139.7654°E

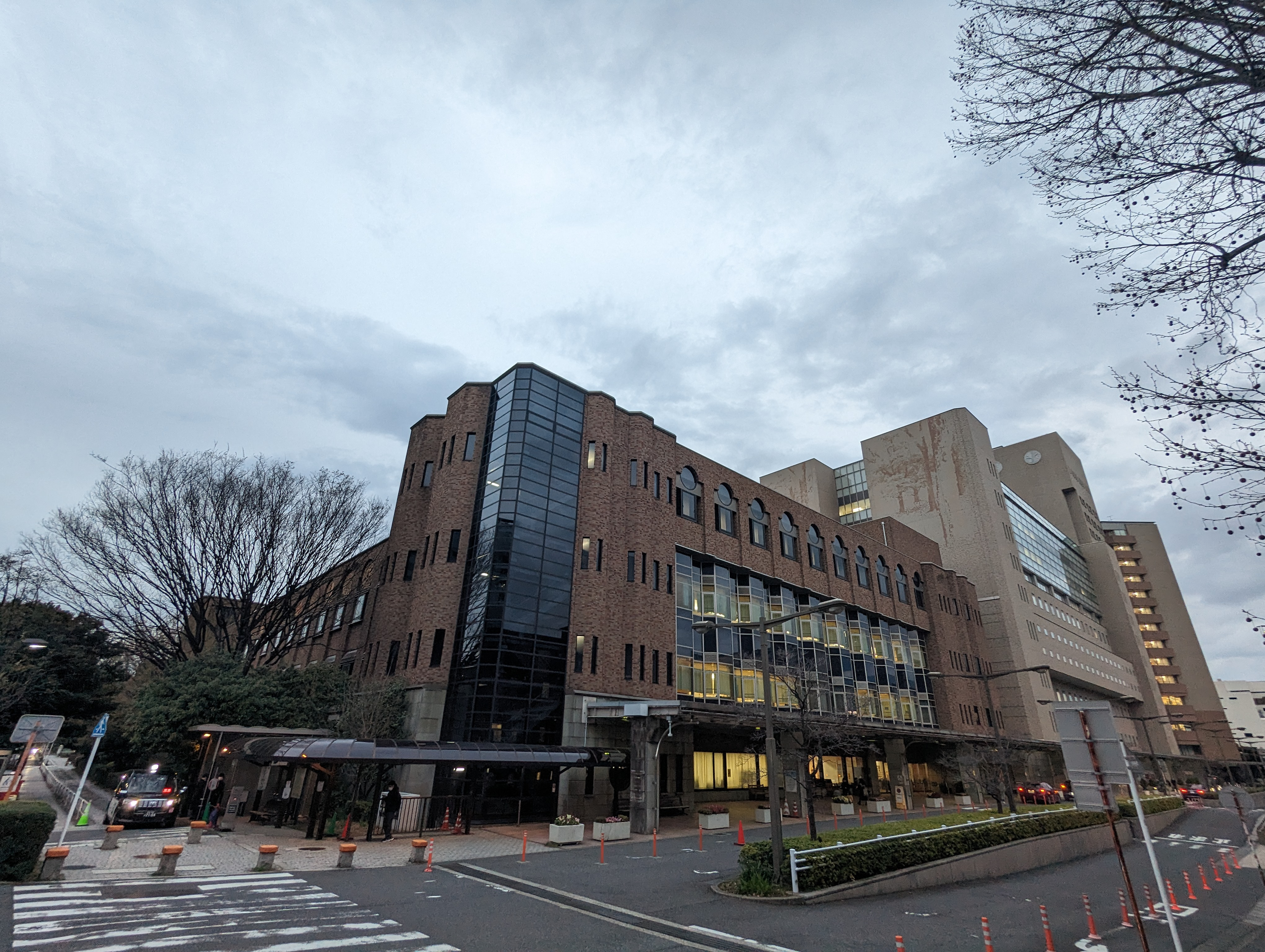
- The hospital seen from the south

Geography
- Location: Hongō campus, University of Tokyo; 7-3-1 Hongo, Bunkyō, Tokyo, Japan

Organisation
- Type: Teaching
- Affiliated university: University of Tokyo

Services
- Emergency department: Yes
- Beds: 1,264

Helipads
- Helipad: Yes
Number	Length		Surface
Number	ft	m	Surface
1			Concrete

History
- Former name: Kanda Otamagaike Vaccination Centre
- Opened: 1858

Links
- Website: https://www.h.u-tokyo.ac.jp/english/

The University of Tokyo Hospital (東京大学医学部附属病院, Tōkyō daigaku igakubu fuzoku byōin) is an academic health science centre and tertiary referral hospital located in Bunkyō, Tokyo, Japan.

== Overview ==
The hospital is part of the University of Tokyo's Faculty of Medicine. It is one of the country's fifteen core clinical research hospitals, which are hospitals that also serve as medical research centres with large government grants.

It has consistently been ranked as the best hospital in the country in several hospital rankings. Newsweek's World's Best Hospitals 2023 ranks it 17th in the world, 2nd in Asia, and 1st in Japan. Notably, it serves as the primary hospital for the Imperial Family of Japan, with both the current emperor and the emperor emeritus having undergone major operations there.

== Departments ==
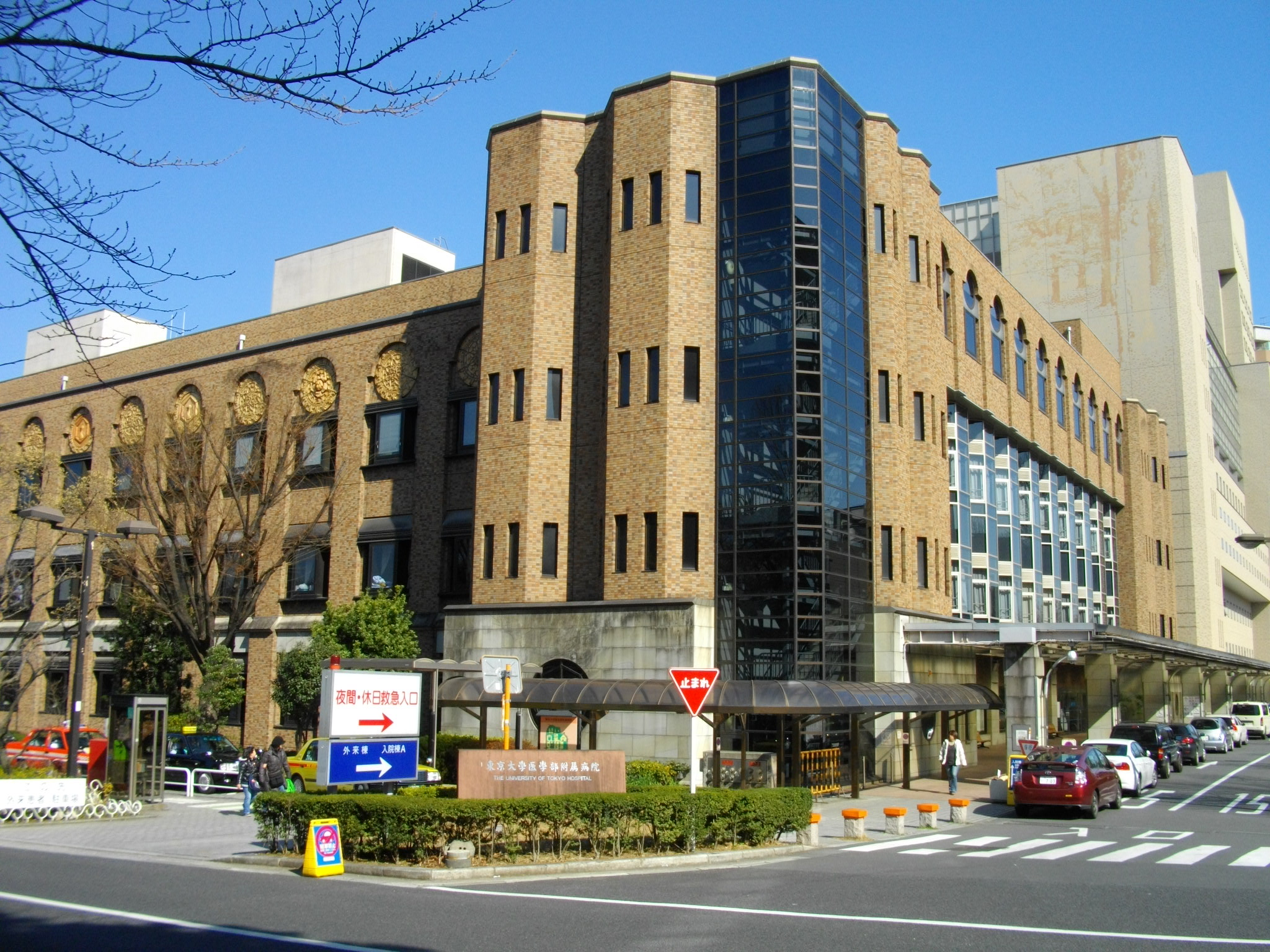
Outpatient Clinic Building

The hospital is organised as below:

- Internal Medicine Departments
  - General Internal Medicine
  - Cardiology
  - Respiratory Medicine
  - Gastroenterology
  - Nephrology & Endocrinology
  - Diabetes & Metabolism
  - Hematology & Oncology
  - Allergy & Rheumatology
  - Infectious Diseases
  - Neurology
  - Geriatric Medicine
  - Psychosomatic Medicine
- Surgical Departments
  - General Surgery
  - Stomach & Esophageal Surgery
  - Colorectal & Anal Surgery
  - Liver, Bile Duct, & Pancreatic Surgery
  - Vascular Surgery
  - Breast & Endocrine Surgery
  - Artificial Organ & Transplant Surgery
  - Cardiac Surgery
  - Thoracic Surgery
  - Neurosurgery
  - Anesthesiology & Pain Centre
  - Urology & Men's Health
  - Women's Surgery
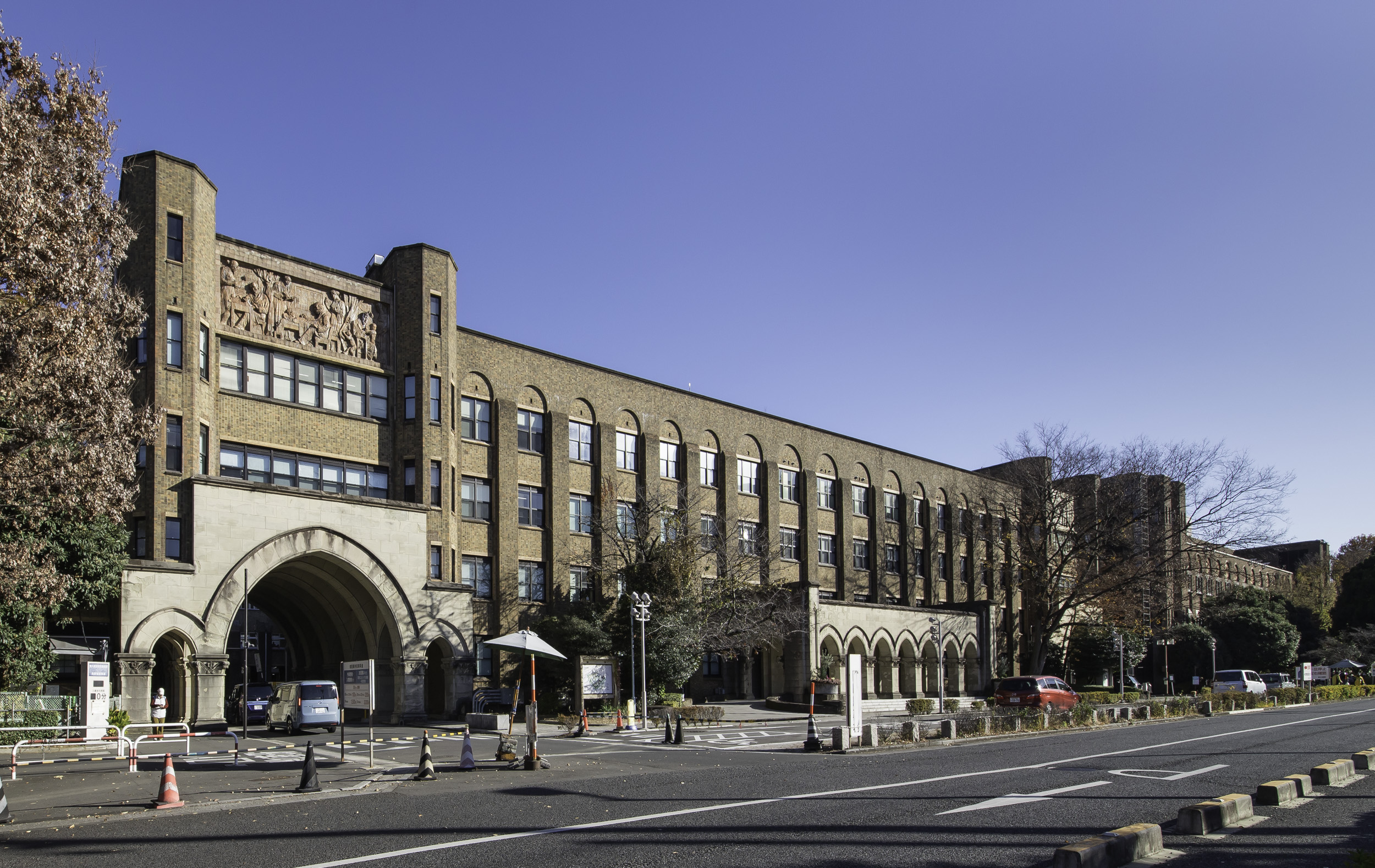
- First Research Building
  Sensory & Motor Functions Departments
  - Dermatology
  - Ophthalmology & Vision Correction
  - Orthopedic Surgery & Spinal Surgery
  - Otorhinolaryngology & Head and Neck Surgery
  - Rehabilitation
  - Plastic & Cosmetic Surgery
  - Oral and Maxillofacial Surgery & Orthodontics
- Pediatrics, Perinatal & Women's Health Departments
  - Pediatrics
  - Pediatric Surgery
  - Gynecology & Obstetrics
- Psychiatry and Neurology Departments
  - Psychiatry and Neurology
- Radiology Departments
  - Radiology
- Emergency Departments
  - Emergency Medicine
