= Hideto Kishida =

Japanese architect

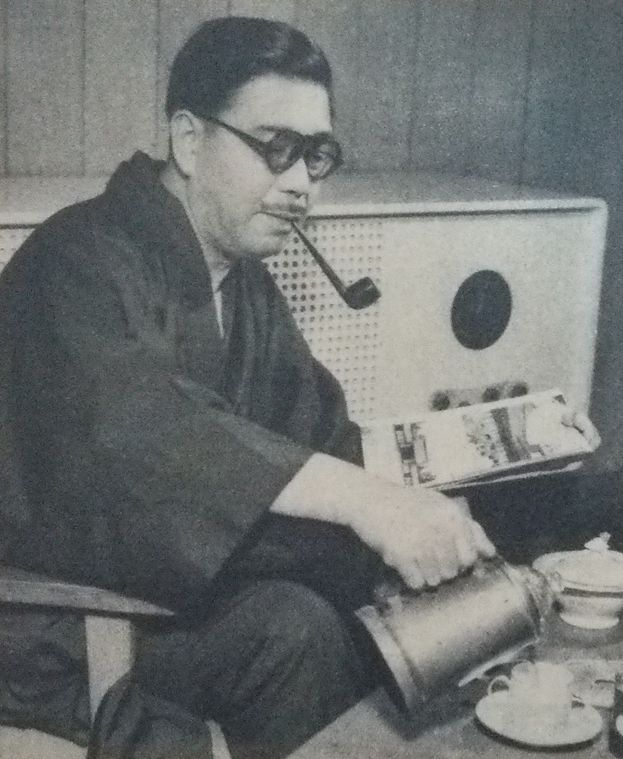
- Hideto Kishida in 1951
- Born: 6 February 1899; Fukuoka, Japan
- Died: 3 May 1966 (aged 67); Yamanakako, Japan
- Education: University of Tokyo
- Occupation: Architect

Hideto Kishida (6 February 1899 – 3 May 1966) was a Japanese architect. His work was part of the architecture event in the art competition at the 1936 Summer Olympics.

== Life ==
Kishida was born in Tottori into a samurai family in 1899. After graduating from the Department of Architecture, which is part of the Faculty of Engineering at the University of Tokyo, he continued his tenure there as a lecturer. Kishida obtained a doctorate of engineering in 1929 from this institution and later became a professor there. Among his notable designs over this period are Yasuda Auditorium and Faculty of Science Building No. 1 (now since demolished), both located on the Hongo Campus of the university. With his supervisor Yoshikazu Uchida, he worked on the reconstruction of the university after the devastating damage from the Great Kanto Earthquake.

His teachings had a great influence on pioneers in the field of architecture, including Kenzo Tange, Kunio Maekawa, Michizo Tachihara, Ryuichi Hamaguchi, Takashi Asada, and many more, who were enrolled in the Kishida Laboratory at the University of Tokyo.

== Works ==
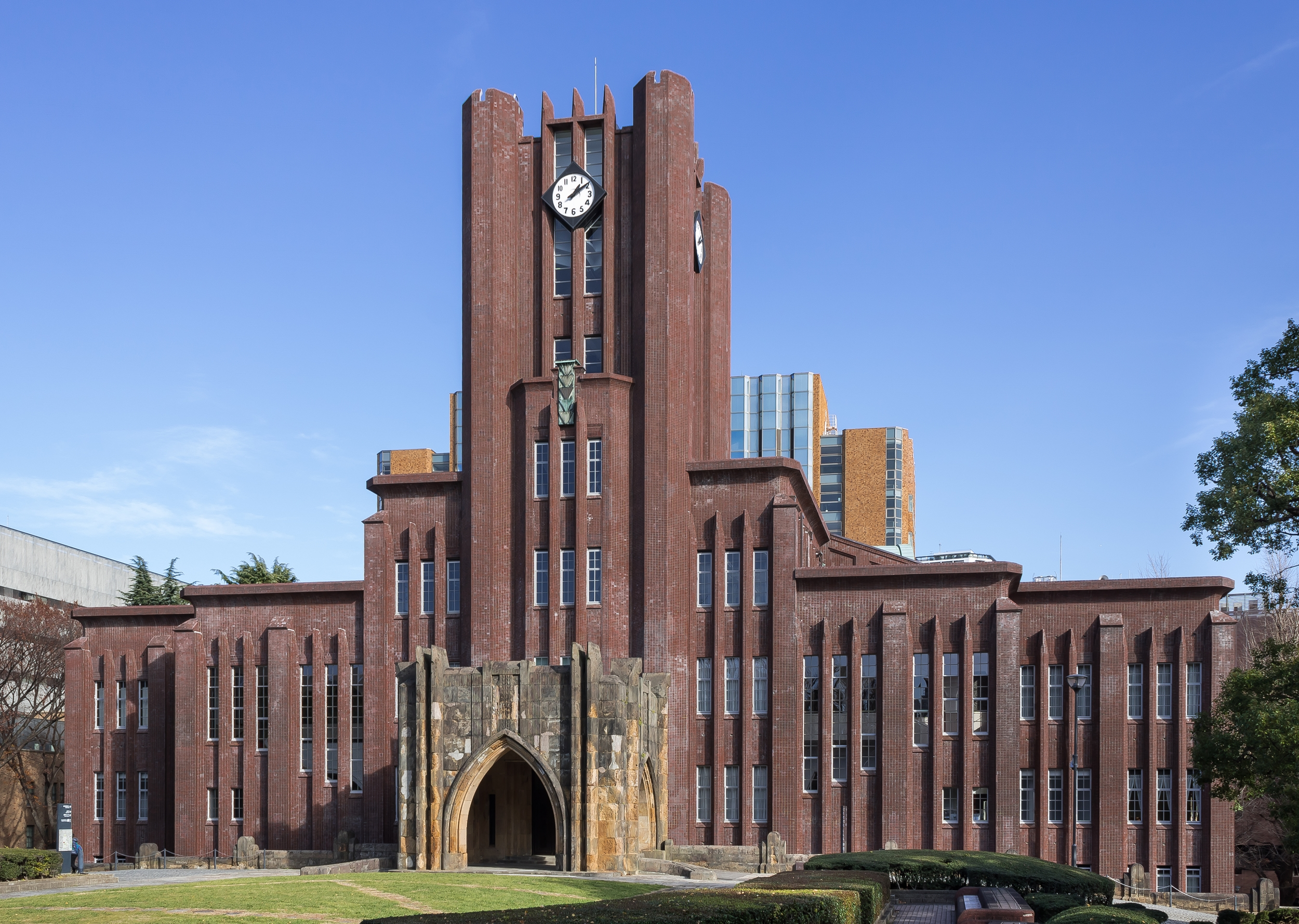
Yasuda Auditorium, 1925

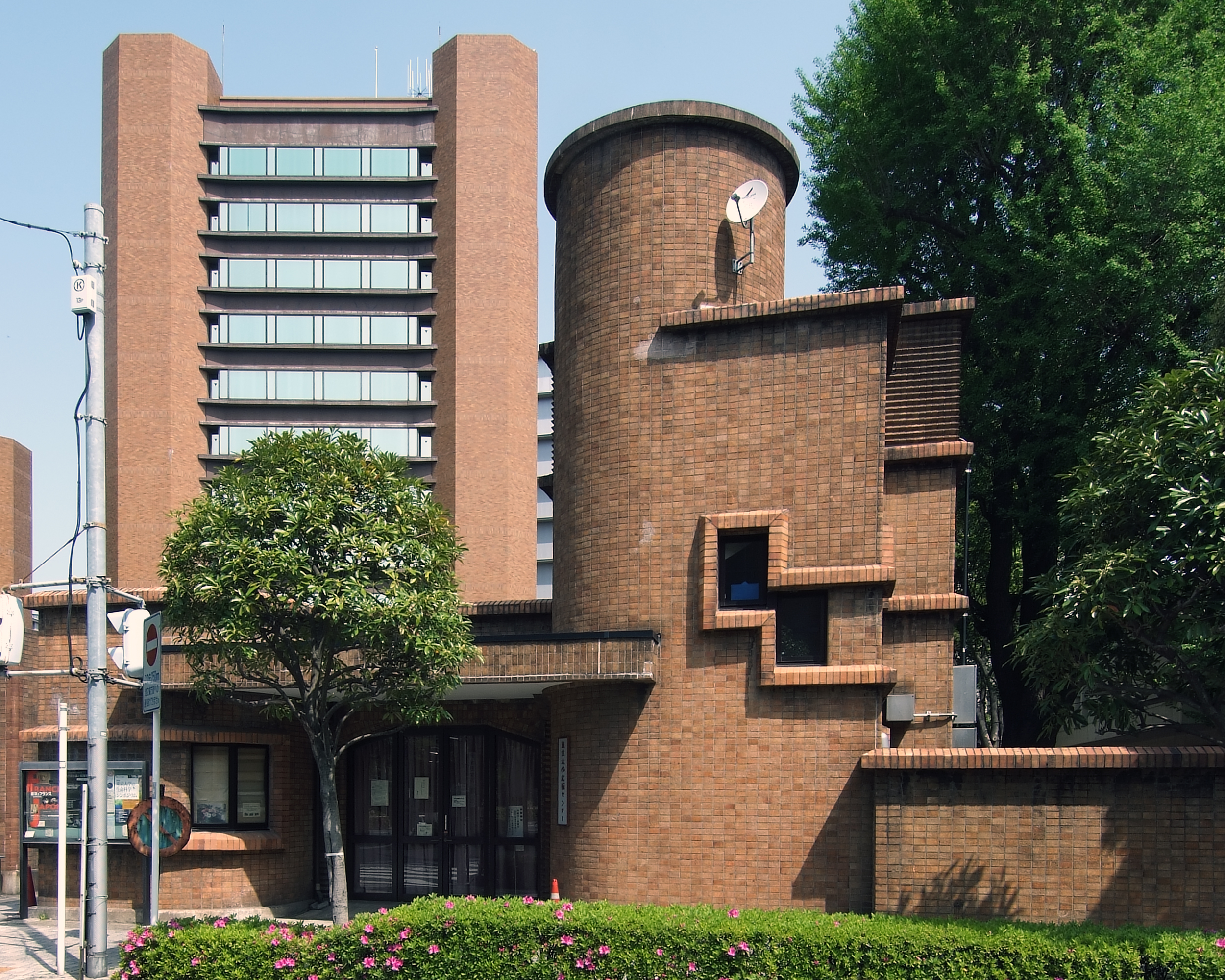
Visior's centre, University of Tokyo (1926)

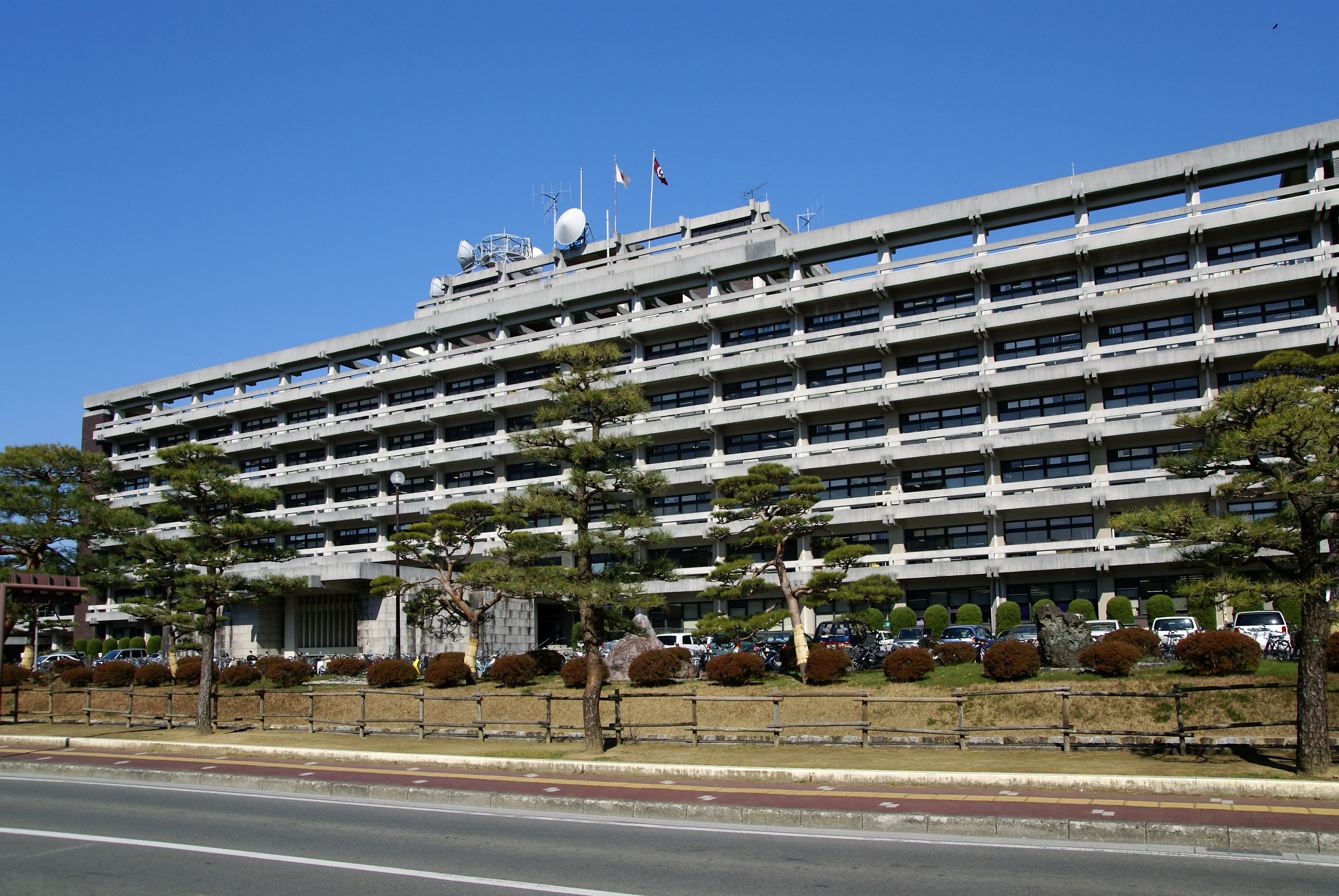
Kochi Government Office (1962)

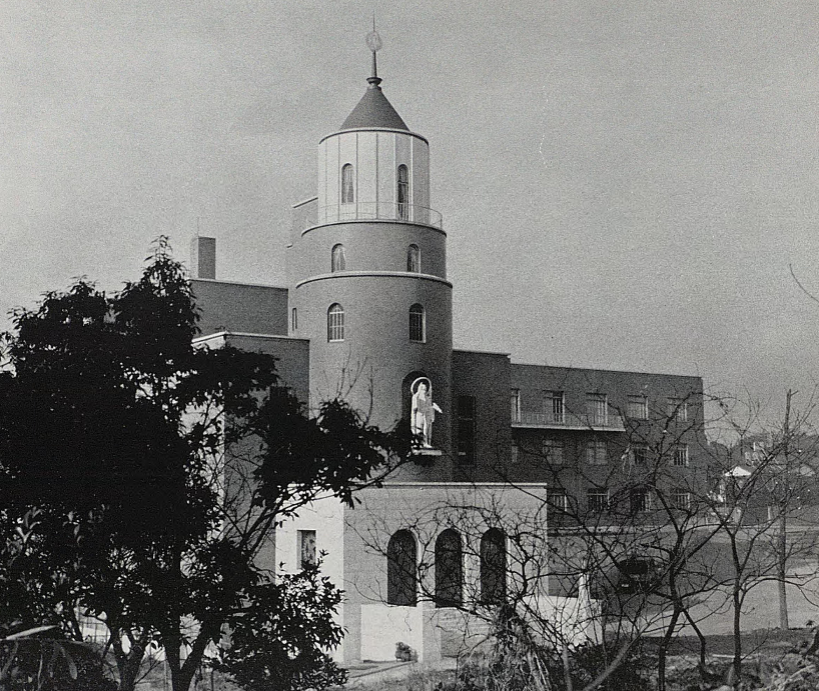
Seichō no Ie headquarters (1954)

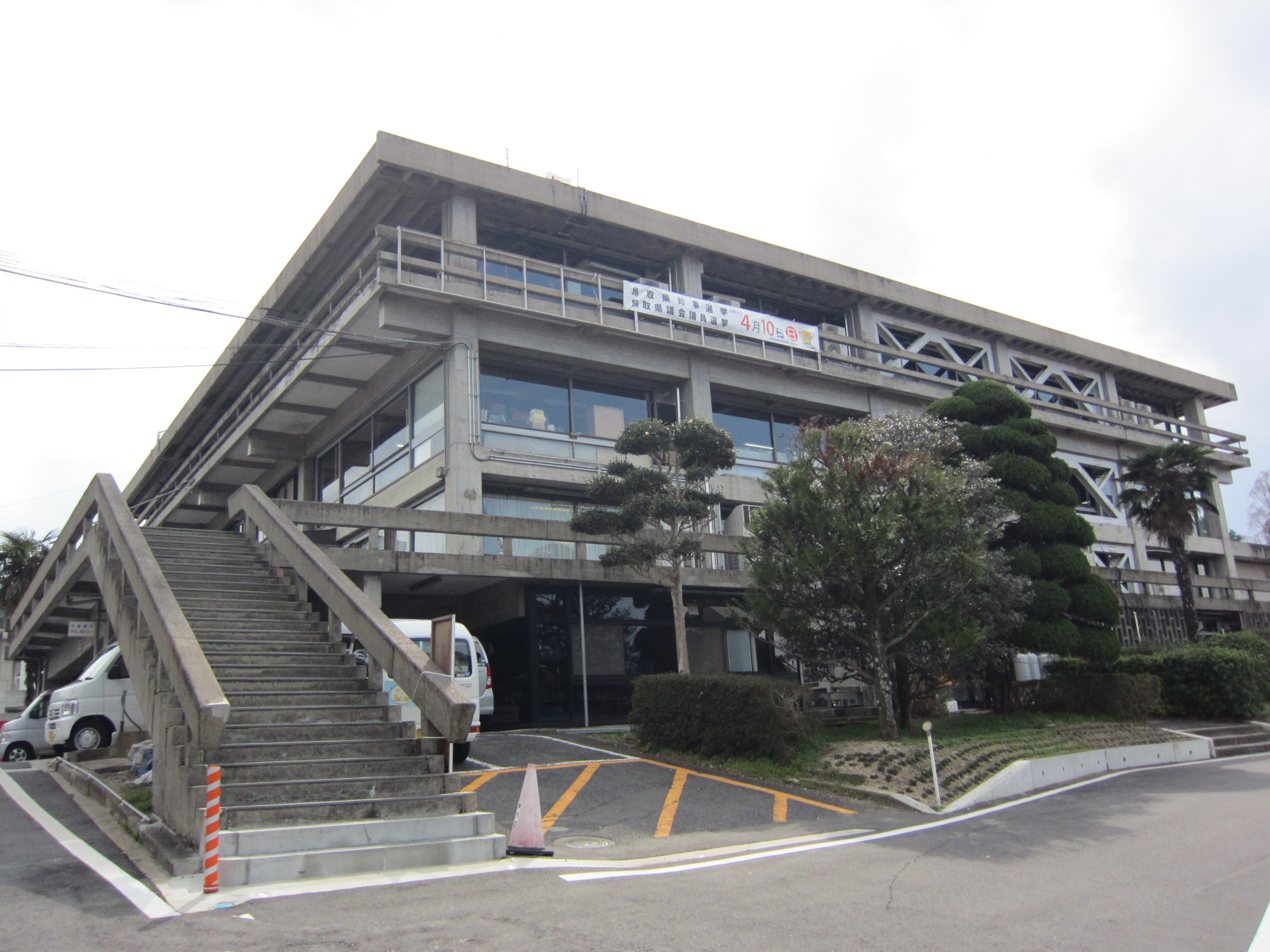
Kurayoshi City Hall (1957, collaboration with his student Kenzo Tange)

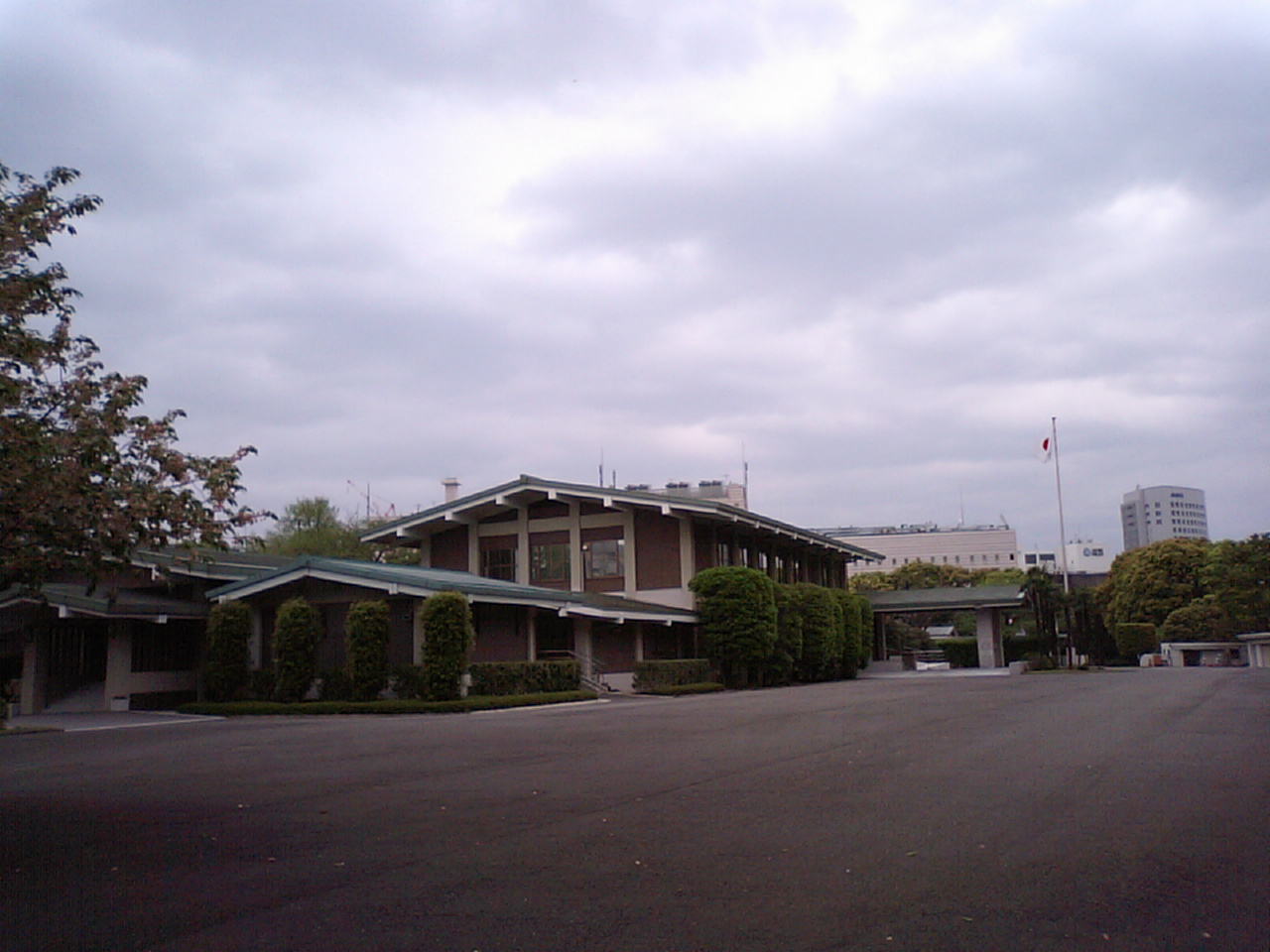
Official Residence of the Speaker of the House of Councilors (1961)
