= Sompo Japan Building =

Skyscraper located in Tokyo

Sompo Japan Head Office Building
- 損保ジャパン本社ビル
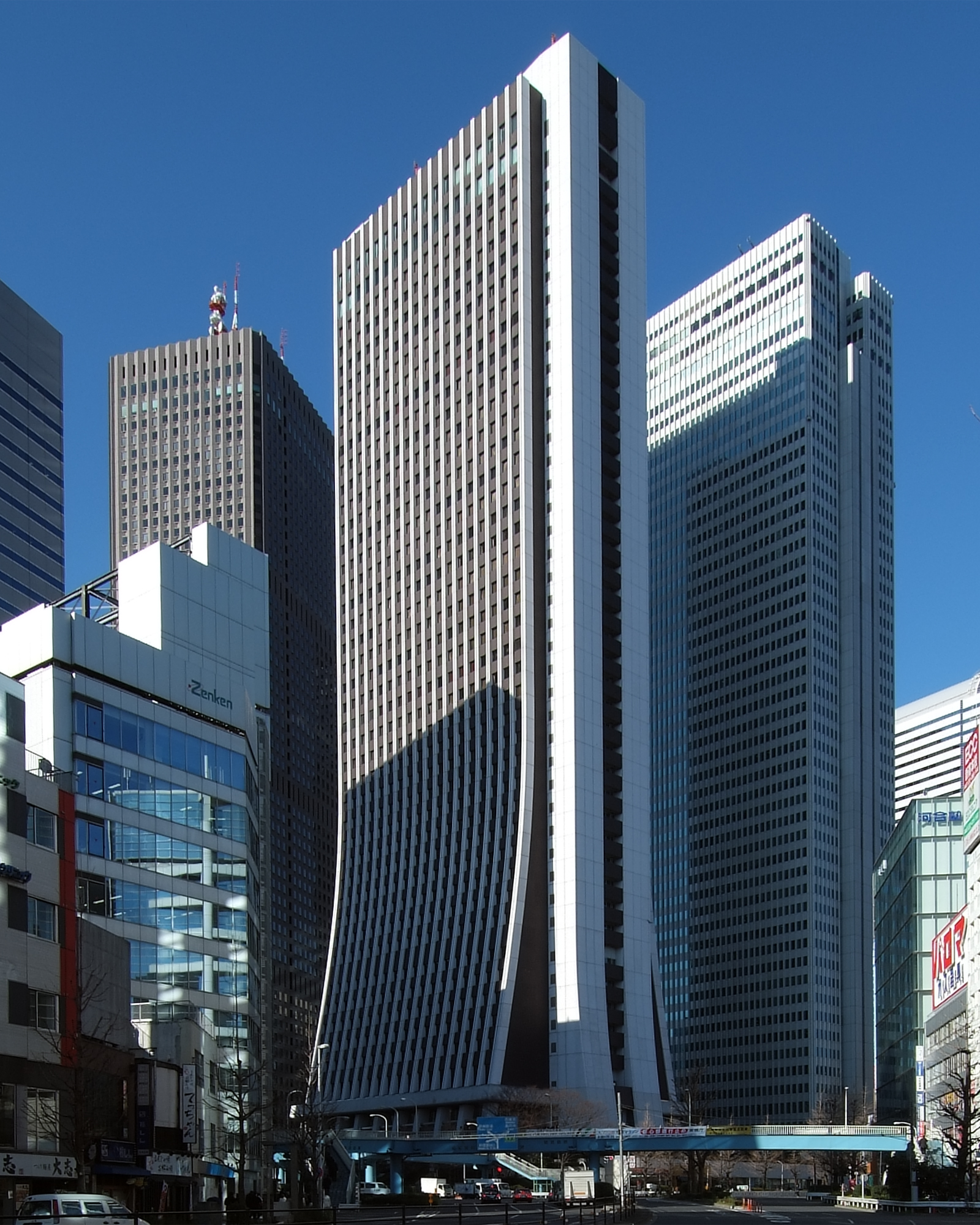
- Interactive map of the Sompo Japan Head Office Building area

General information
- Status: Completed
- Location: 1-26-1 Nishi-Shinjuku; Shinjuku, Tokyo, Japan
- Coordinates: 35°41′33.8″N 139°41′46″E
- Construction started: 1973
- Completed: 1976
- Owner: Sompo Japan

Height
- Antenna spire: 200 meters (660 ft)
- Roof: 193 meters (633 ft)

Technical details
- Floor count: 43 above ground 6 below ground
- Floor area: 166,768 m^{2} (1,795,100 sq ft)

Design and construction
- Architect: Yoshikazu Uchida
- Main contractor: Taisei Corporation; Shimizu Corporation

The Sompo Japan Head Office Building (損保ジャパン本社ビル, Sonpo Japan Honsha Biru) is the corporate headquarters for Sompo Japan Insurance. It is located in the district Nishi-Shinjuku in Shinjuku, Tokyo, Japan. At 200 meters (656 ft), the building is the 28th tallest building in Tokyo and the 33rd tallest in Japan. It was designed by Yoshikazu Uchida.

On the street level is Seiji Togo Memorial Sompo Japan Museum of Art, where one of Vincent van Gogh's "Sunflowers" series of paintings is located.

The building is similar in appearance to Chase Tower. The building made an appearance in the 1984 film The Return of Godzilla.
