= Katei Watanabe =

Japanese writer

Watanabe Katei (渡辺 霞亭; 18 December 1884 – 7 April 1926) was a Japanese writer who wrote many popular novels under the pen names Hekirurien, Kuroboshi, Ryokuensho, among others. His extensive collection of Japanese fiction from the Edo period is now housed at University of Tokyo Library.

== Works ==
- Sofuren (想夫憐 "Sympathy of mutual love" – the title is from the name of a piece of Japanese classical music) 1903
- Uzumaki ("Whirlpool") – filmed several times
