= Yasuda Auditorium =

Building at the University of Tokyo

- 安田講堂 東京大学大講堂
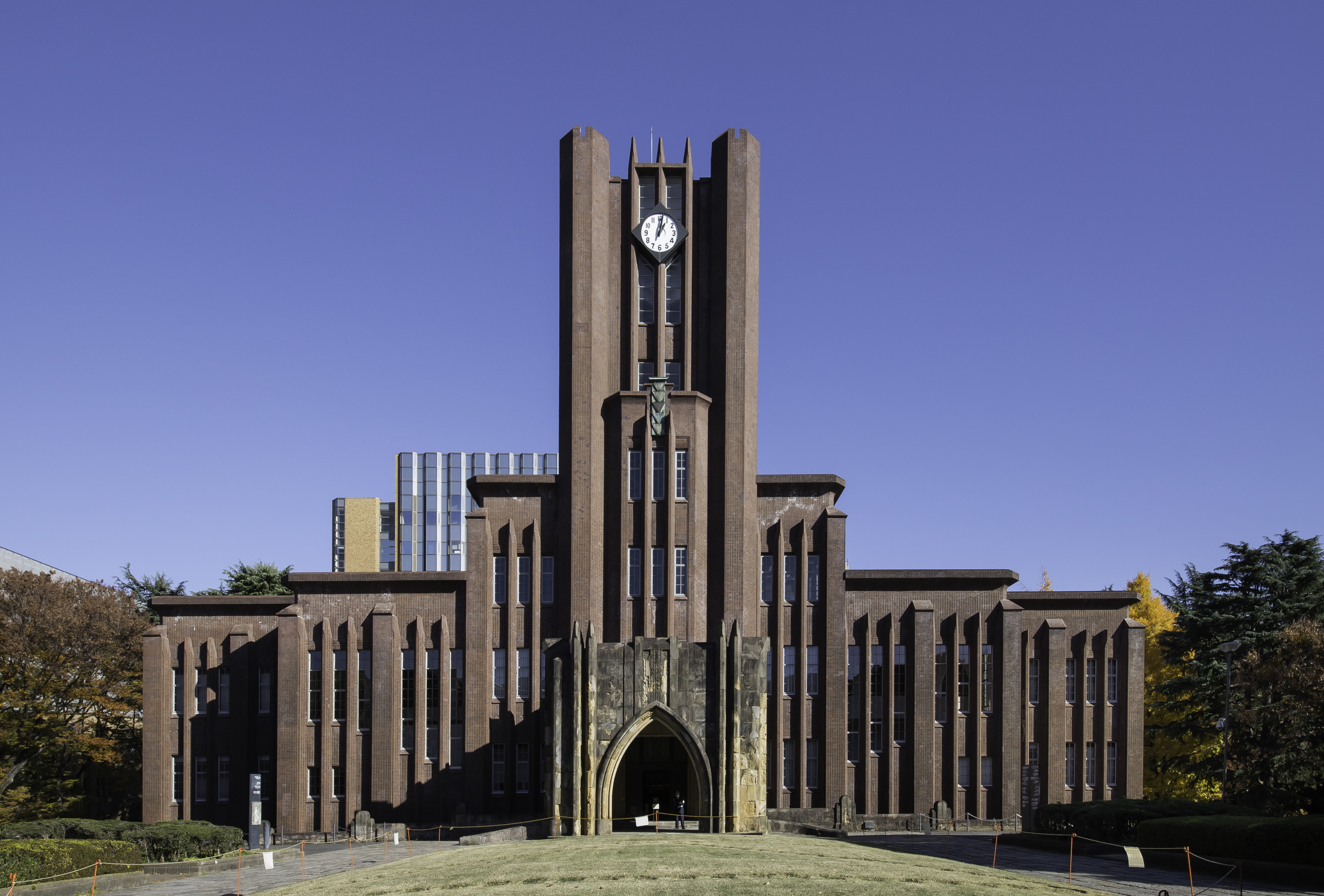
- Yasuda Auditorium as seen from the front
- Interactive map of the Yasuda Auditorium area
- Alternative names: Yasuda Hall

General information
- Architectural style: Gothic Revival
- Location: Hongō, Bunkyō-ku, Tokyo, Japan
- Coordinates: 35°42′47.999″N 139°45′42.999″E
- Named for: Yasuda Zenjiro
- Opened: 1925
- Affiliation: University of Tokyo

Technical details
- Floor count: 8
- Floor area: 6,990 square meters

Design and construction
- Architects: Yoshikazu Uchida, Hideto Kishida
- Main contractor: Shimizu Corporation

Yasuda Auditorium (安田講堂, Yasuda kōdō) is a building and clock tower at the center of the Hongō campus of the University of Tokyo. It serves as the central symbol of the campus, where special events and graduation ceremonies are held.

== History ==
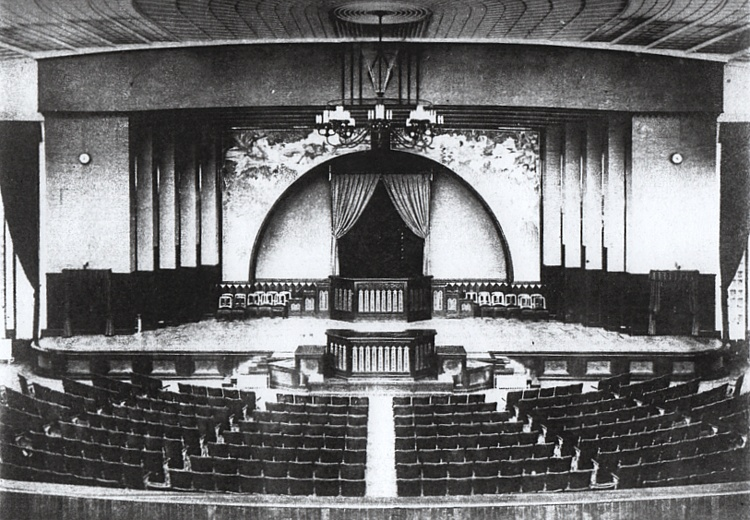
Interior view of the auditorium in 1932

The building was completed in 1925 with a donation from businessman Yasuda Zenjirō, who intended for the building to be a binden (a place the Emperor of Japan could stay). The building was designed by architects Yoshikazu Uchida and Hideto Kishida, the latter of whom was an expressionist. During the Second World War, in October 1940, the auditorium was the site of a special celebration of the anniversaries of the Imperial Rescript on Education and of the establishment of the Imperial Family of Japan in power.

During the 1968-69 Japanese university protests, the building was occupied by student demonstrators – first in June 1968, when a dispute at the University of Tokyo Medical School led to medical students occupying the building and then being expelled from it soon after by riot police, and again starting in summer, when students barricaded themselves inside the building. Over the weekend of 18–19 January 1969, the protestors were cleared out of the building by riot police. After the protests, the Yasuda zaibatsu helped renovate the building. Since the protests, the building has never been used to commemorate entrance or graduation ceremonies, but it has become a symbol of the University of Tokyo.

== Architecture ==
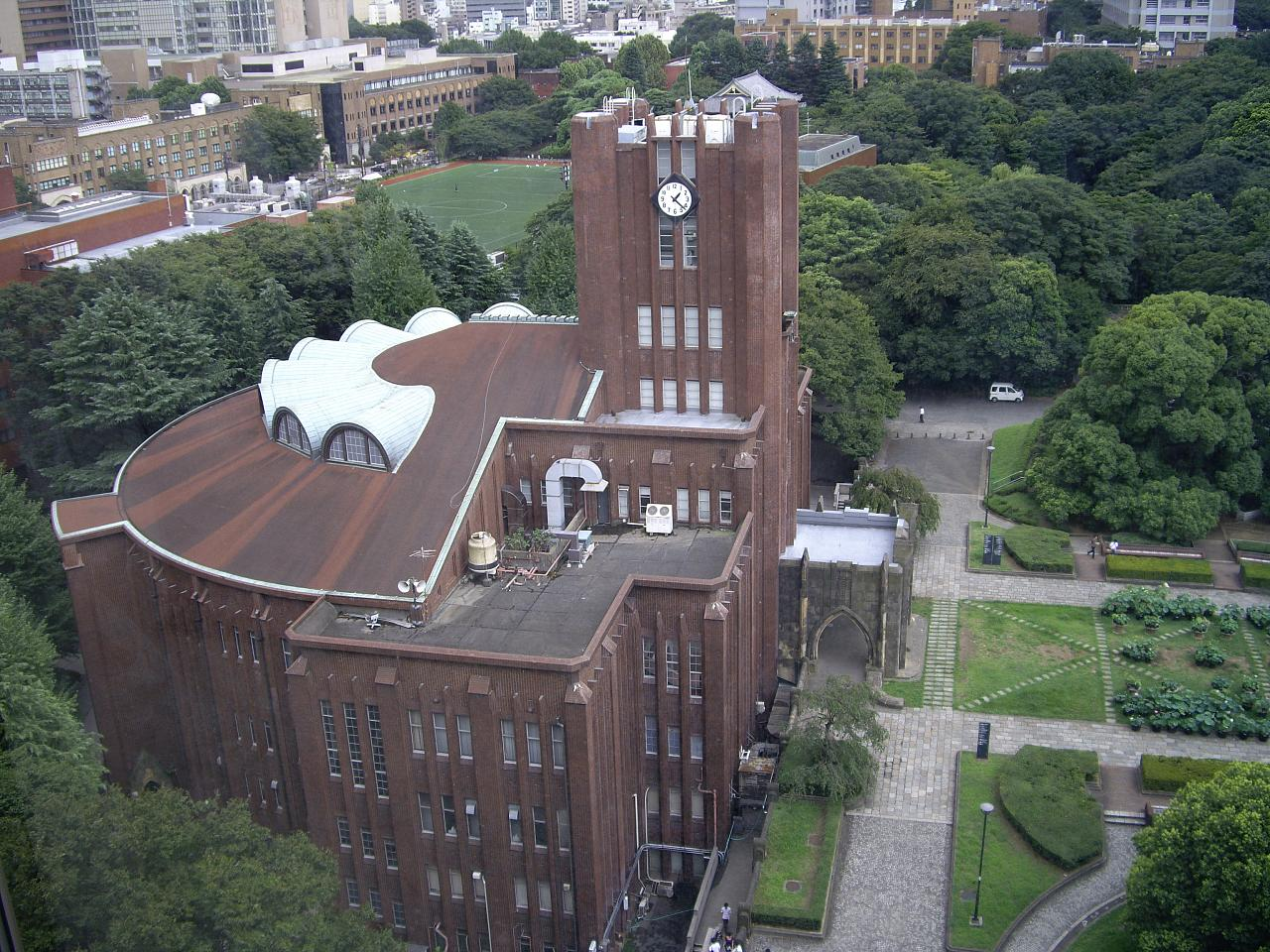
Yasuda Hall, Tokyo Daigaku

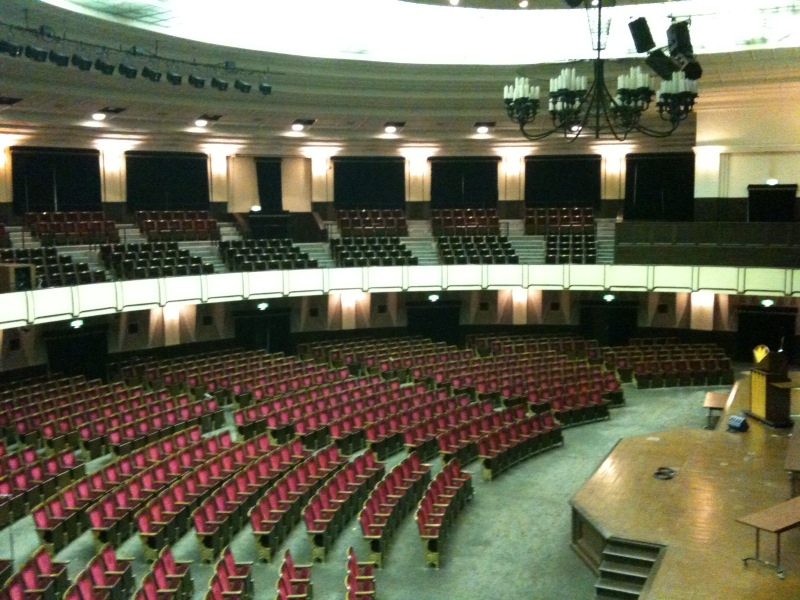
Interior pictured in 2009

The architecture of Yasuda Auditorium has been compared to that of the University of Cambridge's gate tower, which Uchida could have been inspired by. To the university, the building represents the modernization efforts of the University of Tokyo. The red-brick used in the building is indicative of the architecture in the period following the Great Kantō Earthquake of 1923. The building's architecture is part of the Gothic Revival school, a school of architecture new to Japan by the time the building was built. The prominence of the clock tower over the circular building has been described as "phallic".

The building includes an auditorium, central administrative offices for the university, and a room made specifically for the Emperor where he would wait to give special watches to all graduates.

== See also ==
- Sheldonian Theatre – Theatre in Oxford, England
