= Hongō campus =

University of Tokyo main campus

Coordinates: 35°42′45.7″N 139°45′42.4″E

Map

The Hongō campus (Japanese: 本郷キャンパス) is the main campus of the University of Tokyo. While some interdisciplinary and advanced research takes place at Komaba or Kashiwa, most faculties and institutes are located at Hongō. Most undergraduates in the senior division and postgraduates study on the campus.

The Hongo district campus is divided into three areas: Hongo, Yayoi, and Asano, which are referred to as the Hongo Campus, Yayoi Campus, and Asano Campus, respectively.

== History ==
=== Edo Period ===
Most of this area was part of the Tokyo (then Edo) palace of the Maeda Family (Kaga Domain). Other clans based in this regions were: the Toyama and Daishōji (which were cadet branches of the Maeda Family of Kaga) and the Mito and Anjihan (in the Yayoi and Asano campus area). During the Meiji Restoration, most of this land was taken over by the new government and became official land.

=== University of Tokyo Integration ===
In the Meiji era, in 1876, the Tokyo Medical School (the predecessor of the Faculty of Medicine) moved to the former site of the clan residence. By 1888 all five colleges or faculties that existed back then finished relocation to Hongo.

In 1889, next to UTokyo's campus in Hongo Yayoi-cho (Mukogaoka / current Yayoi area), the First Higher School was relocated from Hitotsubashi. The Maeda family retained a portion of their vast former estate in the southwest area, where the Marquess Maeda Toshitaka had a grand residence.

=== Present ===
In 1923, following the destruction of buildings and facilities by the Great Kanto Earthquake, relocating the campus to another area such as Yoyogi was considered, but eventually, it was decided that the University of Tokyo would remain in this district. In 1926, the university acquired land from the Maeda family, including the residence and gardens (the current sites of Kaiteikan, the university's reception venue), and in exchange, the Maeda family was given a part of the agricultural fields of the Faculty of Agriculture located in Komaba at that time, where they relocated their residence (now Komaba Park). The Faculty of Agriculture moved to the site in Yayoi, which had been occupied by the First Higher School. After the war, the First Higher School was integrated into UTokyo, and the Komaba Campus has since served as part of the university again.

== Gallery ==
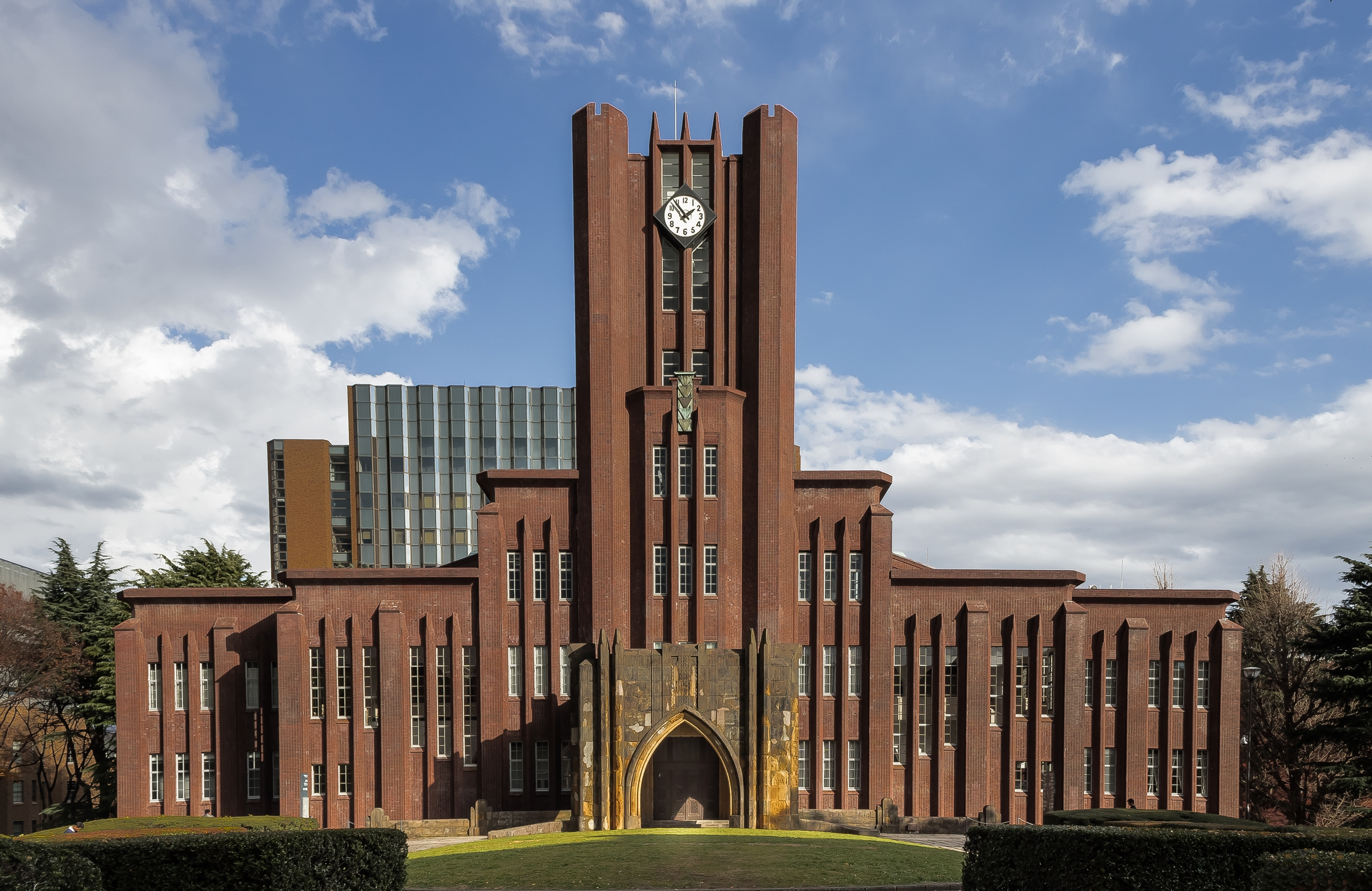
Yasuda Auditorium

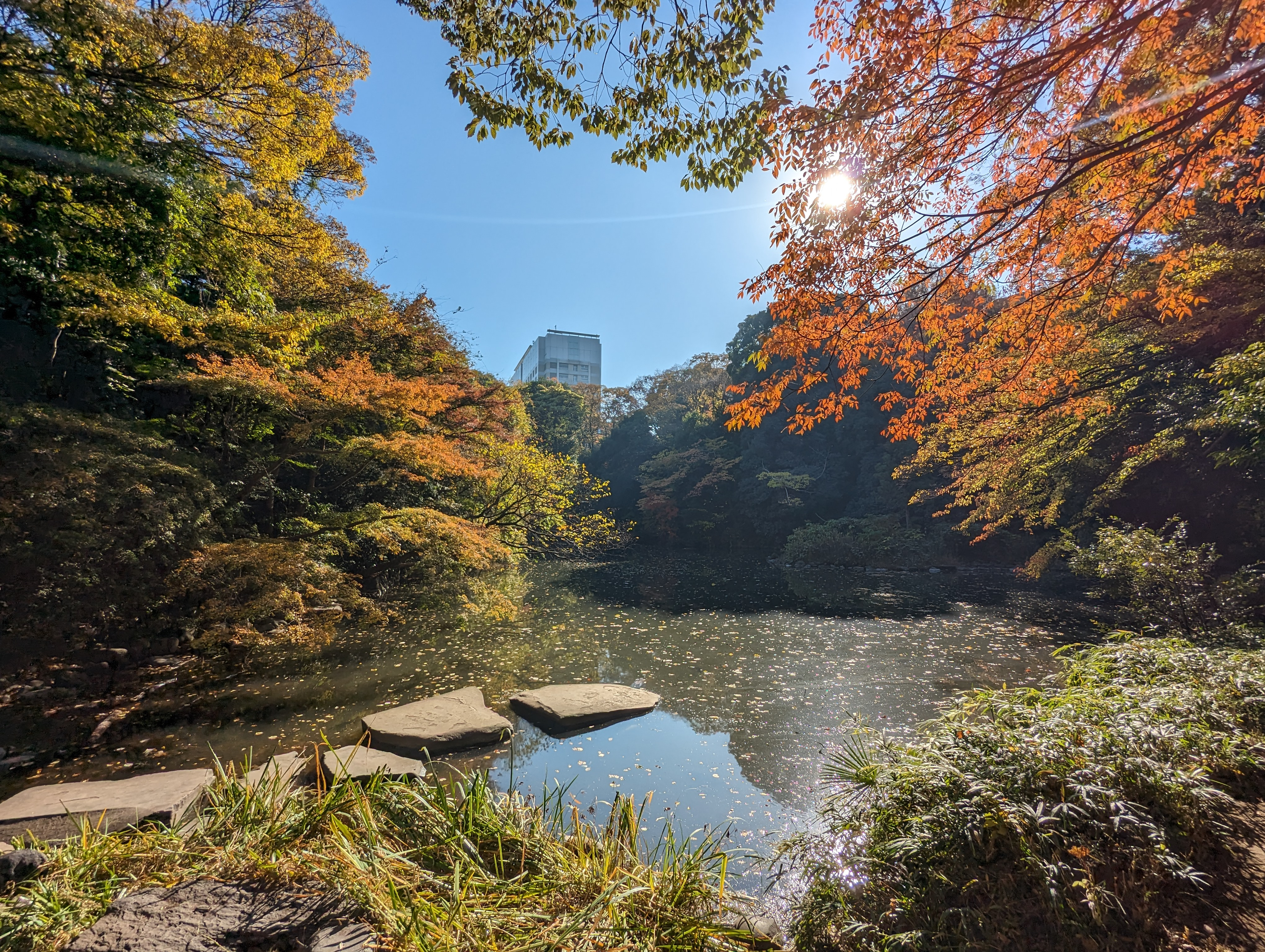
Sanshiro Pond

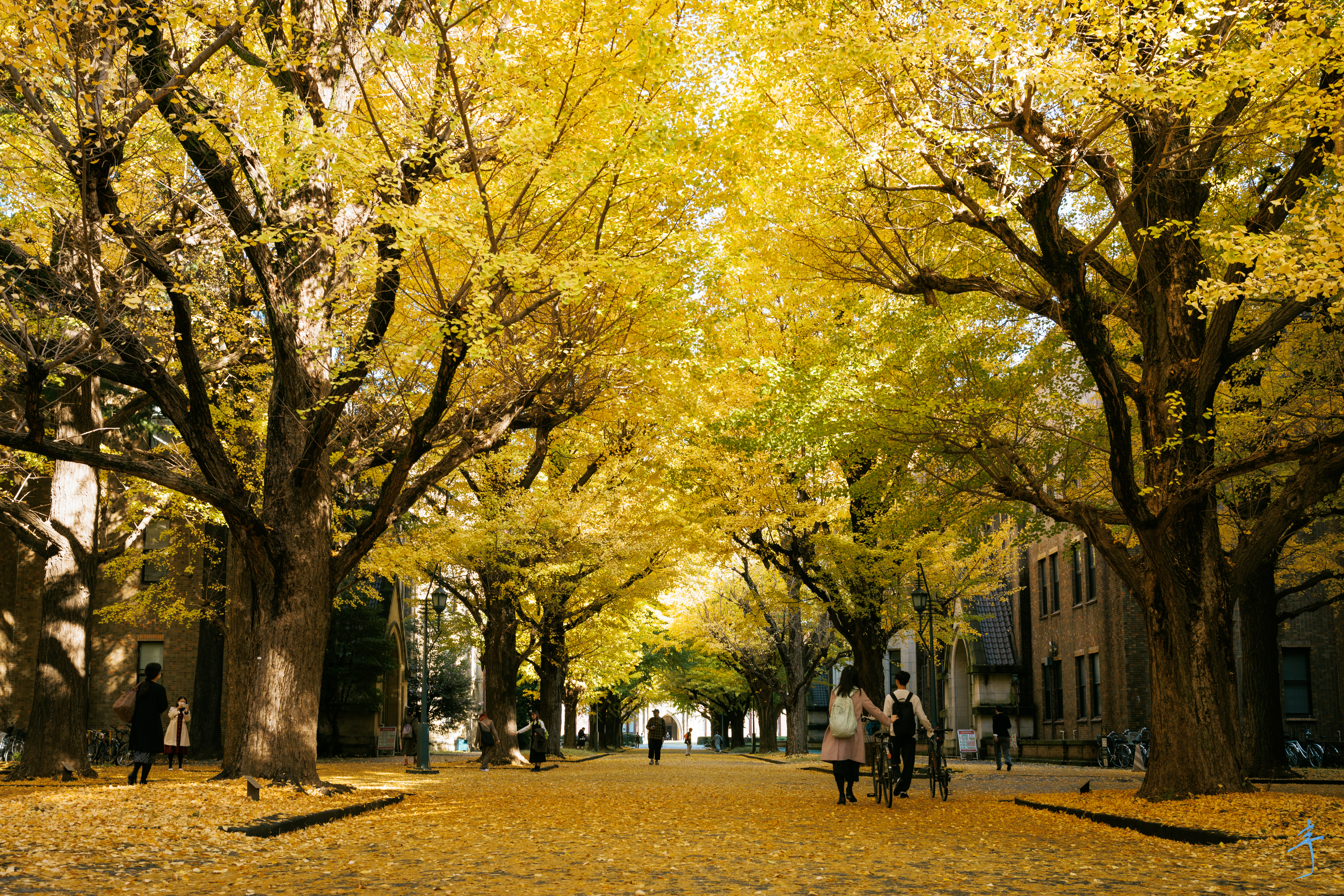
The campus in autumn

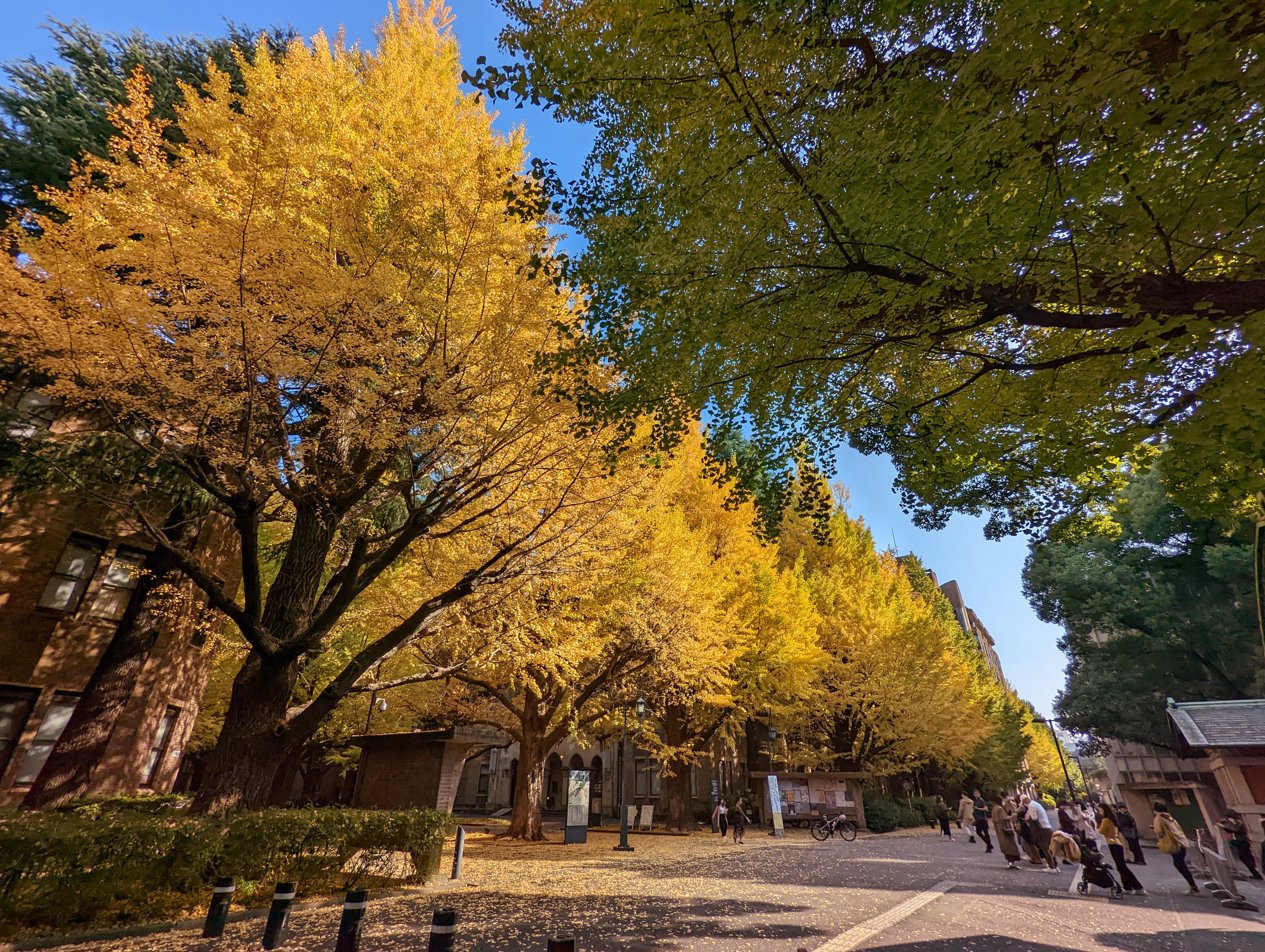
near the main entrance

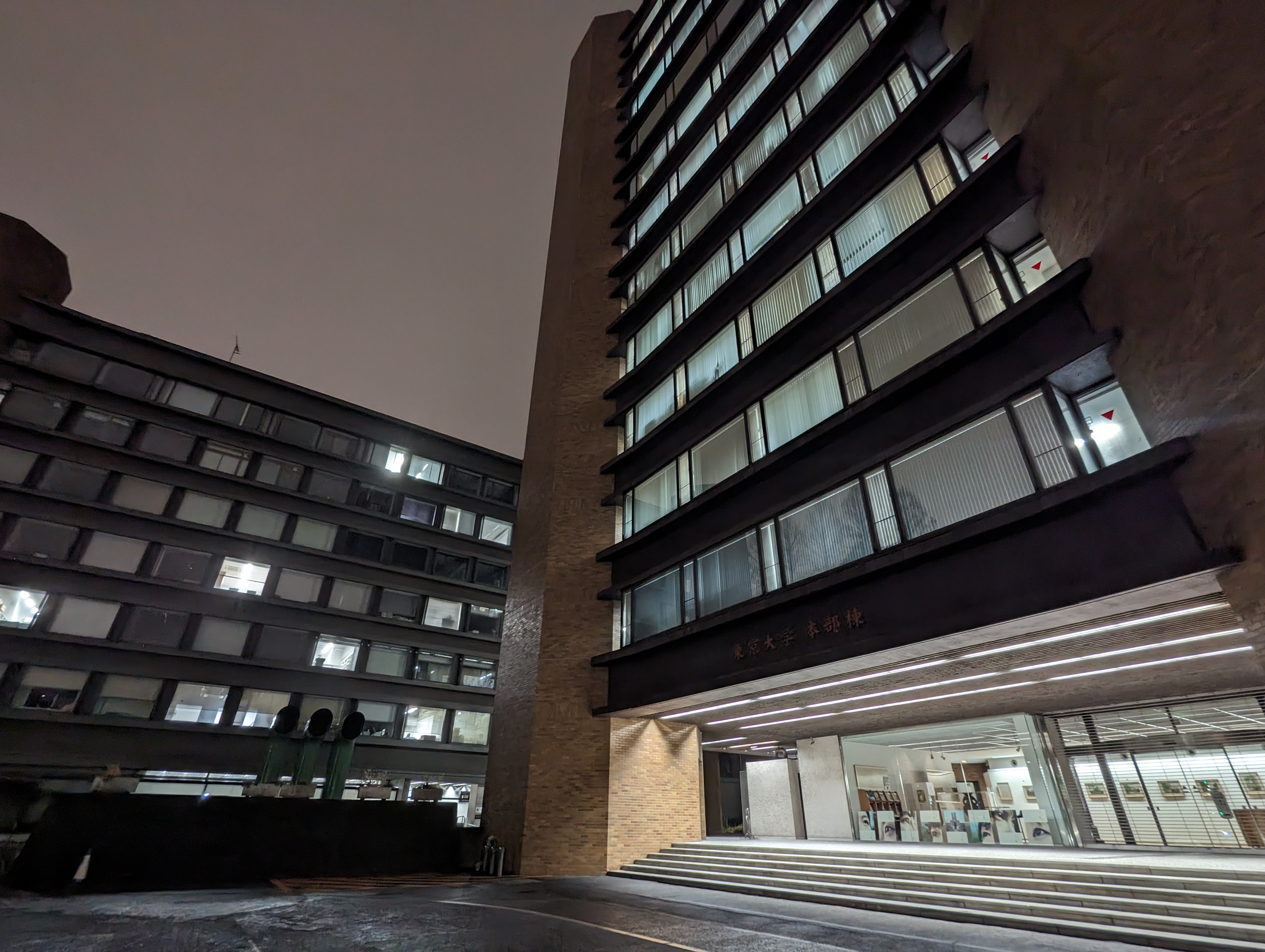
Administration building, Hongo Campus

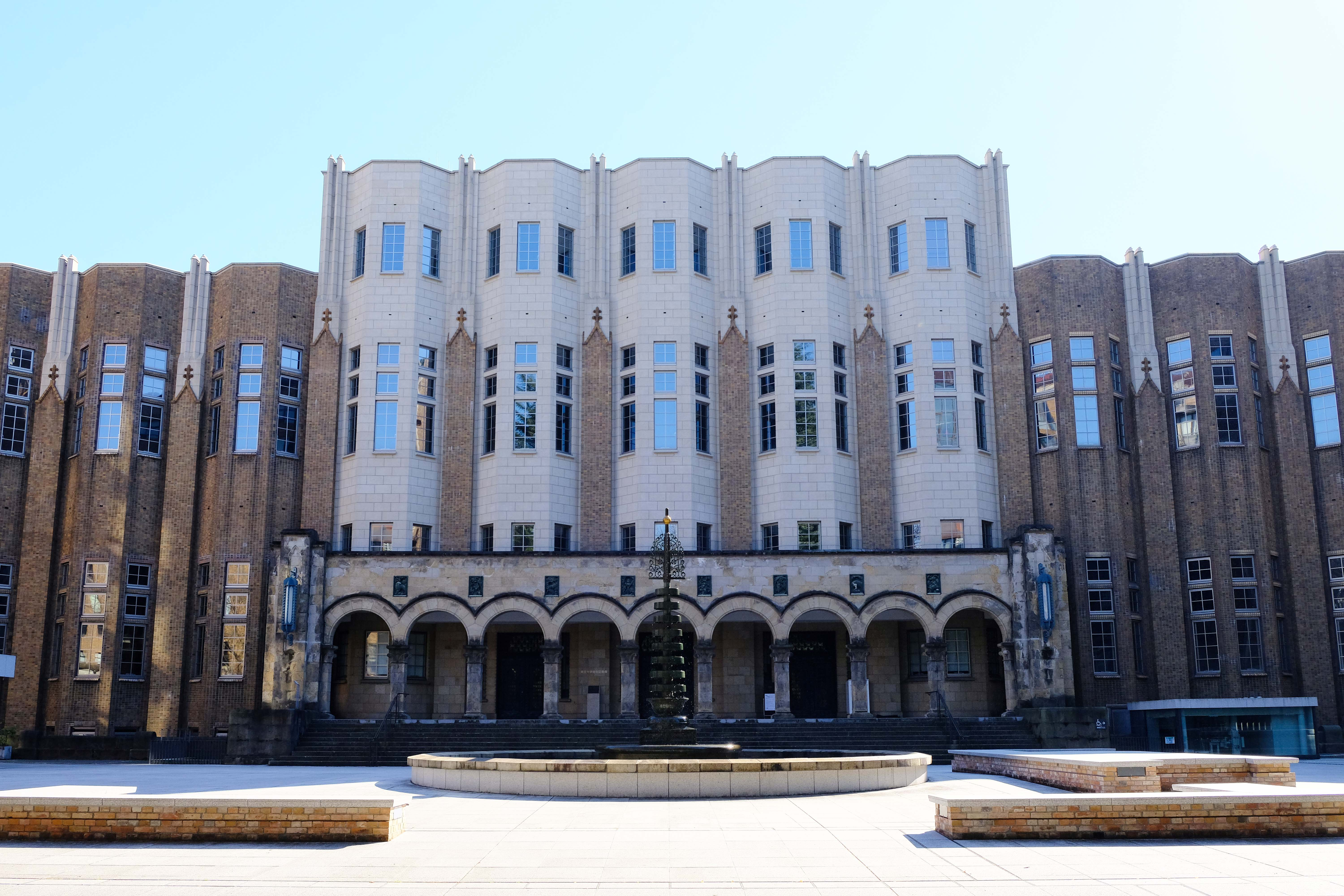
General Library

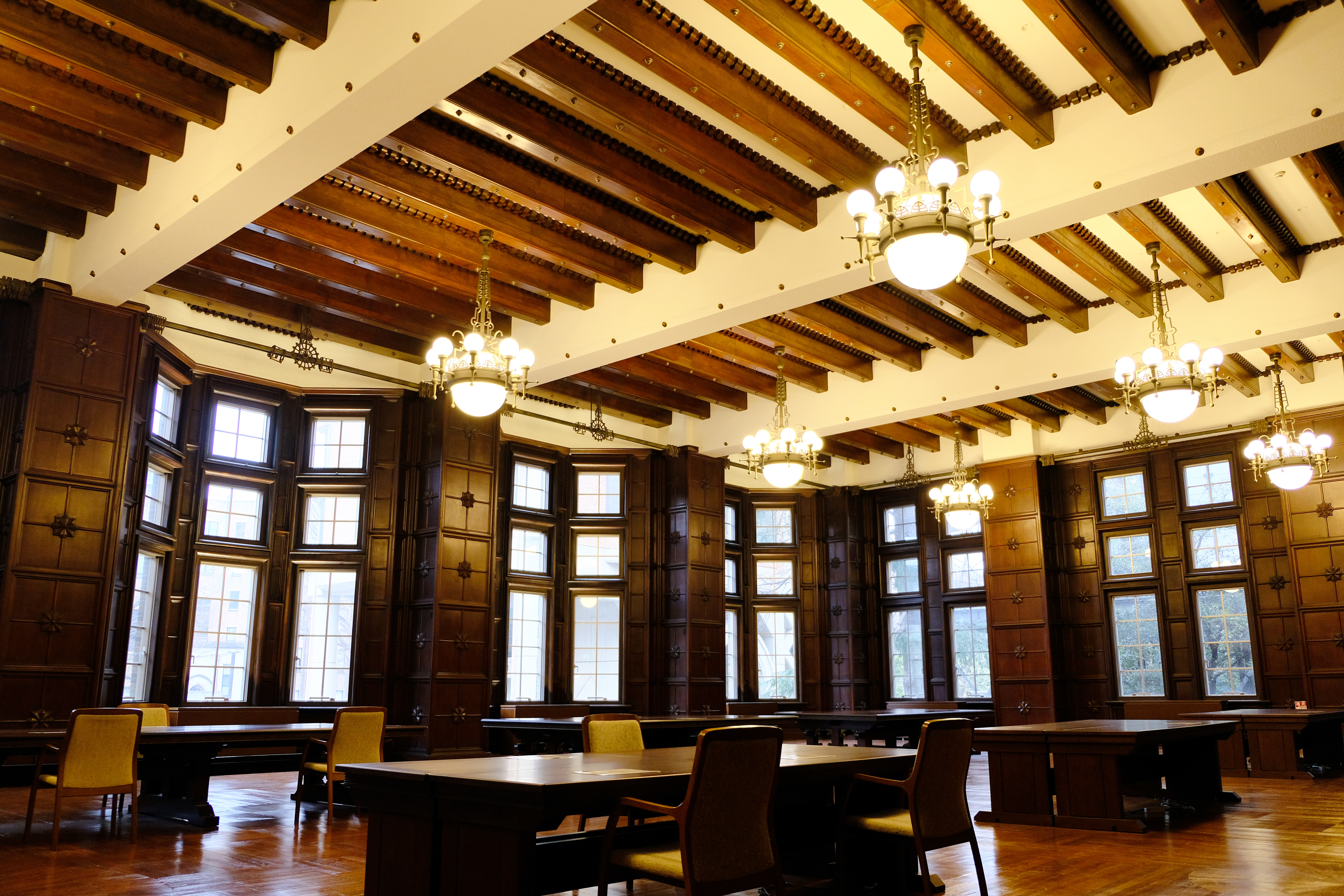
Inside of the General Library

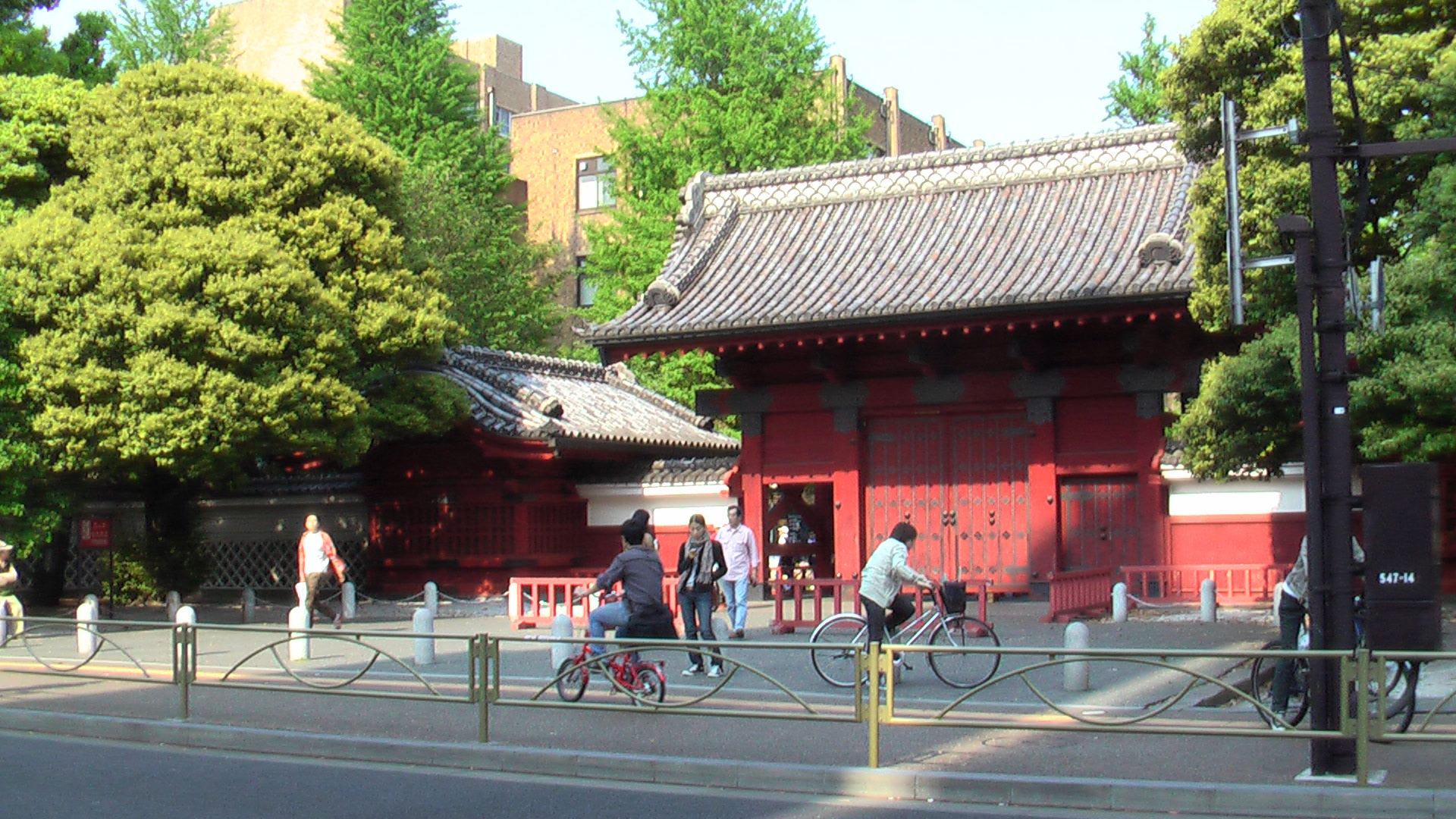
Akamon
