= University of Tokyo Library =

Japanese library

Coordinates: 35.7113954°N 139.7608459°E

The University of Tokyo Library is a term used to refer to the University of Tokyo (UTokyo) Library System, which consists of three comprehensive libraries located in each of the university's main campuses, and 27 field-specific libraries affiliated with faculties and institutes within UTokyo. As of March 2024, the UTokyo Library System owns a collection of over 10 million books and numerous materials of historical or scientific values, making it the second largest library in Japan. It is only surpassed by the National Diet Library, which stores approximately 12.11 million books.

== Comprehensive Libraries ==
=== General Library (Hongo) ===
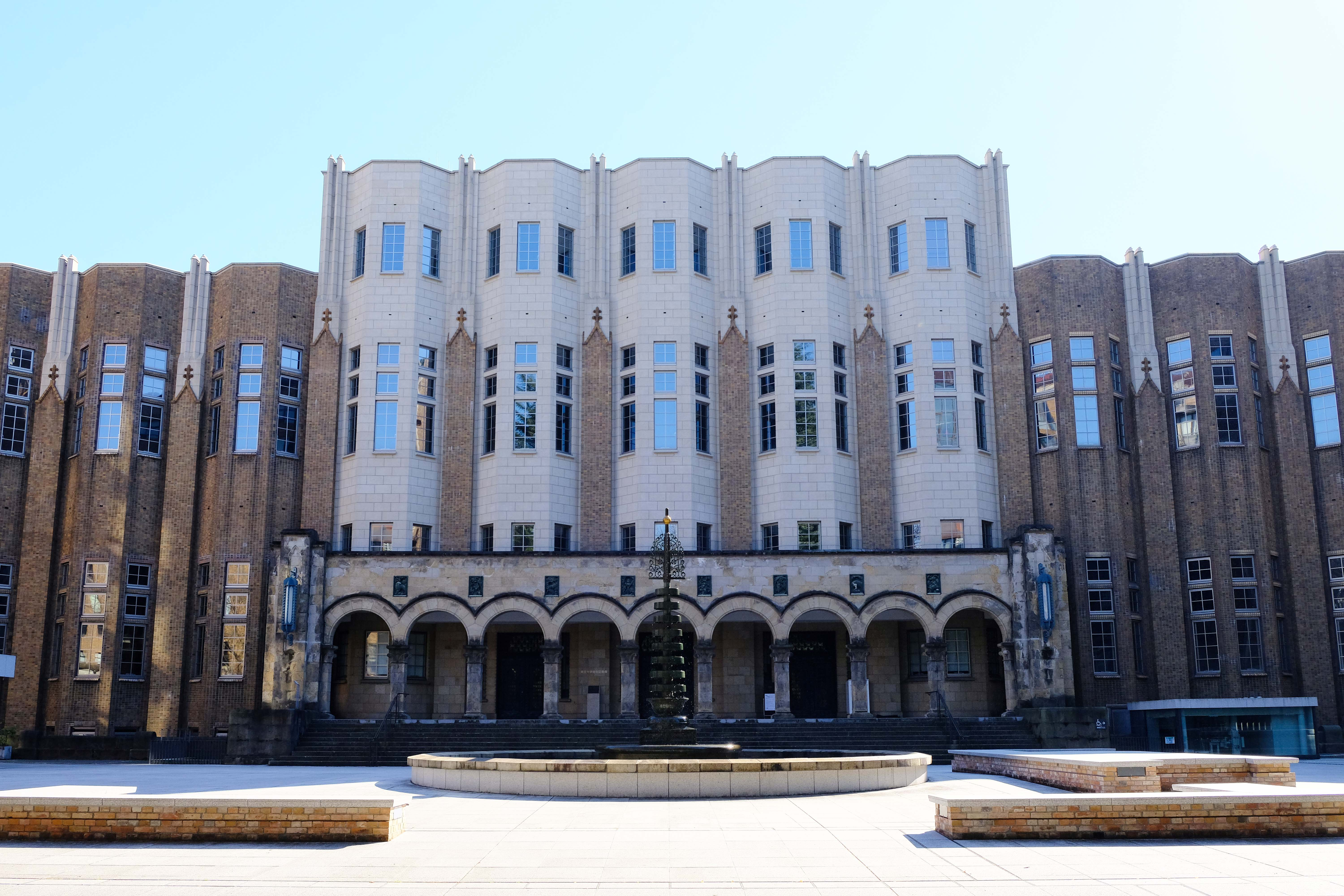
General Library

The General Library officially opened when UTokyo's predecessor institutions were reorganised to form UTokyo, the nation's first university, on 12 April 1877. However, its roots can be traced back to Edo-era libraries, such as the Bansho Shirabesho. It was relocated to its current location at Hongo in August 1884. Soseki Natsume's novel Sanshiro provides a detailed description of the library around this time.

On 1 September 1923, the original building was destroyed in the Great Kanto Earthquake, along with 750 thousand books from its collections. This loss included over 20 thousand books from Friedrich Max Müller's collections and Takizawa Bakin's handwritten scripts. The library's reconstruction was greatly supported by donations from abroad, the most notable of which was $2 million (about $36 million in 2023) from John D. Rockefeller.

I quite realize that in time the Japanese people will themselves accomplish the complete restoration of their cities and institutions which have been destroyed. However, I shall regard it as a great privilege to be permitted to hasten the day when your University, which stands among the foremost institutions of learning in the world, will again be provided with adequate facilities.

— John D. Rockefeller, From the plaque attached to the building upon the completion of construction

This building completed in 1928 is still in use, and it also serves as the headquarters for the whole of the UTokyo Library System.

A major renovation was completed in the late 2010s, and it now features a 46-metre-deep automatic underground storage capable of housing 3 million books.

The General Library is open to faculty members, students, auditors, members of staff, and others who have been approved by the director. Former faculty members, members of staff, and alumni are also allowed access.

ILL service provides access to the holding of the General Library through interlibrary loan of original material. Loan service is available to university libraries in Japan.

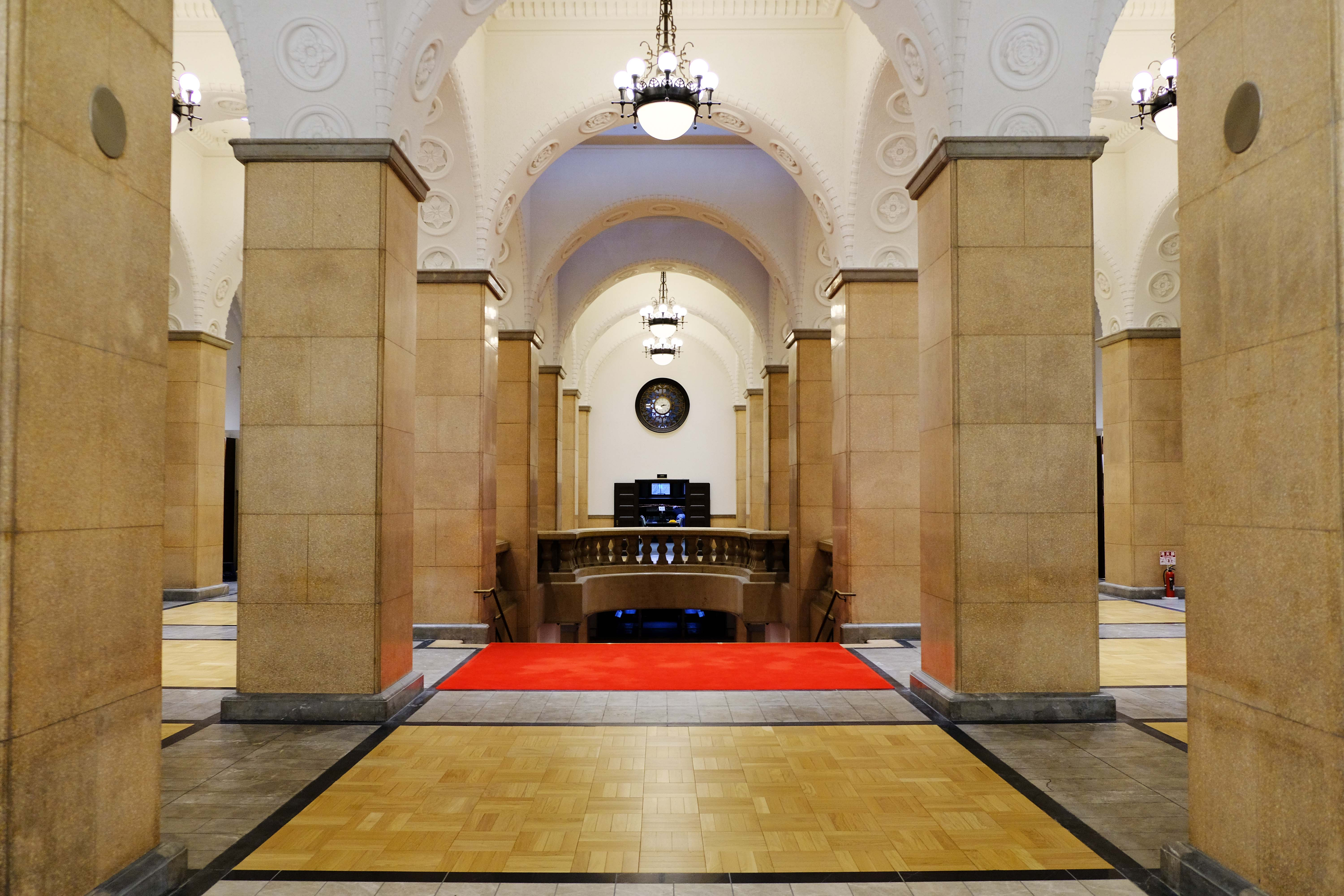
Interior of the General Library

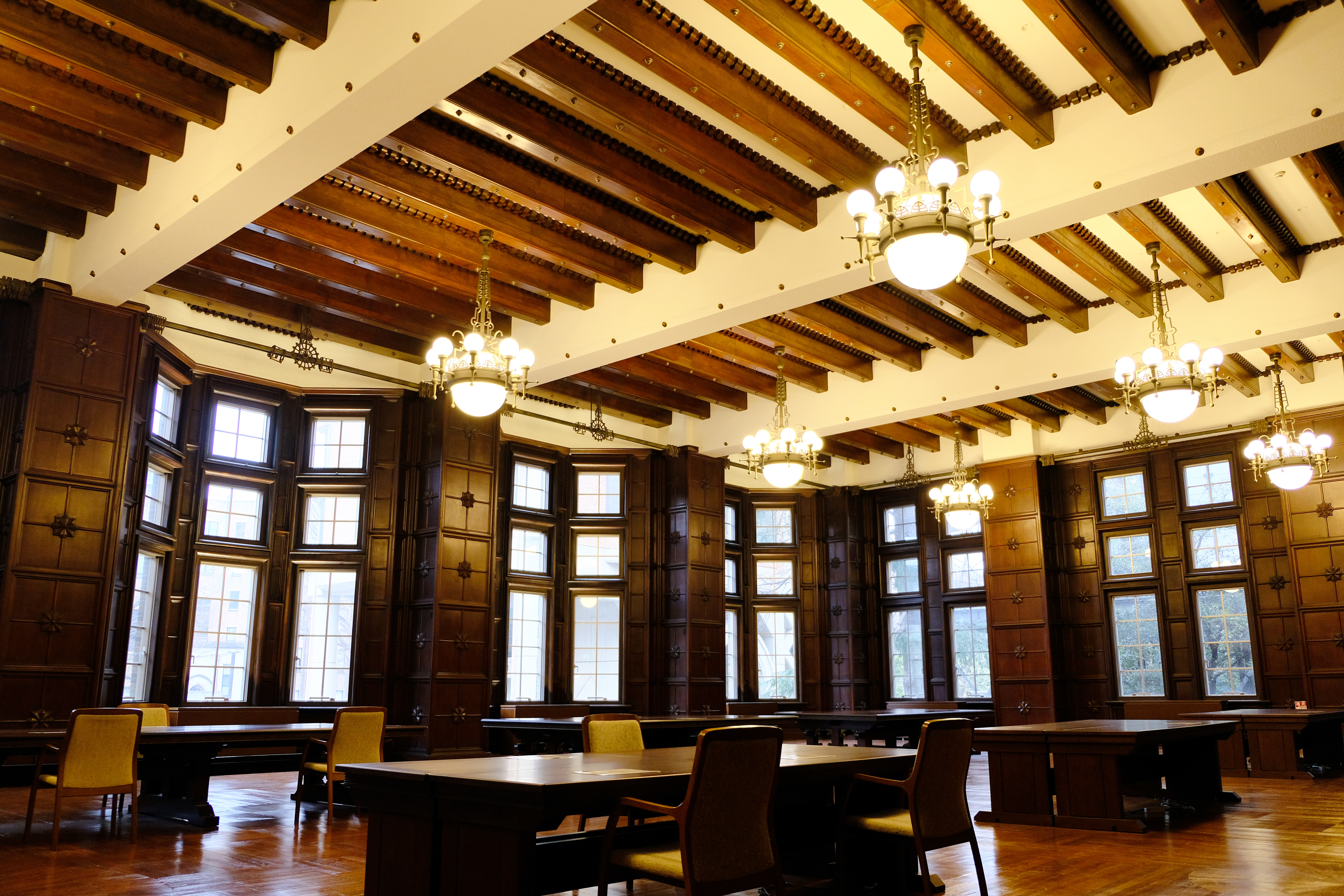
One of the reading rooms

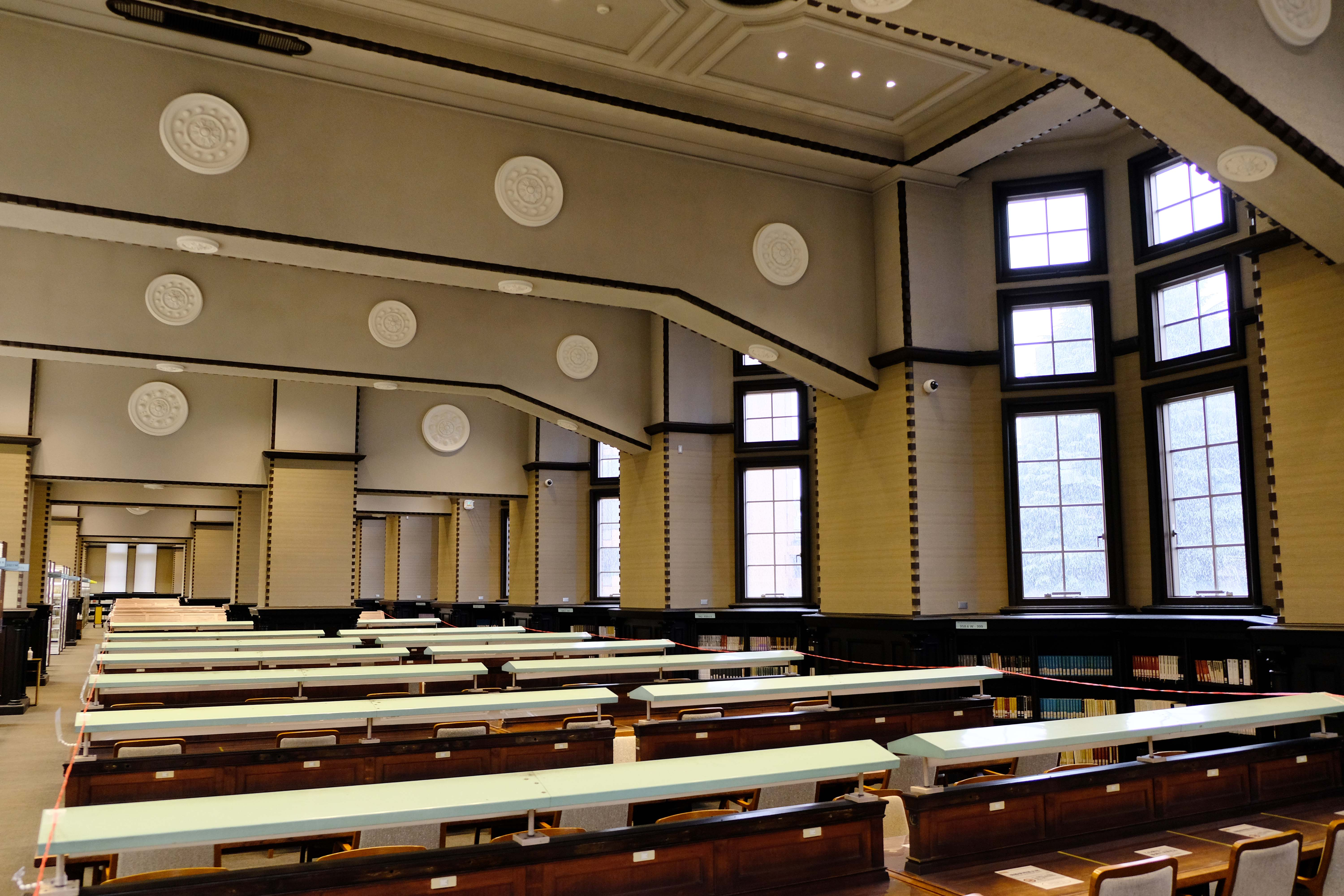
another reading room

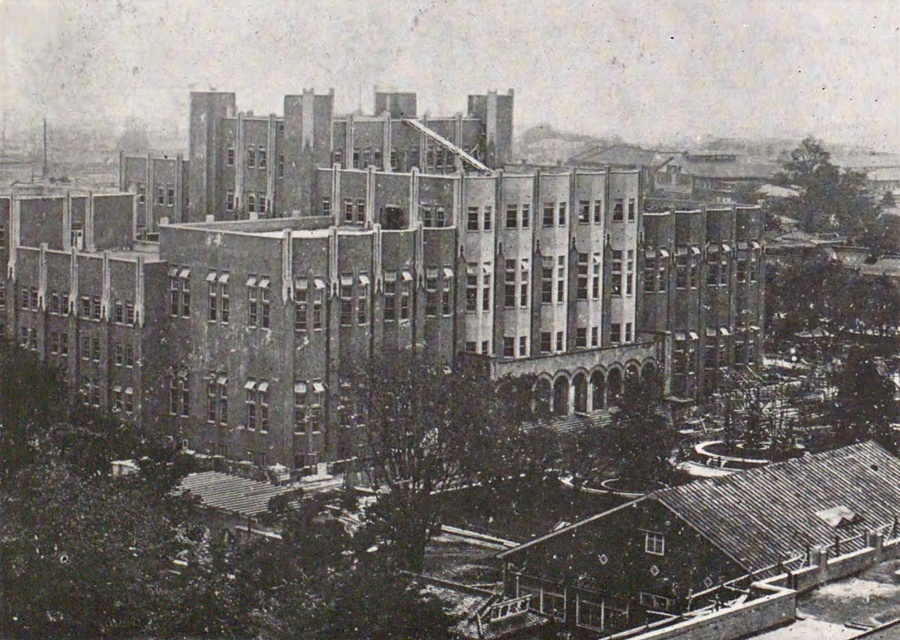
General Library in 1931

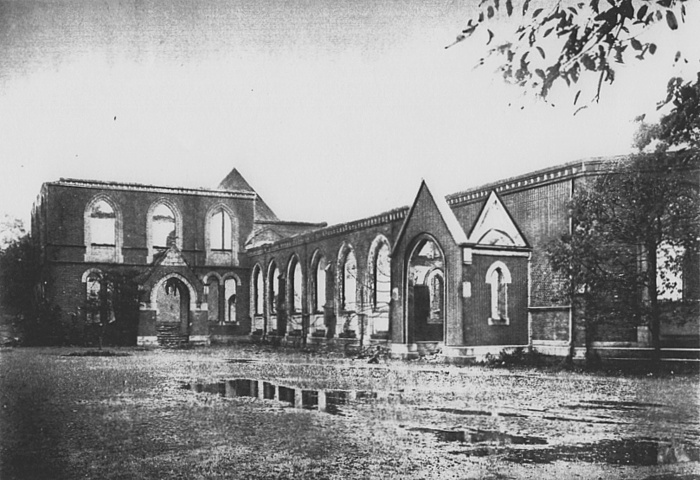
General Library after the Great Earthquake in 1923

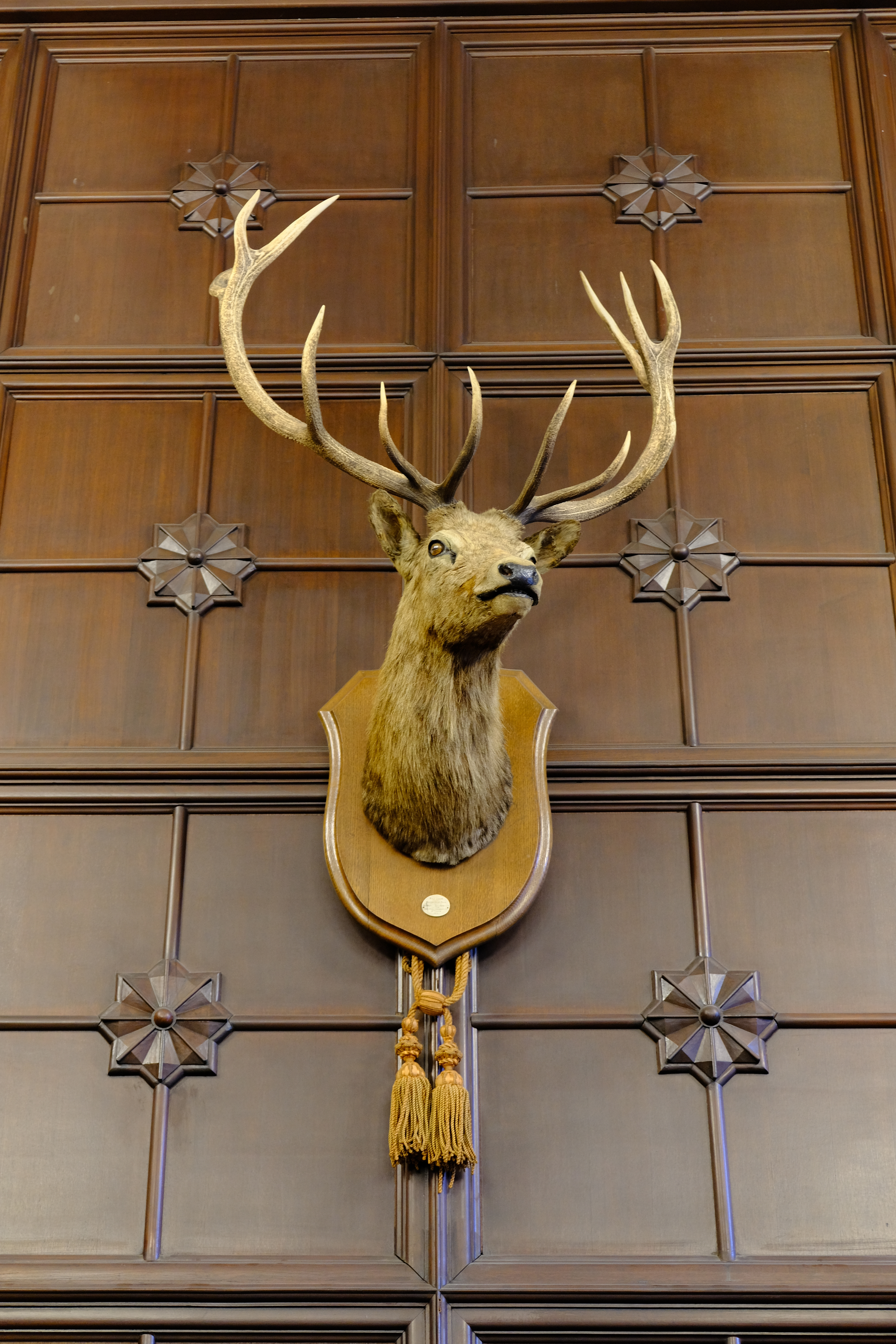
A deer head, a gift from King George V in 1911

=== Komaba Library ===
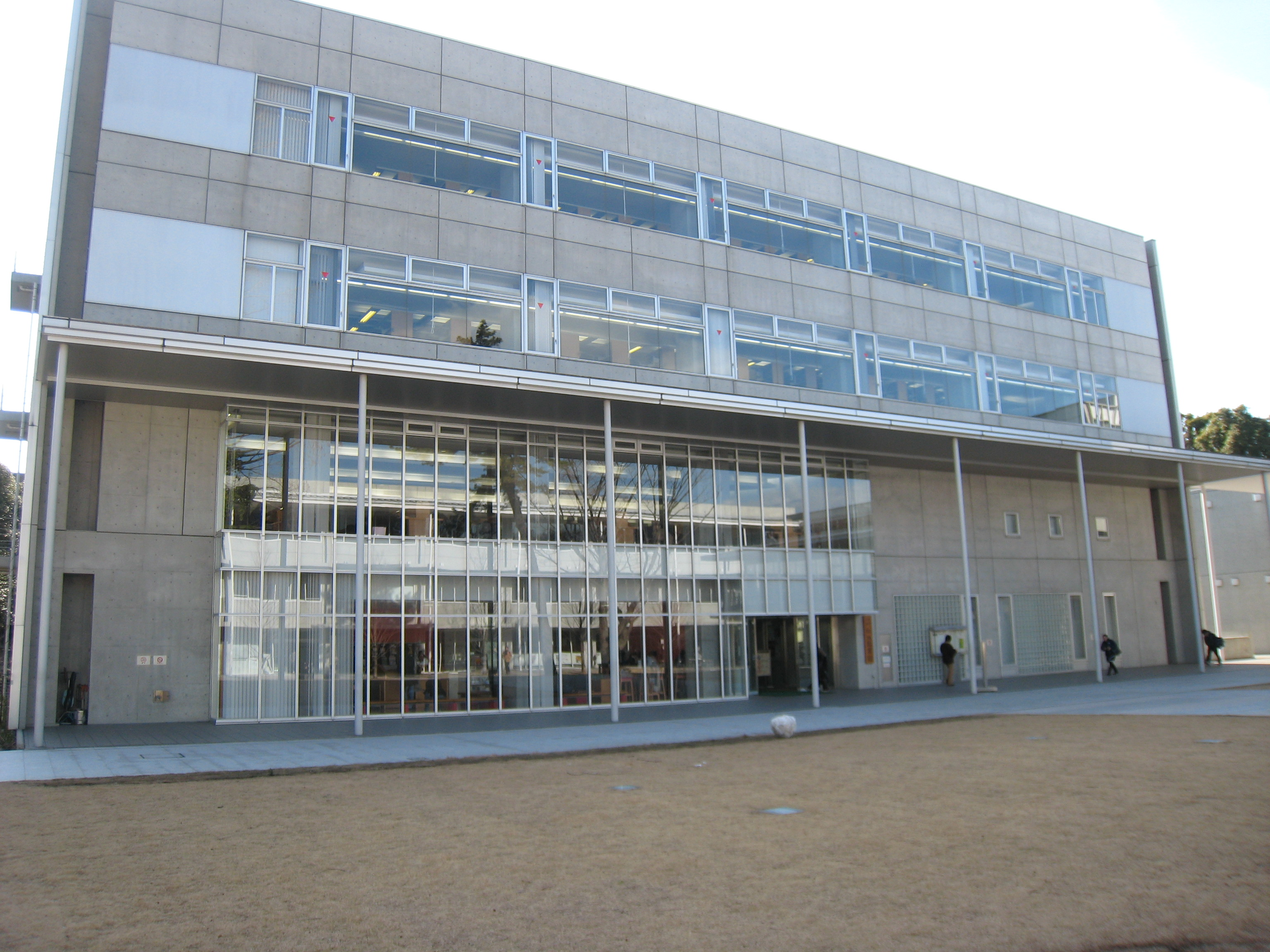
Komaba Library

The current Komaba Library, opened in 2002, serves as the successor to the former building, which had become too small for its growing collections. It functions as the main library for the College of Arts and Sciences at Komaba, catering to the general education of all first-year undergraduate students, as well as second to fourth-year students who decided to study there instead of moving to Hongo for specialised education.

The library features a diverse range of learning materials, particularly for subjects such as Linear Algebra and Calculus, which are mandatory for all natural science undergraduates in their first year.

=== Kashiwa Library ===
Opened in 2004, Kashiwa Library is a library devoted to the natural sciences. All the books in Kashiwa Library can be searched on OPAC.

Faculty members, graduate students, undergraduate students, auditors, others who have requested use from outside the university, and others who have been approved by the director can use the Kashiwa Library.

== Field-Specific Libraries ==
Apart from the three comprehensive libraries, the UTokyo Library System includes 27 field-specific libraries.

=== Hongo ===
Name		Website
Asian Research Library		Link
Law Library		Link
Centre for Modern Legal and Political Documents (Meiji Shinbun Zasshi Bunko)	A comprehensive collection of newspapers, magazines, and other materials that help understand Japan in Meiji and Taisho era	Link
Medical Library		Link
Libraries for Engineering and Information Science & Technology	consists of 10 smaller collections affiliated with each department in the faculty of engineering	Link
Humanities and Sociology Library		Link
Science Library		Link
Economics Library		Link
Education Library		Link
Pharmaceutical Library		Link
Information Studies Library		Link
Multi-media and Socio-information Archive		Link
Institute for Advanced Studies on Asia Library		Link
Institute of Social Science Library		Link
Historiographical Library		Link
University Museum Library		Link

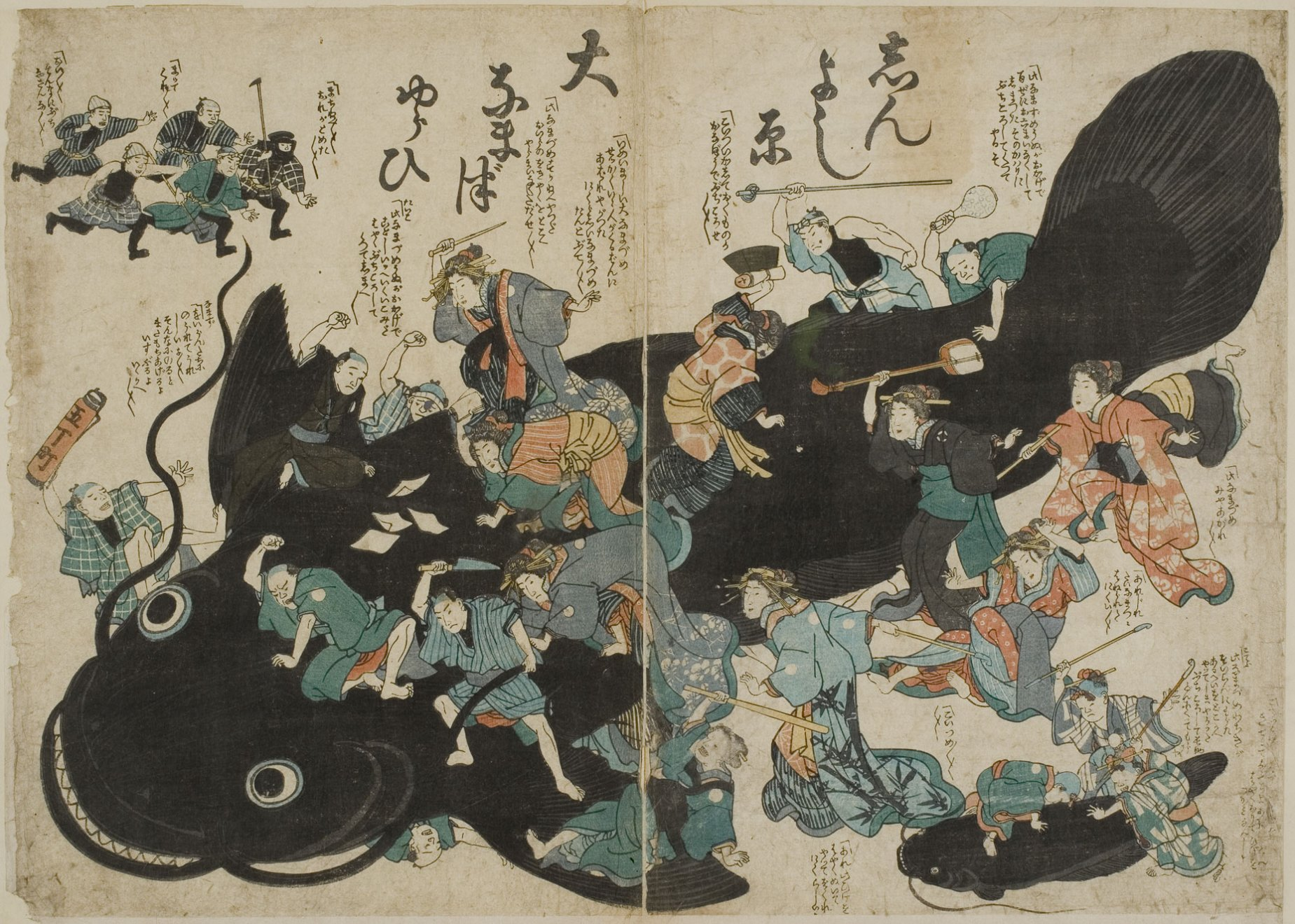
A satirical Ukiyoe printed after the earthquake of 1855. Prostitutes are attacking a huge catfish that caused the earthquake, while the catfish is ready to cause aftershock.

=== Yayoi ===
Name		Website
Agriculture and Life Sciences Library		Link
Earthquake Research Institute Library	Collects not only materials related to modern earthquake and seismic studies but also old Ukiyoe and documents that give detailed information about earthquakes that occurred long before scientific analysis of earthquake started	Link

=== Komaba ===
Name	Website
Science Library, the Graduate School of Arts and Science	Link
Centre for Pacific and American Studies Library	Link
Mathematics Library	Link
Institute of Industrial Science Library	Link
Research Centre for Advanced Science and Technology Library	Link

=== Kashiwa ===
Name	Website
Institute for Cosmic Ray Research Library	Link
Institute for Solid State Physics Library	Link
Atmosphere and Ocean Research Institute Library	Link

== Major Collections ==
The UTokyo Library houses many collections. Some collections are searchable through OPAC, though most are available only through card catalogue.

- Akiba Collection: Collector: Akiba, Yoshimi (1896–1952). Content: Shibai Banzuke (list of the title and the casts of the Kabuki presented on the stage) during the Empo-Meiji eras. 16,831 volumes.
- Katei Collection: Collector: Watanabe, Katei (1864–1926) Content: Japanese fictions in the Edo period. 1,851 volumes.
- Nanki Collection: Collector: Tokugawa, Yorimichi (1872–1925) Content: Collection of Tokugawa, the feudal lord of Kii Province (including Yoshunro-bon, Sakata-bon, Gakkai-bon). 96,000 volumes.
- Ogai Collection: Collector: Mori, Ogai (1862–1922). Content: Biographical or historical books, Bukan (directory of Daimyo and Hatamoto), old maps in the Edo period, European literature. 18,700 volumes.
- Seishu Collection: Collector: Watanabe, Makoto (1840–1911). Content: Chinese classics and Japanese literature. 25,000 volumes.
- Material of the Society of National Policy: Collector: Minobe, Yoji (1900–1953). Content: Literature on politics and economic policy during the World War II. 6,624 volumes.

== ILL Service for Non-University Members ==
Inter-library loan & delivery service between libraries in the campuses is available for researchers as teachers and graduates (some libraries are excluded).

== Online Resources ==
=== Online Catalogs ===
- OPAC (Online Public Access Catalog) / Multilingual OPAC
- Book Contents Database

The Book Contents Database allows you to search for books held in the libraries of the University of Tokyo by looking at their tables of contents or information taken from their summaries and dust jackets. This gives you access to the actual content of the books, which was previously unavailable through the conventional OPAC system. Approximately 229,820 volumes (Japanese:164,319 English:65,501, as of 2004.11) of books/materials held by the University of Tokyo can be searched.

- Doctoral Dissertation Database

The database of bibliographies and abstracts of dissertations/theses, which were granted by the University of Tokyo. The database includes bibliographies from 1957, and abstracts after 1994. Guide to the locations of dissertations is also displayed.

- Database of newspapers available at the University of Tokyo

Search for newspapers held in the University of Tokyo libraries.

=== Faculty/Institution Library's Online Catalogs ===
==== General library ====
- List of Microforms held at the General Library
- Database of the Tibetan Tripitaka Card Catalog
- Catalog of Classical Chinese Books (approx. 10,000 records)
- Institute of Oriental Culture
- Catalogue of Classical Chinese Books in the IOC (before 2001)
- The Digital library of Classical Chinese Books
- Historiographical Institute
- - Historiographical Institute Historical Documents Catalog (historical documents other than books)
