= Hongō, Tokyo =

Neighborhood in Bunkyō-ku, Tokyo

Coordinates: 35.706728°N 139.759891°E

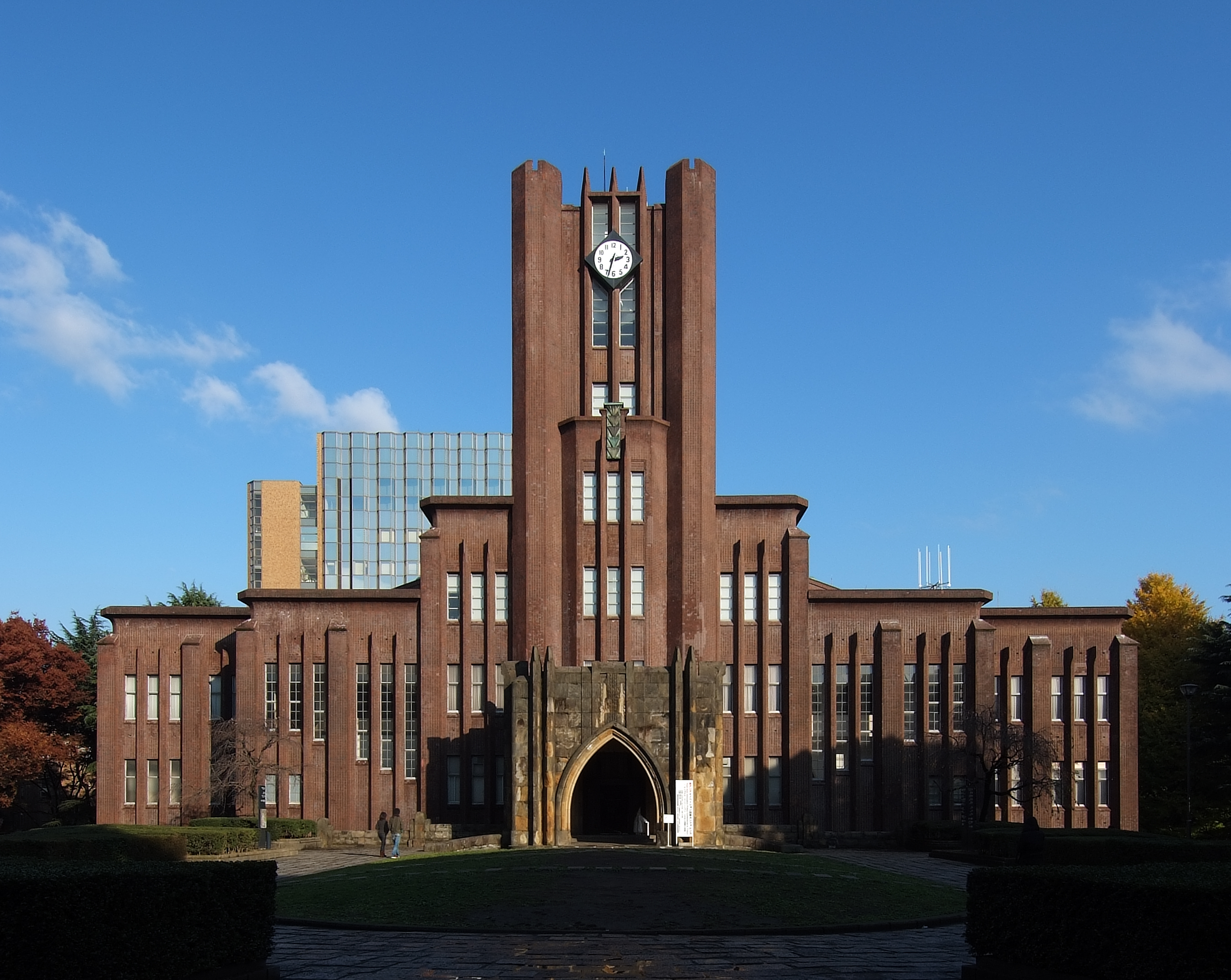
Yasuda Auditorium, University of Tokyo

Hongō (本郷) is a district of Tokyo located in Bunkyō, due north of the Tokyo Imperial Palace and west of Ueno.

== History ==
Hongō was a ward of the former city of Tokyo until 1947, when it merged with another ward, Koishikawa, to form the modern Bunkyō.

== Transportation ==
Hongō-sanchōme Station (Marunouchi Line and Toei Oedo Line) is in the center of this district. It is the main station of this district.

== Education ==
Hongō is home to the University of Tokyo, Juntendo University and Toyo Gakuen University.

Bunkyo Board of Education operates the local public elementary and middle schools.

Zoned elementary schools for parts of Hongo are:

- Hongo (本郷小学校) for 1-2 and 4-5-chome
- Yushima (湯島小学校) for 3 and 7-chome
- Seishi (誠之小学校) for 6-chome

Zoned junior high schools for parts of Hongo include:

- Hongo (本郷台中学校) for 1-5 and 7-chome
- No. 6 (第六中学校) for 6-chome

== Notable people ==
- Yaoya Oshichi – greengrocer's daughter who was burned at the stake for arson in 1683.
