= Niko =

Niko may refer to:

== People ==
The given name is sometimes a short form of Nikola, Nikolas, Nikolaos or others.

- Nikō (1253–1314), Japanese Buddhist disciple of Nichiren
- Niko (musician), American musician active from 2002
- NiKo (born 1997), Bosnian professional esports player
- Niko Anttola (born 2003), Finnish cross-country skier
- Niko B (born 2000), English rapper
- Niko Bartulović (1890–1945), ORJUNA founder
- Niko Barun, Croatian cartoonist and illustrator
- Niko Beerenwinkel, German mathematician
- Niko Bellotto, Spanish musician
- Niko Bespalla (1938–2017), Albanian footballer
- Niko Bessinger (1948–2008), Namibian politician
- Niko Bianconi (born 1991), Italian footballer
- Niko Bolas, American music producer
- Niko Bretschneider (born 1999), German footballer
- Niko Bundalo, American basketball player
- Niko Bungert (born 1986), German footballer
- Niko Čeko (born 1969), Croatian footballer
- Niko Datković (born 1993), Croatian footballer
- Niko Davin (born 1997), Namibian cricketer
- Niko Decolati (born 1997), American baseball player
- Niko Dimitrakos (born 1979), Greek-American ice hockey player
- Niko Dobros (born 1993), German-Greek player
- Niko Dovana, Albanian footballer
- Niko Eeckhout (born 1970), Belgian cyclist
- Niko Etxart (born 1953), Basque singer and musician
- Niko Galešić (born 2001), Croatian footballer
- Niko Geldner, German-Swiss biologist
- Niko Giantsopoulos (born 1994), Canadian soccer player
- Niko Gießelmann (born 1991), German footballer
- Niko Gjyzari (born 1934), Albanian economist and politician
- Niko von Glasow (born 1960), German film director and producer
- Niko Goodrum (born 1992), American baseball player
- Niko Gotsiridze (1871–1949), Georgian actor
- Niko Grafenauer (born 1940), Slovenian poet, essayist, literary historian, editor and translator
- Niko Gršković (1863–1949), Croatian politician and journalist
- Niko Grünfeld (born 1975), Danish politician
- Niko Guido (born 1966), Turkish photographer
- Niko Haapakoski (born 1996), Finnish volleyball player
- Niko Hämäläinen (born 1997), Finnish footballer
- Niko Hansen (born 1994), Danish-American professional soccer player
- Niko Havelka (born 1999), Croatian footballer
- Niko Heiskanen (born 1989), Finnish footballer
- Niko Henrichon, Canadian comic book writer/artist
- Niko Hovinen (born 1988), Finnish ice hockey player
- Niko Hurme (born 1974), Finnish bass player
- Niko Huuhtanen (born 2003), Finnish ice hockey player
- Niko Ikävalko (born 1988), Finnish footballer
- Niko Is (born 1988), American rapper
- Niko Janković (born 2001), Croatian footballer
- Niko Jones (born 2000), New Zealand rugby union player
- Niko Kallela (born 1991), Finnish ice hockey player
- Niko Kapanen (born 1978), Finnish ice hockey player
- Niko Kappel (born 1995), German Paralympic athlete
- Niko Karhu (born 1993), Finnish ice hockey player
- Niko Kari (born 1999), Finnish racing driver
- Niko Kata (born 1993), Equatoguinean footballer
- Niko Kavadas (born 1998), American baseball player
- Niko Kijewski (born 1996), German footballer
- Niko Kirwan (born 1995), New Zealand footballer
- Niko Koffeman (born 1958), Dutch politician
- Niko Koutouvides (born 1981), American football player
- Niko Kovač (born 1971), Croatian soccer player and manager
- Niko Kranjčar (born 1984), Croatian soccer player
- Niko Kukka (born 1987), Finnish footballer
- Niko Laakkonen (born 1988), Finnish ice hockey winger
- Niko Lalos (born 1997), American football player
- Niko Lekishvili (1947–2025), Georgian politician
- Niko Lomouri (1852–1912), Georgian writer and educator
- Niko Markkula (born 1990), Finnish footballer
- Niko Medved (born 1973), American college basketball coach
- Niko Mikkola (born 1996), Finnish ice hockey player
- Niko Miljanić (1892–1957), Montenegrin and Serbian anatomist and surgeon
- Niko Mindegía (born 1988), Spanish handball player
- Niko Moon (born 1982), American singer and songwriter
- Niko Myroniuk (born 2005), Canadian soccer player
- Niko Nawaikula (born 1960), Fijian politician
- Niko Nestor (1934–2016), Macedonian open water swimmer and water polo player
- Niko Nicotera, German-born American actor
- Niko Nieminen (born 1982), Finnish ice hockey player
- Niko Nikoladze (1843–1928), Georgian writer
- Niko Nirvi (born 1961), Finnish journalist
- Niko Noga (born 1962), American football player
- Niko Ojamäki (born 1995), Finnish ice hockey player
- Niko Omilana (born 1998), British YouTuber, prankster, internet troll and perennial political candidate
- Niko Opper (born 1992), German footballer
- Niko Ott (born 1945), West German rower
- Niko Paech (born 1960), German economist
- Niko Palhares (born 1966), Brazilian former racing driver
- Niko Palonen (born 1989), Finnish ice hockey player
- Niko Peleshi (born 1970), Albanian politician
- Niko Peltola (born 1990), Finnish ice hockey player
- Niko Peraić (born 1988), Croatian footballer
- Niko Piiparinen (born 1989), Finnish ice hockey player
- Niko Pirosmani (1862–1918), Georgian painter
- Niko Price (born 1989), American mixed martial arts fighter
- Niko Qafzezi (1914–1998), Albanian pedagogue
- Niko Qoro (born 1969), Fijian former rugby union international
- Niko Rak (born 2003), Croatian footballer
- Niko Saler (born 1992), Canadian soccer player
- Niko Schneebauer (born 1998), Austrian footballer
- Niko Semlitsch (born 1946), German footballer
- Niko Sigur (born 2003), Canadian soccer player
- Niko Snellman (born 1988), Finnish ice hockey player
- Niko Snoj (born 1990), Slovenian footballer
- Niko Springer (born 2000), German darts player
- Niko Takahashi (born 2005), Japanese footballer
- Niko Terho (born 1996), Barbadian-Finnish actor
- Niko Testen (born 1997), Slovenian slalom canoeist
- Niko Tokić (born 1988), Croatian footballer
- Niko Tsakiris (born 2005), American professional soccer player
- Niko Tskhvedadze (1845–1911), Georgian educator
- Niko Tsonev, Bulgarian musician
- Niko Tsurusaki (born 2004), Japanese idol
- Niko Tuhkanen (born 1988), Finnish ice hockey player
- Niko Unavalu (born 1991), Vanuatuan cricketer
- Niko Vakararawa, Fijian rugby league footballer
- Niko Valkeapää (born 1968), Finnish Sami musician
- Niko Vance (born 1999), American professional wrestler
- Niko de Vera (born 1996), American Filipino professional soccer player
- Niko Verekauta (born 1987), Fijian sprinter
- Niko Walters, New Zealand musical artist
- Niko Warbanoff, German industrial engineer
- Niko Xhaçka (born 1944), Albanian footballer
- Niko Zisi (born 1995), Albanian footballer
- Niko Županič (1876–1961), Slovenian ethnologist and politician
- Maurizio De Jorio (born 1967), Italian Eurobeat artist using the stage name Niko

=== Fictional characters ===
- Niko Bellic, the main character of the game Grand Theft Auto IV
- Niklaren Goldeye (nickname Niko), a character in Tamora Pierce's Emelan books
- Niko Leandros, in the Cal Leandros book series by Rob Thurman
- Dr. Niko "Nick" Tatopoulos, the main character in the 1998 film Godzilla
- Niko, in the 1994 film The Mask
- Niko, the main character in the 2008 animated Christmas film The Flight Before Christmas
- Niko, the main character from the video game OneShot
- Niko, one of two playable protagonists from the video game Nikoderiko: The Magical World

== Other uses ==
- Nikō (company), former name of Japanese camera-maker Cosina
- Niko Resources, Canadian oil and gas company
- Niko, a common abbreviation of Mykolaiv (Ukrainian), also called Nikolaev or Nikolayev (Russian), a city in southern Ukraine

== See also ==
- Niko & the Way to the Stars, a 2008 animated film in Finnish
- Nikko (disambiguation)
- Nikos, a given name (including a list of people with the name)
- Nico (disambiguation)
- Neko (disambiguation)
