= Graduate School of Science and Faculty of Science, University of Tokyo =

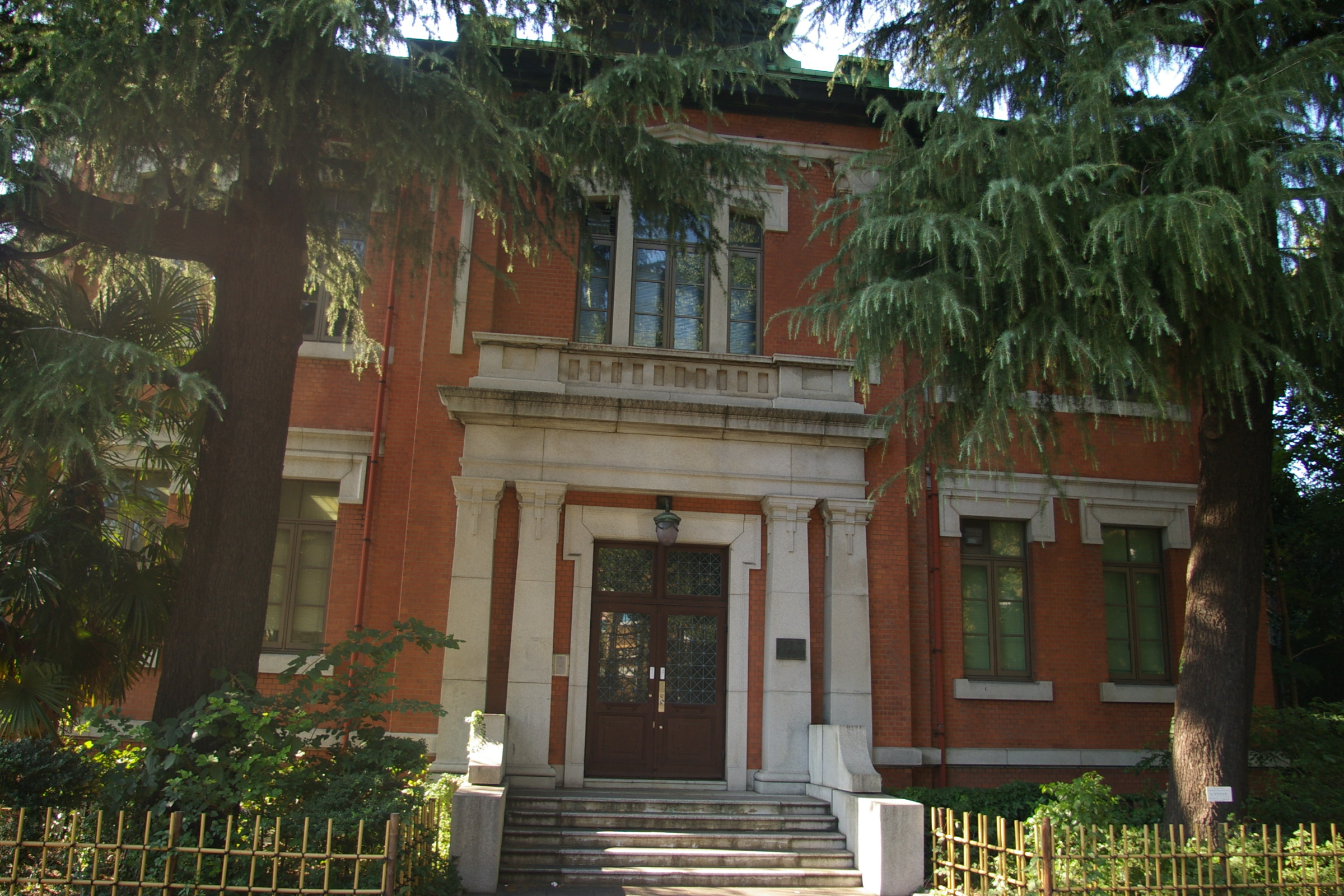
Chem. East Bldg.

Faculty of Science (東京大学理学部) is one of the 10 constituent faculties, and Graduate School of Science (東京大学大学院理学系研究科) is one of the constituent 15 graduate schools at University of Tokyo. The faculty and the graduate school operate as one with the exception of mathematics and computer science. Founded in 1877, Faculty of Science is one of the oldest 4 faculties (Science, Medicine, Law and Letters) of the University of Tokyo.

Faculty of Science and Graduate School of Science have produced 6 Nobel laureates (Esaki, Koshiba, Nanbu, Kajita, Osumi, Manabe) and one Fields Medallist (Kodaira).

== Organization ==
=== Faculty of Science (Undergraduate Departments) ===
- Departments:
  - Mathematics (UG) - affiliated with Graduate School of Mathematical Sciences
  - Information Science (UG) - affiliated with Graduate School of Information Science and Technology
  - Physics (UG)
  - Astronomy (UG)
  - Earth and Planetary Physics (UG)
  - Earth and Planetary Environmental Science (UG)
  - Chemistry (UG)
  - Biophysics and Biochemistry (UG)
  - Biological Sciences (UG)
    - Zoology course
    - Botany course
    - Anthropology course
  - Bioinformatics and Systems Biology (UG)

=== Graduate School of Science (Graduate Departments) ===
- Departments:
  - Physics (GR)
  - Astronomy (GR)
  - Earth and Planetary Science (GR)
  - Chemistry (GR)
  - Biological Sciences (GR)

=== Affiliated facilities ===
- Koishikawa Botanical Garden
- Nikko Botanical Garden
- The Misaki Marine Biological Station (MMBS)
- Research Centre for Spectrochemistry (RCS)
- Geochemical Research Center (GRC)
- Institute of Astronomy (IoA)
- Kiso Observatory
- Center for Nuclear Study (CNS)
- Research Center for the Early Universe (RESCEU)
- Center for Attosecond Laser Science
- Molecular Genetics Research Laboratory (MGRL)
- Institute for Photon Science and Technology
- Universal Biology Institute (UBI)
- UTokyo Organization for Planetary and Space Science
- Institute for Physics of Intelligence

== See also ==
- Graduate School of Information Science and Technology, University of Tokyo
