= School of Engineering, University of Tokyo =

- 東京大学 工学系研究科・工学部
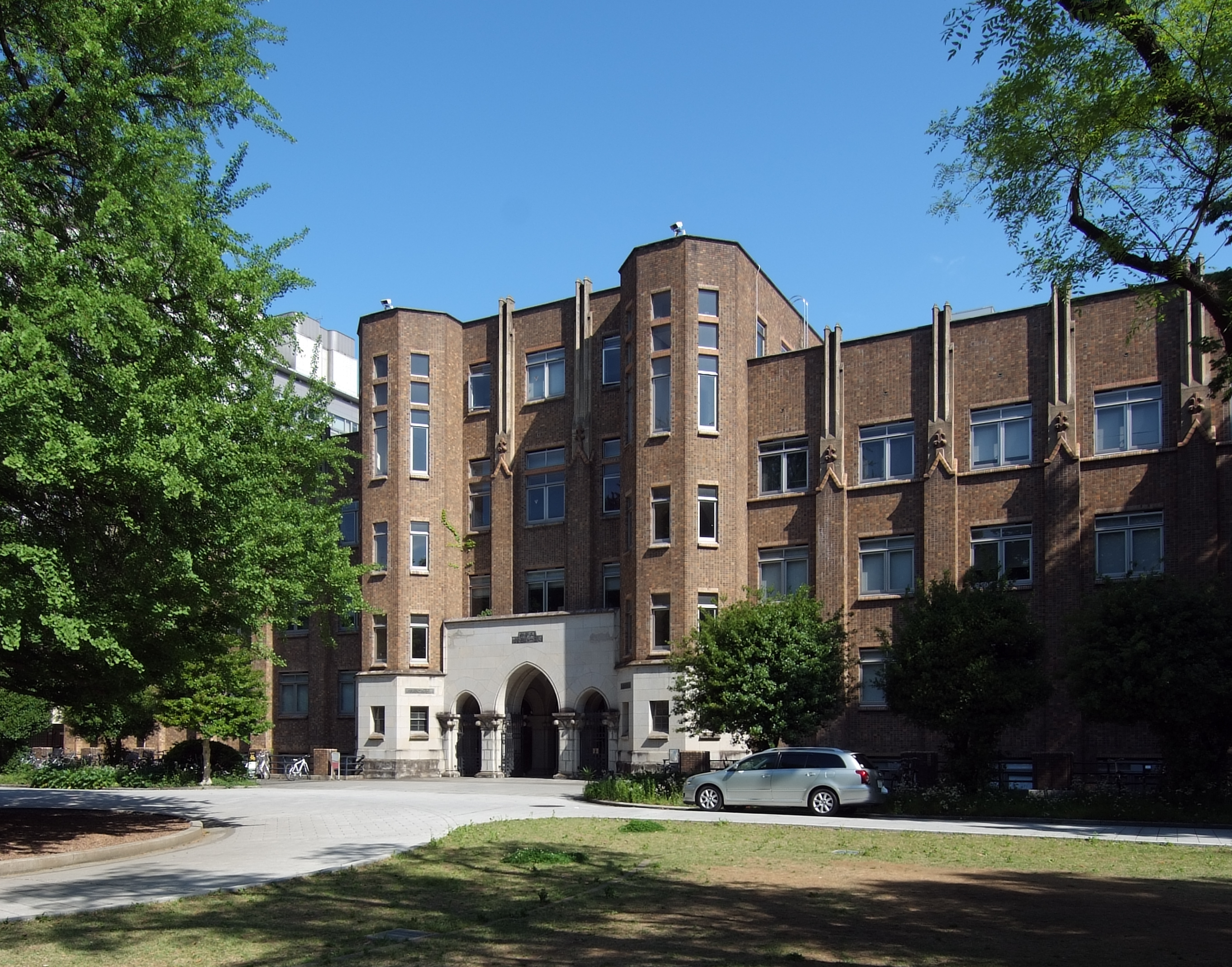
- Building One, School of Engineering
- Established: 1873 (as the Imperial College of Engineering); March 1886 (as the College of Engineering)
- Location: Bunkyō, Tokyo, Japan
- Campus: urban
- Website: t.u-tokyo.ac.jp

The School of Engineering at the University of Tokyo comprises the Faculty of Engineering and the Graduate School of Engineering. The former oversees undergraduate education, while the latter is responsible for postgraduate studies. In practice, they share faculty, facilities, and other research and educational resources, and operate as a single entity.

The School of Engineering traces its origins back to the Imperial College of Engineering, which was founded in 1873 to train engineers by recruiting a large number of British scholars and engineers as its faculty. At the time, Japan had just ended its two-century-long self-imposed seclusion, while Western Europe was in the midst of the Industrial Revolution. Thus, there was an urgent need to import advanced engineering knowledge. In March 1886, the college merged with the Department of Industrial Arts of the School of Science at the University of Tokyo, forming the College of Engineering. The School has been considered the pioneer of modern engineering education and research in Japan.

== Organisation ==
=== Faculty of Engineering (undergraduate) ===
The Faculty of Engineering has 16 departments.

==== Department of Civil Engineering ====
- Design and Technology Strategy Course (Social Infrastructure A)
- Policy and Planning Course (Social Infrastructure B)
- International Project Course (Social Infrastructure C)

==== Department of Architecture ====
The Department of Architecture traces its origins to the Imperial College of Engineering's the Department of Zoka (House building). In 1877, the British architect Josiah Conder was invited to teach, which established a formal architecture curriculum. After the 1893 introduction of the chair (course) system, three chairs were set up:

- General Architectural Structures
- Architectural Design
- Historical Ornament and Architectural History

In 1898, the name changed from Zoka to the Department of Kenchiku (Architecture), as it is known today. A chair covering steel and concrete structures was introduced in 1915, followed in 1920 by a chair for the history of East Asian architecture. After the Second World War, a new welding course was introduced, and a chair in architectural materials emerged, making a total of eight chairs. When the Department of Urban Engineering was launched in 1962, several urban planning chairs moved to that new department. In 1968, architectural materials became an official chair, followed by additional chairs in architectural planning in 1970. Today, the department consists of four main divisions (or 'major chairs'): Architectural Engineering, Architectural Planning, Architectural Structures, and Architectural Environmental Engineering.

==== Department of Urban Engineering ====
- Urban Environmental Engineering Course
- Urban Planning Course

The Department of Urban Engineering was founded in 1962 by merging five chairs of urban planning (four from Architecture and one from Civil Engineering) and three chairs of sanitary engineering (from Civil Engineering).

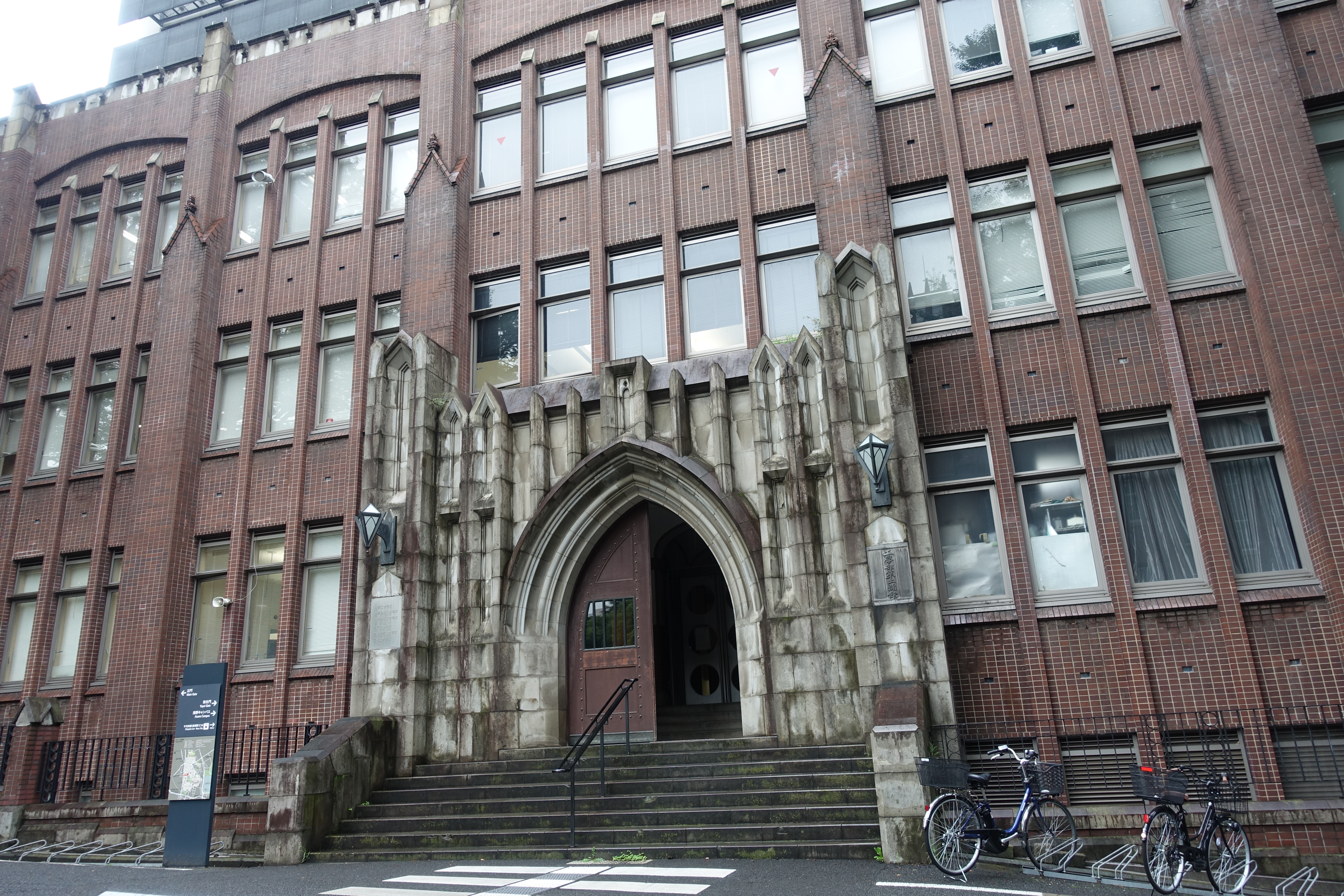
Building Two, which houses the Mechanical Group and the Electronics and Information Group

==== Department of Mechanical Engineering (Mechanical A) and Department of Mechano-Informatics (Mechanical B) ====
The Department of Mechanical Engineering was established in 1886, at the same time as the founding of the College of Engineering. In 1960, the Department of Industrial Mechanical Engineering was formed, followed in 1961 by the Department of Naval Architectural Engineering. The latter was reorganised in 1991 as the Department of Mechano-Informatics. In 2009, the Department of Industrial Mechanical Engineering was discontinued, resulting in the current two-department system often referred to as 'the Mechanical Group':

- Mechanical A (Design, Industrial, and Environmental Engineering)
- Mechanical B (Information and Control)

==== Department of Aeronautics and Astronautics ====
- Aerospace Systems Course
- Aerospace Propulsion Course

==== Department of Precision Engineering ====
The Department of Precision Engineering originated in 1887 as the Department of Ordnance (Zōhei). It was renamed the Department of Precision Machining in 1946 and the Department of Precision Engineering in 1947. In 1963, the name changed again to the Department of Precision Mechanical Engineering. It was discontinued in 2000 when it merged with other departments to form the Department of Systems Innovation, then reinstated in 2006 under its current name. Similar to the Department of Systems Innovation, it features project-based modules in its curriculum.

==== Department of Electrical and Electronic Engineering (Electronics and Information B) ====
These two departments are collectively referred to as the 'Electronics and Information Group'. When the College of Engineering was founded in 1886, the Department of Electrical Engineering was also formed. The Department of Electronic Engineering was added in 1958. In April 2008, with the reorganisation of relevant graduate schools, these two undergraduate programmes were merged into the Department of Electrical and Electronic Engineering. The Department of Electronic and Information Engineering was then created in 1991 as a separate entity.

==== Department of Mathematical Engineering and Information Physics ====
- Mathematical Informatics Course
- Systems Information Engineering Course

These two departments are often referred to together as the Applied Physics Division.

==== Department of Materials Engineering ====
- Biomaterials Course (Materials Engineering A)
- Environmental and Fundamental Materials Course (Materials Engineering B)
- Information and Nano-Materials Course (Materials Engineering C)

==== Department of Chemistry and Biotechnology ====
These three departments are jointly described as the 'three Chemistry and Life Science Departments'. Students are allocated to each department separately, though some lectures and experiments are conducted jointly.

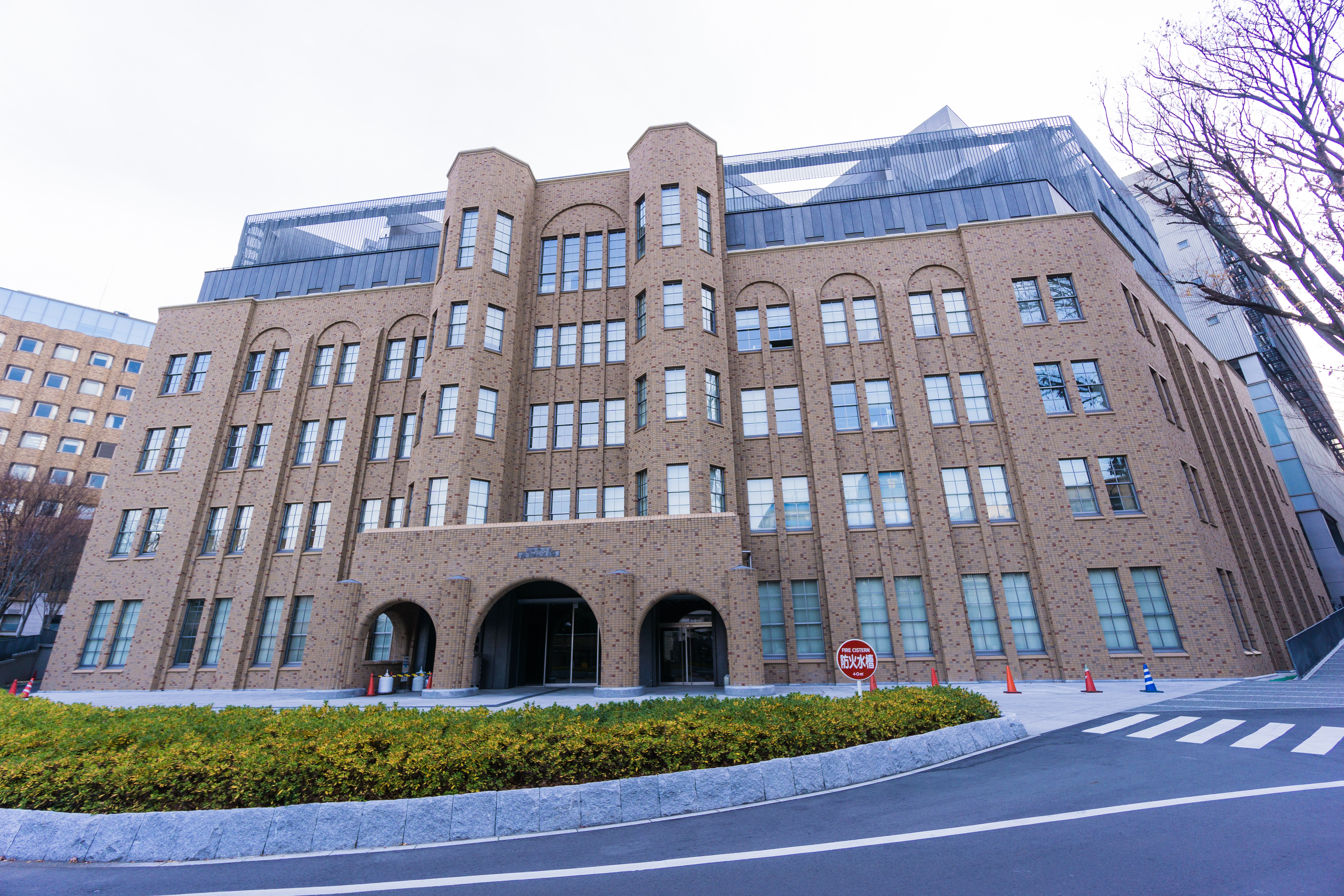
Building Three, which houses the Department of Systems Innovation

==== Department of Systems Innovation ====
- Environment and Energy Systems (E&E) Course (Systems Innovation A)
- Systems Design & Management (SDM) Course (Systems Innovation B)
- Perspective, Science-based design and Accountable Implementation (PSI) Course (Systems Innovation C)

The Department of Systems Innovation was established in 2000 through the merger of four departments: Precision Mechanical Engineering (reinstated in 2006 as Precision Engineering), Shipbuilding and Ocean Engineering (formerly Shipbuilding), Quantum Engineering and Systems Science (formerly Nuclear Engineering), and Geosystem Engineering (formerly Resource Development Engineering, which had evolved from Mining Engineering). Teaching is provided by staff from those former departments, but the department’s curriculum is not a simple merger of the four fields; it takes an integrated approach across engineering.

== Rankings and reputation ==
The school is widely regarded as having the best educational and research standards in the country across most of the fields it covers. According to the THE World University Rankings by Subject 2024, the fields fully or partially covered by the School at the University of Tokyo were ranked as follows:

THE World University Rankings by Subject 2024
| Subject | Global | National | Other faculties within the university responsible for the subject |
|---|---|---|---|
| Engineering | 29 | 1 | |
| Computer science | 33 | 1 | Science, Arts and Sciences |
| Life sciences | 30 | 1 | Science, Agriculture, Medicine, Arts and Sciences, Pharmaceutical Sciences |
| Physical sciences | 24 | 1 | Sicence, Arts and Sciences |

The QS World University Rankings by Subject 2024 provide a more detailed subject breakdown:

QS World University Rankings by Subject 2024
| Subject | Global | National | Other faculties within the university responsible for the subject |
|---|---|---|---|
| Engineering and Technology | 18 | 1 | |
| Engineering – Chemical | 15 | 1 | |
| Engineering – Civil and Structural | 21 | 1 | |
| Computer Science and Information Systems | 38 | 1 | Science, Arts and Sciences |
| Engineering – Electrical and Electronic | 33 | 1 | |
| Engineering – Petroleum | 10 | 1 | |
| Engineering – Mechanical | 21 | 1 | |
| Architecture and Built Environment | 15 | 1 | |
| Materials Sciences | 20 | 1 | Science |
| Earth and Marine Sciences | 11 | 1 | Science, Agriculture |
