= Laamanen =

Laamanen is a Finnish surname. Notable people with the surname include:

- Anu Laamanen (born 1958), Finnish diplomat
- Elmeri Laamanen (born 1994), Finnish professional ice hockey player
- Jukka Laamanen (born 1976), Finnish professional ice hockey player
