= Koishikawa Yojosho =

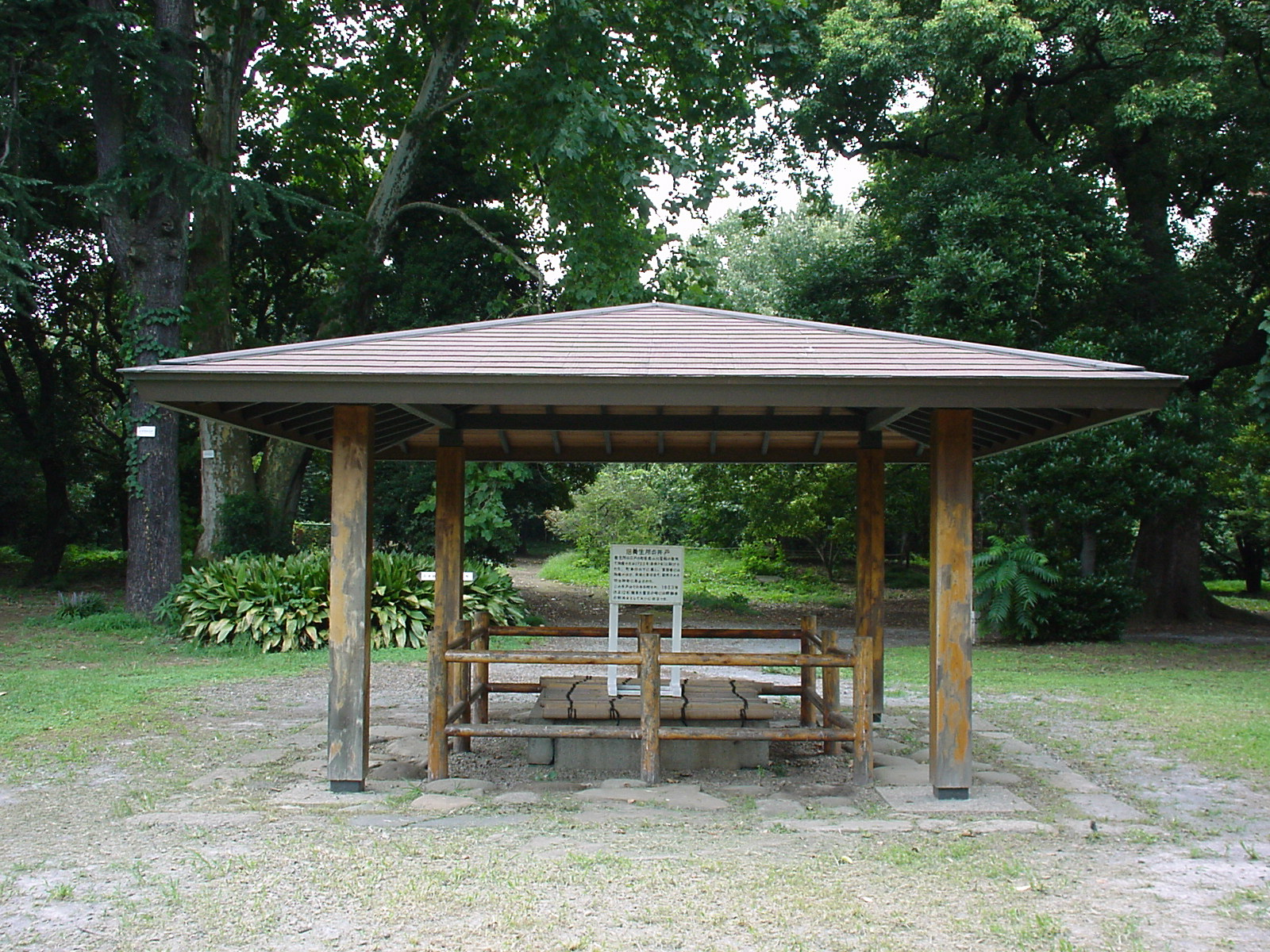
- The old water well of the Koishikawa Yojosho

General information
- Status: Defunct
- Type: Hospital
- Location: Koishikawa, Edo (now Bunkyō, Tokyo)
- Town or city: Tokyo
- Country: Japan
- Coordinates: 35.7198°N 139.7446°E
- Opened: 1722

The Koishikawa Yojosho was a Japanese hospital located in Koishikawa, Edo, in what is now the Bunkyō municipality of the Tokyo Metropolis of modern Japan.

The hospital was established in 1722 by the shōgun Tokugawa Yoshimune in the herb gardens of what is now the Koishikawa Botanical Gardens at the suggestion of the town physician Ogawa Shosen. The hospital offered its services only to the indigent. It was eventually merged into Tokyo University's medical school.
