= Nikko =

Nikko may refer to:

== Places ==
- Nikkō, a city in Kantō, Japan
- Nikko Botanical Garden, at Nikkō, Japan
- Nikkō National Park, Kantō, Japan

== Organizations, products, and services ==
- Nikkō (train), a train service in Japan
- Nikko Cordial, a Japanese brokerage firm
- Nikko Citigroup, a Japanese financial services company
- Nikko R/C, a toy-grade radio control manufacturer
- Nikko Ceramics, a Japanese manufacturer of fine ceramics
- Nikko Hotels, an international hotel chain
- Nikkō (lens designation) (日光), an early brand used by Nikon Corporation

== Fictional characters ==
- Nikko, the leader of the Winged Monkeys in the 1939 film The Wizard of Oz
- Nikko, an old man in L. Frank Baum's 1907 novel and 1914 film The Last Egyptian
- Nikko, a character in the comic-strip Minimum Security
- Nikko Halloran, a character in the 1993 film RoboCop 3 played by Remy Ryan

== Other uses ==
- Nikko (name), including a list of people with the name
- Nikko (bodhisattva) or Suryaprabha, a religious figure

== See also ==
- Niko (disambiguation)
