= Heiskanen =

Heiskanen is a Finnish surname. Notable people with the surname include:

- Juho Heiskanen (1889–1950), Finnish general
- Kaarlo Heiskanen (1894–1962), Finnish general
- Maria Heiskanen (born 1970), Finnish actress
- Miro Heiskanen (born 1999), Finnish ice hockey player
- Niko Heiskanen (born 1989), Finnish footballer
- Outi Heiskanen (1937–2022), Finnish artist
- Santeri Heiskanen (born 1977), Finnish ice hockey player
- Veikko Aleksanteri Heiskanen (1894–1971), Finnish geodesist
