= Ogawa Shosen =

Japanese doctor (1672–1760)

Ogawa Shōsen (小川 笙船; Ōmi, 1672 — Edo, 26 July 1760), known as Ogawa Hiromasa (小川 広正), was a Japanese physician and promoter of the only charity hospital that existed during the Edo period.

Born in the former Ōmi Province, now part of Shiga Prefecture . His given name was "Hiromasa" — but popularly addressed as "Shōsen", and by the nickname "Doctor Redbeard". He devoted himself to Chinese medicine and established his practice in the city of Edo. Concerned about the situation of the most needy, he made a request to the authorities, through the shōgun's suggestion box, to open a charity hospital aimed at widows, nuns, the poor and other people without resources, in the image of the Seyakuin, a medical institution that had existed in the 9th century, which had also recovered in the 13th century. The shogun Tokugawa Yoshimune agreed to the proposal, and facilities constructed inside the Koishikawa medicinal herb garden (now Koishikawa Botanical Garden). The foundation date of this small hospital is marked on 4 December 1722 (10 January 1723 in the Georgian calendar).

The center was named Yōjōsho (sanatorium), with Ogawa appointed superintendent and in charge of the management. He had the collaboration of other doctors and a support staff formed by various men and women. The administration of the hospital was under the supervision of a local magistrate through a commission of accountants and assistants.

Ogawa led a simple and comfortable life as a doctor — caring for the wealthy and dedicated himself to the needy and the common good. His efforts were aimed at caring for the poor, who despite being unable to pay, contributed what they could in the form of products from their crops or with water. Upon his death, the hospital came under the direction of his son Taiji, who had been its caretaker, and later his grandson, Akimichi.

Towards the end of his life he was offered the position of official physician to the shogunate, but declined due to his advanced age. He retired professionally and lived for a time in Kanazawa, although he later returned to Edo, where he died in 1760. His grave is located in Zōshigaya Cemetery.
