= Paavo Tirkkonen =

Finnish ice hockey player

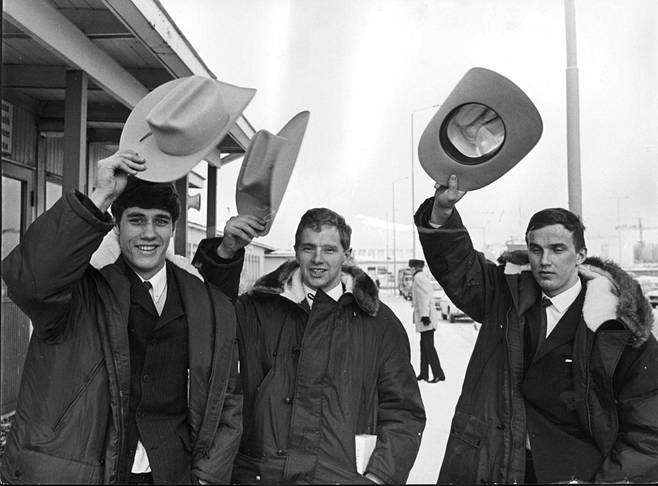
- Photograph of the Finnish ice hockey players Veli-Pekka Ketola, Seppo Laakkio and Paavo Tirkkonen.
- Born: 2 December 1947; Savonlinna, Finland
- Died: 5 August 2012 (aged 64)
- Height: 6 ft 0 in (183 cm)
- Weight: 180 lb (82 kg; 12 st 12 lb)
- Position: Defence
- Played for: SaPKo Savonlinna
- National team: Finland
- Playing career: 1966–1983

Paavo Juhani Tirkkonen (2 December 1947 – 5 August 2012) was a Finnish ice hockey defenceman and Olympian.

Tirkkonen played with Team Finland at the 1968 Winter Olympics held in Grenoble, France. He previously played for SaPKo Savonlinna in SM-Liiga.
