= Graduate Schools for Law and Politics and Faculty of Law, University of Tokyo =

Law school affiliated with the University of Tokyo

Faculty of Law Graduate School for Law and Politics
- 東京大学法学部 法学政治学研究科
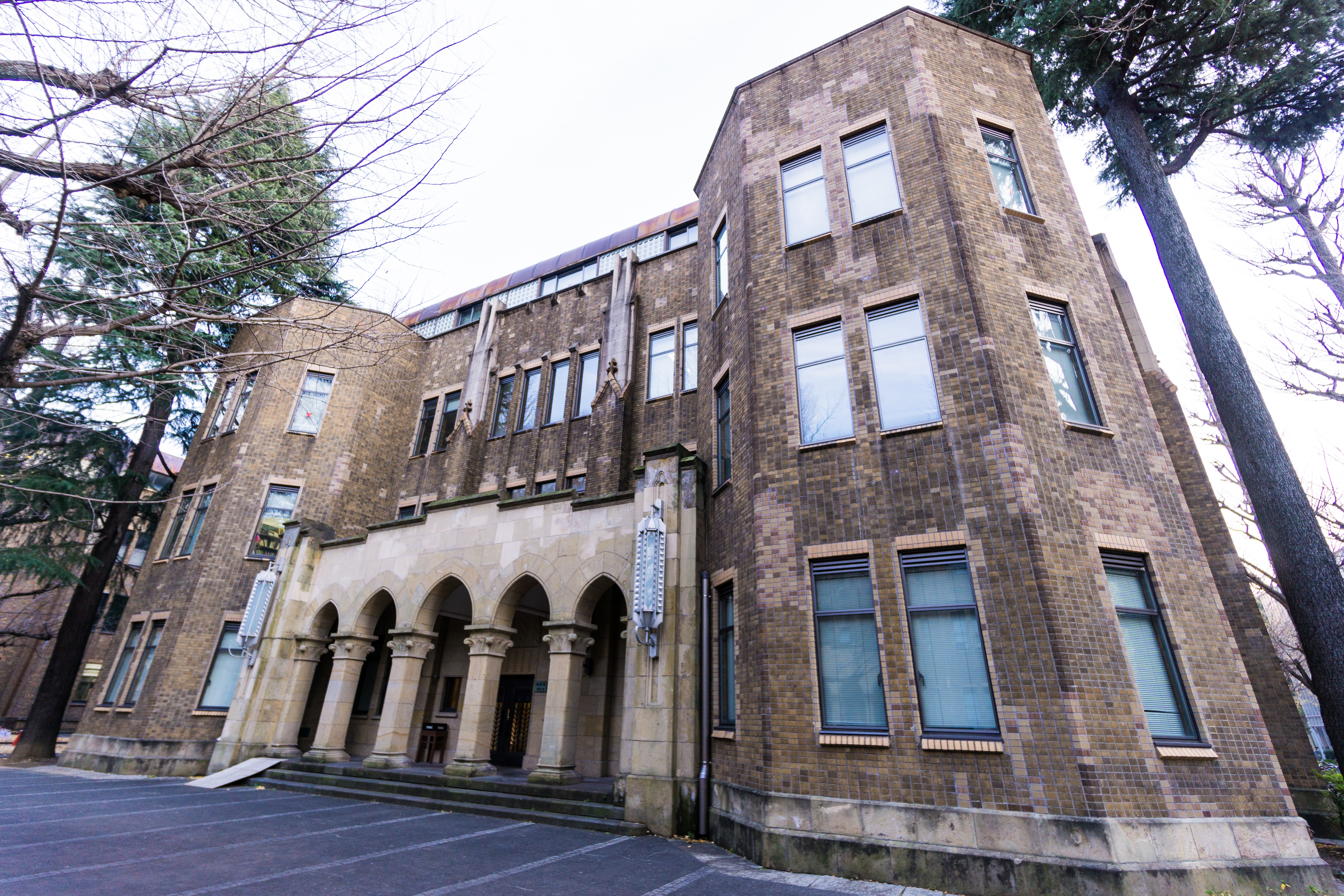
- Faculty of Law Building 3, 2014
- Established: April 12, 1877
- Dean: Ryuji Yamamoto
- Location: Tokyo, Japan
- Campus: Urban
- Website: https://www.j.u-tokyo.ac.jp/en/

Faculty of Law (東京大学法学部) is one of the 10 constituent faculties, and Graduate Schools for Law and Politics (東京大学大学院法学政治学研究科) is one of the constituent 15 graduate schools at the University of Tokyo. The Faculty and the Graduate School operate as one.

Faculty of Law is one of the oldest 4 faculties (Science, Medicine, Law and Letters) of the University of Tokyo and the oldest law school in Japan. Most of Japan's high-level bureaucrats are graduates of the University of Tokyo's Faculty of Law, and it has long produced political and judicial establishment in Japan.

== Degree programs ==
=== Undergraduate Programs at Faculty of Law ===
As with other undergraduate programs at the University of Tokyo, students move from the College of Arts and Sciences to the faculties of Advanced Studies. Faculty of Law offers Bachelor of Laws in Law and Politics.

The courses are as follows:

- I (General Legal Studies Course) (equivalent to the former course II)
- II (Law Profession Course) (equivalent to the former course I)
- III (Political Science Course)

Courses prior to 2017 are listed below.

- I (Private Law Course)
- II (Public Law Course)
- III (Political Science Course)

=== Graduate programs at Graduate Schools for Law and Politics ===
The Graduate Schools for Law and Politics offers academic programs and a J.D. program (専門職学位課程) equivalent to law school.

- School of Legal and Political Studies:
  - Doctoral Degree in Legal and Political Studies
  - Master's Degree in Legal and Political Studies
- School of Law:
  - J.D.

== Centers ==
The Faculty of Law has three centers as follows.

- Law Library, University of Tokyo
- Institute of Business Law and Comparative Law and Politics (IBC)
- Center for Modern Japanese Legal and Political Documents

== Alumni ==
Fifteen Japanese prime ministers are graduates of this Faculty, (Takaaki Kato, Reijiro Wakatsuki, Osachi Hamaguchi, Koki Hirota, Kiichiro Hiranuma, Kijuro Shidehara, Shigeru Yoshida, Tetsu Katayama, Hitoshi Ashida, Ichiro Hatoyama, Nobusuke Kishi, Eisaku Sato, Takeo Fukuda, Yasuhiro Nakasone, Kiichi Miyazawa). As of February 2025, two thirds of the justiceships at the Supreme Court of Japan (11 out of 15) are held by alumni of this faculty.

Outside Japan, the faculty is the alma mater of all four Japanese judges of the International Court of Justice (ICJ): Kōtarō Tanaka, Shigeru Oda, Hisashi Owada and Yuji Iwasawa. Yuji Iwasawa has served as the president of the ICJ since March 2025. Tomoko Akane has served as the president of the International Criminal Court (ICC) since March 2024.

== See also ==
- Graduate School of Public Policy, University of Tokyo
