= Graduate School of Medicine and Faculty of Medicine, University of Tokyo =

Medical school in Tokyo, Japan

Coordinates: 35.7108°N 139.7621°E

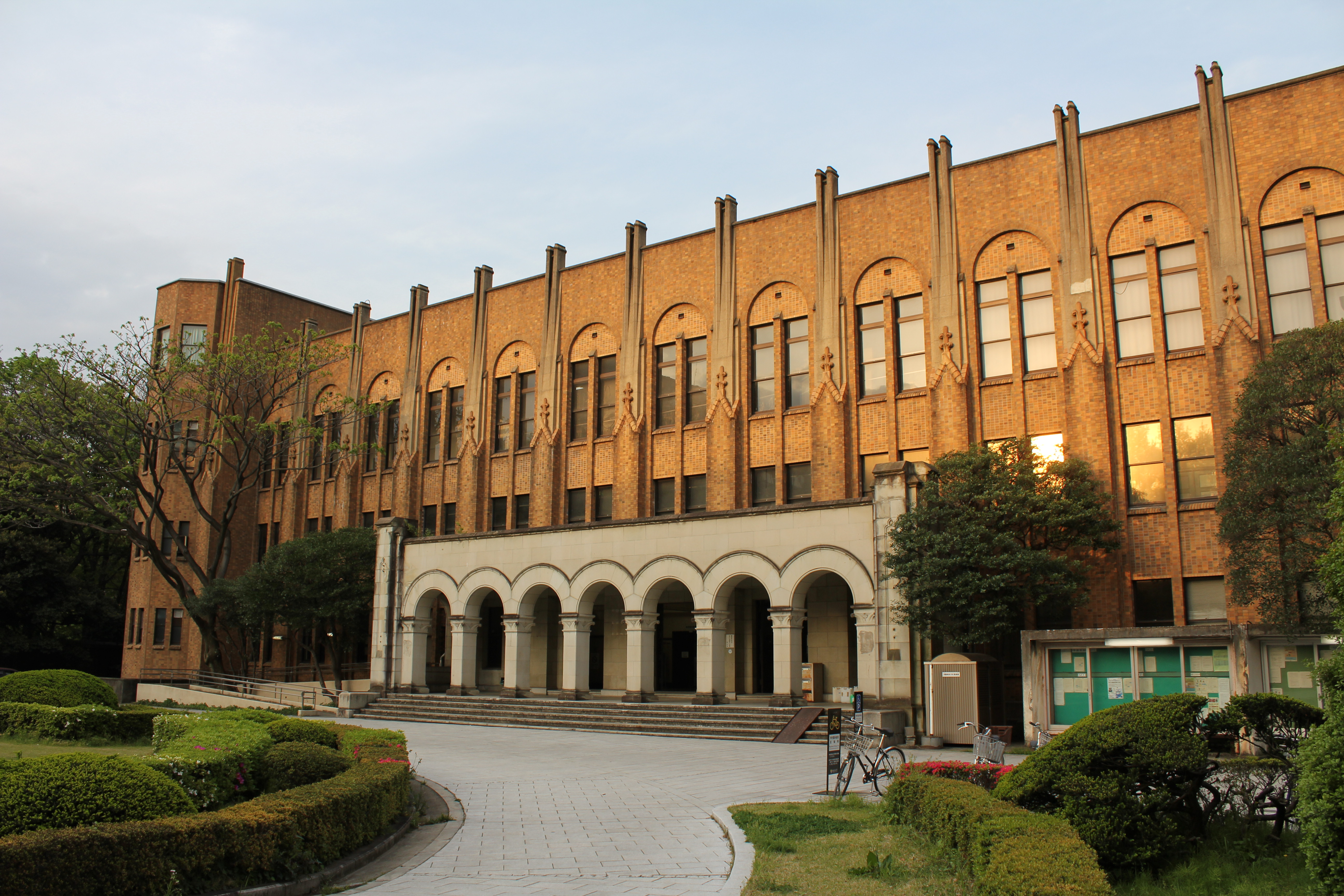
Med. Bldg. 2

The Graduate School of Medicine and Faculty of Medicine, University of Tokyo are a single, merged department at the University of Tokyo. The Faculty of Medicine (東京大学医学部) is one of the 10 constituent faculties, and the Graduate School of Medicine (東京大学大学院医学系研究科) is one of the 15 constituent graduate schools at University of Tokyo. The Faculty of Medicine was founded in 1877 and is one of the four oldest faculties (along with the Faculties of Science, Medicine, Law, and Letters) at the University of Tokyo.

== Degree Programs ==
=== Faculty of Medicine (Undergraduate Courses) ===
- School of Medicine (6-year medical degree program)
- School of Integrated Health Sciences (4-year bachelor's degree program)

=== Graduate School of Medicine (Graduate Courses) ===
The following programs are not medical degrees.

- PhD MD course
- Master's Program
  - Health Sciences and Nursing
  - International Health / Global Health Sciences
  - Medical Science
    - Molecular Cell Biology
    - Functional Biology
    - Pathology, Immunology and Microbiology
    - Radiology and Biomedical Engineering
    - Neuroscience
    - Social Medicine
    - Center for Disease Biology and Integrative Medicine
- Master’s Program (Public Health Nursing Course / Nursing Course)
- Professional Degree Course
  - School of Public Health
- Doctoral Program
  - Health Sciences and Nursing
  - International Health
- Doctoral Program in Medicine
