= René Schneebauer =

Austrian footballer (born 1998)

Personal information
- Date of birth: 14 June 1998 (age 28)
- Position: Midfielder

Team information
- Current team: SC Imst
- Number: 6

Youth career
- 2004–2007: SK Rietz
- 2007–2012: FC Wacker Innsbruck
- 2012–2016: AKA Tirol

Senior career*
Years	Team	Apps	(Gls)
2015–2017	WSG Wattens II	35	(2)
2016–2018	WSG Wattens	2	(0)
2018	→ SV Wörgl (loan)	5	(0)
2018–2020	SPG Silz/Mötz		
2020–	SC Imst	57	(1)
- * Club domestic league appearances and goals as of 26 June 2026

René Schneebauer (born 14 June 1998) is an Austrian football player. He plays for SC Imst.

== Club career ==
He made his Austrian Football First League debut for WSG Wattens on 14 October 2016 in a game against SC Wiener Neustadt.

== Personal life ==
His twin brother Niko Schneebauer is also a football player.
