= Elmeri Laamanen =

Finnish ice hockey defenceman

- Born: October 24, 1994 (age 31) Mikkeli, Finland
- Height: 6 ft 3 in (191 cm)
- Weight: 205 lb (93 kg; 14 st 9 lb)
- Position: Defence
- Shoots: Left
- team Former teams: Free agent Jukurit; Jokipojat; SaPKo
- Playing career: 2012–present

Elmeri Laamanen (born October 24, 1994) is a Finnish professional ice hockey defenceman.

Laamanen made his professional debut with Jukurit of Mestis during the 2012–13 season, while also splitting the season with their U20 squad as well as a loan spell with Hydraulic Oilers of Suomi-sarja. He continued to divide his time between Jukurit's main and U20 squads until 2015 when he joined Jokipojat. After just one season with Jokipojat, Lammanen moved to SaPKo on May 24, 2016. He would re-sign with the team for two further seasons before leaving in 2019. In total, Lammanen played in 211 regular season games in Mestis over seven seasons.

On June 29, 2019, Laamanen moved to France and signed for FFHG Division 1 team Remparts de Tours. He was released from the team in December of the same year after playing just 12 league games.
