= Jukka Laamanen =

Finnish ice hockey player

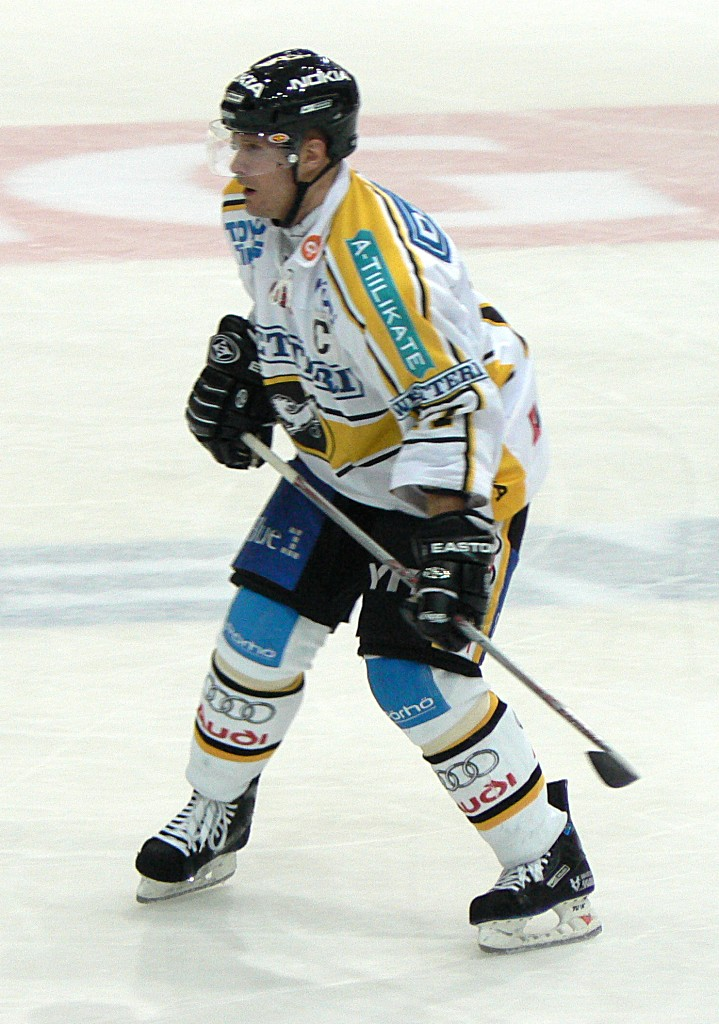
- Finnish ice hockey defenceman Jukka-Pekka Laamanen of Kärpät Oulu in an away game against Ilves Tampere.
- Born: October 4, 1976 (age 49) Savonlinna, Finland
- Height: 5 ft 10 in (178 cm)
- Weight: 181 lb (82 kg; 12 st 13 lb)
- Position: Defence
- Shoots: Left
- SM-liiga team Former teams: HPK; Tappara; Ilves; Ässät; Kärpät
- National team: Finland
- Playing career: 1995–present

Jukka Laamanen (born October 4, 1976) is a Finnish professional ice hockey player who currently plays for HPK in the SM-liiga.

== Career statistics ==
| | | | Regular season | | | | | Playoffs |
| Season | Team | League | GP | G | A | Pts | PIM | GP | G | A | Pts | PIM |
|---|---|---|---|---|---|---|---|---|---|---|---|---|
| 1993–94 | SaPKo U20 | U20 I-divisioona | 23 | 6 | 17 | 23 | 28 | — | — | — | — | — |
| 1994–95 | SaPKo U20 | U20 I-divisioona | 9 | 2 | 10 | 12 | 6 | — | — | — | — | — |
| 1994–95 | SaPKo | I-Divisioona | 40 | 8 | 11 | 19 | 28 | 4 | 1 | 0 | 1 | 8 |
| 1995–96 | JYP U20 | U20 SM-liiga | 6 | 1 | 3 | 4 | 2 | 6 | 0 | 2 | 2 | 4 |
| 1995–96 | JyP HT | SM-liiga | 36 | 1 | 1 | 2 | 34 | — | — | — | — | — |
| 1995–96 | Diskos | I-Divisioona | 1 | 0 | 1 | 1 | 2 | — | — | — | — | — |
| 1996–97 | SaPKo | I-Divisioona | 43 | 5 | 31 | 36 | 72 | — | — | — | — | — |
| 1997–98 | SaPKo | I-Divisioona | 34 | 6 | 15 | 21 | 59 | — | — | — | — | — |
| 1998–99 | SaPKo | I-Divisioona | 46 | 6 | 26 | 32 | 82 | — | — | — | — | — |
| 1999–00 | Tappara | SM-liiga | 5 | 0 | 1 | 1 | 2 | — | — | — | — | — |
| 1999–00 | Kokkolan Hermes | I-Divisioona | 10 | 0 | 5 | 5 | 20 | 3 | 0 | 0 | 0 | 4 |
| 2000–01 | Jukurit | Mestis | 31 | 5 | 20 | 25 | 46 | — | — | — | — | — |
| 2000–01 | Ilves | SM-liiga | 2 | 0 | 0 | 0 | 2 | — | — | — | — | — |
| 2001–02 | Porin Ässät | SM-liiga | 53 | 8 | 21 | 29 | 72 | — | — | — | — | — |
| 2002–03 | Ilves | SM-liiga | 55 | 7 | 14 | 21 | 72 | — | — | — | — | — |
| 2003–04 | Ilves | SM-liiga | 56 | 10 | 11 | 21 | 52 | 7 | 0 | 2 | 2 | 12 |
| 2004–05 | HPK | SM-liiga | 55 | 15 | 21 | 36 | 88 | 10 | 1 | 4 | 5 | 8 |
| 2005–06 | HPK | SM-liiga | 55 | 13 | 19 | 32 | 86 | 12 | 5 | 3 | 8 | 12 |
| 2006–07 | Oulun Kärpät | SM-liiga | 55 | 10 | 26 | 36 | 96 | 9 | 0 | 4 | 4 | 12 |
| 2007–08 | Oulun Kärpät | SM-liiga | 52 | 10 | 20 | 30 | 62 | 15 | 1 | 7 | 8 | 10 |
| 2008–09 | HPK | SM-liiga | 52 | 9 | 15 | 24 | 80 | 2 | 0 | 1 | 1 | 6 |
| 2009–10 | HPK | SM-liiga | 58 | 12 | 19 | 31 | 84 | 17 | 1 | 7 | 8 | 18 |
| 2010–11 | HPK | SM-liiga | 53 | 10 | 16 | 26 | 32 | 2 | 1 | 0 | 1 | 2 |
| 2011–12 | HPK | SM-liiga | 57 | 7 | 16 | 23 | 50 | — | — | — | — | — |
| SM-liiga totals | | | 644 | 112 | 200 | 312 | 812 | 74 | 9 | 28 | 37 | 80 |
