= Niko Gotsiridze =

Georgian actor (1871–1949)

- Born: February 16, 1871; Tbilisi, Russian Empire
- Died: July 30, 1949 (aged 78); Tbilisi, Georgian SSR, USSR
- Occupations: actor, director

Niko Gotsiridze (Georgian: ნიკოლოზ (ნიკო) სიმონის ძე გოცირიძე, Russian: Нико Гоциридзе; 16 February 1871 – 30 July 1949) was a Georgian actor, director and a comedian who charmed spectators with his sense of humor. For fifteen years he managed the Tbilisi Ossetian Theatre.

Gotsiridze was the son of a tailor, but loved the stage, and first took to the boards at the age of twelve. He developed a comedy act and played the local working-class establishments until, in 1922, he joined a professional touring troupe under the director Kote Marjanishvili (Марджановым). He was much lauded and in 1924 he was made a People's Artist of the Georgia SSR.

== Awards ==
- People's artist of the Georgian SSR – 1924
- Order of the Badge of Honour
