= Niko Palonen =

Finnish ice hockey player

- Born: 30 January 1989 (age 36) Pori, Finland
- Height: 6 ft 2 in (188 cm)
- Weight: 205 lb (93 kg; 14 st 9 lb)
- Position: Forward
- Shot: Right
- Played for: Ässät
- NHL draft: Undrafted
- Playing career: 2008–2017

Niko Palonen (born 30 January 1989) is a Finnish former professional ice hockey forward who played for Ässät of the SM-liiga.
