= Niko Schneebauer =

Austrian footballer (born 1998)

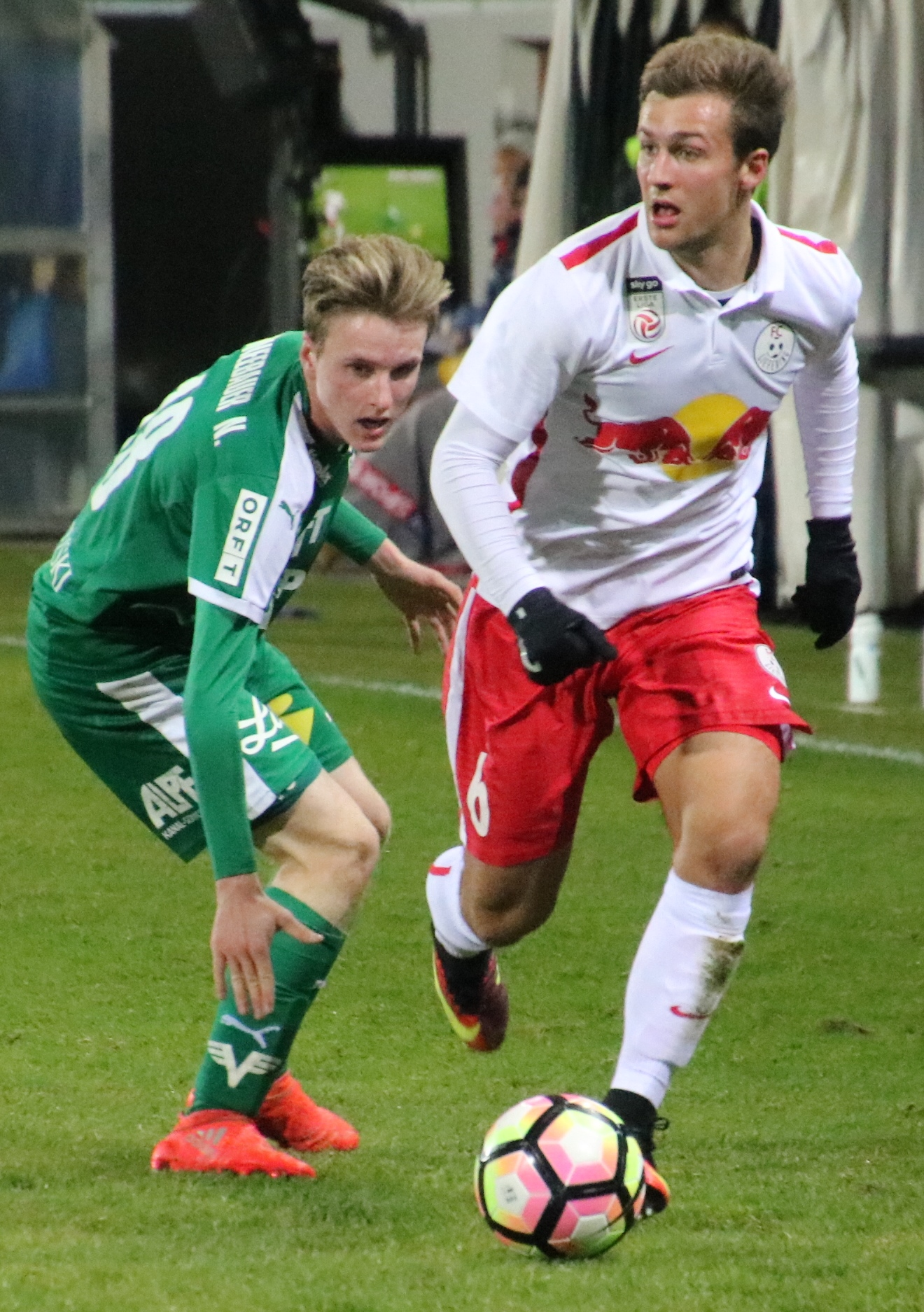
- Schneebauer (L) with WSG Wattens in 2016

Personal information
- Date of birth: 14 June 1998 (age 28)
- Position: Midfielder

Team information
- Current team: SC Imst
- Number: 7

Youth career
- 2004–2007: SK Rietz
- 2007–2013: Wacker Innsbruck
- 2013–2014: FC Zirl
- 2014: Wacker Innsbruck
- 2014–2016: WSG Wattens

Senior career*
| Years | Team | Apps | (Gls) |
| 2016–2018 | WSG Wattens | 17 | (0) |
| 2018 | → SV Wörgl (loan) | 11 | (1) |
| 2018–2019 | FC Kufstein | 23 | (1) |
| 2019– | SC Imst | 8 | (0) |
- * Club domestic league appearances and goals as of 23:02, 5 September 2019 (UTC)

Niko Schneebauer (born 14 June 1998) is an Austrian football player. He plays for SC Imst.

== Club career ==
He made his Austrian Football First League debut for WSG Wattens on 16 August 2016 in a game against Kapfenberger SV.

== Personal life ==
His twin brother René Schneebauer is also a football player.
