= Niko Tskhvedadze =

Georgian educator (b. 1845, d. 1911)

- ნიკო ცხვედაძე
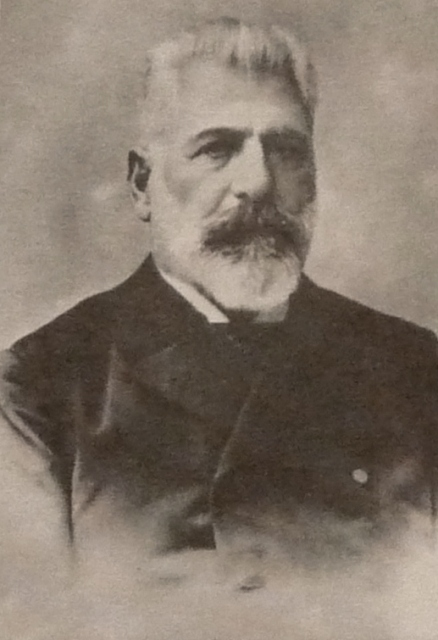
- Born: 8 January 1845; Sojin, Georgia Governorate, Russian Empire (present-day Kvemo Kartli, Georgia)
- Died: 30 October 1911 (aged 66)
- Resting place: Tbilisi State University, Tbilisi
- Occupations: Teacher, publicist, writer, humanist

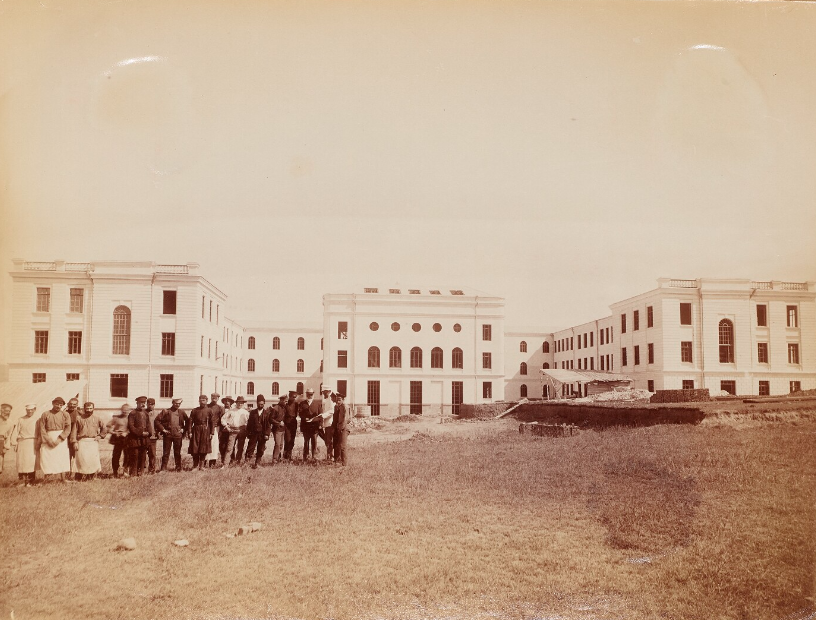
Niko Tskhvedadze Directing Tbilisi State University's Construction

Nikoloz Zebedes dze Tskhvedadze (Georgian: ნიკოლოზ ზებედეს ძე ცხვედაძე, 8 January 1845 – 30 October 1911) was a Georgian teacher, educator, writer, and publicist. He was one of the founders and members of the Society for the Spreading of Literacy among Georgians and played a crucial role in the establishment of Tbilisi State University.

== Life ==
Niko Tskhvedadze born in the village of Sojin in the Tskhinvali district in 1845. His early childhood was spent in the village of Kavtiskhevi.

He received his primary education at the Tbilisi Theological School, and later continued his studies at the Tbilisi Theological Seminary. From 1865 to 1869, he pursued studies at the Moscow Theological Academy. After his graduation, he began his career as a teacher in Tbilisi schools. Starting in 1869, he was appointed as a teacher at the Tbilisi Theological Seminary, where Iakob Gogebashvili also taught concurrently. However, following a revision a few years later, both Niko Tskhvedadze and Iakob Gogebashvili were dismissed from the seminary on charges of instigating patriotic sentiments among students.

In 1874, he commenced teaching history, pedagogy, and geography at the Tbilisi Women's Institute. Simultaneously, he taught at St. Nino's school. During this period, he established close connections with Ilia Chavchavadze, Dimitri Kipiani, and Iakob Gogebashvili, dedicating 40 years of tireless service to his country.

He played a pivotal role in founding the Society for Spreading Literacy among Georgians. He authored its charter, served as a board member, and from 1899 to 1907, held the position of deputy chairman. In 1877, he undertook a journey to Western European countries to study the organization and methodology of public education. He subsequently published an article titled "Short Notes from Abroad" in the Iveria newspaper. Throughout the 1870s and 1880s, he actively participated in journalistic endeavors, contributing numerous newspaper and magazine articles and essays, including pieces like "Commuting between Russia and Georgia in 1492–1664," "The Intellectual and Economic Movement of Western Europe with Its Causes in the 16th Century," and "Education of Our People, Crafts, and Farming."

Under his initiative and direct leadership, schools were established in Baku, Vladikavkaz, and Batumi, aiming to provide education in the Georgian language for the local population.

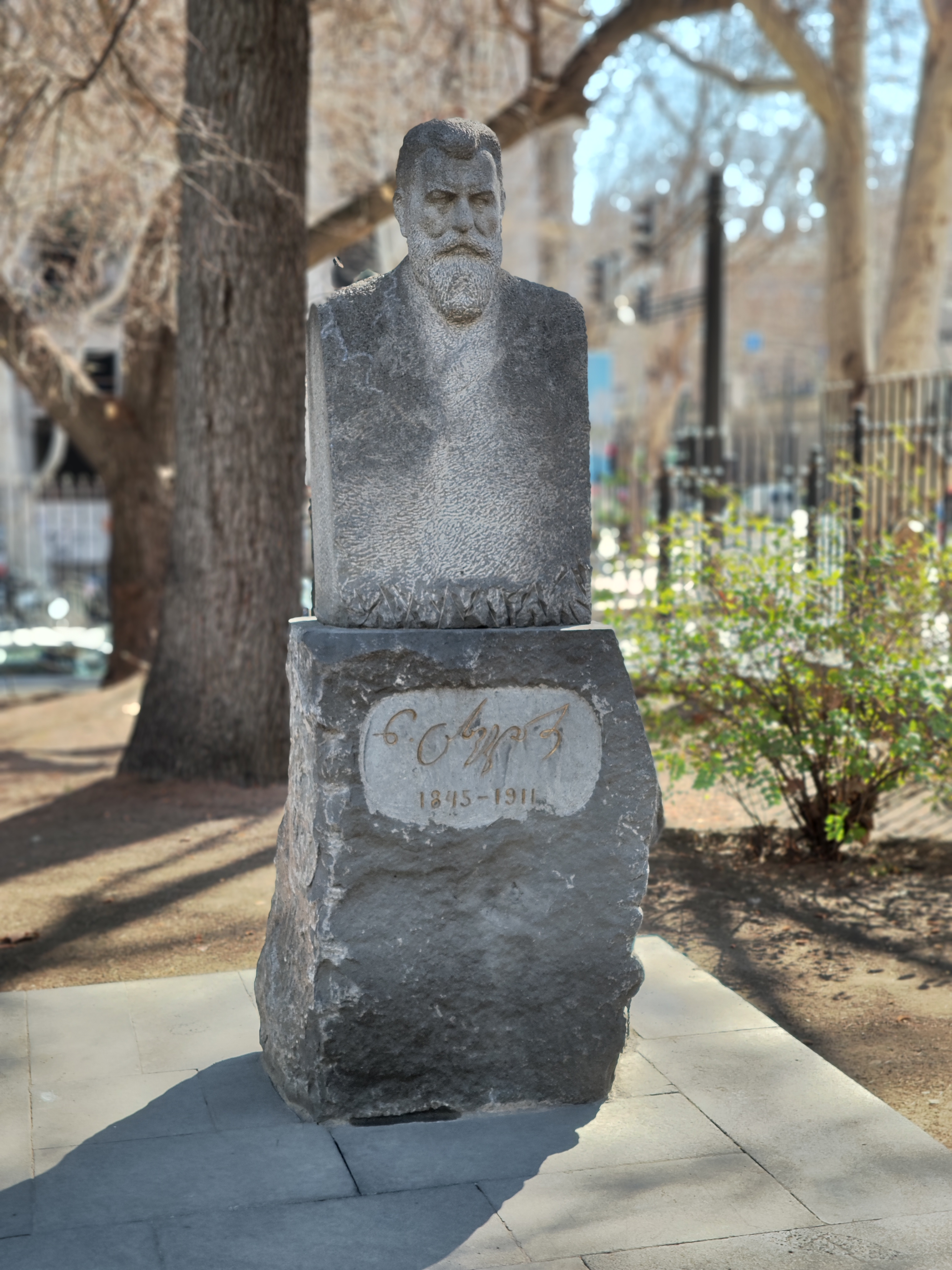
The monument of Niko Tskhvedadze, Tbilisi State University Pantheon, Tbilisi

Between 1889 and 1892, Niko Tskhvedadze served as a member and advisor of the Tbilisi City Council. He actively participated in school commissions that reviewed and accepted the reorganization project for Tbilisi city schools, which he had prepared. Additionally, he held roles on the board committee of Tbilisi Georgian Gymnasium, where he served as deputy chairman.

In 1898, Niko Tskhvedadze initiated the construction of a new building for Tiflis Noble Gymnasium, which he later presented as the future site of Tbilisi University. He personally led the efforts to raise funds for the construction, which was completed in 1906. While he did not live to see the university inaugurated, he held a firm belief that the building would eventually house Georgian professors and students.

Following his passing, he was laid to rest in the Didube Pantheon of Writers and Public Figures. On November 26, 2008, his remains were transferred to the pantheon of Ivane Javakhishvili Tbilisi State University.

== Niko Tskhvedadze's Role in Constructing Tbilisi State University ==
The construction and development of the future building of the first University in caucasus Tbilisi State University were spearheaded by Niko. His role in overseeing the construction was pivotal to the university's establishment.

Niko Tskhvedadze, an influential figure within the Society for Spreading Literacy among Georgians, played a fundamental role in shaping the architectural landscape and educational prospects of the university. His vision and dedicated efforts significantly contributed to the realisation of the university's physical structures, which have since stood as enduring symbols of academic excellence and knowledge dissemination in Georgia.
