= Niko Laakkonen =

Finnish ice hockey winger

- Born: June 18, 1988 (age 36); Varkaus, Finland
- Height: 5 ft 10 in (178 cm)
- Weight: 187 lb (85 kg; 13 st 5 lb)
- Position: Winger
- Shot: Left
- Played for: Jukurit
- Playing career: 2009–2017

Niko Laakkonen (born June 15, 1988) is a Finnish former professional ice hockey winger.

Laakkonen began his career with KalPa's Jr. teams between 2003 and 2009. Unable to make it to KalPa's main roster, he signed for SaPKo in Mestis. After four seasons, Laakkonen joined Jukurit in 2013. Jukurit were promoted to Liiga for the 2016–17 season to replace Blues who folded due to bankruptcy. Laakkonen played 34 games in Liiga for Jukurit, but failed to score and single goal and managed just three assists. It turned out to be his last professional season.

== Career statistics ==
			Regular season					Playoffs
Season	Team	League	GP	G	A	Pts	PIM	GP	G	A	Pts	PIM
2003–04	KalPa U16	U16 SM-sarja	22	11	14	25	0	7	3	1	4	0
2004–05	KalPa U18 II	U18 I-Divisioona	—	—	—	—	—	—	—	—	—	—
2005–06	KalPa U18	U18 SM-sarja	34	10	12	22	14	—	—	—	—	—
2006–07	KalPa T U20	U20 2. Divisioona	16	12	21	33	10	—	—	—	—	—
2007–08	KalPa U20	U20 SM-liiga	33	2	0	2	6	11	0	0	0	0
2008–09	KalPa U20	U20 SM-liiga	33	6	16	22	16	5	0	0	0	0
2009–10	SaPKo	Mestis	30	3	1	4	4	—	—	—	—	—
2010–11	SaPKo	Mestis	48	10	15	25	22	3	2	0	2	0
2011–12	SaPKo	Mestis	45	14	17	31	6	5	1	1	2	2
2012–13	SaPKo	Mestis	44	11	24	35	8	—	—	—	—	—
2013–14	Mikkelin Jukurit	Mestis	56	17	16	33	14	19	3	10	13	4
2014–15	Mikkelin Jukurit	Mestis	55	14	19	33	39	13	5	1	6	0
2015–16	Mikkelin Jukurit	Mestis	45	14	21	35	28	15	5	2	7	4
2016–17	Mikkelin Jukurit	Liiga	34	0	3	3	8	—	—	—	—	—
2016–17	Iisalmen Peli-Karhut	Mestis	7	4	0	4	0	—	—	—	—	—
Liiga totals			34	0	3	3	8	—	—	—	—	—
Mestis totals			330	87	113	200	121	55	16	14	30	10
