= Niko Guido =

Turkish photographer

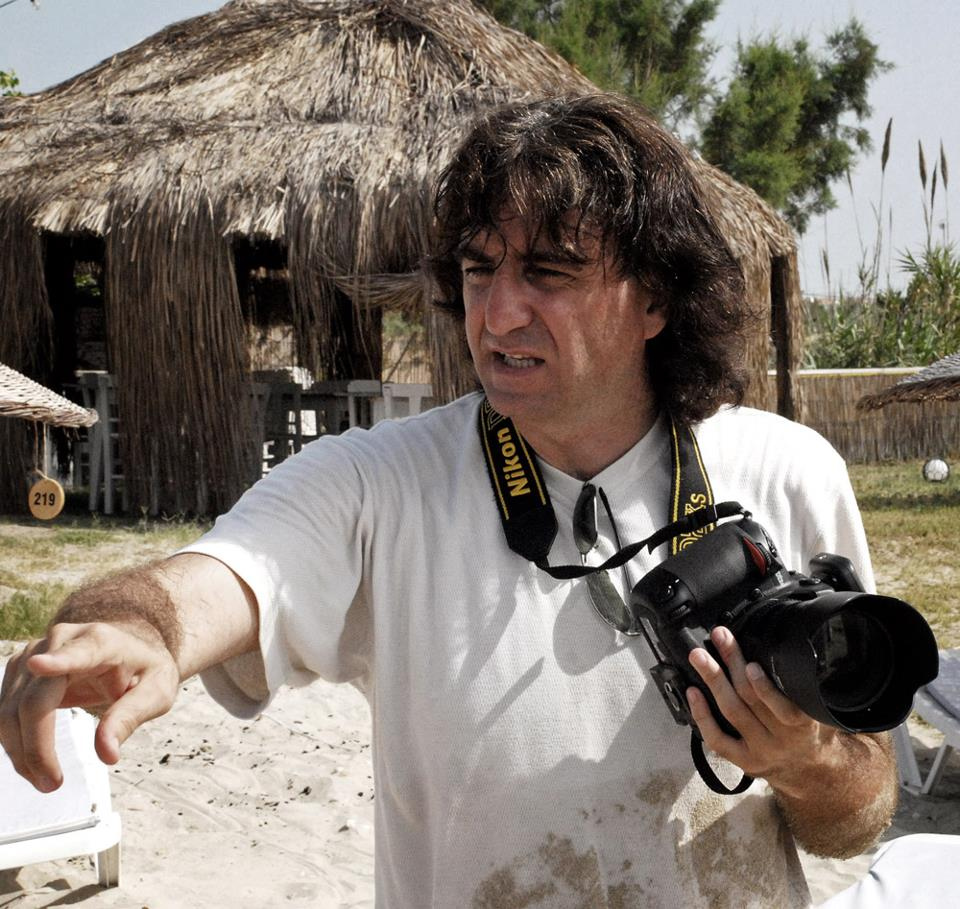
- Niko Guido
- Born: Necip Yanmaz; March 25, 1966 (age 60); Istanbul, Turkey
- Citizenship: Turkish; French
- Occupation: Photographer
- Years active: 2006–present

Niko Guido (born 1966, Istanbul) is a Turkish-French photographer.

After finishing Galatasaray High School, he graduated from Boğaziçi University. He opened exhibitions in Venice, Paris, İzmir and İstanbul; his photographs have published on magazines and newspapers.

Then he has held exhibitions in more than 40 cities in Turkey and all around the world, while his photographs have been featured in many local and international newspapers and magazines. His success in nude photography brought him a respectable reputation on the international scene.

Following his collaboration on the photography project “Unobstructed Laughter” in support of The Spinal Cord Paralytics Association of Turkey, he traveled the world to portray life in different countries. The photographs he took during those journeys have been published in numerous magazines including National Geographic.

After the Haiti Earthquake, he collaborated with UNICEF, an organization he later worked with to organize the exhibition Van İçin Destek (Support for Van) which brought together 30 master photographers.

As part of the anti-war project Leave Us Alone, which he realized with Doctors without Borders on the 10th anniversary of the Iraq War, his photographs were simultaneously exhibited in 32 cities around the world, making it the world’s largest photography exhibition.

Niko Guido, has organized more than 60 exhibitions in Turkey and abroad.

Niko Guido opened the exhibition “Artist as an Art Object” for the benefit of the Turkish Education Foundation in 2014 and continues to contribute to the art of photography with his many projects. In specific, Guido initiated or provided guidance for the following projects:

I’m Istanbul, Istanbul 365 Days, Women’s Eye, 14 Cities, PhotoMarathon, Human Stories

In 2013, Guido received the special jury award at the FIAP World Cup, one of the world’s most prestigious photography competitions. The artist continues to explore and portray the world, and to realize an array of projects with his group, PhotoTravelers.

== Awards ==
- World Championship, (Batterphoto 2007, "Water Muse")

== Newspapers, Magazines, Books ==
- Nude Art Today, (2008-2009, France)
- National Geographic

== Exhibitions ==
Exhibition	Role	Location	Year	Benefactor
Smiles Without Handicap	Individual Exhibitionist	Istanbul	2008	Association of Paralyzed in Turkey
Nudo a Venezia	Individual Exhibitionist	Venice	2008	
Real	Individual Exhibitionist	Istanbul	2008	
Haiti Suite	Individual Exhibitionist	Paris	2010	Unicef
Haiti Aftermath	Individual Exhibitionist	Izmir	2010	Unicef
Haiti Aftermath	Individual Exhibitionist	Istanbul	2010	Unicef
Naked	Individual Exhibitionist	Istanbul	2011	
Hope for Van	Curator	Istanbul	2011	Unicef
Leave Us Alone - Anti War Photography Project	Individual Exhibitionist	Istanbul	2013	Doctors Without Borders
Leave Us Alone - Anti War Photography Project	Individual Exhibitionist	Paris	2013	Doctors Without Borders
Leave Us Alone - Anti War Photography Project	Individual Exhibitionist	London	2013	Doctors Without Borders
Leave Us Alone - Anti War Photography Project	Individual Exhibitionist	Stockholm	2013	Doctors Without Borders
Leave Us Alone - Anti War Photography Project	Individual Exhibitionist	Bangalore	2013	Doctors Without Borders
Leave Us Alone - Anti War Photography Project	Individual Exhibitionist	Cyprus	2013	Doctors Without Borders
Artist As Art Object	Individual Exhibitionist	Istanbul	2013	Turkish Education Foundation
Artist As Art Object	Individual Exhibitionist	Istanbul	2021	Turkish Education Foundation
The Woman's Eye	Curator	Nancy, France	2016	

== Photography Projects ==
Project	Year	Partner
South America	2009	
Cuba	2010	
Japan-Myanmar	2011	
India-Nepal-Sri Lanka	2013	
Brasil	2014	
Laos-Cambodia-Vietnam	2015	
Morocco	2014	
Philippines	2014	
Australia	2015	
USA-Russia	2016	
Israel-Peru-Bolivia	2017	
Tanzania	2018	
Uzbekistan-South Africa-Madagascar	2019	
Protesting Gold Mines	2007	
Scream of Allianoi	2008	
Protesting Sea Pollution	2009	
Haiti Aftermath	2010	Unicef
Protesting Polygamy	2011	
The Artist as Art Object	2013	Turkish Education Foundation
Leave us Alone	2013	Doctors Without Borders
The Woman's Eye	2016	

== Documentaries and TV Shows ==
Title	Location	Genre !
A Frame to Life	Haiti	Documentary
About Photography	Istanbul / Izmir / Konya	TV show
Photograph Wanderer	Venice	TV show
Photograph Wanderer	India	TV show
Photograph Wanderer	Sri Lanka	TV show
