= Niko Peltola =

Finnish ice hockey player

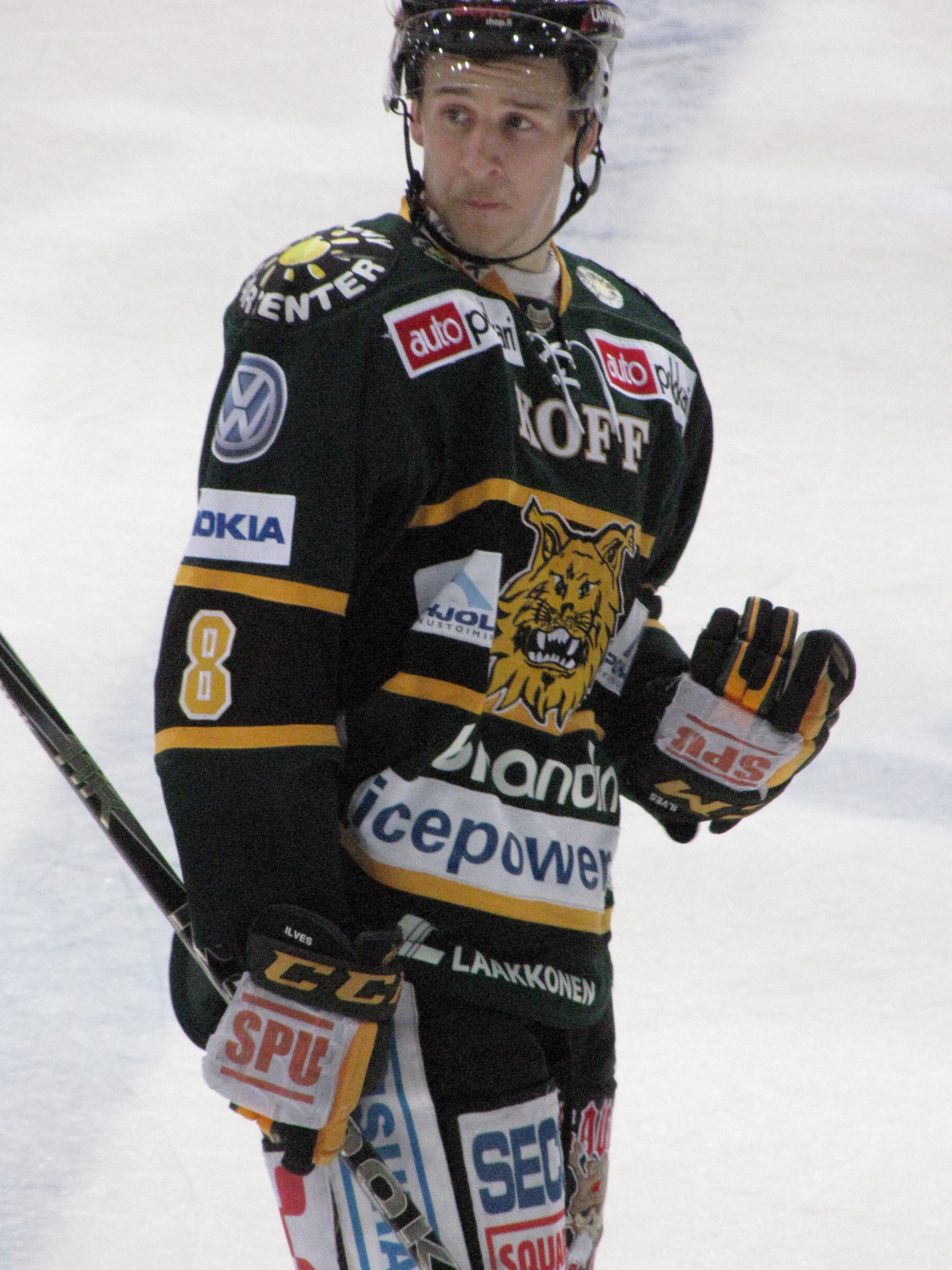
- Peltola with the Tampereen Ilves in 2012
- Born: June 1, 1990 (age 36) Huittinen, Finland
- Height: 6 ft 1 in (185 cm)
- Weight: 183 lb (83 kg; 13 st 1 lb)
- Position: Defence
- Shot: Left
- Played for: Ilves; Jokerit; Vaasan Sport; Ässät
- Playing career: 2010–2021

Niko Peltola (born June 1, 1990) is a Finnish former professional ice hockey defenceman who played for Ilves, Jokerit, Vaasan Sport and Ässät in the Liiga.

== Career statistics ==
			Regular season					Playoffs
Season	Team	League	GP	G	A	Pts	PIM	GP	G	A	Pts	PIM
2005–06	Porin Ässät U16	U16 SM-sarja Q	8	2	3	5	4	—	—	—	—	—
2005–06	Porin Ässät U16	U16 SM-sarja	8	1	1	2	0	—	—	—	—	—
2006–07	Porin Ässät U18	U18 SM-sarja	18	0	1	1	4	—	—	—	—	—
2006–07	Porin Ässät U18 II	U18 I-Divisioona	1	1	0	1	25	—	—	—	—	—
2007–08	LLuja	Suomi-sarja	19	3	4	7	65	—	—	—	—	—
2008–09	Vaasan Sport U20	U20 I-Divisioona Q	11	3	5	8	18	—	—	—	—	—
2008–09	Vaasan Sport U20	U20 I-Divisioona	20	5	6	11	30	—	—	—	—	—
2009–10	Vaasan Sport U20	U20 SM-liiga	37	11	11	22	56	—	—	—	—	—
2009–10	Vaasan Sport	Mestis	14	1	3	4	6	1	0	0	0	2
2010–11	Ilves U20	U20 SM-liiga	—	—	—	—	—	2	1	1	2	0
2010–11	Ilves	SM-liiga	57	6	5	11	48	4	0	1	1	0
2011–12	Ilves	SM-liiga	45	3	9	12	34	—	—	—	—	—
2011–12	LeKi	Mestis	4	0	1	1	2	—	—	—	—	—
2012–13	Ilves	SM-liiga	45	3	7	10	30	—	—	—	—	—
2013–14	Ilves	Liiga	17	2	3	5	10	—	—	—	—	—
2013–14	LeKi	Mestis	2	0	0	0	0	—	—	—	—	—
2013–14	Jokerit	Liiga	24	3	3	6	16	1	0	0	0	0
2014–15	Vaasan Sport	Liiga	28	1	9	10	12	—	—	—	—	—
2014–15	Jokerit	KHL	14	0	2	2	2	—	—	—	—	—
2014–15	Kiekko-Vantaa	Mestis	5	1	0	1	4	—	—	—	—	—
2015–16	Vaasan Sport	Liiga	56	2	16	18	26	2	0	0	0	0
2016–17	Porin Ässät	Liiga	59	3	15	18	20	3	0	0	0	0
2017–18	Porin Ässät	Liiga	60	2	11	13	22	7	0	0	0	4
2018–19	Porin Ässät	Liiga	39	0	8	8	38	—	—	—	—	—
2018–19	Ilves	Liiga	18	0	6	6	8	7	1	3	4	2
2019–20	Ilves	Liiga	55	5	25	30	24	—	—	—	—	—
2020–21	Ilves	Liiga	4	1	0	1	0	—	—	—	—	—
2021–22	Ilves	Liiga	11	0	0	0	6	—	—	—	—	—
Liiga totals			518	31	117	148	294	24	1	4	5	6
