= Koishikawa Botanical Garden =

Botanical garden in Tokyo, Japan

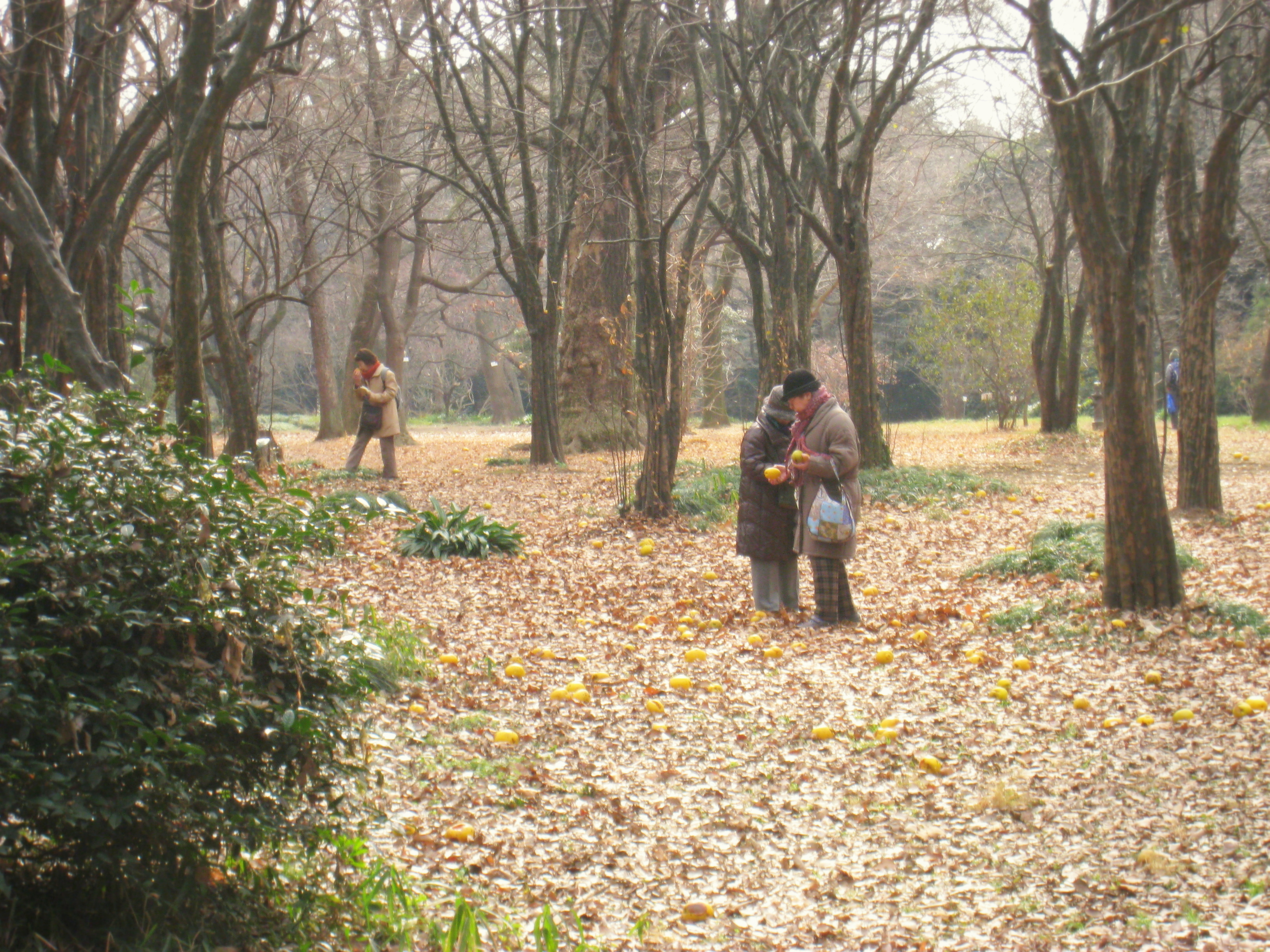
- In fall, 2008
- Interactive map of Koishikawa Botanical Garden
- Type: Botanical garden
- Location: Bunkyō, Tokyo, Japan
- Coordinates: 35°43′12″N 139°44′42″E
- Area: 70,847 m^{2} (762,590 ft^{2})
- Created: 1684
- National Historic Site of Japan National Place of Scenic Beauty

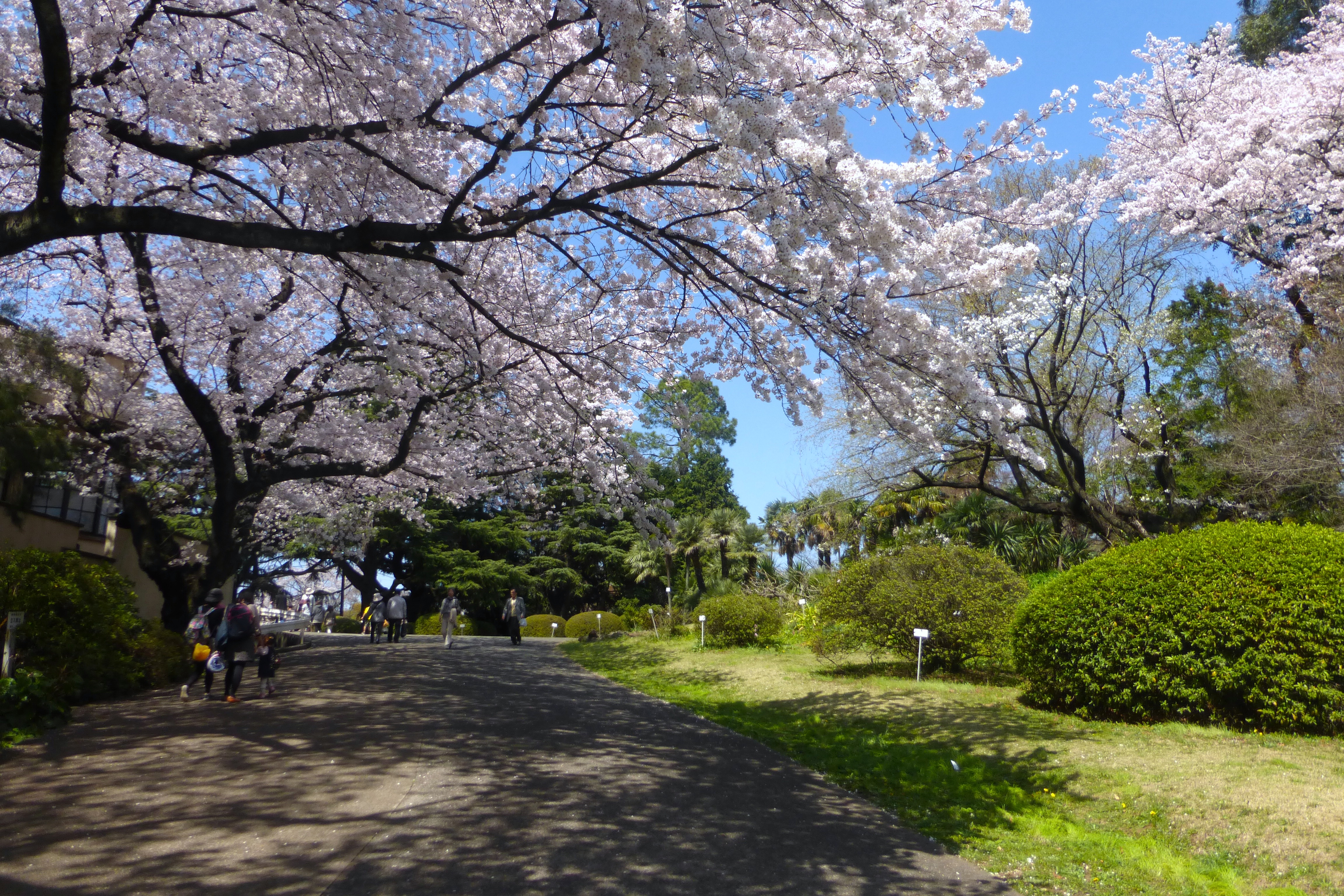
Cherry blossoms in spring, 2015

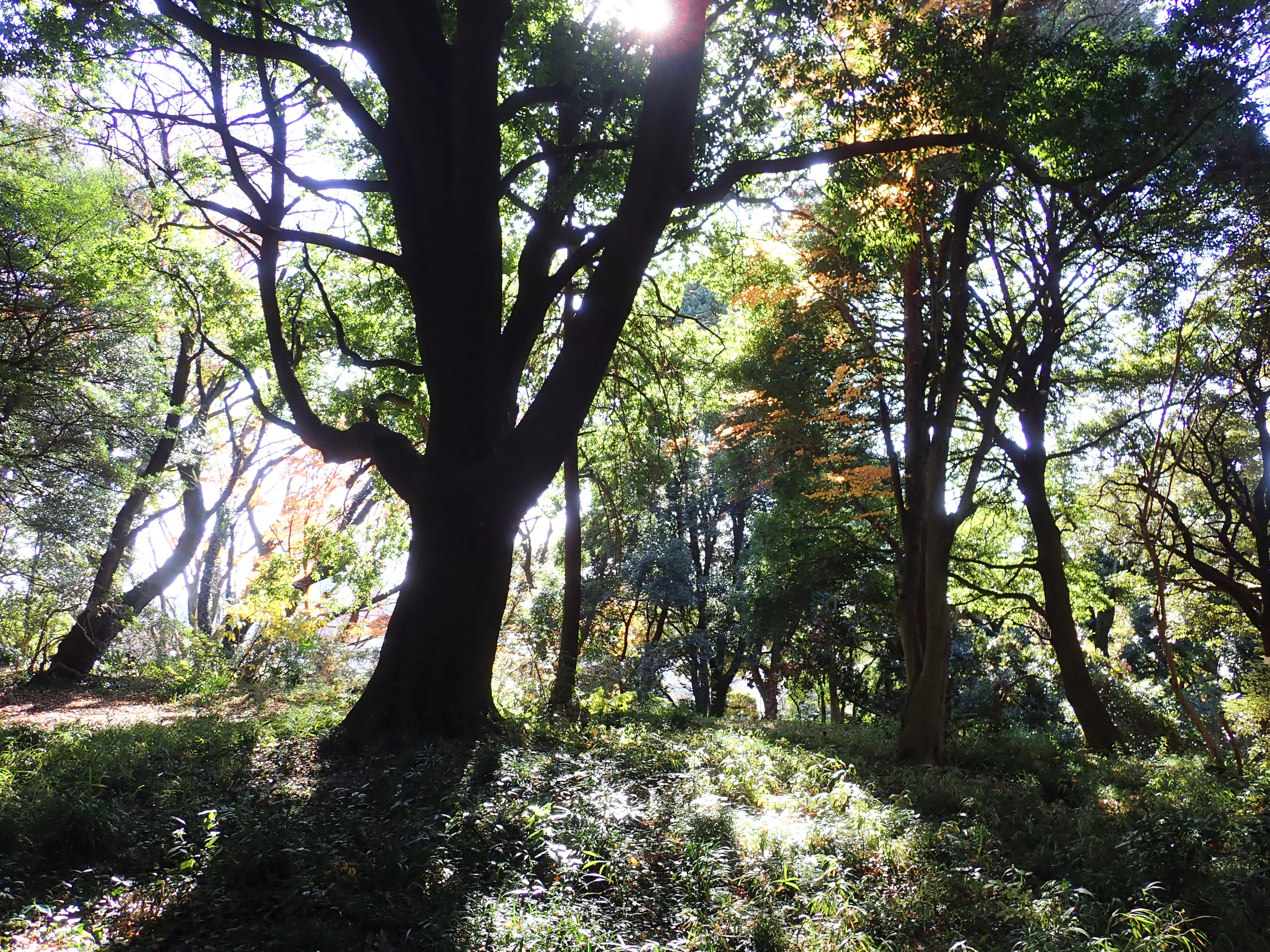
Sunbeams streaming through leaves in the Koishikawa Botanical Gardens

The Koishikawa Botanical Garden (小石川植物園, Koishikawa Shokubutsuen; 40 acres, 16 hectares) is a botanical garden with an arboretum operated by the University of Tokyo Graduate School of Science. They are located at 3-7-1 Hakusan, Bunkyō, Tokyo, Japan, and open daily except Mondays; an admission fee is charged.

== History ==
The Tokugawa shogunate opened two gardens in 1638 in Azabu and Ōtsuka neighborhoods of Edo for the purposes of growing medicinal herbs. In 1684, the Azabu gardens were abolished and relocated to Koishikawa, to the site of a villa owned by Shogun Tokugawa Tsunayoshi. At the time, it was called the Koishikawa Oyakuen (小石川御薬園, Koishikawa Medicinal Herb Garden). During the time of Shogun Tokugawa Yoshimune, the entire site of Tsunayoshi's former villa was given over to the garden. In 1722, in response to a petition made to Yoshimune's famous "suggestion box" by town doctor Ogawa Tadafune for a medical clinic to serve the needs of the lower classes, the machi-bugyō of Edo, Ōoka Tadasuke was ordered to create the Koishikawa Yojosho clinic.

In 1877, after the Meiji Restoration, the gardens became a part of Tokyo Imperial University and was the birthplace of Japanese botanical research. Today research activities are focused on the evolution, phylogenetic systematics, and physiology of higher plants. The garden's collections contain some 4,000 plant species, including 1,400 hardy woody species, 1,500 hardy herbaceous species, and 1,100 tropical and subtropical species. Notable outdoor collections include camellias, cherries, maples, Japanese primroses, bonsai trees, and alpine plants. A particular strength are the wild-collected species from Japan, Korea, Taiwan, and China.

The garden also contains a herbarium with 1.4 million specimens, and a library of 20,000 books and journals.

In 2012, it was designated by the national government as a National Place of Scenic Beauty and also a National Historic Site under the terms of the Cultural Assets Preservation Law.

== See also ==
- List of Places of Scenic Beauty of Japan (Tōkyō)
- List of Historic Sites of Japan (Tōkyō)
- List of botanical gardens in Japan
- Nikko Botanical Garden
