= Nikko Botanical Garden =

Botanical garden in Tochigi, Japan

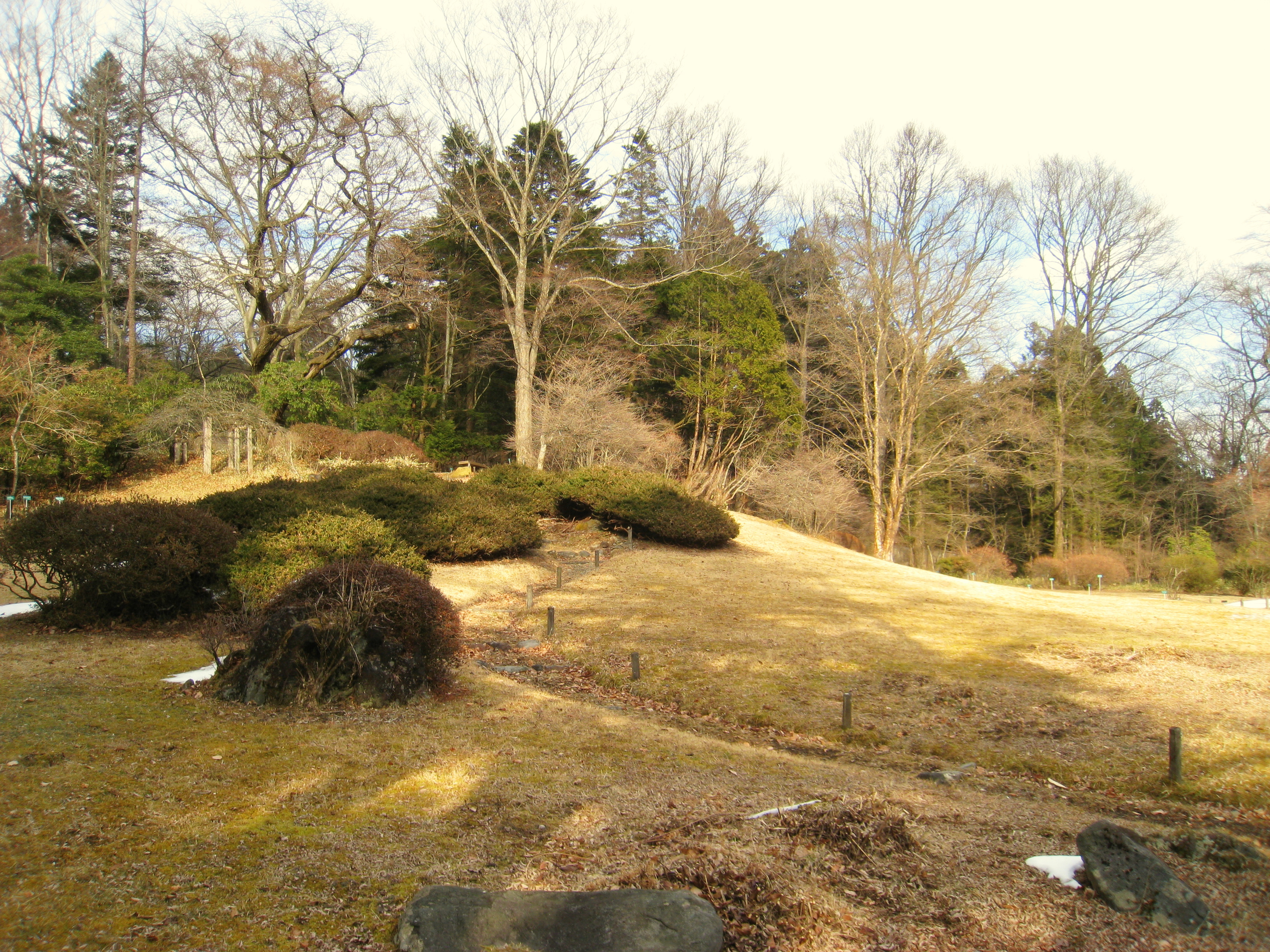
- Nikko Botanical Garden in winter

- Location within Japan
- Type: Botanical garden
- Location: 1842 Hanaishi, Nikkō, Tochigi, Japan
- Coordinates: 36°45′N 139°36′E
- Area: 26 acres (11 ha)
- Opened: 1902
- Website: https://www.bg.s.u-tokyo.ac.jp/nikko/eng/

The Nikko Botanical Garden (日光植物園, Nikkō Shokubutsuen) is a botanical garden operated by the Graduate School of Science, University of Tokyo, and located at 1842 Hanaishi, Nikkō, Tochigi, Japan, on rolling terrain with streams and ponds at 647 meters above sea level. It is open daily except Mondays during the warmer months; an admission fee is charged.

The garden was established in 1902 as a branch of the Koishikawa Botanical Garden, Tokyo, to specialize in the study of alpine plants. It was first located near Toshogu Shrine, but in 1911 moved to its current site, and in 1950 enlarged to include part of the Tamozawa Goyotei garden, a summer house of Japan's royal family.

Today the garden contains about 2,200 species (130 species of pteridophytes, 70 species of gymnosperms, and 2,000 species of angiosperms), with good collections of temperate trees and shrubs, including 22 of the 24 indigenous Japanese Acer species, more than 10 species of Japanese Prunus, and 80 rhododendron species. Many herbaceous species are grown beneath the trees, as well as more specialized collections in rockeries, bog gardens, and a fern garden (about 60 species). The rockeries contain about 100 species of Japanese alpine plants, together with plants from the Himalayas and Korea.

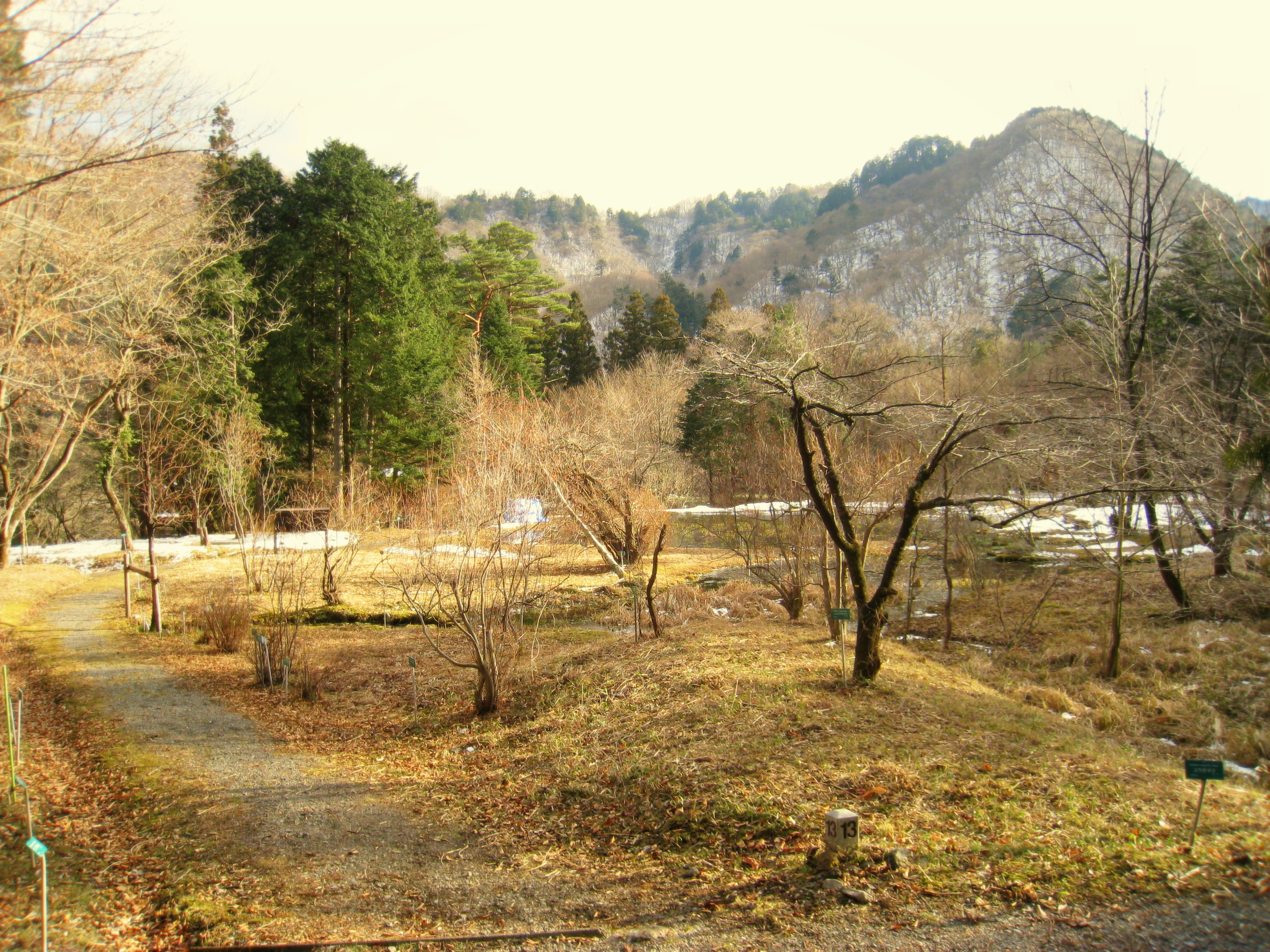

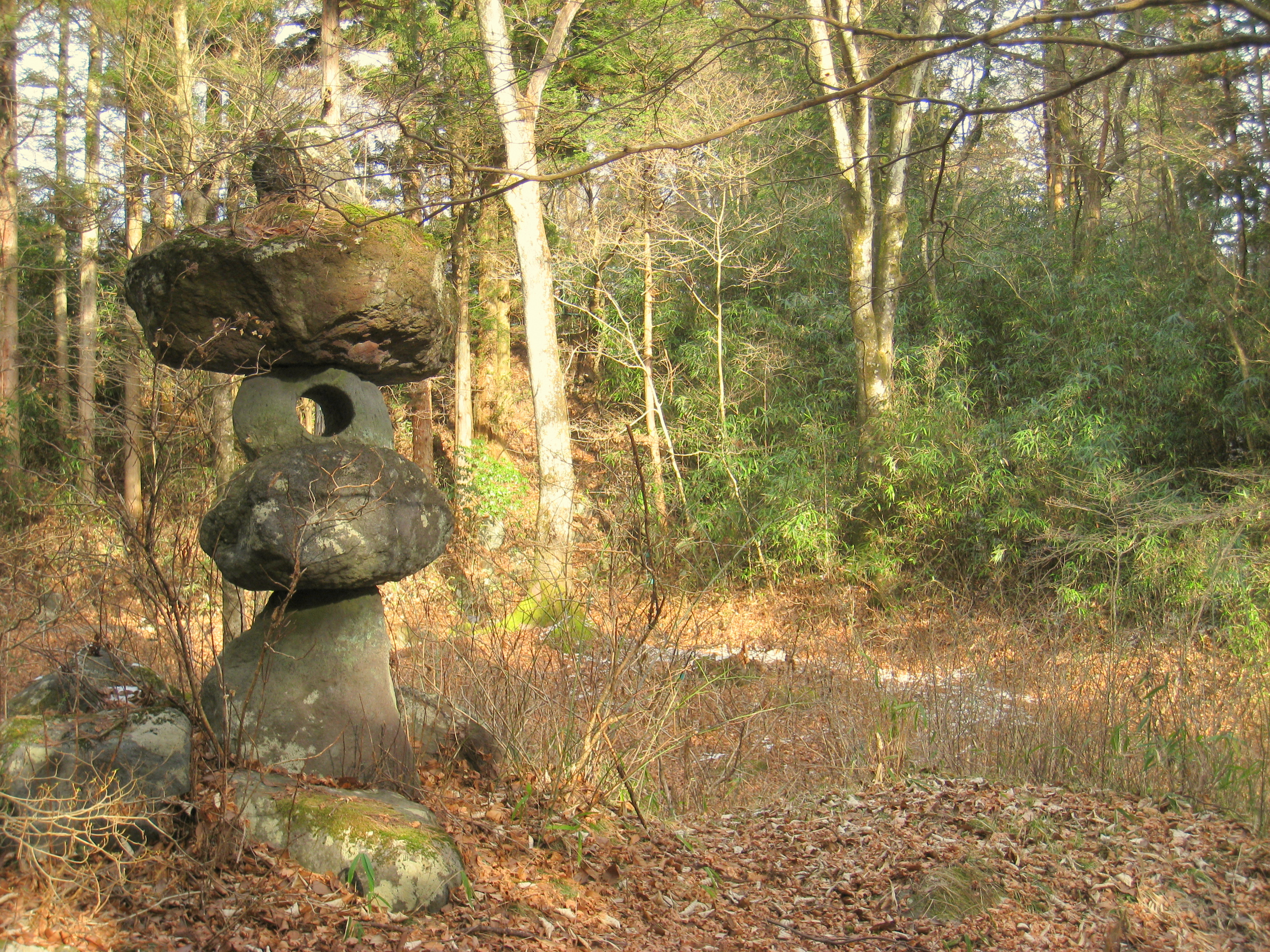

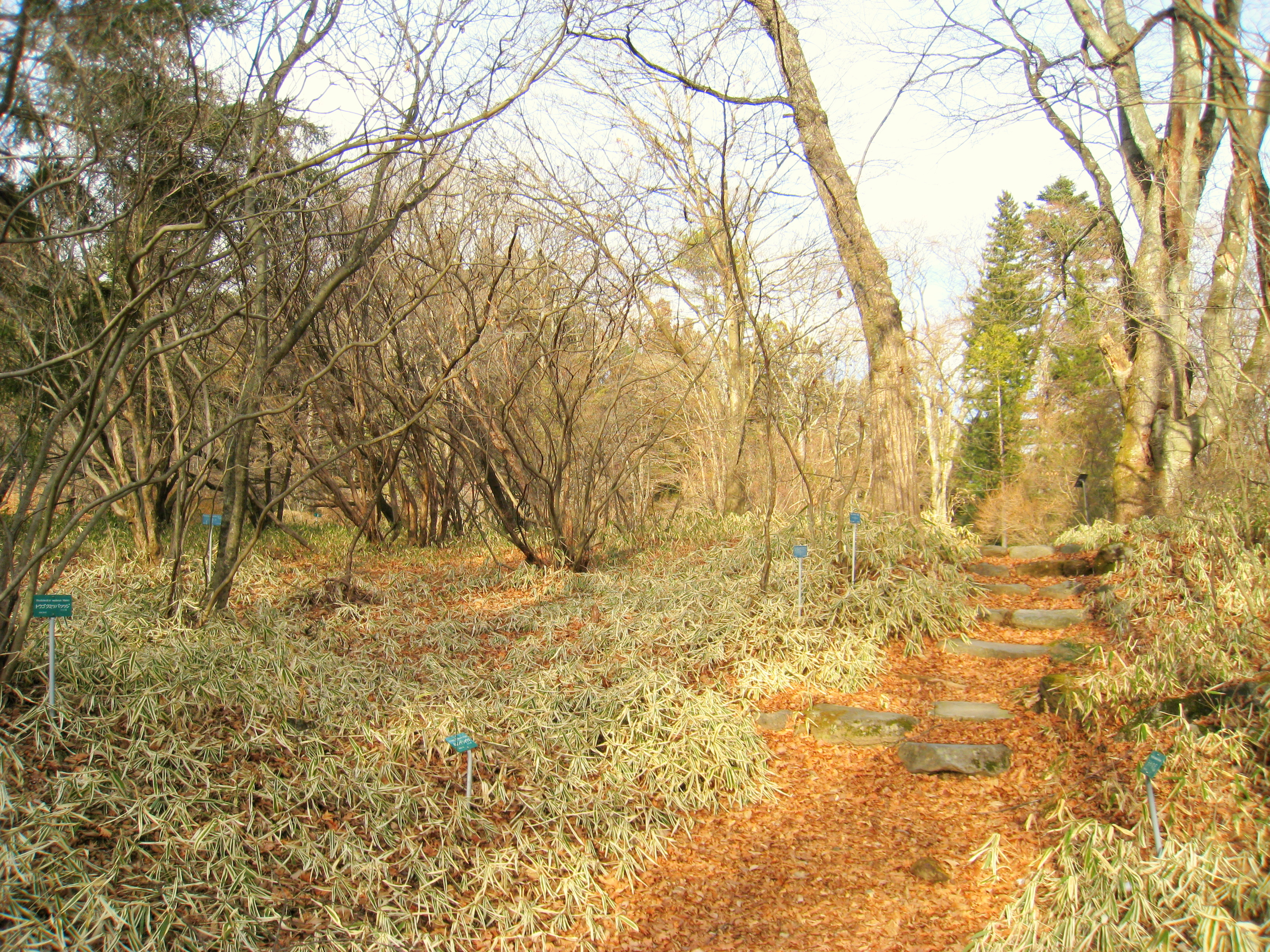

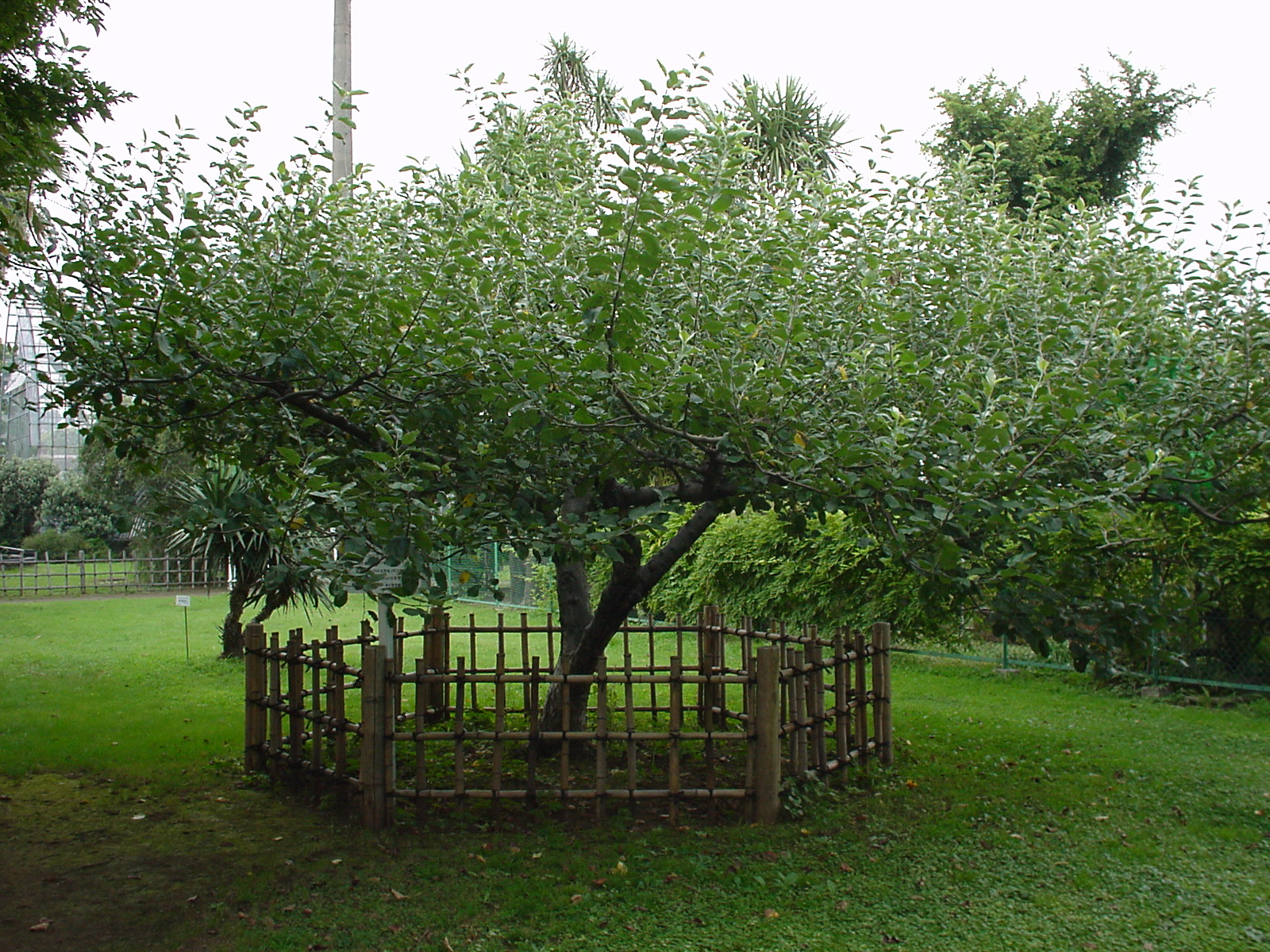

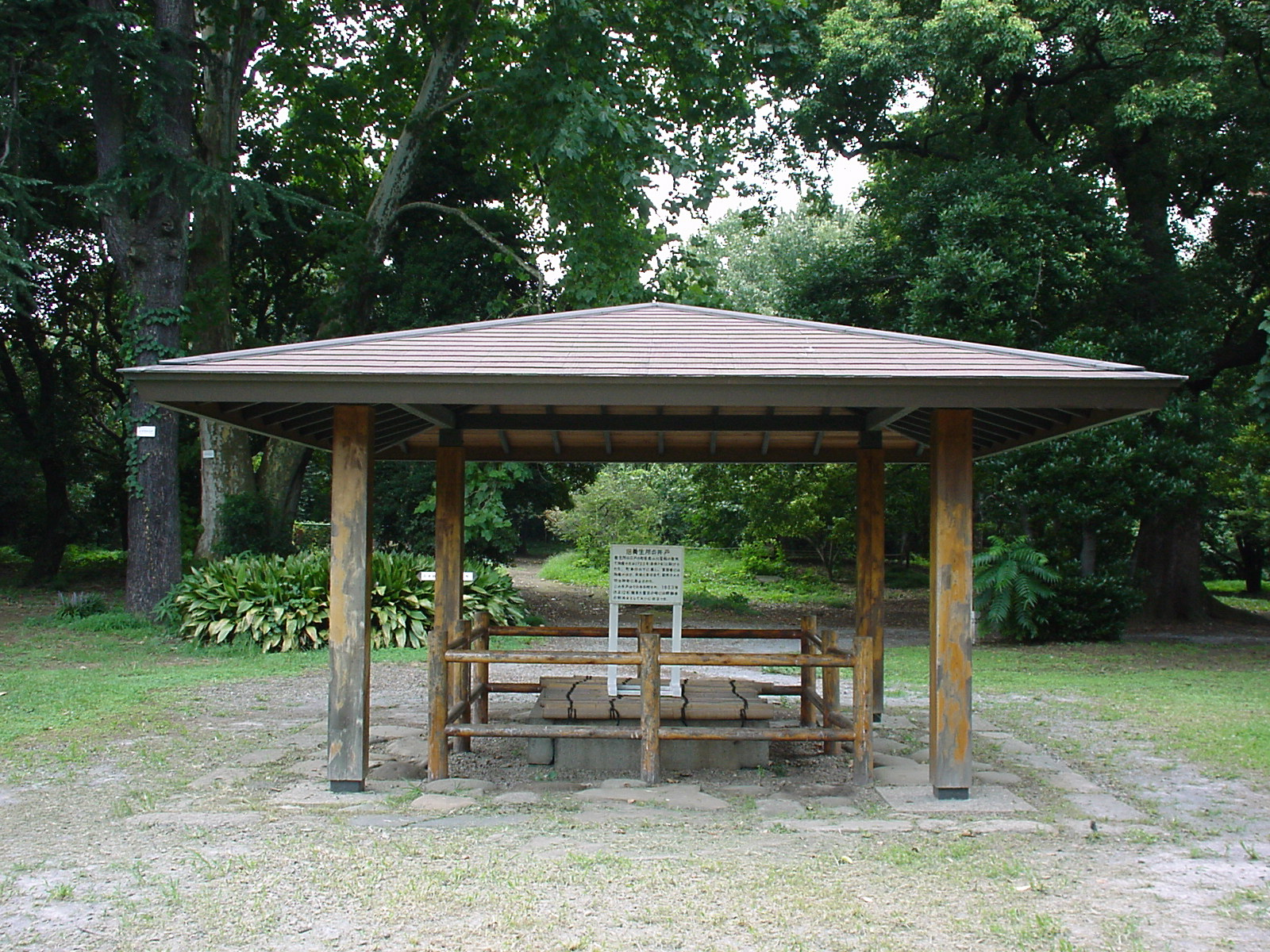

== See also ==
- List of botanical gardens in Japan

== References and external links ==
- Nikko Botanical Garden
- Nikko Tourist Association
