= Faculty of Letters, University of Tokyo =

One of the ten constituent undergraduate faculties of the University of Tokyo

Faculty of Letters Graduate School of Humanities and Sociology
- 東京大学文学部 人文社会系研究科
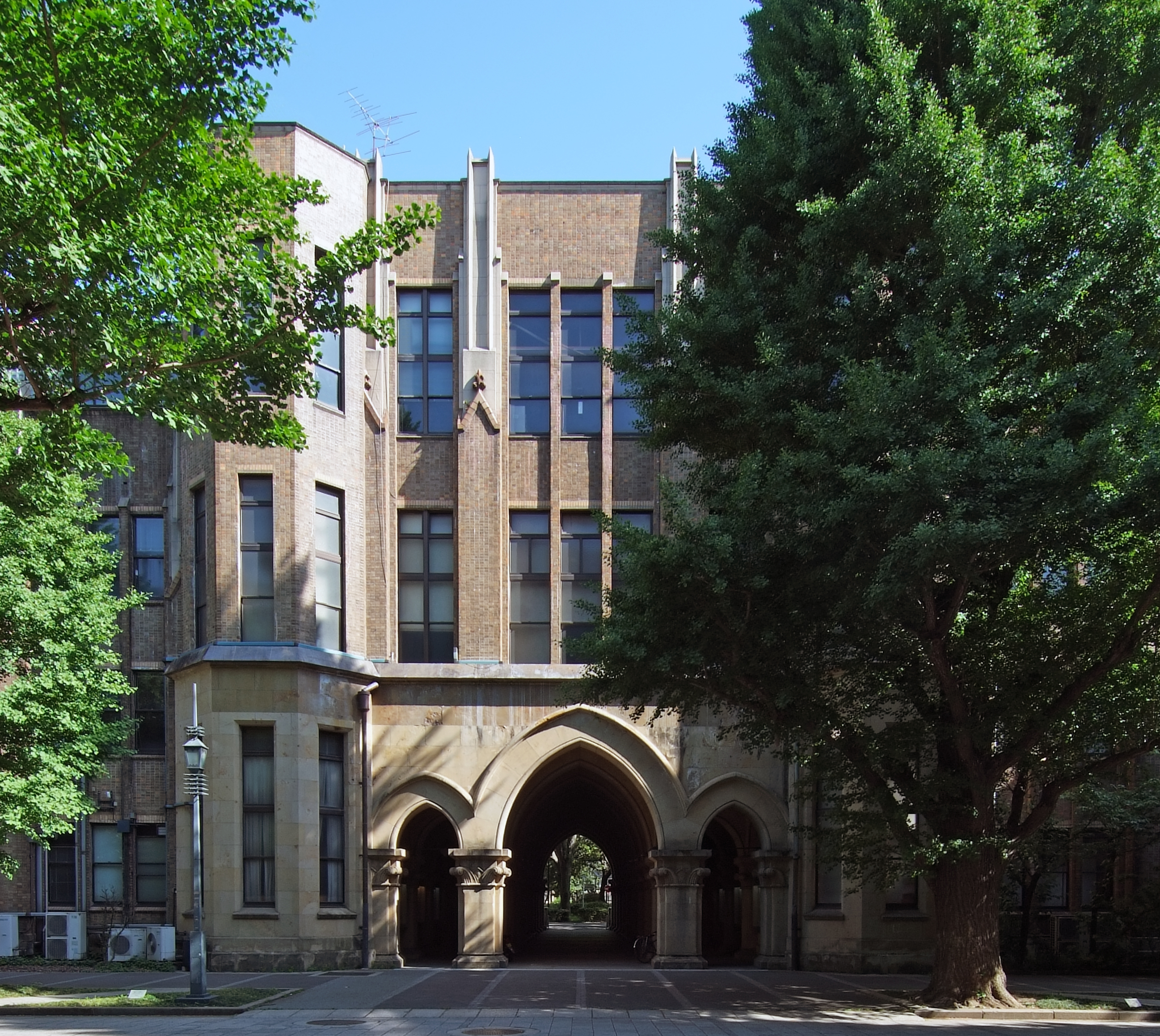
- Faculty of Law & Letters Building 1 in 2010
- Established: April 12, 1877
- Dean: Noburu Notomi (the 56th)
- Location: Tokyo, Japan
- Campus: Urban
- Website: https://www.l.u-tokyo.ac.jp/eng/index.html

The Faculty of Letters is one of the ten constituent undergraduate faculties of the University of Tokyo. The Graduate School of Humanities and Sociology is affiliated with the faculty, and these two schools operate as one organisation in practice.

== History ==
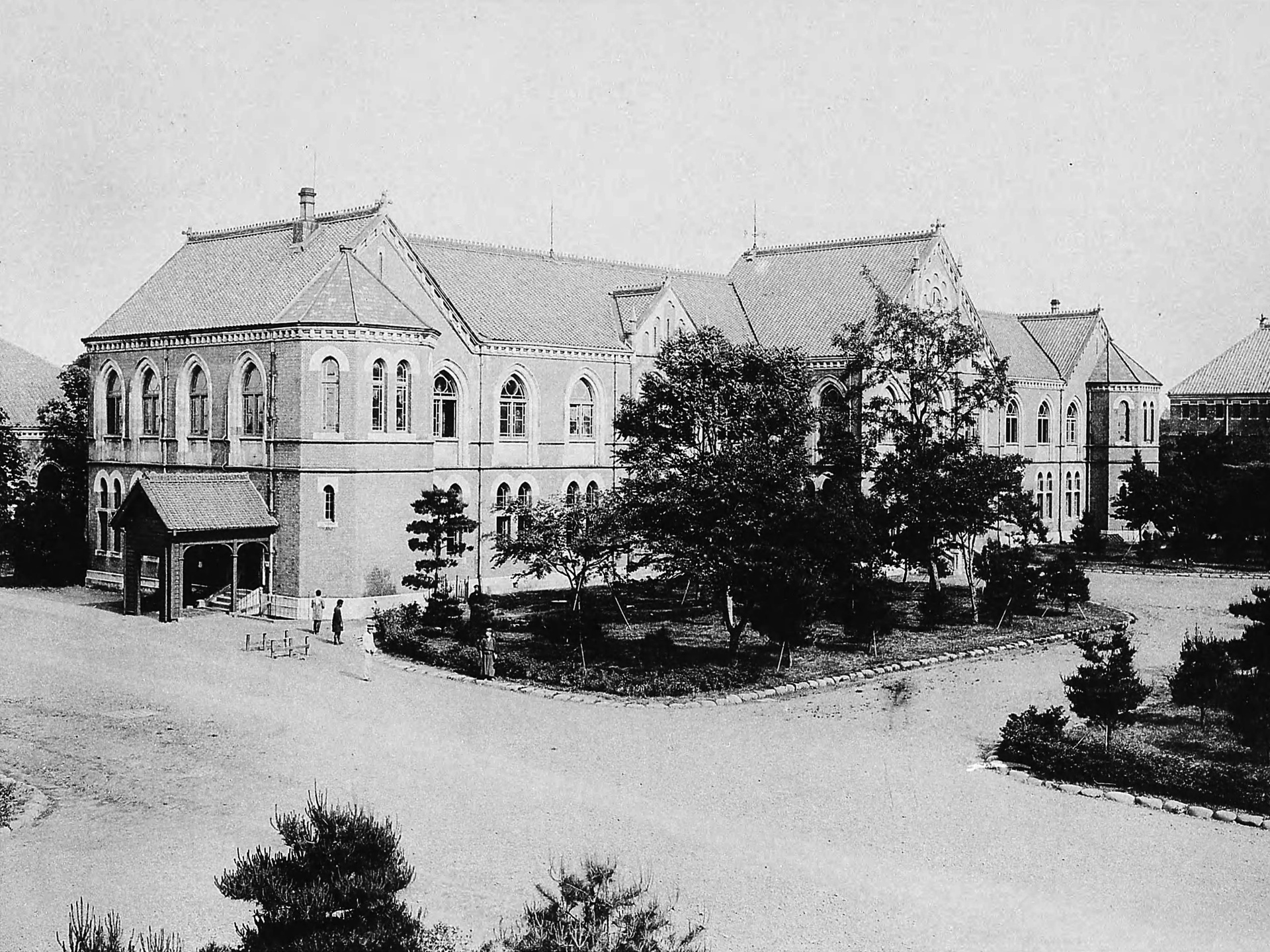
Faculty of Letters, c. 1900

The Faculty of Letters became part of the university when it was founded in 1877 through the merger of the Kaisei School and the Tokyo School of Medicine, the former of which included the Faculty. The Faculty traces its roots to the Bansho Shirabesho and the Shōhei-zaka Gakumonjo, both established during the Edo period.

In 1877, the Faculty comprised three departments: philosophy, politics, and Japanese and Chinese literature studies. The second of these was transferred to the Faculty of Law in 1885. Over time, these departments were gradually divided into more specialised groups, but the reorganisation of 1963 classified them into four categories: Cultural Studies, History, Linguistics, and Behavioural Studies. The Department of Education became an independent faculty in 1949 at the request of SCAP, which sought to utilise education as a means to further democratise Japanese society.

== Organisation ==
=== Undergraduate ===
- Department of Philosophy
- Department of Chinese Thought and Culture
- Department of Indian Philosophy and Buddhist Studies
- Department of Ethics
- Department of Religious Studies
- Department of Aesthetics
- Department of Islamic Studies
- Department of Japanese History
- Department of Oriental History
- Department of Occidental History
- Department of Archaeology
- Department of History of Art
- Department of Linguistics
- Department of Japanese Linguistics
- Department of Japanese Literature
- Department of Chinese Language and Literature
- Department of Indian Languages and Literatures
- Department of English Language and Literature
- Department of German Language and Literature
- Department of French Language and Literature
- Department of Slavic Languages and Literatures
- Department of South European Languages and Literatures Studies
- Department of Contemporary Literary Studies
- Department of Greek and Latin Classics
- Department of Psychology
- Department of Social Psychology
- Department of Sociology

== See also ==
- Bansho Shirabesho
- Yushima Seido
- University of Tokyo Library
