= Niko Heiskanen =

Finnish footballer (born 1989)

Personal information
- Full name: Niko Heiskanen
- Date of birth: 11 March 1989 (age 37)
- Place of birth: Oulu, Finland
- Height: 1.73 m (5 ft 8 in)
- Position: Defender

Team information
- Current team: TP-47
- Number: 2

Senior career*
Years	Team	Apps	(Gls)
2006–2009	AC Oulu	35	(1)
2006	→ Tervarit (loan)	-	(-)
2010	OPS	12	(0)
2011-	TP-47	41	(0)
- * Club domestic league appearances and goals as of 14 November 2012

Niko Heiskanen (born 11 March 1989) is a Finnish footballer.
