= Nagoya Castle =

Japanese castle in central Japan

- 名古屋城
- Nagoya, Japan

Site information
- Type: Flatland
- Owner: 1620–1870 (Owari Domain); 1872–1893 (government); 1893–1930 (Imperial family); 1930–present (City of Nagoya)
- Controlled by: Tokugawa
- Condition: Reconstructed 1957–1959, 2009–2018

Location
- Location within Nagoya Location within Aichi Prefecture Location within Japan
- Coordinates: 35°11′08″N 136°53′55″E

Site history
- Built: 1610–1619
- In use: 1620–1945
- Materials: Granite stone, earthwork, wood
- Demolished: 14 May 1945, in an air raid

Garrison information
- Occupants: Owari branch

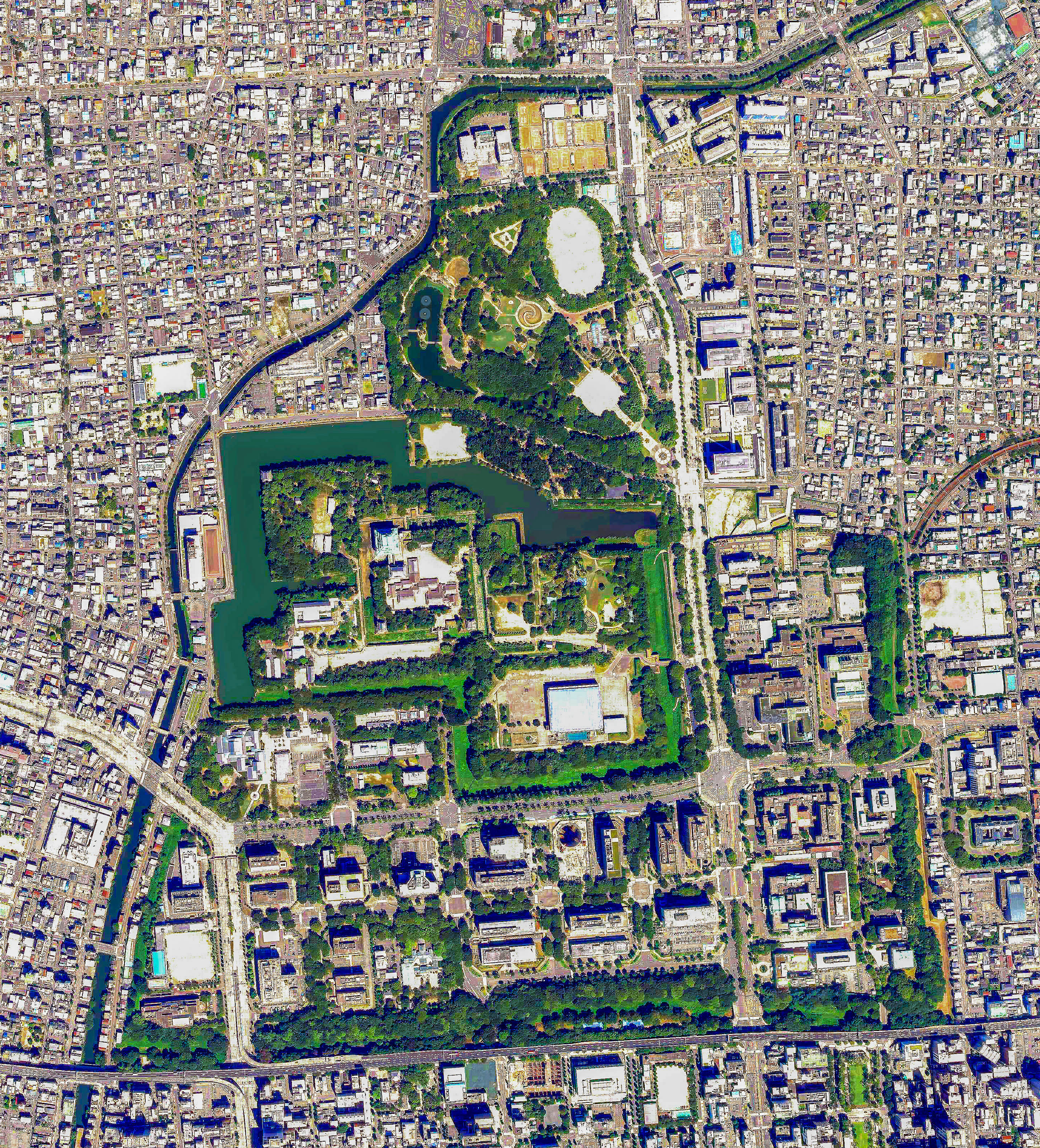
Aerial view of the grounds of Nagoya Castle (2020)

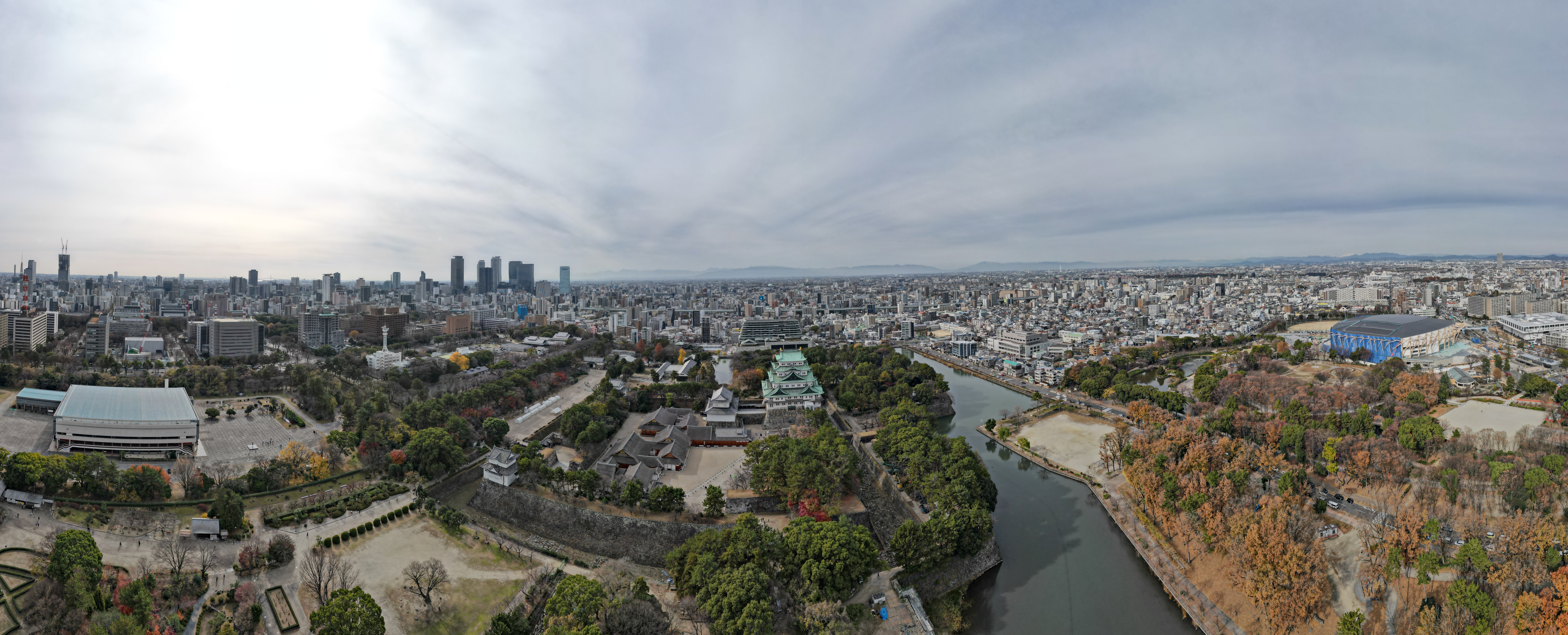
Nagoya Castle aerial panorama

Nagoya Castle (名古屋城, Nagoya-jō) is a Japanese castle located in Nagoya, Japan.

Nagoya Castle was constructed by the Owari Domain in 1612 during the Edo period on the site of an earlier castle of the Oda clan in the Sengoku period. Nagoya Castle was the heart of one of the most important castle towns in Japan, Nagoya-juku, a post station on the Minoji road linking two of the important Edo Five Routes, the Tōkaidō and the Nakasendō. Nagoya Castle became the core of the modern Nagoya and ownership was transferred to the city by the Imperial Household Ministry in 1930. Nagoya Castle was partially destroyed in 1945 during the bombing of Nagoya in World War II and the reconstruction and repair of the castle has been ongoing since 1957.

Meijō (名城), another shortform way of pronouncing Nagoya Castle (名古屋城), is used for many Nagoya city institutions such as Meijō Park, the Meijō Line of the Nagoya Municipal Subway, and Meijo University, reflecting the cultural influence of this historic structure. The castle has also historically been called Kinjō (金城), which means "Golden Castle", and Kinjo Gakuin University is named after it.

== History ==
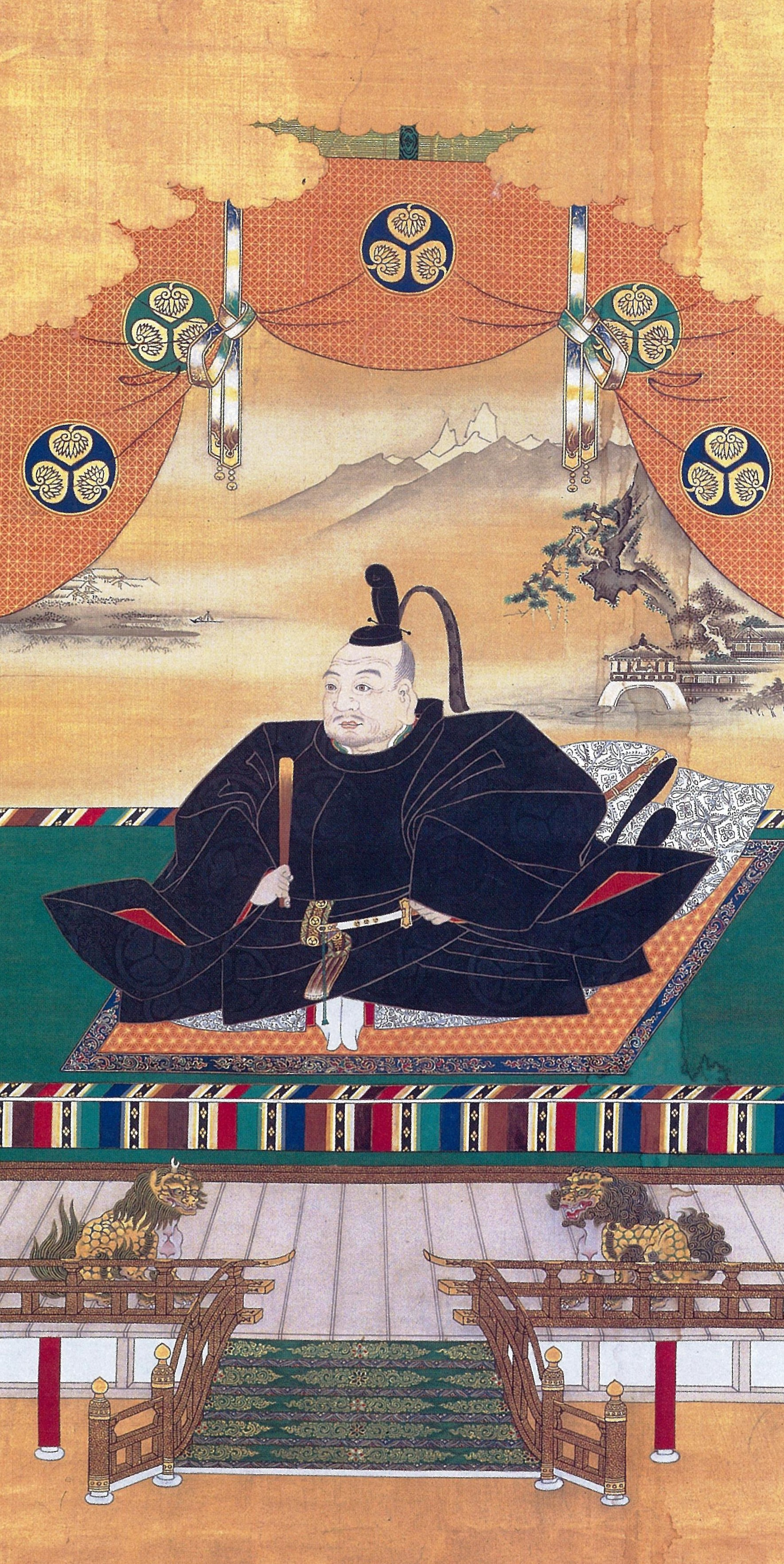
Tokugawa Ieyasu ordered the construction of the castle

In order to advance into Owari Province, the military governor of Suruga Province, Imagawa Ujichika, built Yanagi-no-maru, a precursor castle at Nagoya, between 1521 and 1528 during the Taiei era for his son, Imagawa Ujitoyo. It was located near the site of the later Ninomaru residence. Oda Nobuhide seized it from Imagawa Ujitoyo in March 1532 (Kyōroku 5), residing there and changing the name to Nagoya Castle. His son, Oda Nobunaga, was supposedly born there in 1534 (Tenbun 3), although this is subject to debate. After he defeated Oda Nobutomo at Kiyosu Castle in April 1555 (Kōji 1), he established his residence there. Around 1582 (Tenshō 10), the castle at Nagoya was abandoned.

After various upheavals in Japan, Tokugawa Ieyasu emerged victorious and decided in November 1609 (Keichō 14) to rebuild the castle at Nagoya. Up until the Meiji Restoration, Nagoya Castle flourished as the castle where the Owari branch, the foremost of the three Tokugawa clan lineages, resided. Castle construction technology had been extensively developed and consolidated since the construction of Azuchi Castle in 1576 by Oda Nobunaga (1534–1582). One of the main architects who designed and directed the building of the castle was Nakai Masakiyo, who was previously involved in the construction of the Nijō, Fushimi, Edo, and Sunpu castles. He had gathered and refined existing castle and fortification construction technology and techniques and ultimately formulated the standards for the Tokugawa shogunate's castles, as exemplified by Nagoya Castle.

=== Early restoration and expansion ===
In January 1610 (Keichō 15), the site was roped off and work began. Tokugawa Ieyasu ordered various daimyō to help with the construction of what was to become the new capital of the existing Owari Province. Katō Kiyomasa, Fukushima Masanori, and Maeda Toshimitsu were among the 20 feudal lords from the northern and western part of Japan who were assigned to assist in the project. The inscriptions of feudal lords and their vassals, carved on the stones they carried, are still visible today. In August 1610 the stone foundation of the main keep (tenshu) was completed, and by December construction of the stone walls for the Honmaru, Ninomaru, Nishinomaru, and Ofukemaru buildings was almost finished. In June 1611 (Keichō 16) a canal that today is the Hori River was built. The source for much of the building material for the new castle was the smaller Kiyosu Castle, including its tenshu, which was rebuilt as the northwest turret. In mid-1612 (Keichō 17), the construction of Honmaru Palace began, and the main keep was completed in December of that year.

Artists including Kanō Sadanobu painted the walls, ceilings, and sliding doors of Honmaru Palace in 1614 (Keichō 19). Construction of the gates and the Sannomaru moat were completed in July, and in November of that year the Shōgun Tokugawa Hidetada came for an inspection. Honmaru Palace was finished in February 1615 (Keichō 20) and Ninomaru Palace in 1617 (Genna 3). The Tōshō-gū shrine was established in the Sannomaru enceinte in 1619 (Genna 5), and the northwest turret, the former Kiyosu Tower of the Ofukemaru, was completed. In 1620 (Genna 6), Tokugawa Yoshinao (1601–1650) moved into Ninomaru Palace, where in 1627 (Kan'ei 4), a sanctuary was also constructed.

Overall renovation began on Honmaru Palace in May 1633 (Kan'ei 10) in preparation of the upcoming visit of Shōgun Tokugawa Iemitsu on his way to the imperial capital at Kyoto. Additional chambers, bathrooms, and halls, such as Jorakuden and Oyudonoshoin, were constructed. Kanō Tan'yū and other artists painted the walls, ceilings, and sliding doors in the new extensions in 1634 (Kan'ei 11). Work was completed in June, just in time for the shōgun's visit in July of that year.

For the next hundred years there was ongoing maintenance and renovation of the existing structures. In 1669 (Kanbun 9), repairs were made to the main keep walls and roofs. In November 1685 (Jōkyō 2), repairs were again made to the main keep roof; in March 1709 (Hōei 6) to the first and second stories of the main keep; in August 1720 (Kyōhō 5) to the chidorihafu gables on the third and fourth levels of the main keep; and in December 1726 (Kyōhō 11) to the third-level roofs, karahafu gables, the fourth-level roofs, and the copper tiles of the fifth-level roofs of the main keep. Repairs were also made to the golden shachi of the main keep, replacing their wooden core. Further work was carried out in August 1728 (Kyōhō 13) on the shingled roof of Honmaru Palace, remodeling it into a lightweight, informal roof. Repairs were made to the second-, third-, and fourth-level roofs of the main keep.

In November 1730 (Kyōhō 15), the golden shachi were recast for the first time and covered in wire mesh. In 1752 (Hōreki 2), the large-scale "Restoration of Hōreki" corrected the tilt of the keep, caused by unequal subsidence of its stone wall, and the roofs from the second level upward were tiled with copper. By 1788 (Tenmei 8), the accumulated debt of the Owari branch since 1767 (Meiwa 4) amounted to 215,000 ryō. As a result, the golden shachi had to be melted down and recast with less gold in 1827 (Bunsei 10). A finer wire mesh covered the shachi to hide the fact that they were less golden. In 1846 (Kōka 3), they were again melted down and recast for a third time.

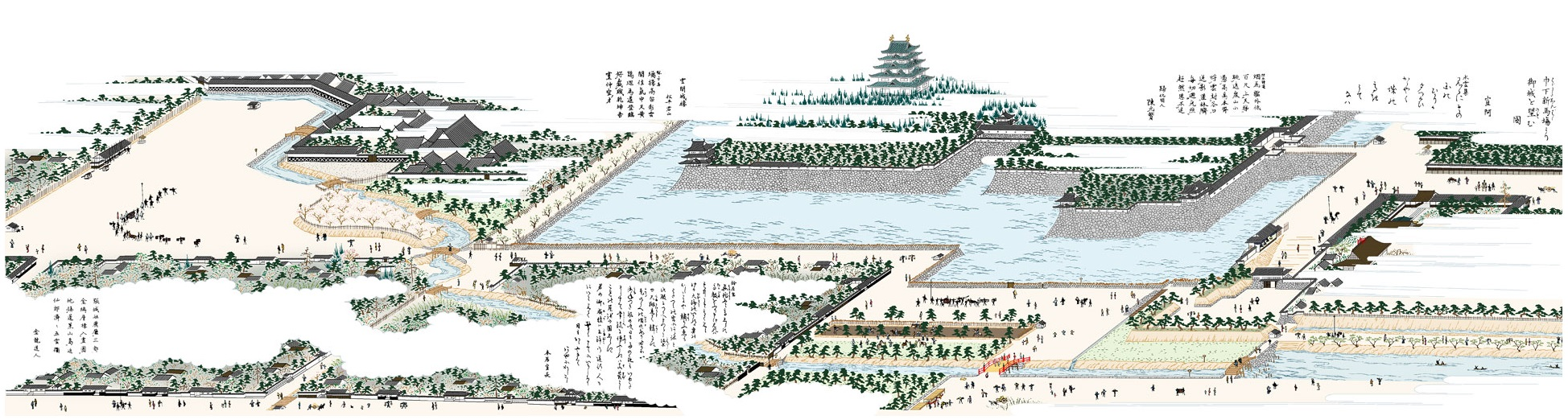
Print from the Owari meisho zue depicting Nagoya Castle in the late Edo period seen from the west. From right: Tōshō-gū, "cormorant's neck" moat, main keep, northwestern turret, and the New Palace (新御殿 Shin Goten) of Lord Tokugawa Naritomo what is today Horibata-chō (堀端町) on the left. The Hori river is running below.

The castle served as the political and administrative centre of the Owari Domain, where the lord of the Owari Tokugawa family governed the domain and maintained the principal domain offices. Its core spaces, such as the Ninomaru Palace, functioned as both the lord's residence and the supreme government office for domain administration. Administratively, governance was centralized around the domain office established within the castle grounds, where senior officials operated a structured bureaucratic apparatus to manage domain-wide taxation, justice, and military readiness. Surrounding this core, the San-no-maru enclosure accommodated high-ranking senior retainers and elder statesmen (karō).

Around the castle, a network of official residences, retainers' quarters, warehouses, and service districts formed the castle town, while additional estates such as the Aoi Oshitayashiki functioned as suburban villas, gardens, and auxiliary residences for the ruling family. In the castle town, samurai quarters, storehouses (kurayashiki), and economic distribution routes along the Hori River formed an integrated logistical web. This network tightly linked strict vertical samurai hierarchies with an overarching defensive and administrative urban design.

Beyond Nagoya, the Owari Domain maintained an extensive system of upper, middle, and lower residences (kamiyashiki, nakayashiki, shimoyashiki) within the domain and in Edo, which served as administrative headquarters during visits, residences for heirs and retired lords, storage facilities, and refuges in times of disaster. Collectively, these castle, urban, and suburban residences formed an integrated administrative and residential network linking Nagoya with Edo, allowing the Owari Tokugawa family to govern one of the largest domains in Tokugawa Japan while maintaining a continuous presence at both the domain capital and the shogunal capital.

=== 19th and 20th centuries ===
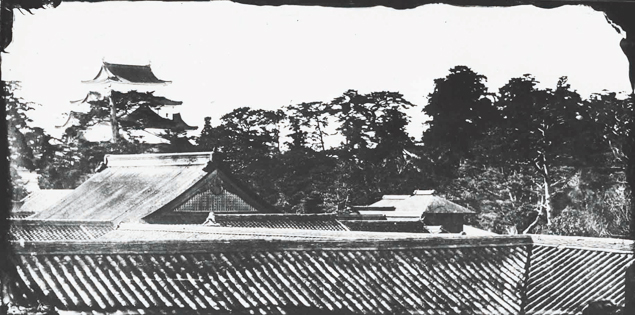
Ninomaru Palace with the main keep in the background, photograph taken in the 19th century

Law and order broke down as the Tokugawa Shogunate came to an end. The Aomatsuba Incident took place in February 1868 (Keiō 4) in the Ninomaru Palace, and a stone memorial stele was erected in the 1926. After the end of the Shogunate, the Owari branch decided to submit to the emperor. In 1870 (Meiji 3), Tokugawa Yoshikatsu had parts of the castle demolished and donated the golden shachi to the Imperial Household Department. They were removed from the main keep in April 1871 (Meiji 4), transported by steamship from Atsuta port to Tokyo, and were taken to numerous locations in Japan as a traveling exhibition. The male shachi was displayed at the Yushima Seido Exposition in 1872 and the female at the 1873 Vienna World Exposition.

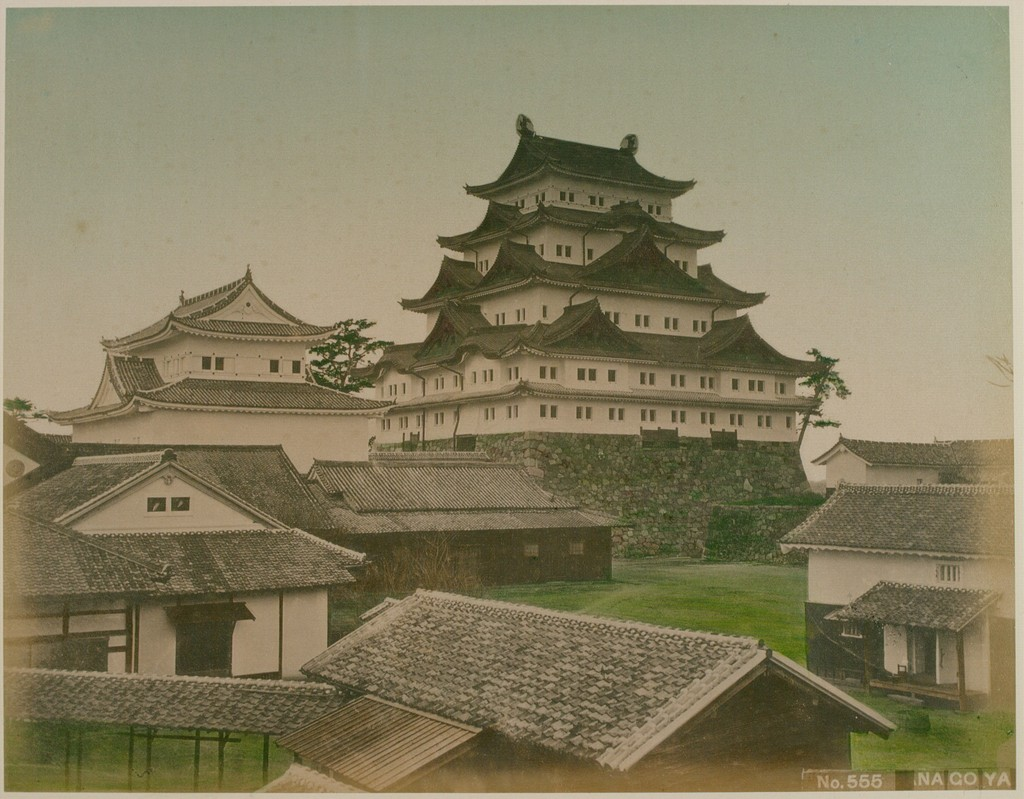
The two main keeps of the castle and surrounding Honmaru Palace structures, in a photograph taken c. 1880

In May 1872 the 3rd Division of the Tokyo Garrison was stationed at the castle and the Nagoya Detached Garrison and barracks were installed on the castle grounds. The demolition of the castle was put on hold after the German minister to Japan, Max von Brandt, spoke out against it. In December 1879 (Meiji 12), the imperial war minister Yamagata Aritomo decided to have the castle preserved on the advice of Colonel Nakamura Shigeto.

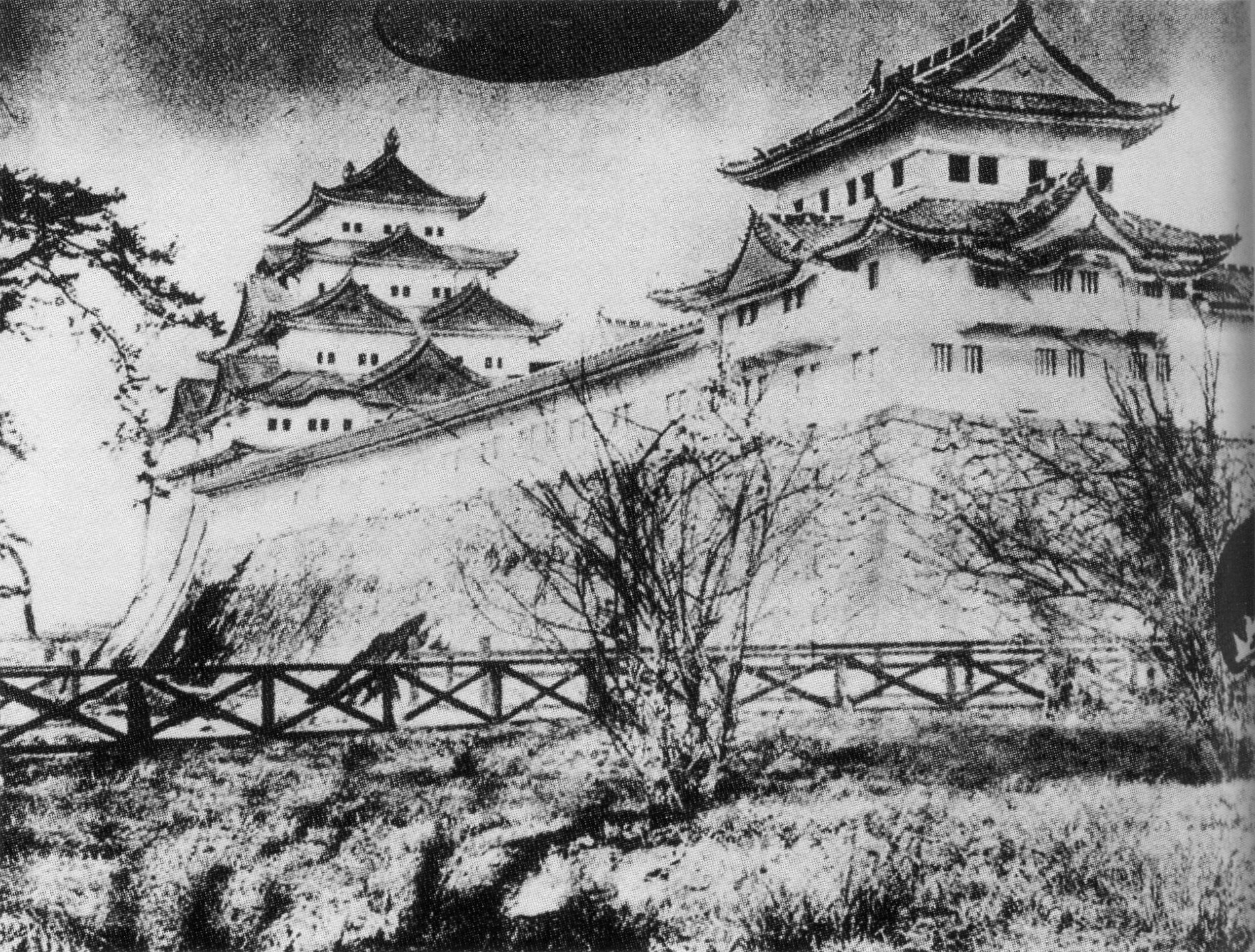
The southwestern turret and connecting gallery to the main keep before the 1891 earthquake

The 1891 Mino–Owari earthquake in October 1891 (Meiji 24) seriously damaged the southwest and Tamon turrets and other structures. Reconstruction and repair work followed, but not everything was rebuilt. In 1893 (Meiji 26), the castle was transferred to the Imperial Household Ministry and in June its name was changed to "Nagoya Detached Palace" or "Nagoya Imperial Villa" (名古屋離宮, Nagoya Rikyū) when the castle was designated as a formal imperial residence. On May 20, 1906 (Meiji 39), the grounds were opened to the public for one day for the National Railroad Five Thousand Miles Celebration. In March 1910 (Meiji 43), bronze shachi brought from Edo Castle were added to the roofs of the small keep and corner turrets. In February 1911 (Meiji 44), the former Hasuike Gate of Edo Castle was transported and reconstructed on the remains of the Nishinomaru-Enoki Gate, which today is used as the main visitors gate. In 1923 (Taishō 12), the southwest turret was repaired.

On December 11, 1930 (Shōwa 5), ownership of the castle was transferred from the Imperial Household Ministry to the City of Nagoya, thus abolishing its status as an imperial villa. In the same month, 24 structures on the castle grounds were designated as national treasures. On February 11, 1931 (Shōwa 6), the grounds were opened to the general public. The next decade saw conservation and archaeological activities and the castle was scientifically documented. In May 1932 (Shōwa 7), a field survey and measurement of the castle were carried out. In July of that year, the old Kayanoki (Japanese nutmeg) tree in the Nishinomaru was designated as a national monument. In December the castle was designated a historical site. In 1936 (Shōwa 11), the Sarumen Tea House (猿面) in the Ninomaru was designated as a national treasure. In June 1942 (Shōwa 17), some of the Honmaru Palace paintings were designated as national treasures. Most of the sliding doors and paintings were put into storage as World War II threatened the Japanese mainland.

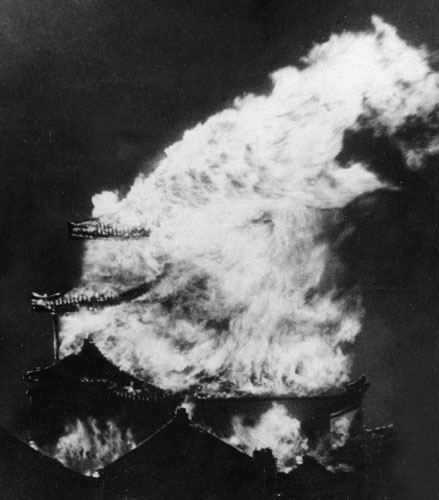
World War II bombing by the U.S. Army Air Forces destroyed Nagoya Castle in 1945

During World War II, the castle was used as the Tokai district army headquarters and the administration office of the Nagoya POW camp. The aerial bombardments of Nagoya by the United States Army Air Forces as part of the air raids on Japan brought the most destruction to the castle in its entire history. In January 1945 (Shōwa 20), the Sarumen Tea House was destroyed in air raids. On May 14, the main keep, small keep, golden shachi, Honmaru Palace, northeast turret, and other buildings were completely destroyed in air raids. In June of that year, some of the paintings saved from Honmaru Palace were moved for safekeeping to the Haiho Shrine, Toyota-shi. They returned in May 1946 (Shōwa 21).

The castle's surviving former national treasures, which included the southwest, southeast, and northwest turrets, the Omote-Ninomon Gate, and some of the Honmaru Palace paintings were redesignated as Important Cultural Assets by the national government. In 1953 the southeast turret was dismantled for repairs. The Ninomaru Garden was designated a place of scenic beauty. In June 1955 (Shōwa 30), most of the Honmaru Palace paintings—and exactly a year later, the ceiling panel paintings—were designated national important culture assets. In 1957 (Shōwa 32), reconstruction of the castle keeps was started. Second-generation golden shachi were cast in the Osaka Mint and transported to the castle. On October 3, 1959, reconstruction of the two keeps was completed, and the buildings were opened to the public. The next few decades saw further renovation work. In March 1964 (Shōwa 39), the northwest turret was dismantled for repairs. In 1967 (Shōwa 42), the Ninomon of the western iron gate was dismantled for repairs. In 1972 (Shōwa 47), the stone walls at the west side of the East Iron Gate of the Ninomaru were dismantled. The wooden Ninomon was dismantled and later rebuilt at the east Ninomon Gate of the Honmaru.

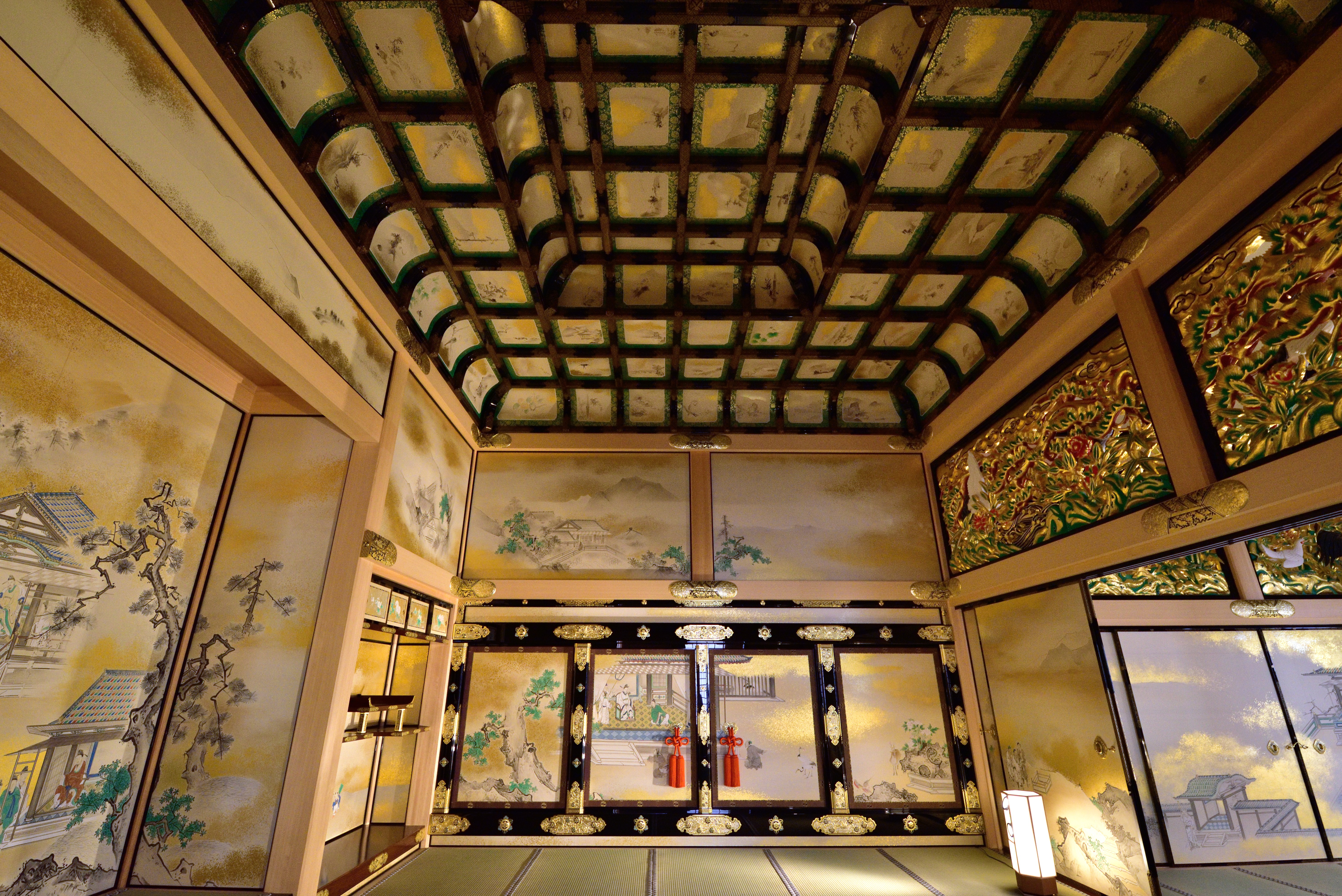
Restored Jōdan-no-ma (上段之間) in the Jōraku-den (上洛殿) of the Honmaru Palace (2018)

=== 21st century and future plans ===
In preparation for Expo 2005, English-language plaques were added to most displays, and a 3D movie showing the paintings in Honmaru Palace (本丸御殿, Honmaru Goten) was created for the anticipated large number of visitors. Reconstruction work of the destroyed Honmaru Palace began in 2009 and was completed by 2018. Nagoya mayor Takashi Kawamura announced plans in 2009 to completely reconstruct in wood the main towers that were destroyed during World War II, just as in the original structure. The budget to reconstruct the main towers was estimated at billions of yen. After negotiations with the national authorities, the plan was approved and in July 2017 the city officially launched the fundraising campaign. The platform for international online donations opened in 2020. The goal was to reconstruct the main tower by 2022. Collection of necessary hinoki timber started in the forests of Gifu prefecture in 2019.

The city has plans to further restore Honmaru and Ninomaru structures where photographic evidence and architectural drawings exist such as various turrets, gates and defensive walls. This would also entail moving out existing modern structures on the grounds.

== Layout ==
The castle complex is made up of five enceintes divided by an outer (Soto-bori) and inner moat (Uchi-bori). Each enceinte is protected by walls with turrets strategically located at each corner. Access from one enceinte to the next was controlled by guarded gates that were accessible by bridges. The castle is a good example of the type built on flat land.

The Honmaru enceinte is in the centre of the complex, containing the main and minor keep, along with the palace. The Ninomaru enceinte is located to the east, the Nishinomaru to the west, the Ofukemaru, also known as the Fukaimaru, to the northwest, and the Sannomaru around the east and south. To the north was the Ofuke-niwa (御深井庭) or Ofuke-oniwa (御深井御庭). The Ofuke Garden was a pleasure garden centering on a large pond that was left over from the low marshland that existed on the north side of the castle when the castle was built, and served as a defense. The pond had a number of small islands and the area was cultivated as a Japanese garden. This part became the public Meijō Park in 1931. Located west of the Ofuke Garden was lord Tokugawa Naritomo's Shin Goten (新御殿 New Palace) in what is today Horibata-chō (堀端町).

The larger Sannomaru enceinte used to be buffered by two moats and encircled the inner castle enceintes from the east and the south. Various temples and villas, as well as administrative buildings, were located on its grounds. On the eastern side, the large stone foundations of the Sannomaru East Gate are still visible. Located in the Sannomaru enceinte were the Tōshō-gū shrine and the Tennosha shrine, which housed the guardian deity of the castle. Both shrines played an important role in the religious life of the castle, and rituals and festivals were held in honour of the spirits enshrined. Both shrines were moved in the late 19th century during the Meiji era. None of the other original wooden structures of the Sannomaru have survived, but the area is still the administrative center of the city of Nagoya and the surrounding Aichi Prefecture, with Nagoya City Hall, the Aichi Prefectural Government Office, and other administrative buildings and offices being located there. Roads and areas such as Sotobori-dori (Outer Moat Road) and Marunouchi begin at the castle.

=== Corner turrets ===
These turrets were used as a storage area for weapons and armour in times of peace, and served as an encampment from which to mount attacks in an emergency. Because they were erected on the corners of enclosures within the castle grounds making for strategic watchtowers, they are often called corner turrets.

The castle had originally at least 11 corner turrets. The southeast, southwest and northwest corner turrets are the three which remain in the Honmaru, and have been designated by the national government originally as National Treasures, later as Important Cultural Properties.

These are long, narrow slits with coverings opened in the floor. The holes were colloquially called "rock chutes" but they were not used simply for dropping stones and other objects. The chutes were brilliantly designed so that guns could be fired downwardly over a wider area. They are made so that those looking from outside cannot immediately recognize where the chutes are located. The southeast and southwest corner turrets located at the Hommaru are installed the second floor bay window.

Architecturally there are two roofs making the turret look as if they have two stories, but in reality there are three floors (二重三階 "nijyu-sankai"). The first and second floor aspects are the same size. Also the third floor aspect is smaller than the first and second one by two ken (3.6 meters) on a side. The northeast corner turret that burned down during World War II had a similar structure except for the difference in the design of the projecting bay windows (出窓 "de-mado").

== Nishinomaru ==
=== Nishinomaru Enokida Gate ===
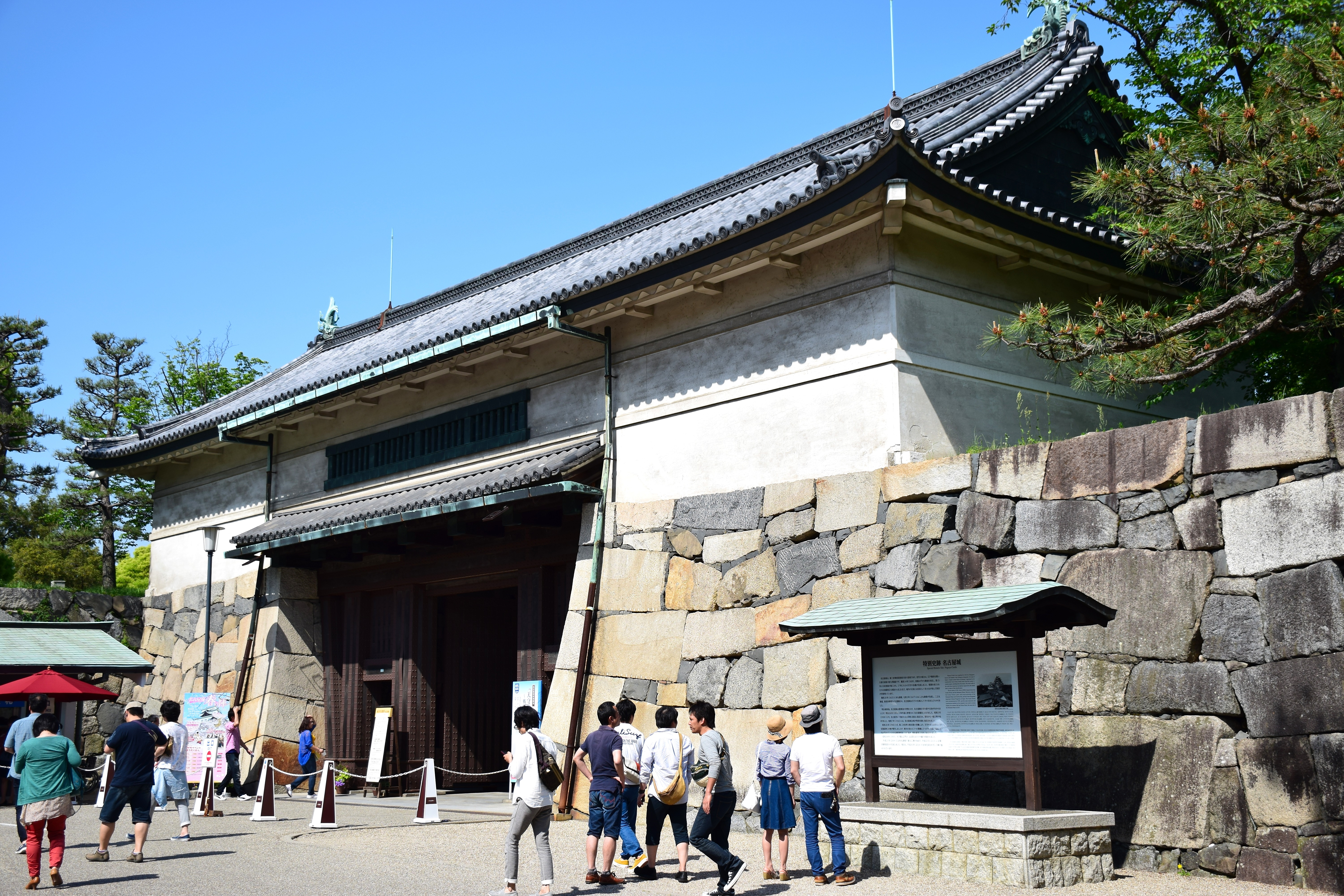
Nishinomaru Enokida Gate, today used as the main gate

The Nishinomaru Enokida Gate (西之丸 榎多門 Nishinomaru enokidamon) is used today as the main entrance (正門 seimon) to the castle. The original structure was built as a tower gate (yagura mon). A smaller front gate to the south was called Kabuki Gate (冠木門 Kabukimon) and a rectangular-shaped barbican tower was built on top of the surrounding stone walls. Together the structures formed a square called Masugata Koguchi (桝形虎口) where the enemy could be encircled. The gate formed an important part of the castle's defenses, being the main portal into the western Nishinomaru (西之丸) enceinte.

It sustained major damage in the 1891 Mino–Owari earthquake and the Hasuike Gate (蓮池門 Hasuikemon) dating from Genroku 17 (1704) was relocated here from the former Edo Castle in Tokyo in 1911 as a replacement. This gate however completely burnt down in an air raid in 1945 and was reconstructed with reinforced concrete in 1959.

=== Kaya tree ===
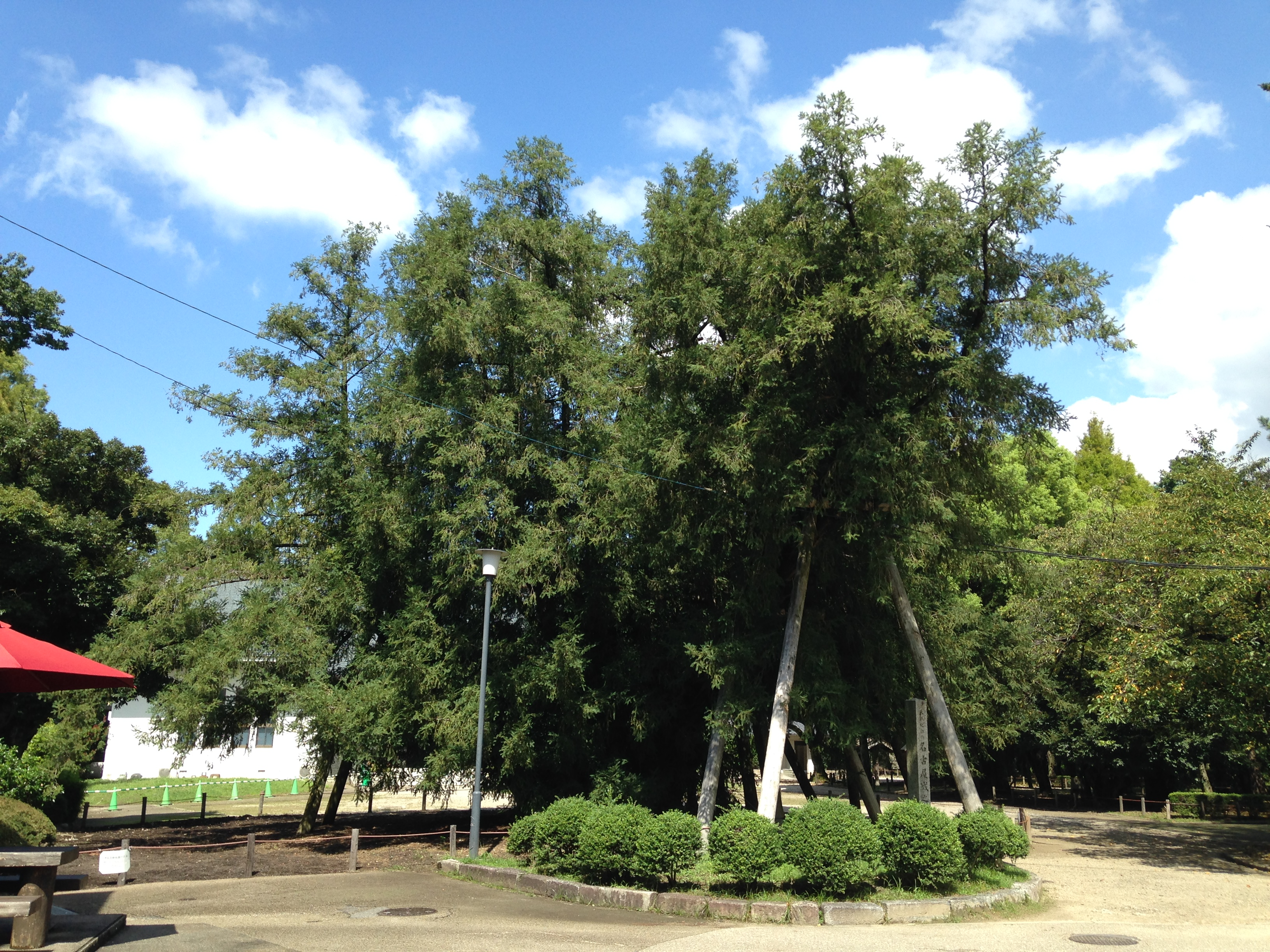
The old Kaya tree predates the castle

An old Kaya (Torreya nucifera) tree is located close to the Nishinomaru-enokida Gate to the north. Its height is 16 metres and it is eight metres at the base. Over 600 years old, the tree was already there when the castle was constructed. It is the only government-designated natural monument in Nagoya. The tree regained its viability despite damage from air raids in 1945. Tokugawa Yoshinao, the first feudal lord of Owari, and thus the castle, is said to have decorated his dinner tray with torreya nuts from this tree before going into battle in Osaka, and later for New Year's celebrations.

=== Warehouses ===
Located behind the Kaya tree is the former site of the warehouses and rice granaries (米倉 komegura). These were six long-shaped buildings running parallel to the Cormorant's Neck moat. After World War II, the Nishinomaru Exhibit Hall was located here and was replaced with two buildings that were rebuilt in the appearance of the former warehouses to house the new exhibition space. The new Nishinomaru Okura Museum (西の丸御蔵城宝館 Nishinomaru Okura Jōhōkan Nishinomaru Warehouses Castle Treasure Hall) is located where the third and fourth warehouses were and was opened on November 1, 2021 and exhibits important cultural properties such as the fusuma paintings of the Honmaru Palace. It also showcases the history and persons of the castle. Further excavations will be carried out in the future to reveal and clarify the original layout of the storehouses.

=== Ote Umadashi ===
The Ote Umadashi was once a small defensive wall in front of the Second Front Gate on the front side of the castle wall. A moat once served to protect this point and the Nishinomaru, but it was filled in when the area was turned into an imperial detached palace from 1893 to 1930 because it disrupted the flow of carriage traffic.

== Honmaru ==
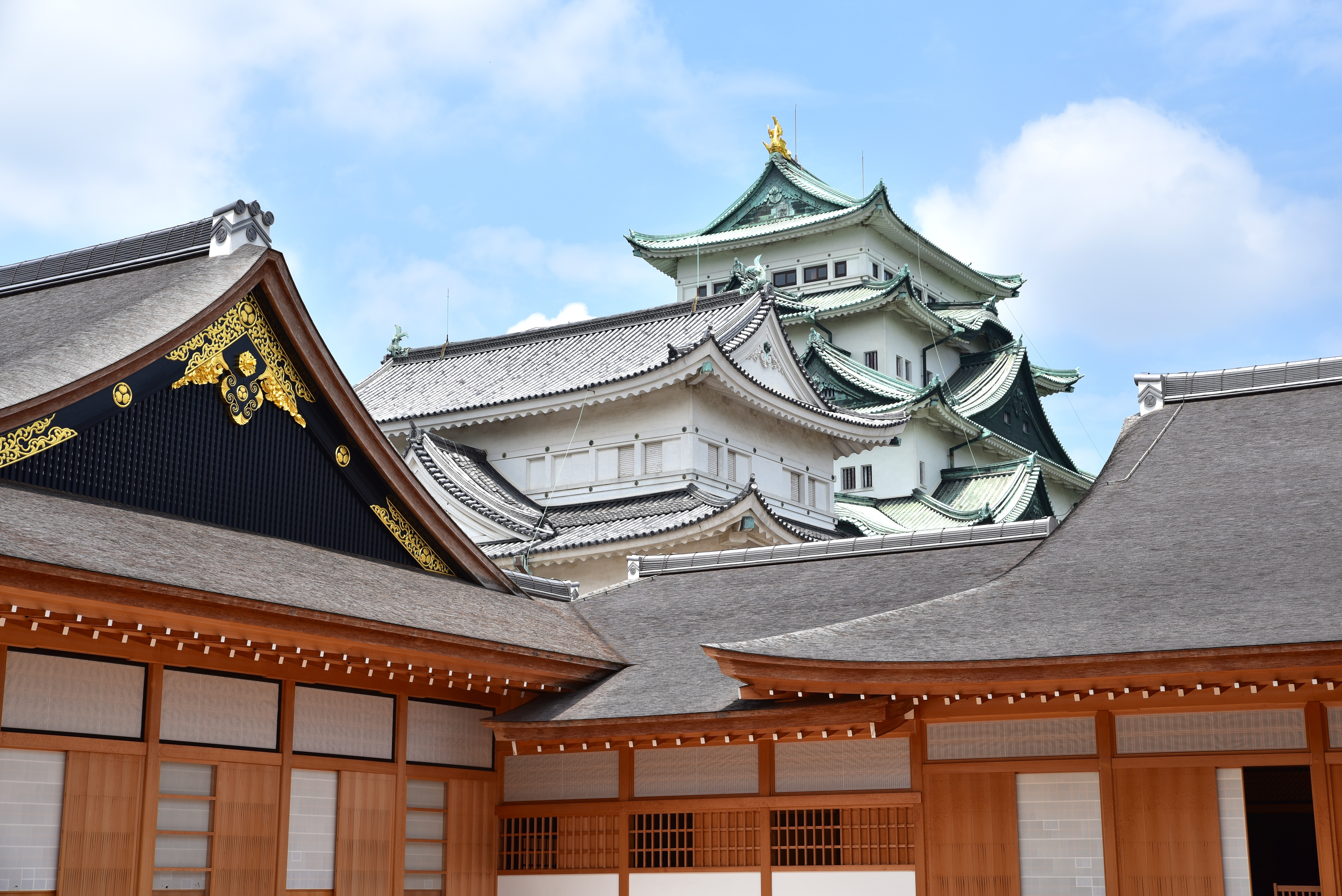
Honmaru palace and main keep

The Honmaru is the central enceinte. It encompasses the primary residential palace of the Owari lords and the two main towers and is encompassed by turrets and gates. Registered by the government as a National Treasure, it was destroyed during aerial bombardments of World War II. It was rebuilt using original methods and materials and reopened to the public in 2018.

The fusuma were from the Kanō school and along with the ceiling panels survived the war as they were in storage. Based on the originals and detailed photographs and plans, reproductions were made using the same techniques and materials from that time under the supervision of Nihonga painter Katō Junko (painter) (加藤純子).

Initially used as the primary residence of the Owari lords, it was later converted to a guesthouse and administrative office when the court moved to the Ninomaru. The palace has over 30 rooms and covers an area of 3,100 square metres. The architecture is in the formal shoin-zukuri style.

The palace is divided into various areas:

- Omote Shoin (表書院 Main Hall)
- Taimenjo (対面所 Reception Hall)
- Jorakuden (上洛殿 Shogun Accommodation Facilities)
- Kuroki Shoin (黒木書院 Inner Reception Hall)
- Oyudono Shoin (湯殿書院 Bathing Room)

While the majority of the palace's halls and rooms are a museum, some rooms with no decorations, such as the Peacock Room, can be used for seminars and events.

=== Southwest turret ===
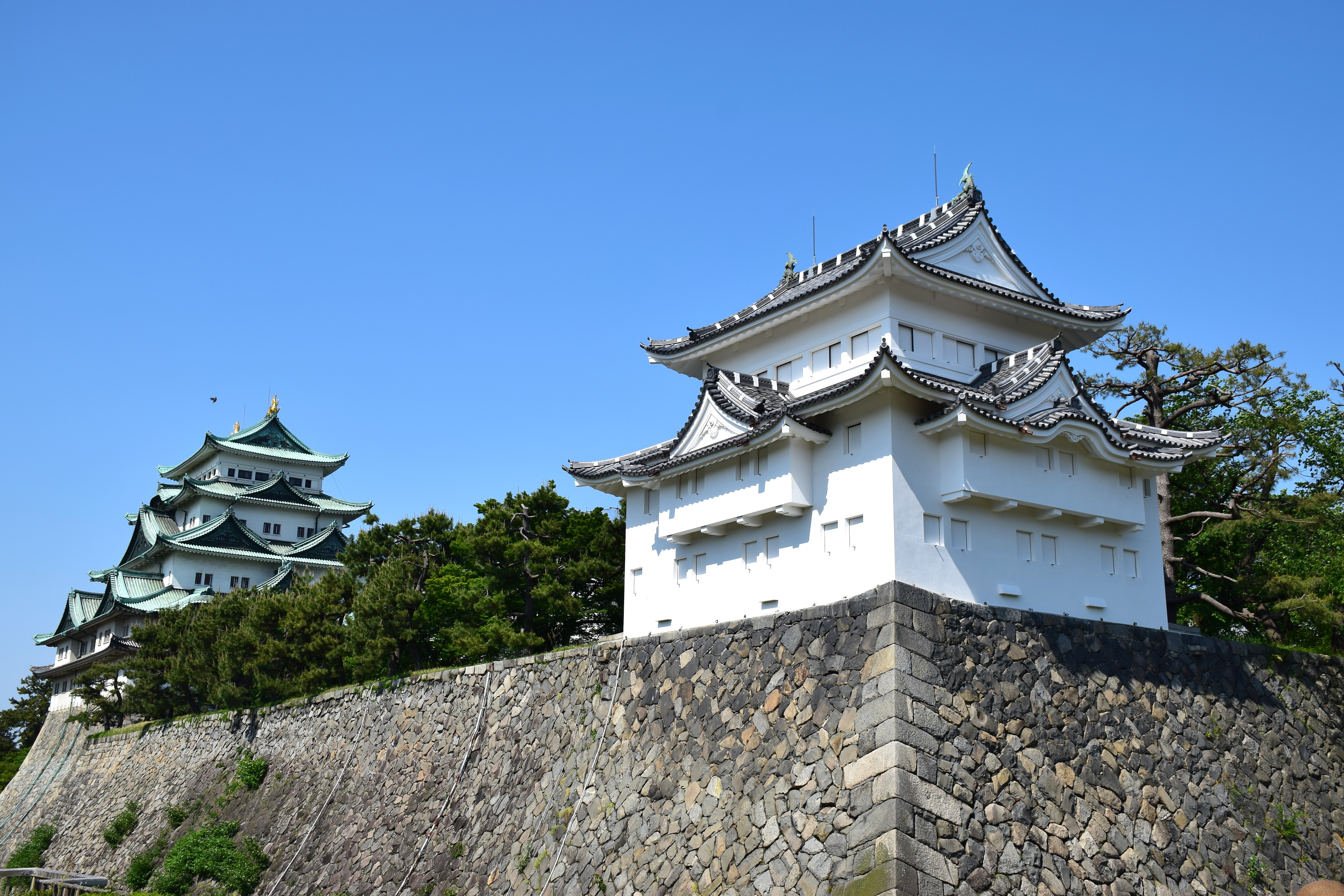
Southwest turret

The southwest turret (南西隅櫓 Seinan-sumi Yagura) is also called the Hitsuji-saru (未申 goat-monkey) turret because these two animals denoted the direction of the earthly branches. It is three stories tall with a two-level roof. On the west and south sides, trap doors project below the lower-level roof, which were designed for dropping stones on attackers in defense of the castle. The symbol of the chrysanthemum, the Imperial Seal of Japan, can be seen on the ridge-end tiles.

This tower and its stone wall were damaged during the great Nobi earthquake in 1891 and repaired in 1923 under orders of the Imperial Household Ministry. It is designated an Important Cultural Asset.

=== Southeast turret ===
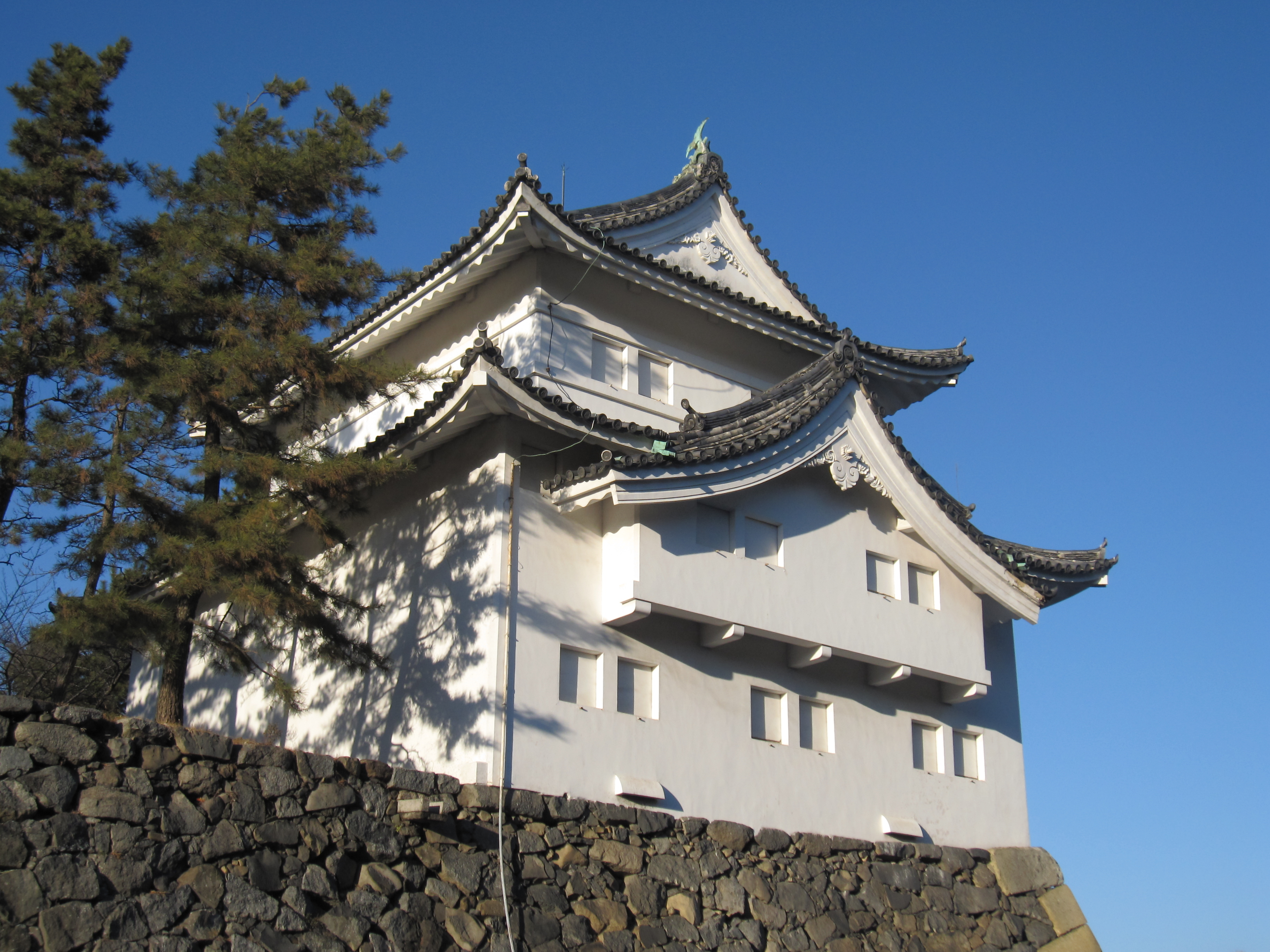
Southeast turret

Called the Tatsumi turret, the southeast turret (東南隅櫓 Tōnan-sumi Yagura) looks like it has two stories, but it actually has three. The white coating on the mud walls made the structure both waterproof and fireproof. The southeast turret is similar to the southwest turret. The construction adheres to the original Tokugawa design. The symbol of a hollyhock, the crest of the Tokugawa clan, can be seen on the ridge-end tiles. The turret has been designated an Important Cultural Asset.

=== South gate ===
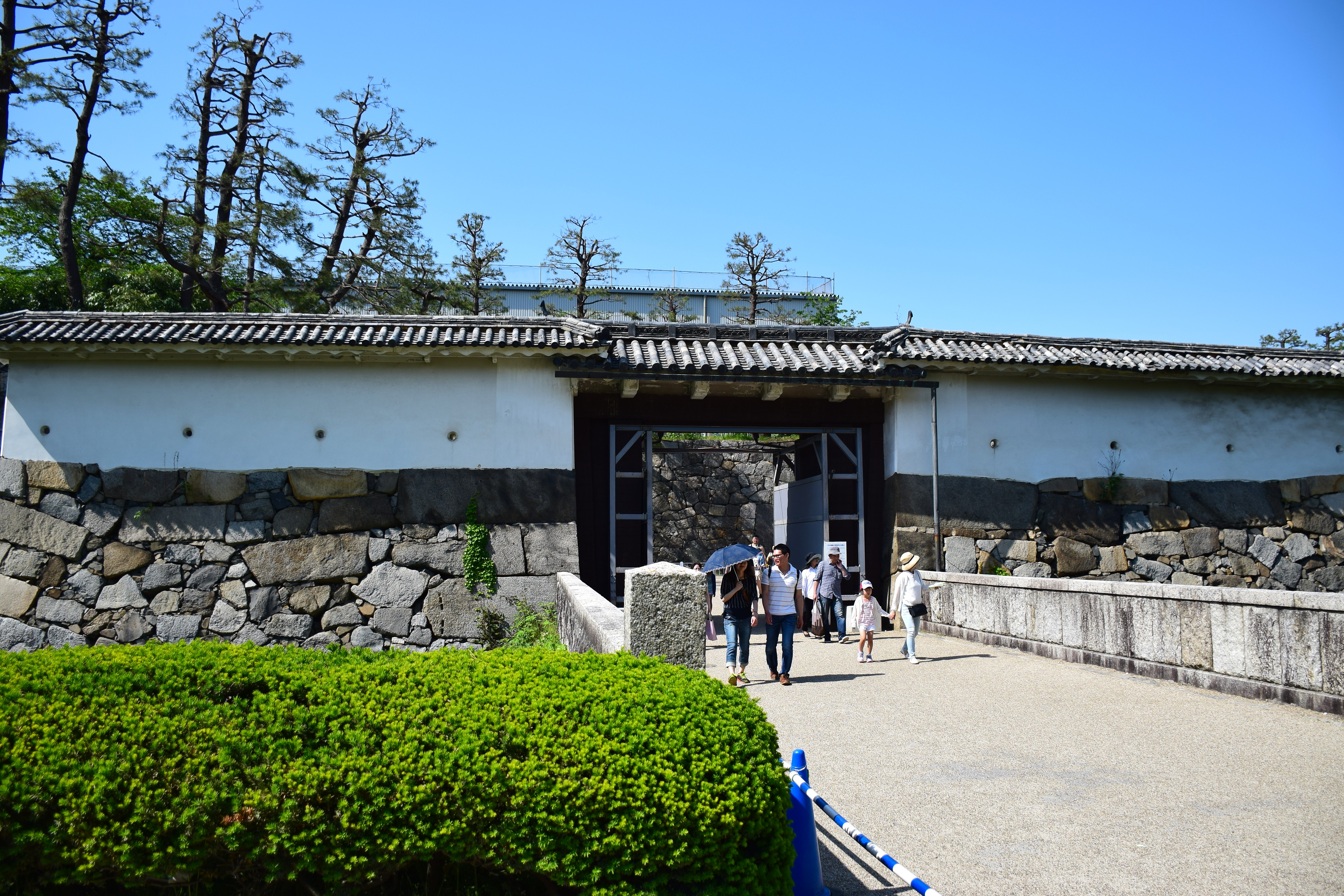
Second south gate of the Honmaru

Many of the gates of Nagoya Castle have a square layout, and the stone walls include several large stones to demonstrate the castle's defense capabilities.

The second south gate (本丸南二之門 Minami-ninomon) is the outer structure that leads from the Nishinomaru into the inner Honmaru enceinte. It has heavy timber columns and a crossbar covered with especially-thick strong iron plates. On either side of the gate are rare examples of fireproofed plaster walls. It has a gabled and tiled roof. The door is latticed for reinforcement.

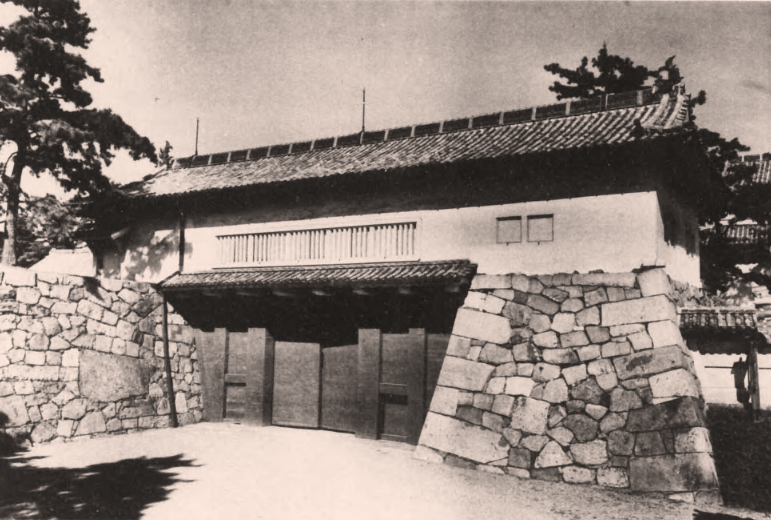
First south gate of the Honmaru

The first south gate (本丸南ー之門) was a tower gate (櫓門 yagura mon). A barbican tower was built on the stone walls to the north and west. This provided a structure whereby arrows could be fired at attacking enemy forces from three sides. The first south gate and the smaller second south gate along with the barbican formed a square, walled castle gate structure called Masugata Koguchi (枡形虎ロ). The wall section under the front part of the first gate was covered in wooden tiles, and the gate itself was iron-plated. Rocks could be dropped from a machine on the second store.

The whole gate structure was built around 1612. The barbican tower was damaged in the earthquake of 1891, and later completely removed. Detailed measurements and architectural drawings were made in the early Shōwa era. The first gate burnt down in the air raid of 1945, leaving only the stone basis and the smaller second gate. Since the second gate is in its original state, it has been designated an Important Cultural Asset.

=== East gate ===
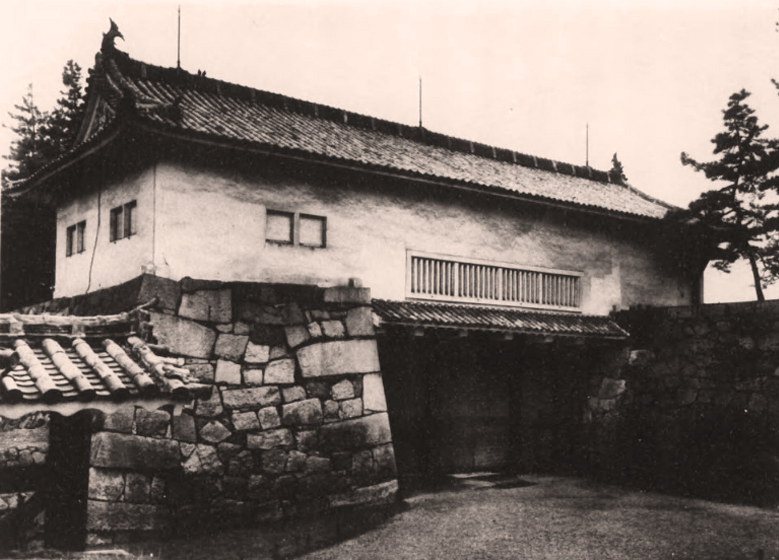
First east gate of the Honmaru

The east gate was a structure similar to the south gate in its layout and appearance. It led from the Ninomaru into the Honmaru enceinte. It was also constructed around 1612. The First East Gate was a sturdy gate that formed a square together with the smaller outer second gate on the right. It also had a gabled, tile-roof along with the smaller gate. The barbican tower that formed the length of the square was badly damaged in the earthquake of 1891 and then removed. The remaining structures were destroyed in the air raid of 1945.

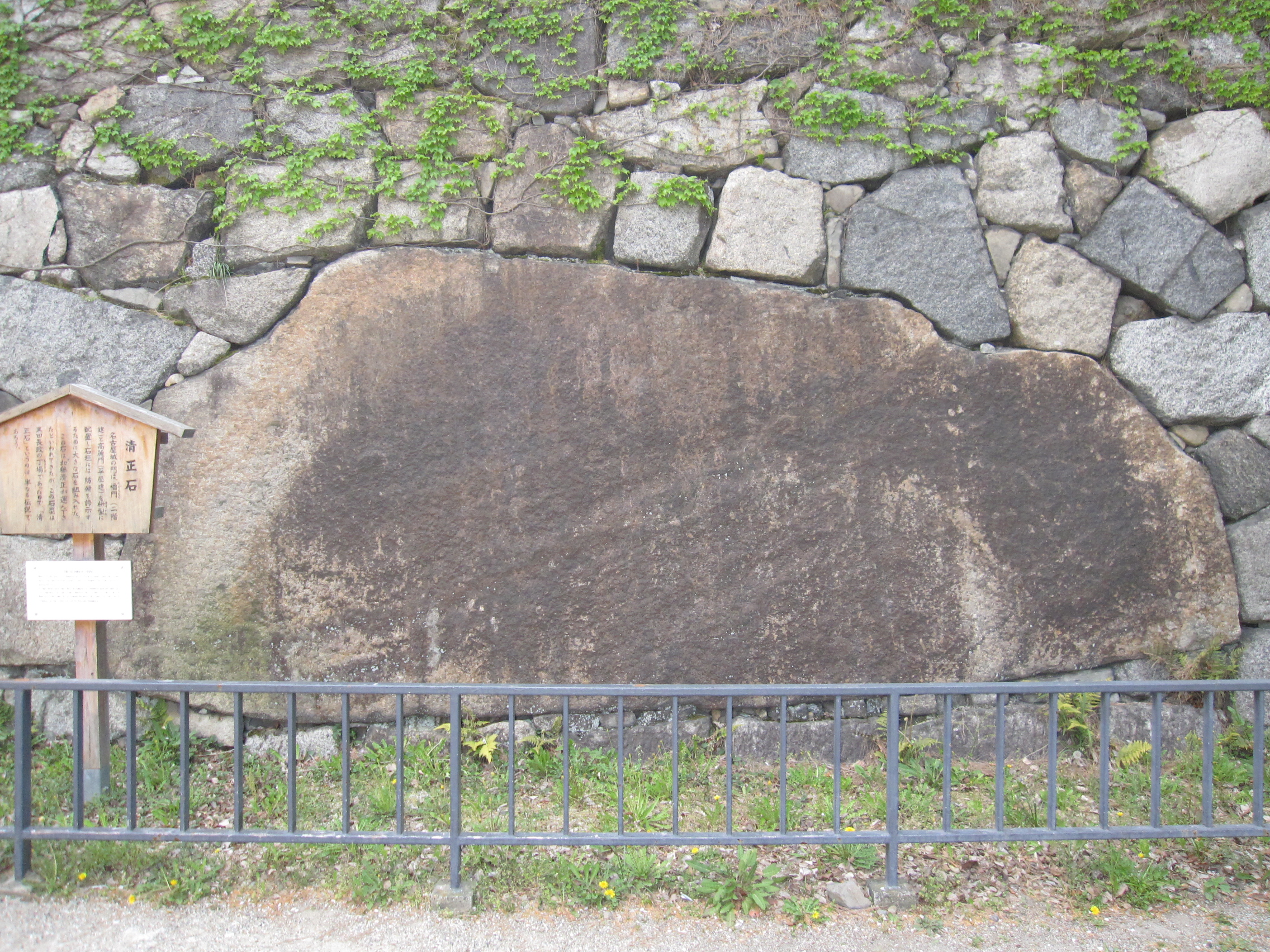
Kiyomasa Stone

Located at the east gate is a very large stone built into the wall. According to legend, Katō Kiyomasa, a renowned general and castle engineer, hauled this large stone that was later named after him to the castle. But it is probable that this part of the castle's foundation was constructed by Kuroda Nagamasa. Feudal lords who were ordered to build the stone walls carved their marks on their stones to distinguish them from the stones of other lords.

=== Northeast turret ===
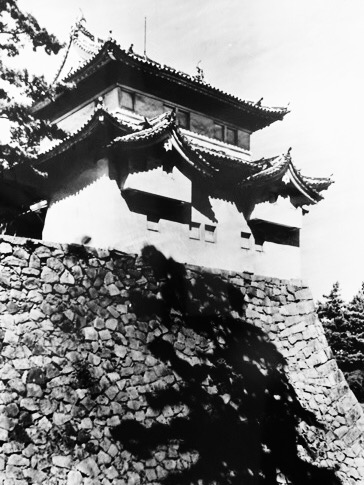
Northeast turret

Also called the Ushitora (ox-tiger 丑寅) turret due to its earthly branches position, the northeast turret (東北隅櫓 Tōhoku-sumi Yagura) had two stories. It was located close to the east gate. The white coating on the mud walls made the structure water- and fireproof. The northeast turret was similar to the southeast and southwest turret and had a similar structure except for the difference in the design of the projecting bay windows (出窓 de-mado).

It was destroyed during World War II.

== Keeps ==
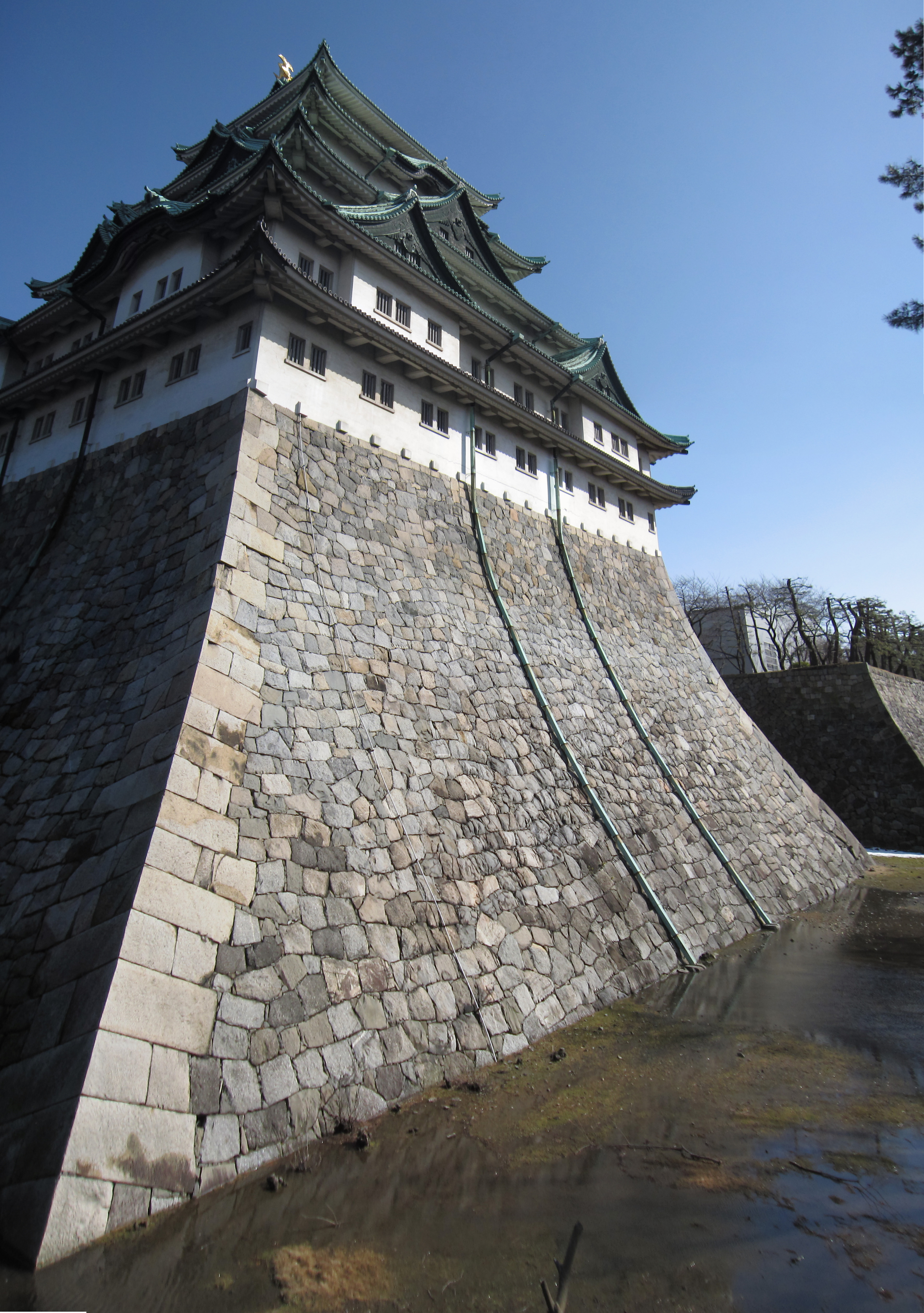
Main keep with the "fan sloping" stone base

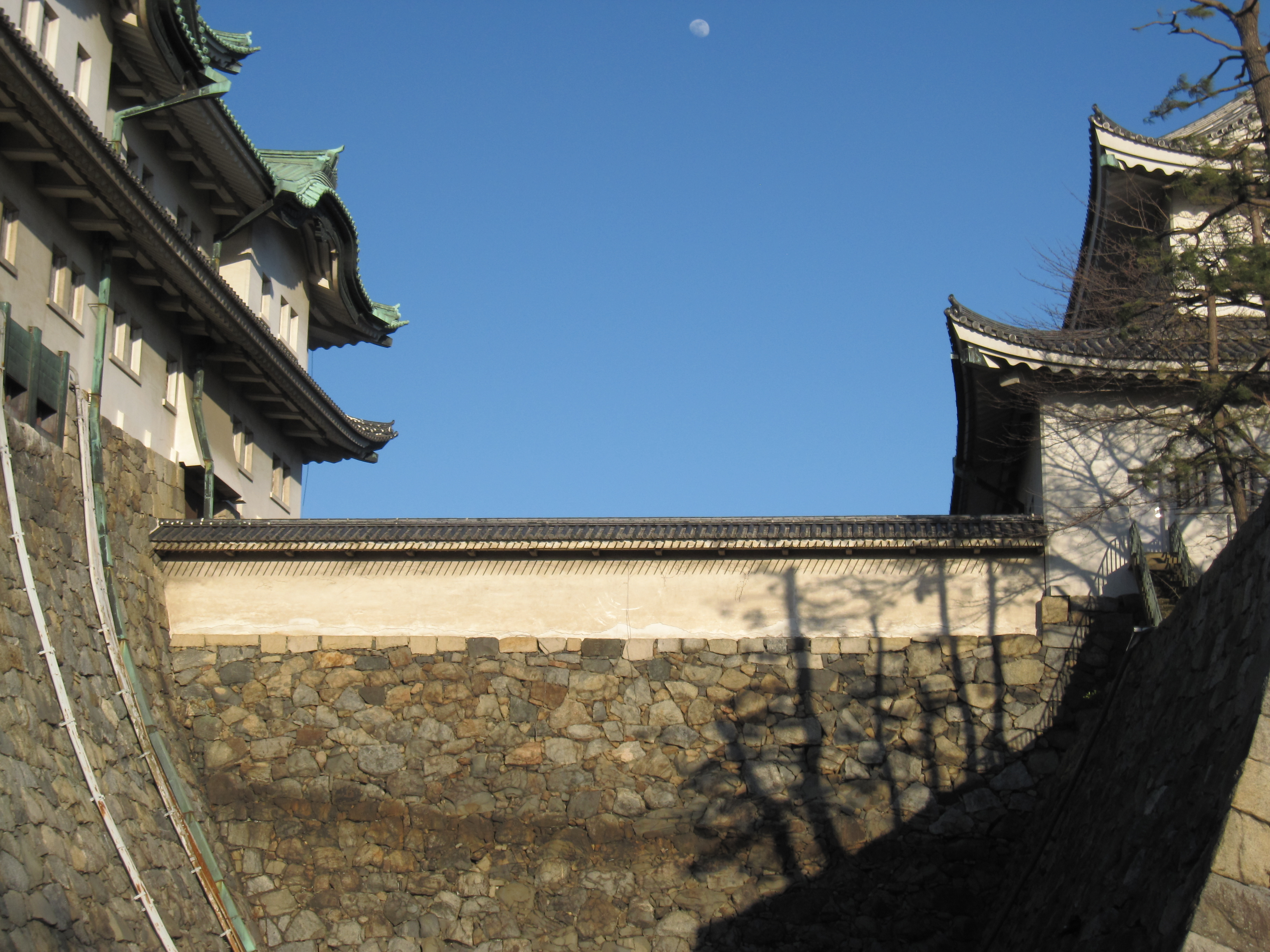
Wall of Swords connecting the two keeps

Nagoya Castle is known for its unique "connected-keep" style of construction, with the main keep of five stories on five different levels and a smaller keep of two levels joined by an abutment bridge. Evidence that another small keep was planned for the west side of the main keep can be found in traces of an entryway in the upper part of the stone wall foundation on that side. The entryway to the small keep was also planned for the west side. However, during the construction, the location was changed to where it is today. Traces of the original entryway remain inside the stone wall.

Various types of weapons were stored on the first level of the castle's main keep. Flammable materials such as gunpowder were kept in facilities outside the castle.

The small and main keep both burned down during World War II, and were reconstructed in 1959 with the use of modern materials such as steel beams and concrete. In 2017 the city announced the donation drive to completely reconstruct the keeps again in wood based on the original plans and surveys done before the war. The aim is to complete the main tower by 2022. The webpage for online donations was opened in 2020.

The job of constructing the castle walls was divided among twenty feudal lords, including Katō Kiyomasa. The walls of the keep were built by the Katō family and the cornerstones of the building bear the inscriptions of the family members in charge of the construction. Those of Katō and his retainers can be seen on the northeast corner. There are marks of figures of triangles in circles in the stone walls of the castle, as well as the rough outlines of folding fans, war fans, and other objects. These are called kokumon (carved crests), and represent the different daimyō lords and their vassals who were apportioned sections in the construction. The signs were carved into the stone so that there would be no mistake as to which lord contributed which stone in the transportation, and to avoid disputes. Some of the foundation stones of the main castle tower were moved to a lawn on the north side during the 1959 reconstruction due to damage from the immense heat of the fire and subsequent collapse of the tower.

The stone wall supporting the keep was constructed by a technique called ogi kobai or "fan sloping", by which the upper part of the wall is curved outward like a fan. This wall is also called the Kiyomasa-style Crescent Stone Wall, after the general and engineer Katō Kiyomasa, who was in charge of its construction. The fan sloping technique was used to prevent swelling by curving the middle portion of the wall inward, thereby evenly balancing the stone weight against the pressure of sand and earth within.

There is a roofless corridor between the main and the small keep. The walls in this corridor were earthen and stone. Mounted on the outer part of the west side are numerous 30 centimetre-long spearheads to thwart enemy troops from climbing over the eaves. A similar sword-fence can be found at the Fumei Gate, facing the east side of the main keep.

=== Golden shachi ===
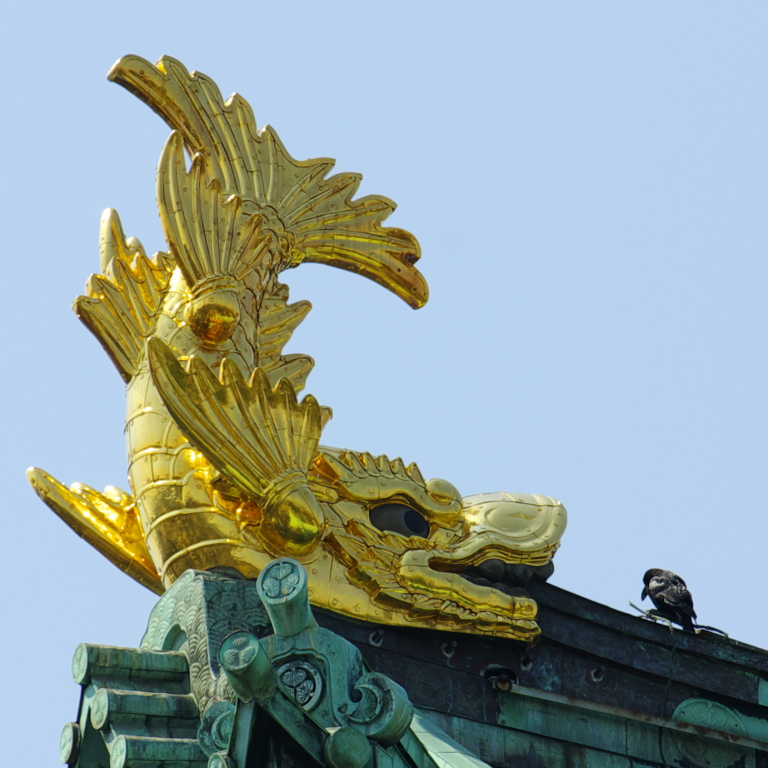
A kinshachi on the roof of the main keep

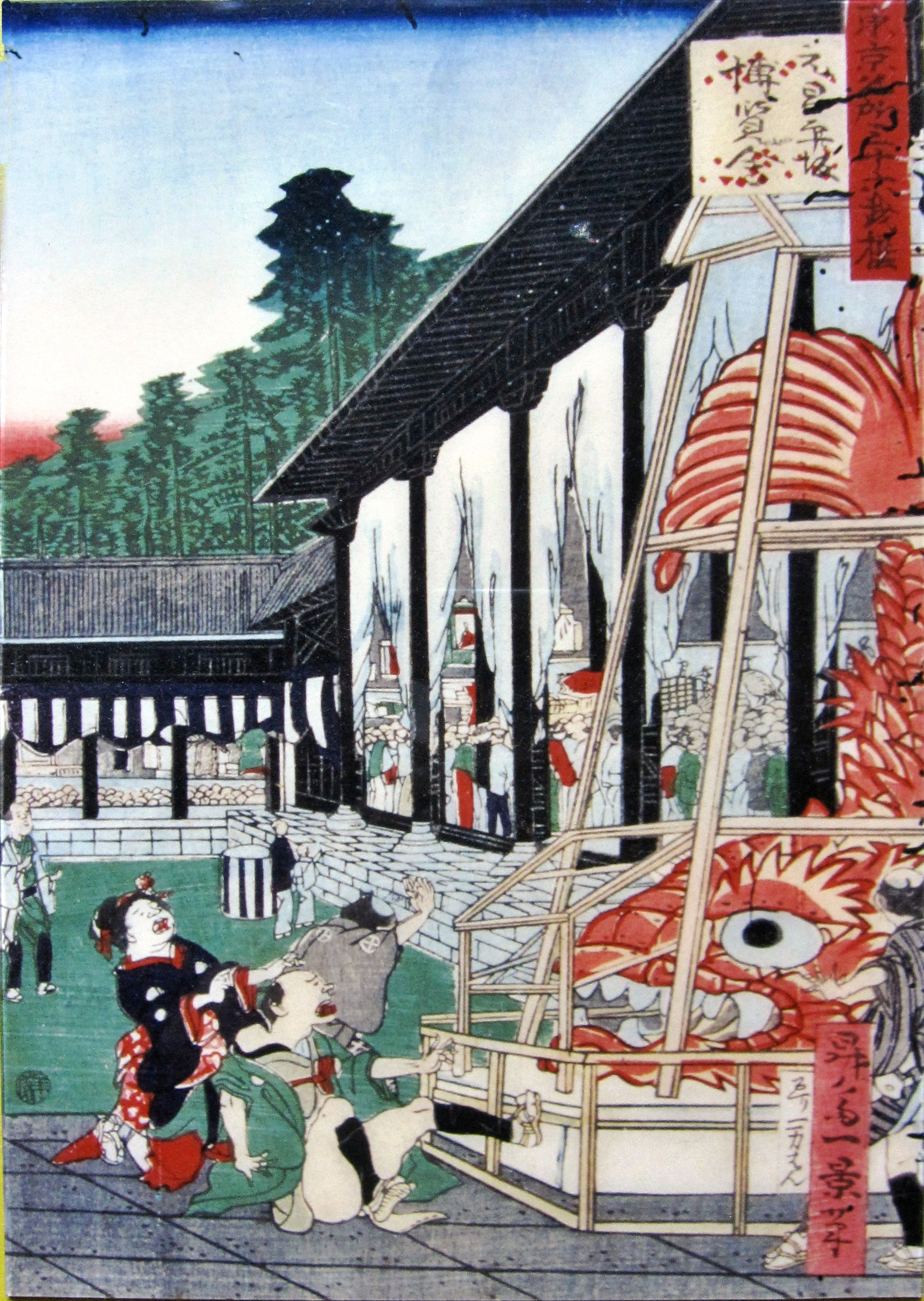
One of the golden shachi at the 1872 Yushima Seido Exhibition in Tokyo, a precursor to the Tokyo National Museum

There are two golden shachi (金鯱, kinshachi) on either end of the topmost castle roof. A beast from Japanese mythology, shachi are tiger-headed dolphins or carp considered to have control over the rain. As such, they were employed in traditional Japanese architecture as a talisman to prevent fires. They first appeared in the Muromachi Era (1334–1400) and also served as a symbol of the lord's authority.

The original shachi were formed over a roughly carved block of wood, over which lead sheets were applied. Copper was placed over the lead before the application of the final layer of gold, which was produced by pounding gold coins into thin sheets. It is said that the gold used amounted to a value of 17,975 ryō (taels), when converted from Keicho-period coins. The core of the golden shachi is composed of hinoki cypress; originally the foundation was sawara cypress.

The golden shachi were melted down and recast three times during the Edo period, when the Owari branch suffered severe economic hardship. When the shachi were recast in Bunsei 10 (1827), the purity of the gold was greatly decreased. In order to conceal the diminished luster, openings in the mesh in the protective bird screens built around the shachi were made smaller during the Kyōho period (1715–1735).

After the Meiji Restoration, there was a trend to abandon old ways, and plans were made to dismantle the castle keeps. During this time, the golden shachi were donated by the Owari branch to the imperial government. In Meiji 4 (1871) they were removed from the main keep and transported to Tokyo from Atsuta Port.

In March 1872 (Meiji 5), the male shachi was exhibited at the Yushima Seido Exhibition in Tokyo, considered the founding event of the Tokyo National Museum. It was later displayed at regional expositions held in Ishikawa, Oita, Ehime, and Nagoya. The female shachi was exhibited at the World Exposition in Vienna in 1873. Later, when it was decided to preserve the keep, a movement to return the shachi was initiated. In Meiji 11 (1878), the golden shachi were returned to Nagoya and restored to their original position in February of the following year.

Later in Meiji 9 (1937), during an inspection by the Castle Imperial Grant Commemorative Committee, a thief climbed the scaffold and stole some of the golden fish scales. He was later caught in Osaka. Responsibility for this incident was traced back to city executives. Since the Meiji era, the golden shachi have been stolen three times.

The shachi were destroyed by fire during World War II. The second-generation golden shachi were cast in the Osaka Mint and transported to the castle in March 1959 (Shōwa 39). Both kinshachi were lowered temporarily from atop the castle and displayed on the castle grounds briefly in September 1984 (Shōwa 59) for the Nagoya Castle Exhibition, and again from March 19 to June 19, 2005 (Heisei 17), at the site of the Expo 2005. They were restored to the top beam of the castle roof on July 9 of the same year.

The male and female shachi were again lowered by helicopter on March 8, 2021, for an exhibition during the COVID-19 pandemic.

The northern kinshachi is male, has a height of 2.621 m (8 ft 7.2 in), weighs 1,272 kg (2,804 lb) (44.69 kg or 98.5 lb of which is gold), and has 112 scales. The southern kinshachi is female, has a height of 2.579 m (8 ft 5.5 in), weighs 1,215 kg (2,679 lb) (of which 43.39 kg or 95.7 lb is gold), and has 126 scales. Both shachi are covered with 18-carat gold plate 0.15 mm (0.0059 in) thick.

=== Palace Camellia ===
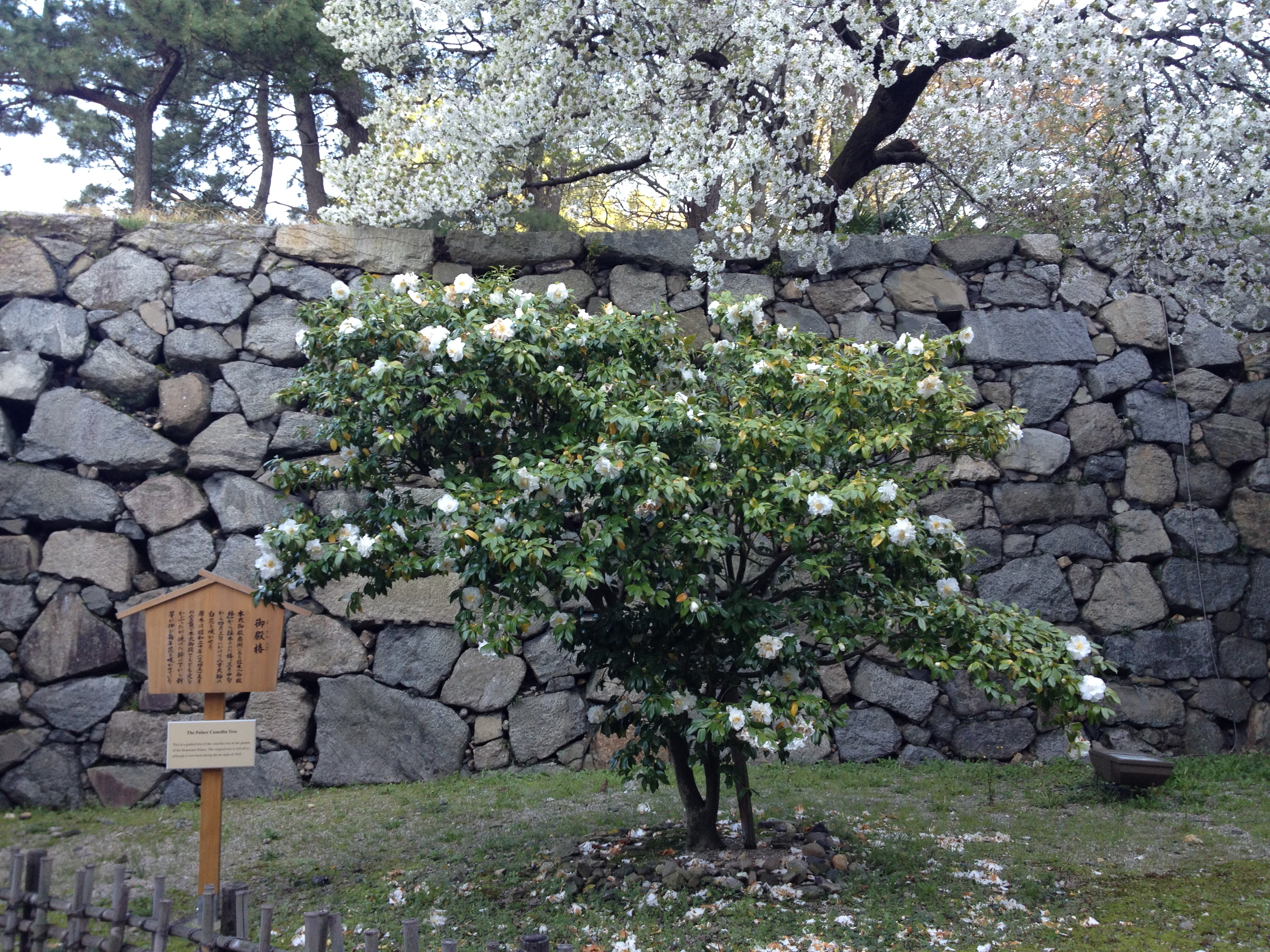
Camellia japonica tree

There was once a Camellia japonica tree somewhere in the garden south of Honmaru Palace. It was called Palace Camellia (御殿椿 Goten tsubaki). Since the Edo period this tree was considered to be a secret treasure of the Owari domain. It blossomed every spring producing large white flowers. The original tree was thought to have been killed when the castle burned down during an air raid in 1945, but new buds started to grow from the charred stump. The current tree was grafted from the original in 1955 and continues to grow today.

=== Fumei Gate ===
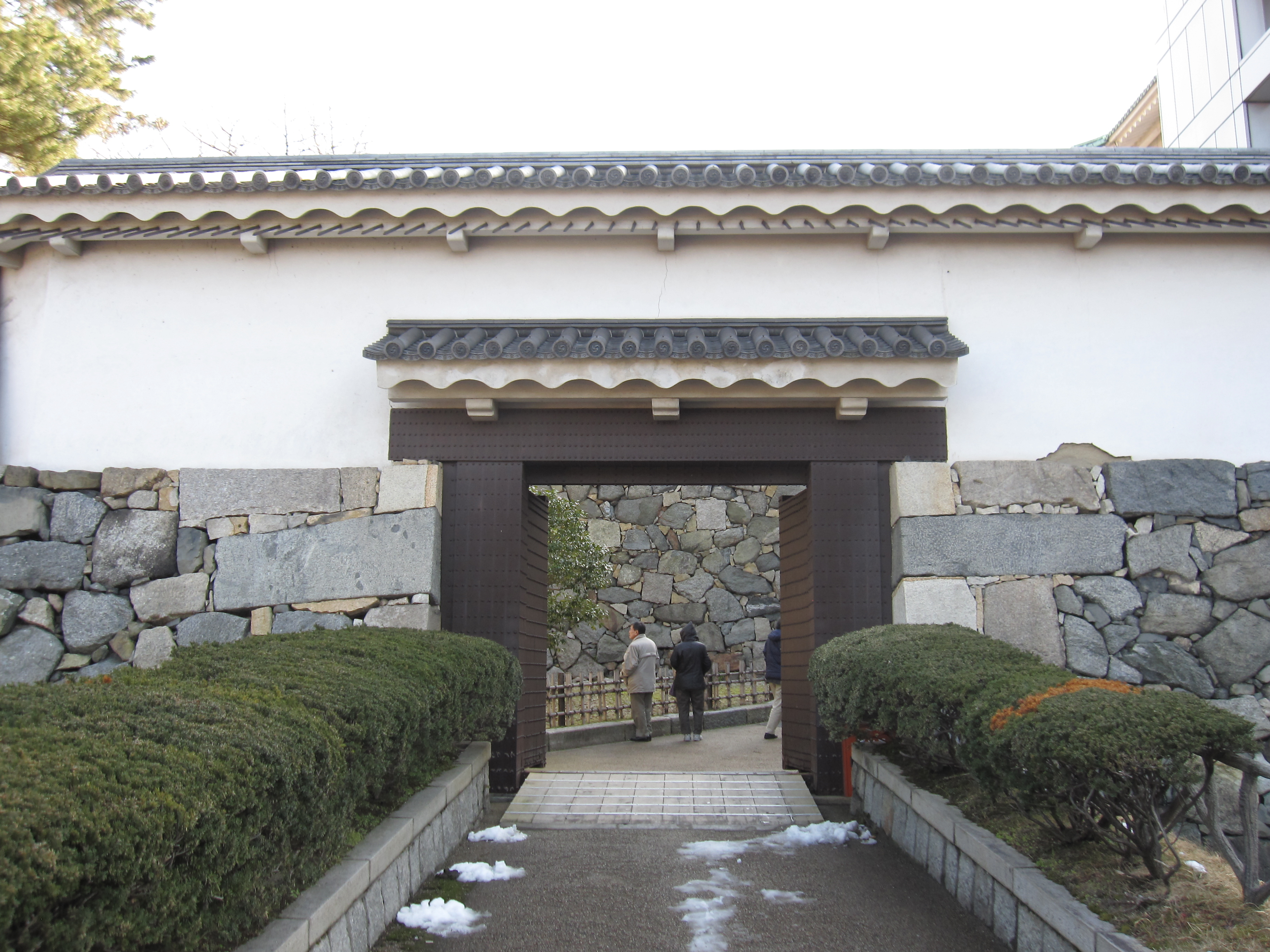
Fumei Gate

The Fumei Gate (Fumei-mon) is located in the Tamon Wall, which leads into the Honmaru. It was always locked securely and therefore known as "the gate that never opens". The wall is called a "sword wall", because spearheads under the eaves prevented penetration by spies or attackers. The gate was destroyed in an air raid on May 14, 1945. It was reconstructed to its original form in March 1978.

== Ninomaru ==
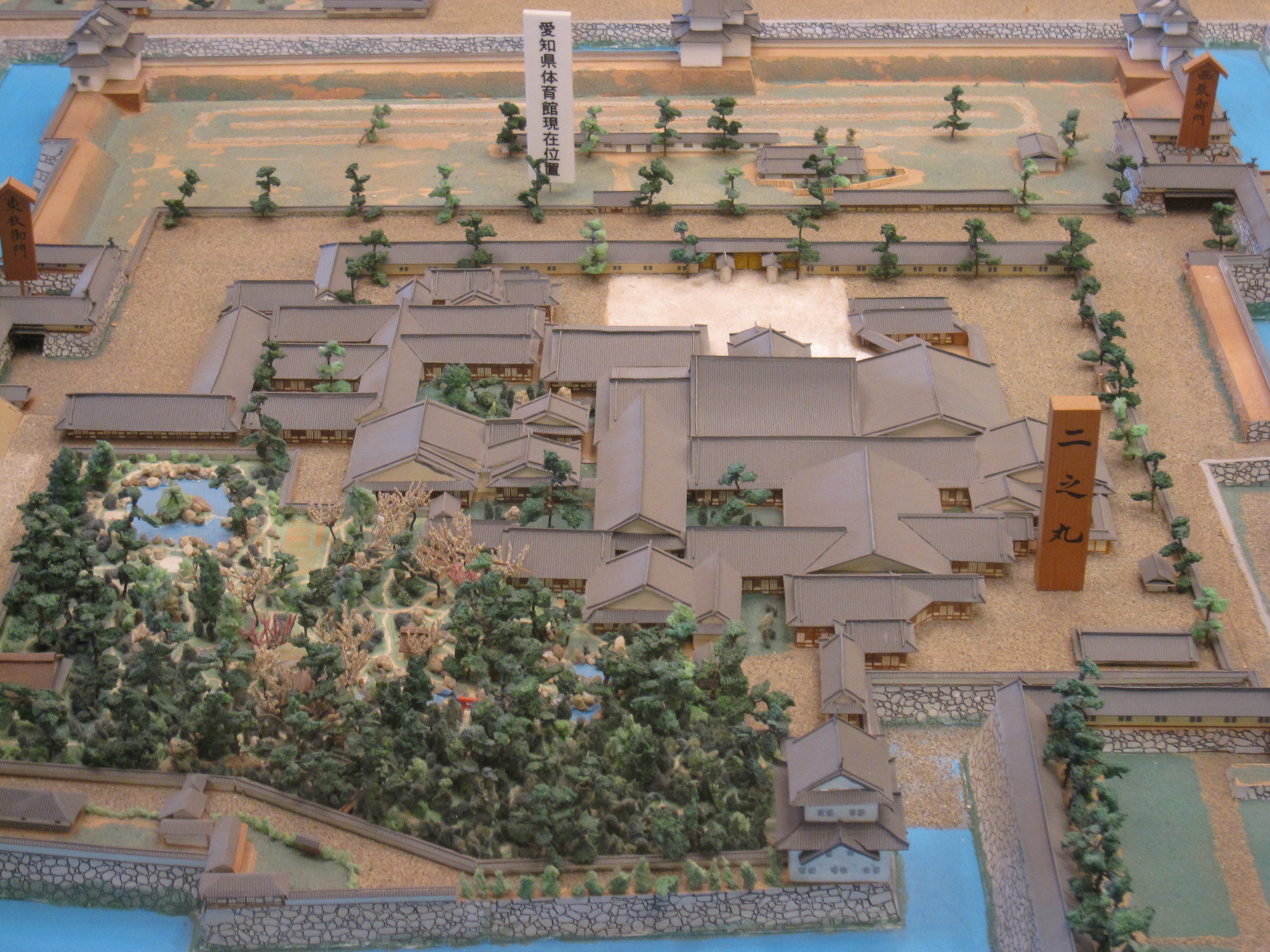
Model of the Ninomaru palace and its garden, seen from north

The Ninomaru Palace (二の丸御殿, Ninomaru Goten) is thought to have been completed in 1617. Tokugawa Yoshinao, the first feudal lord of Owari, moved to this palace from Honmaru Palace in 1620. Besides serving as the residence of the lord, the palace functioned as the administrative center of the feudal government. It was further extended and renovated in later years.

Three chief retainers of the Owari branch were executed in the Ninomaru Palace in 1868 in what became known as the Aomatsuba Incident. Early in the Shōwa period, around 1926, a monument was erected at the execution site. The exact site is unknown; it is thought to have taken place 100 metres south of the current site of the monument. The stone stele was re-erected after the original one disappeared.

The Ninomaru existed until the Kaei period (1848–54). Facilities for conducting clan affairs, residences for retainers, gardens, and stables (Mukaiyashiki) were located there. The western two-thirds of the area was known as the Oshiro (the castle), while the eastern one-third was called Ninomaru Goten (the palace). The gardens originally included flowering trees, stone lanterns, and a traditional Japanese-style tea arbour. After the Meiji Restoration, the original was demolished to build army barracks, but it was restored and designated as an official scenic spot after the war.

The palace had two stages for performances of Noh: the omote-butai, or front stage, and oku-butai, the rear stage. Noh was performed to commemorate a lord's succession to a fiefdom and to celebrate the birth of an heir. The Tokugawas of Owari were patrons of many Noh actors, and the modern Nagoya Noh Theater, which opened in April 1997, is located in the Sannomaru enceinte.

The Tokugawa Art Museum has a partial reconstruction of the Ninomaru palace reception chambers, such as the Kusari-no-ma and the Hiro-ma, which include display alcoves, staggered shelves, and writing alcoves equipped with authentic furnishings. A reconstruction of one of the Noh stages of the Ninomaru can also be seen in the museum.

Another stone stele is also located in the Ninomaru honouring the Tokugawa clan army methods. The ninth son of Tokugawa Ieyasu and leader of the Owari clan, Tokugawa Yoshinao, authored a book on warfare tactics called the Gunsho-gōkan (軍書合鑑). The inscriptions on this stone monument are 「王命に依って催さるる事」「藩訓秘伝之跡」. The book, which was passed down from generation to generation, contains diverse Tokugawa family war tactics. The stone's inscription is distinctive since it expresses a political philosophy of obeisance to the Emperor. At the start of the Meiji Restoration, the Tokugawa dynasty, who were in power at the time, announced that they would adhere to this idea and follow the Emperor.

=== Ninomaru Second Great Gate ===
The Ninomaru Second Great Gate (二之丸大手二之門 Ninomaru Ōte Ni-no-mon) along with the Ichinomon (first gate), which has been dismantled, were known as the Nishikurogane gate and served as the main entrance to the Ninomaru enceinte. It is located on the south side of the west face of the Ninomaru. The remaining gate is in the Kōrai-mon (高麗門 "Goryeo Gate") style. It is registered as an Important Cultural Property.

=== Former Ninomaru Second East Gate ===
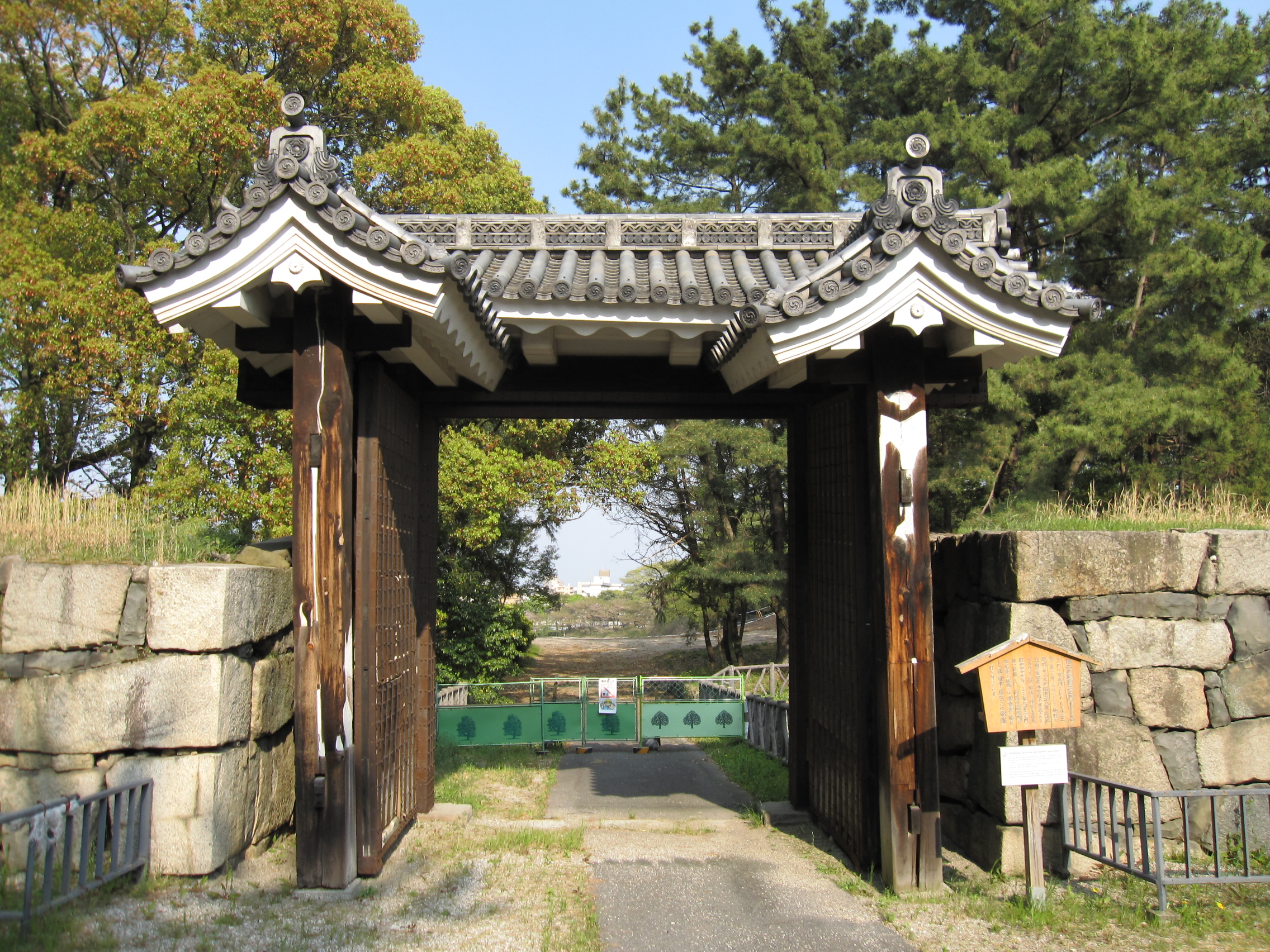
Former Ninomaru second east gate

The former Ninomaru Second East Gate (二之丸東二之門 Ninomaru Higashi Ni-no-mon), also called the East Iron Gate, was the outer gate of the Ninomaru enceinte on the east side. It was a box-like structure with two separate gates opening into and out of the enclosure. The remaining gate is in the Kōrai-mon (高麗門 "Goryeo Gate") style. It was probably constructed around Keichō 17 (1614). In 1963 the gate was dismantled and stored temporarily to make way for the construction of the Aichi Prefectural Gymnasium. In 1972 the gate was relocated to the site of the old Honmaru east gate, where it stands today. The gate is inscribed as an Important Cultural Property.

=== Uzumi Gate ===
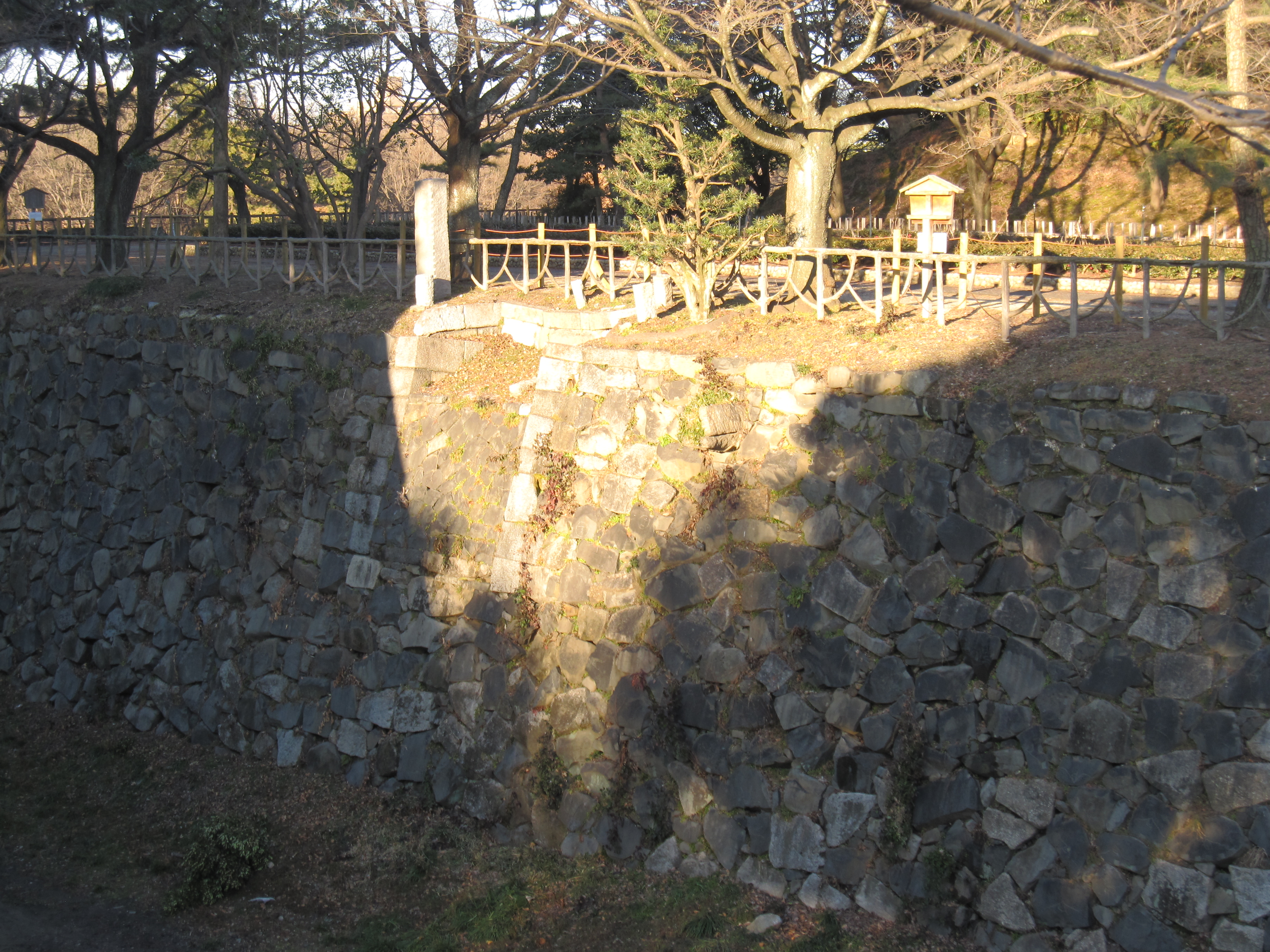
Remains of the Uzumi Gate

The Uzumi Gate (埋御門 Uzumi Go-mon) led to a tunnel that ran beneath the castle walls. This tunnel was the secret escape route to be used by the lord of the castle during times of emergency. The remains of the entrance can be found in the northwest part of the Ninomaru garden. Steep wooden stairs led down to the water moat. The lord could cross the moat by boat to reach the Ofukemaru garden on the opposite side. He could then use a secret escape route to reach the Kisokaidō by way of Doishita (土居下), Kachigawa (勝川), and Jōkō-ji (Seto).

=== Namban Wall ===
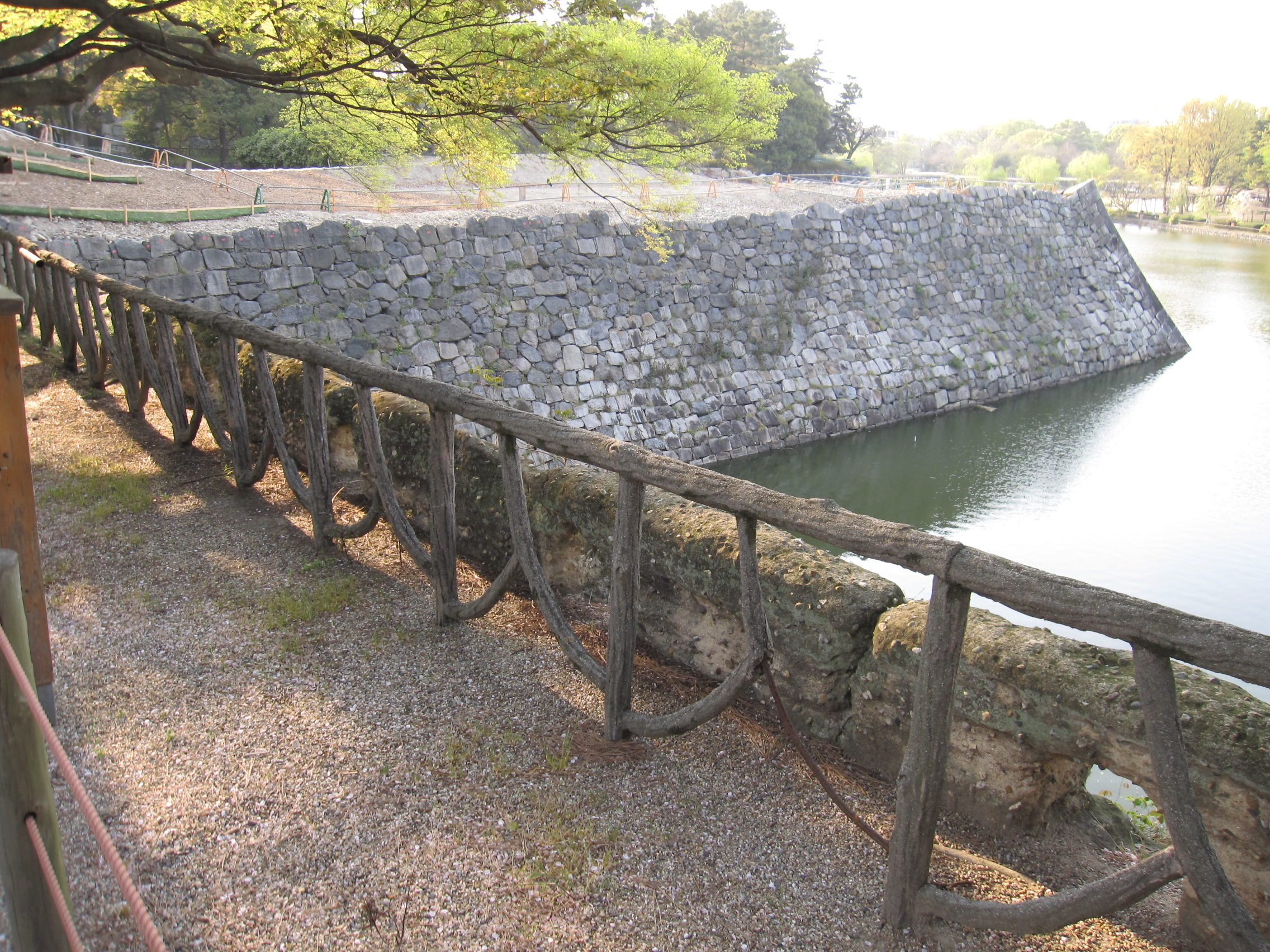
Namban earthen wall

The remains of the Nanban ("European") wall can be seen north of the Ninomaru garden, running from east to west on top of the stone wall. This sturdy wall was constructed using the European plaster method topped with tiles, and had many round gunports. Today this wall is considered to be a unique feature to Nagoya Castle and has been designed an important cultural asset.

=== Ninomaru garden ===
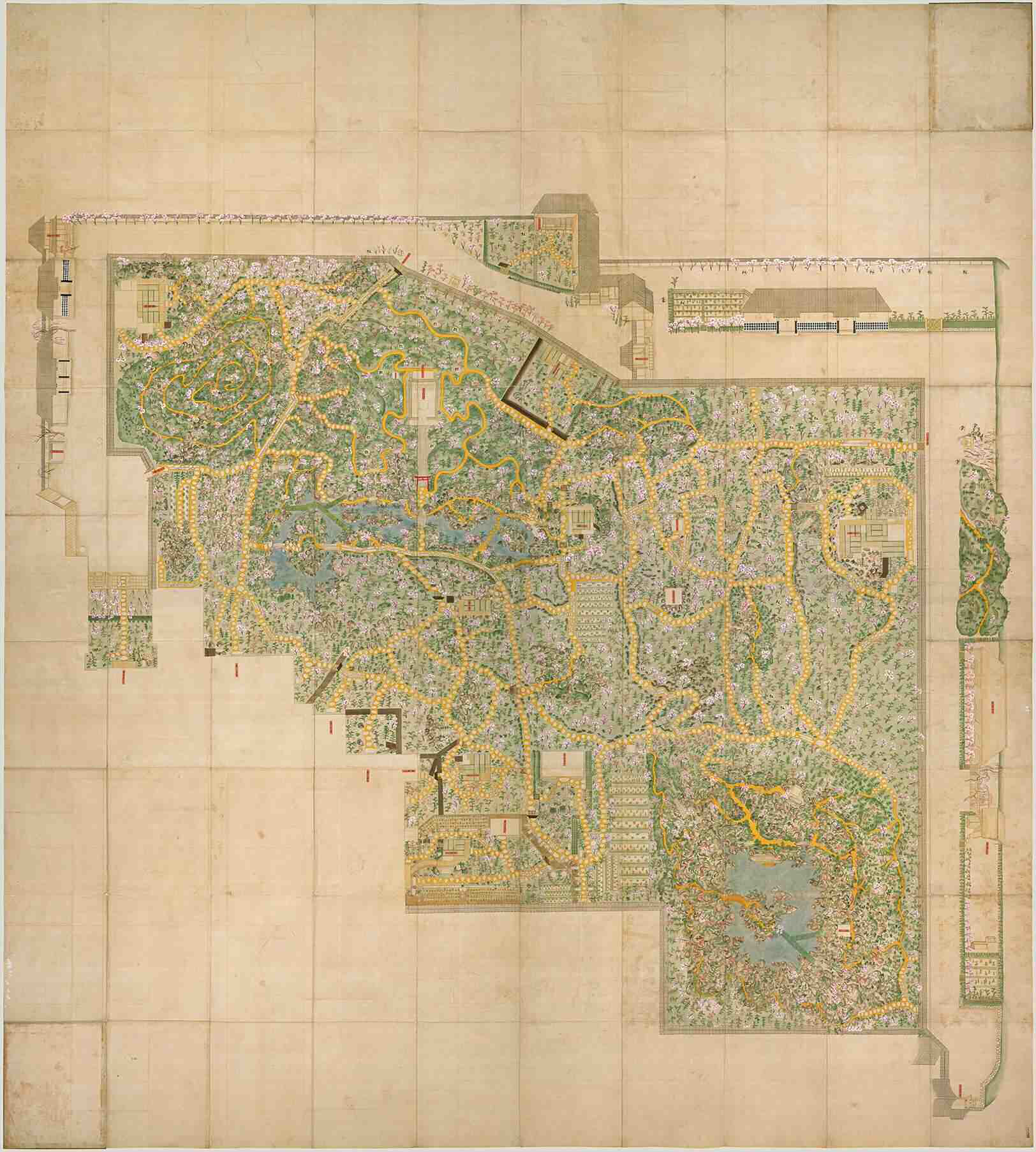
Plan of the later Ninomaru garden from the Oshiro Oniwa-ezu, Edo period

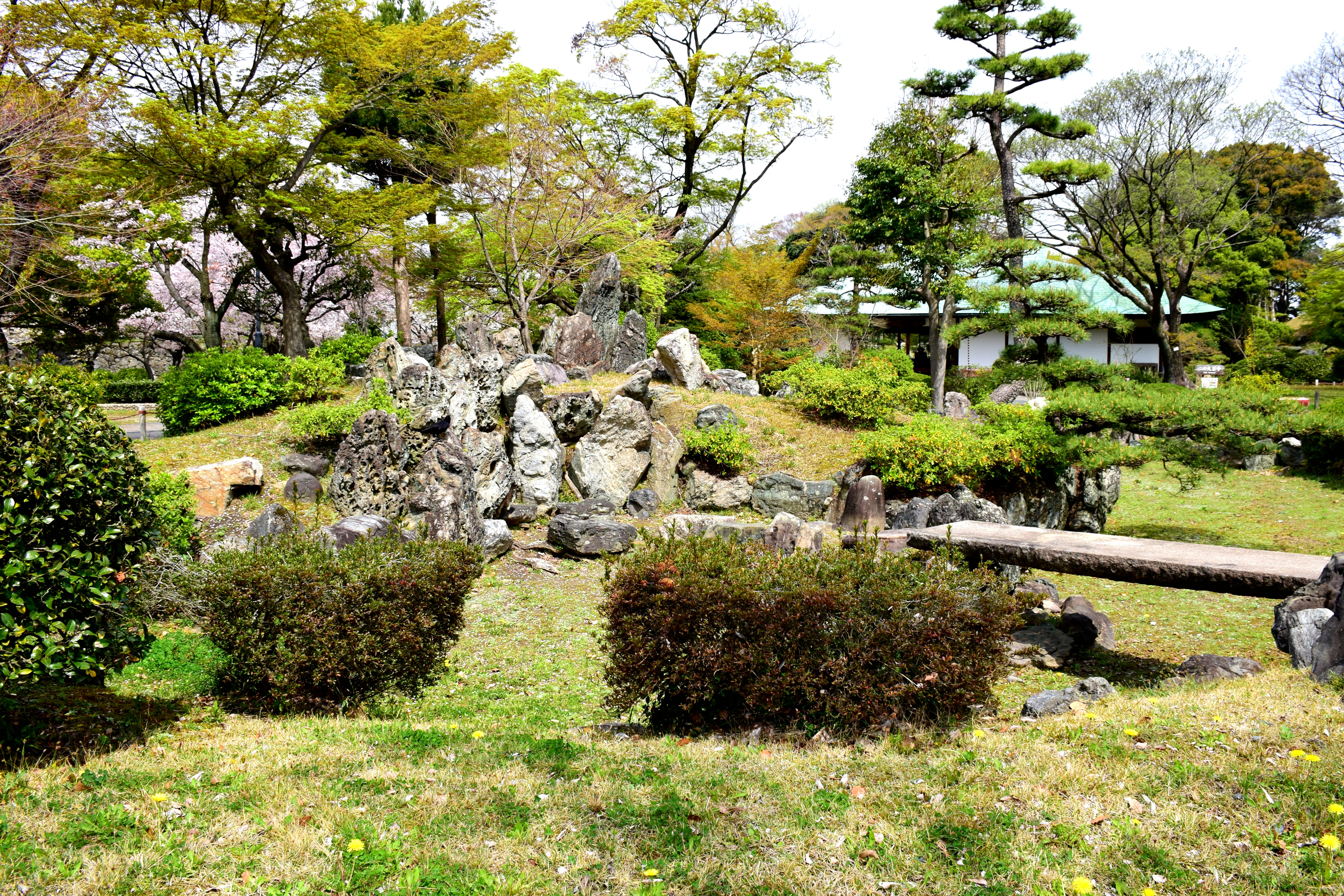
Ninomaru garden

The garden of the Ninomaru palace was built between 1615 and 1623 under Tokugawa Yoshinao, at the same time when the palace was constructed. The sanctuary on the north side of the palace was its centrepiece. It was transformed into a Japanese dry landscape garden in 1716. According to the Oshiro Oniwa Ezu (御城御庭絵図), a historic drawing of the old castle garden, the Ninomaru palace garden was grand in scale, featuring Mt. Gongen (権現山) in the north, Mt. Sazae (栄螺山) in the west, a large pond in the south, and six tea houses in various locations around the garden. The boundaries around the garden featured pavilions, gates, and a library (御文庫). Many large rocks are within its boundaries. On top of the hill the thickly growing trees offered the lord protection from enemies by providing a hiding place and a secret escape route. These characteristics of the garden have faded over the years, but the basic structure still remains. The garden has been expanded and undergone restorations over the years, especially between 1818 and 1829/1830 under the tenure of Tokugawa Naritomo. During the early Meiji era, when Nagoya Castle was under the control of the Imperial Japanese Army, barracks were set up in the eastern part. Mt. Gongen was leveled and the pond was filled in. In 1975, part of the garden was excavated using old drawings as a guide. The garden was renovated mainly around four unearthed structures: the North and South Ponds, the site of the Soketsu-tei teahouse, and the so-called North Culvert. The four rebuilt structures form the main features of the 14,000 square metres (150,000 sq ft) garden. Also nearby are flowerbeds of peonies and other flowers. The garden was opened to the public in April 1978 and named the Ninomaru East Garden. The Ninomaru garden was designated a National Place of Scenic Beauty in 1953, with the area under protection expanded in 2018. Excavations started in 2016 to uncover the historic remains and plans exist to recreate the original layout and features.

This dry landscape garden covers an area of 5,137 square metres (55,290 sq ft) and is separated into north and south areas. The north half of the garden retains more of the shape of the original garden. The pond, surrounded by five artificial mountains, has several islands. There are various kinds of walkways around the garden, including a stone bridge, a mountain pathway, and a shoreline path. The pond represents a ravine with many round rocks.

The garden has many high-quality trees from various regions throughout Japan and some of them, including the pines, have medicinal uses. Located in the garden is a modern teahouse constructed of hinoki cypress from the Kiso region. A tatami mat room and a washing room are located inside.

==== North Culvert ====
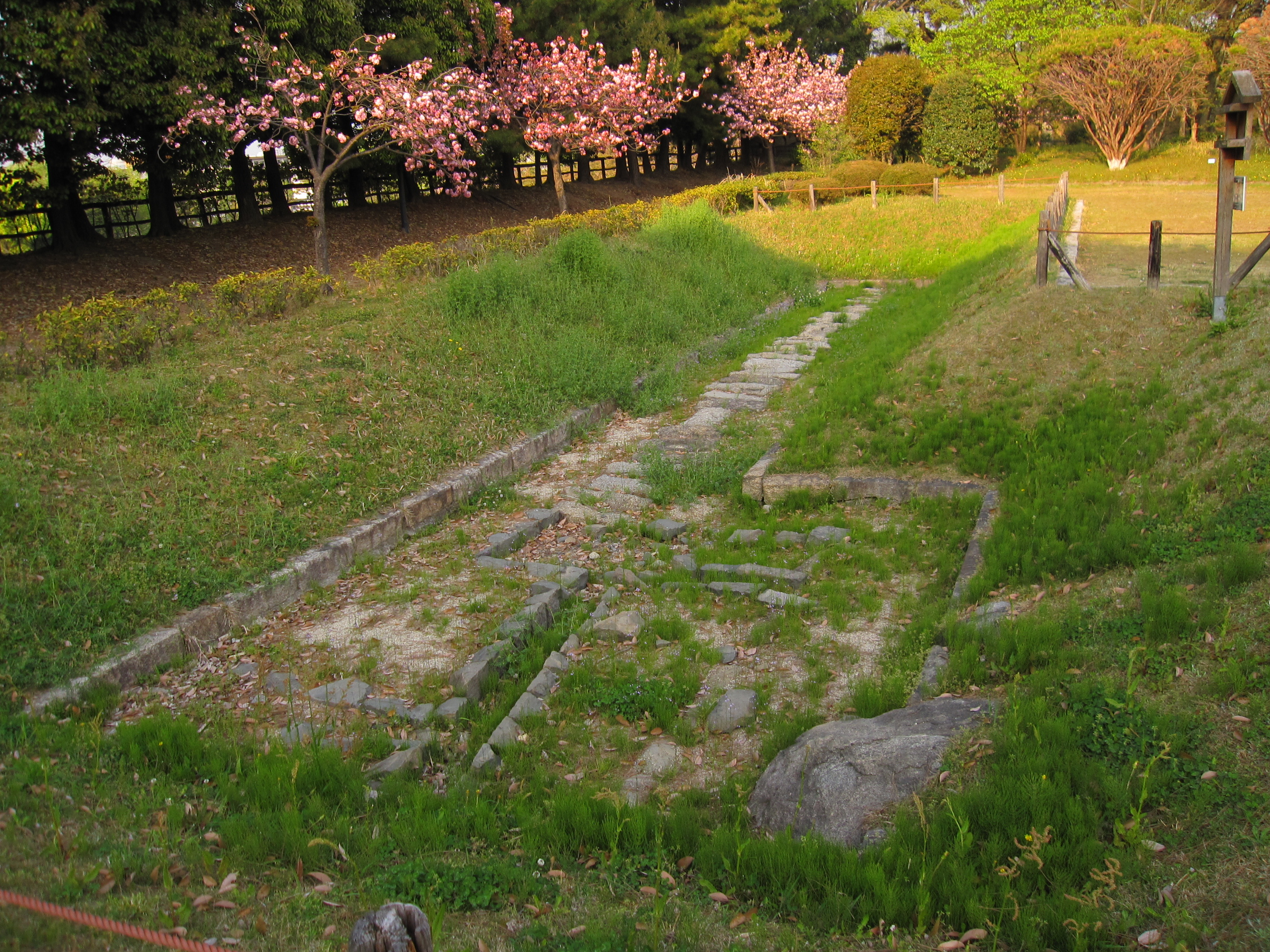
North Culvert

The remains of a north culvert (北暗渠), or drain, located outside the garden on the northern boundary, depicted in Oshiro Oniwa Ezu, were found in the course of an excavation survey and faithfully restored. The drain is thought to be the remains of a stone culvert for channeling rainwater, as mentioned in the Kinjō Onkoroku (金城温古録) document. Even today, rainwater is channeled to the moat through this drain. The stone materials of the culvert include granite for the lid and hard sandstone for the sides. According to the drawing, there was also a flower bed nearby.

==== Tea houses ====
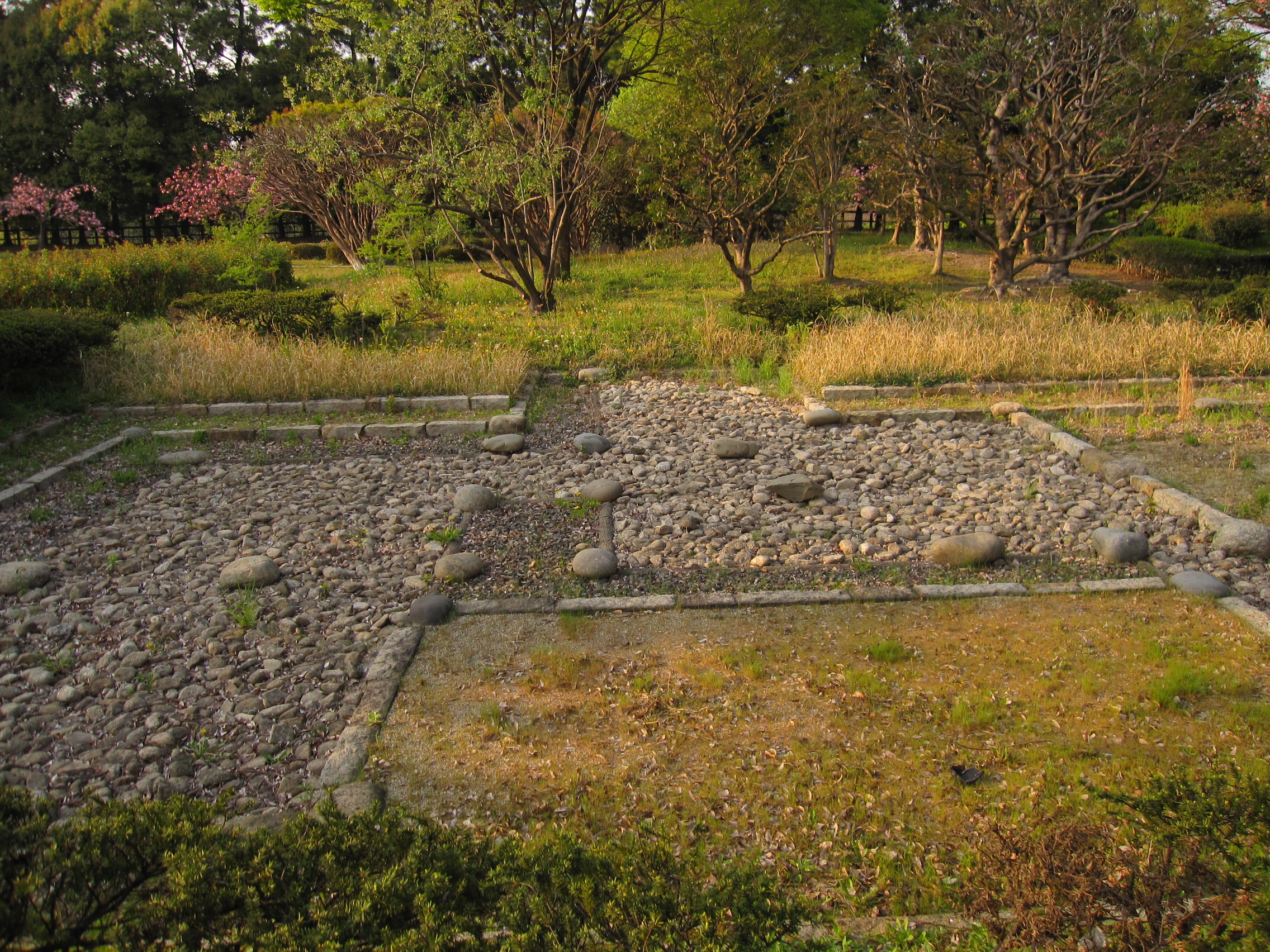
Site of the Sōketsu-tei tea house

Six chashitsu tea houses were located in the old Ninomaru garden, which were the Tashun-en (多春園), Yamashita Oseki (山下御席), Yohō-tei (余芳), Fūshin-tei (風信), Sōketsu-tei (霜傑亭) and the Sarumen Chaseki (猿面茶席). Tashun-en was located at the northwest corner of the Ninomaru, the Yamashita Oseki in north at the foot of Mount Gongen, Yohō-tei in the centre, and Fūshin-tei towards the south next to the palace. The Sarumen Chaseki was located at the eastern border. A reconstruction of it is located in the tea house area of the Ofukemaru and in the Tokugawa Museum. The Sōketsu-tei (霜傑亭), the largest one, was located in the northeastern part and was built in the sukiya style. In an excavation survey, a site was identified almost exactly matching that of the Sōketsu-tei as depicted in Oniwa Ezu. Today, cobblestones are placed to mark where tatami mats would have been, rubble and plaster where the hallway was, and gravel on the other surfaces for an easy understanding of the original structure.

When the old Ninomaru garden was destroyed, two teahouses were sold off to private citizens, dismantled and set up in different locations:

The Yohō-tei (余芳) was a teahouse with four-and-a-half tatami size. In the first year of the Meiji era, it was acquired by a private individual. It was transferred twice more, in 1892 (Meiji 25) and 1939 (Showa 14), close to Higashi Ōte Station. It is registered by the city as a Cultural Property. In 2022 the city council debated the moving of the teahouse back. The Watanabe Komuten carpentry company was tasked with the restoration in preparation of the relocation.

The Fūshin-tei (風信) is located close to Jōshin Station in Nishi-ku. It is also registered by the city as a Cultural Property.

==== South Pond ====
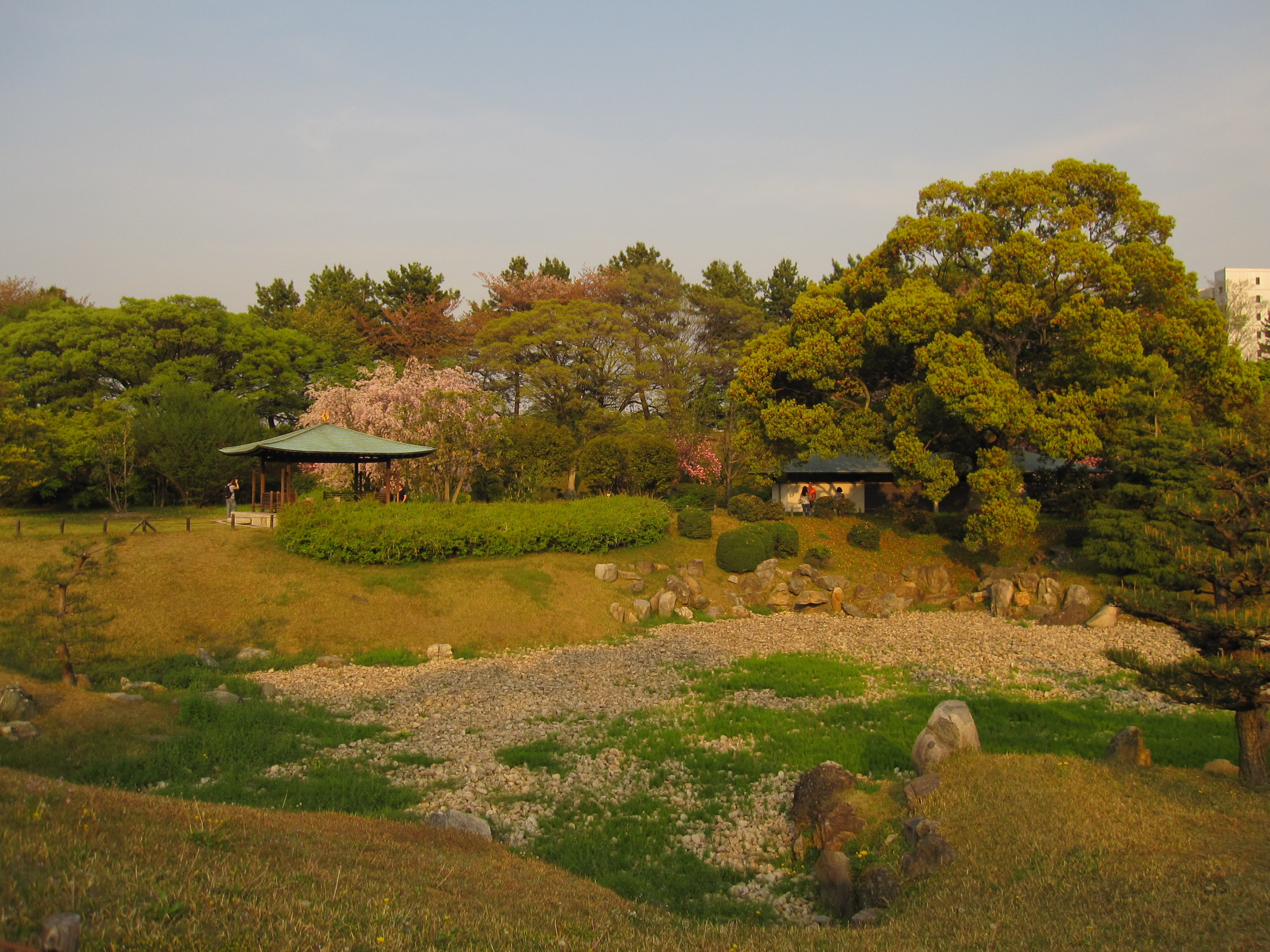
South Pond

In the historic Oshiro Oniwa Ezu drawing of the old castle garden a pond in the south (南池) is depicted with a large boat-shaped stone on the northern shore and an island of rocks in the middle. In an excavation survey, the large boat-shaped stone was not found, but it is believed that the island lies under three rocks that can be seen in the pond. The original pond is believed to have been deep, surrounded by sturdily piled rocks, and exceptionally large in scale, much larger than depicted in the drawing. Studies by the government are existing to restore this area back to its original appearance including water restoration.

== Ofukemaru ==
Formerly a marsh located on the northern edge of the Nagoya Plateau, the Ofukemaru (御深井丸) is said to have been reclaimed with pine and many other trees at the time of the castle's construction. It is also known as the Fukaimaru.

Necessary arms and ammunition, in addition to those the retainers had in their own possession, were stored in the facilities called Ozutsu-gure, Tezutsu-gura, Migaki-gura, and Ana-gura. A Shio-gura (salt storehouse) was located in the eastern corner. The warehouses have almost all disappeared; in their place some teahouses were constructed after 1945.

=== Nogi Warehouse ===
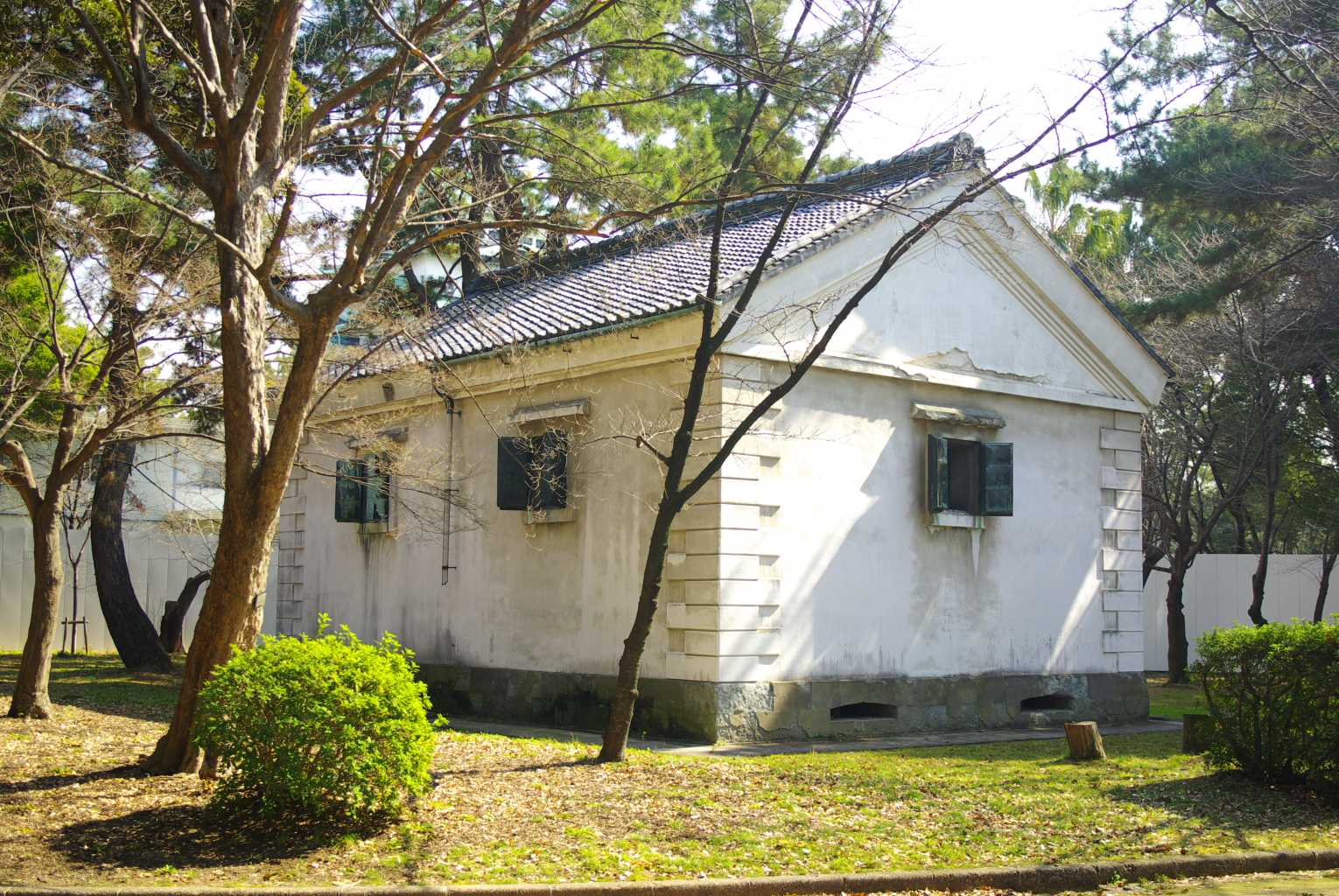
Nogi Warehouse

After the deployment of a garrison of the Imperial Army in 1872, the whole Sannomaru enceinte of the castle was placed under their control in 1874. The warehouse was probably constructed in 1880 (Meiji 13) as an army ammunition depot. It was named after General Nogi Maresuke, who was posted to Nagoya during the early Meiji era (1868–1912). It is the only warehouse that has survived in the Ofukemaru.

This warehouse is a one-story brick building with white plastered walls, small windows on the side, and a Japanese-styled tiled roof. Its size is 89.25 square metres: 12.28 metres from east to west, 8.6 metres from north to south, and 7.68 metres in height. The size of the ancillary gunpowder depot is 13.12 square metres. The building is characterised by its arched entrance, underfloor area, and white-coloured masonry plaster at the corners of the building. The doors are covered with copper sheets, and there are four small windows on the sides. The entrance originally had a stone porch and wooden roof (庇 Hisashi).

Although the Honmaru Palace was destroyed during World War II, the screen and ceiling paintings were undamaged because they were stored in this warehouse. It is a Registered Tangible Cultural Property.

=== Northwest Turret ===
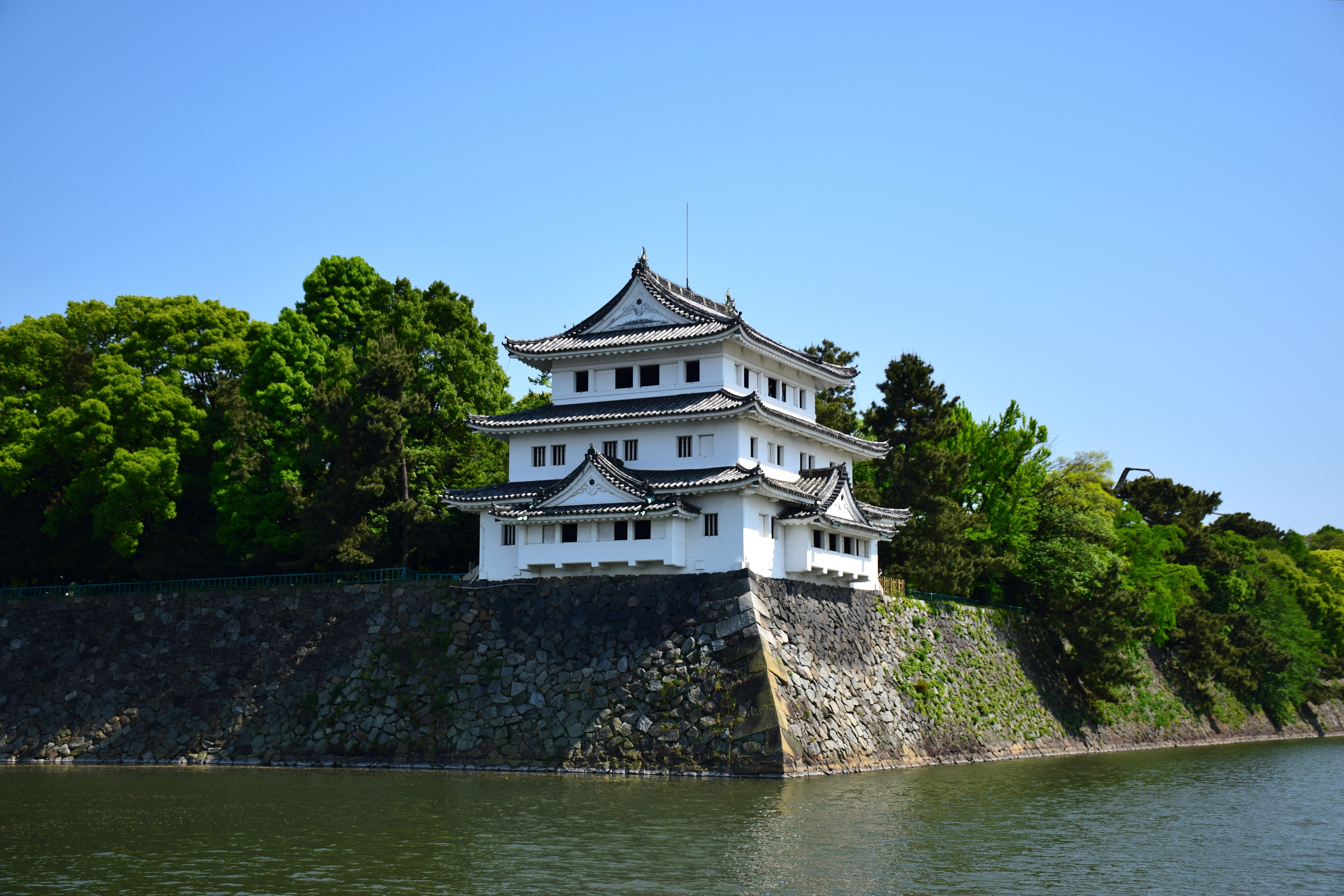
Northwest Turret

Also called Inui turret, the northwest turret is a three-storey structure with a roof at each level. The top layer, designed in the irimoya style, is covered with tiles. Many materials were taken from previous structures in Kiyosu Castle to construct this tower; it is therefore also called the Kiyosu turret. It is designated an important cultural asset.

Projections on the first-storey outer walls facing north and west are trapdoors from which stones could be dropped on attacking forces. They are disguised with gabled roofs. Unlike other corner turrets that still exist, the northwest turret also has gables on the east and south facing inside, thus projecting an image of balance and stability. Unlike the turrets of the Honmaru that have three floors but from the outside appear to only have two due to the number of roofs (a feature called Nijūsankai 二重三階), this turret has three roofs for three floors (Miesankai 三重三階).

=== "Cormorant's Neck" moats ===
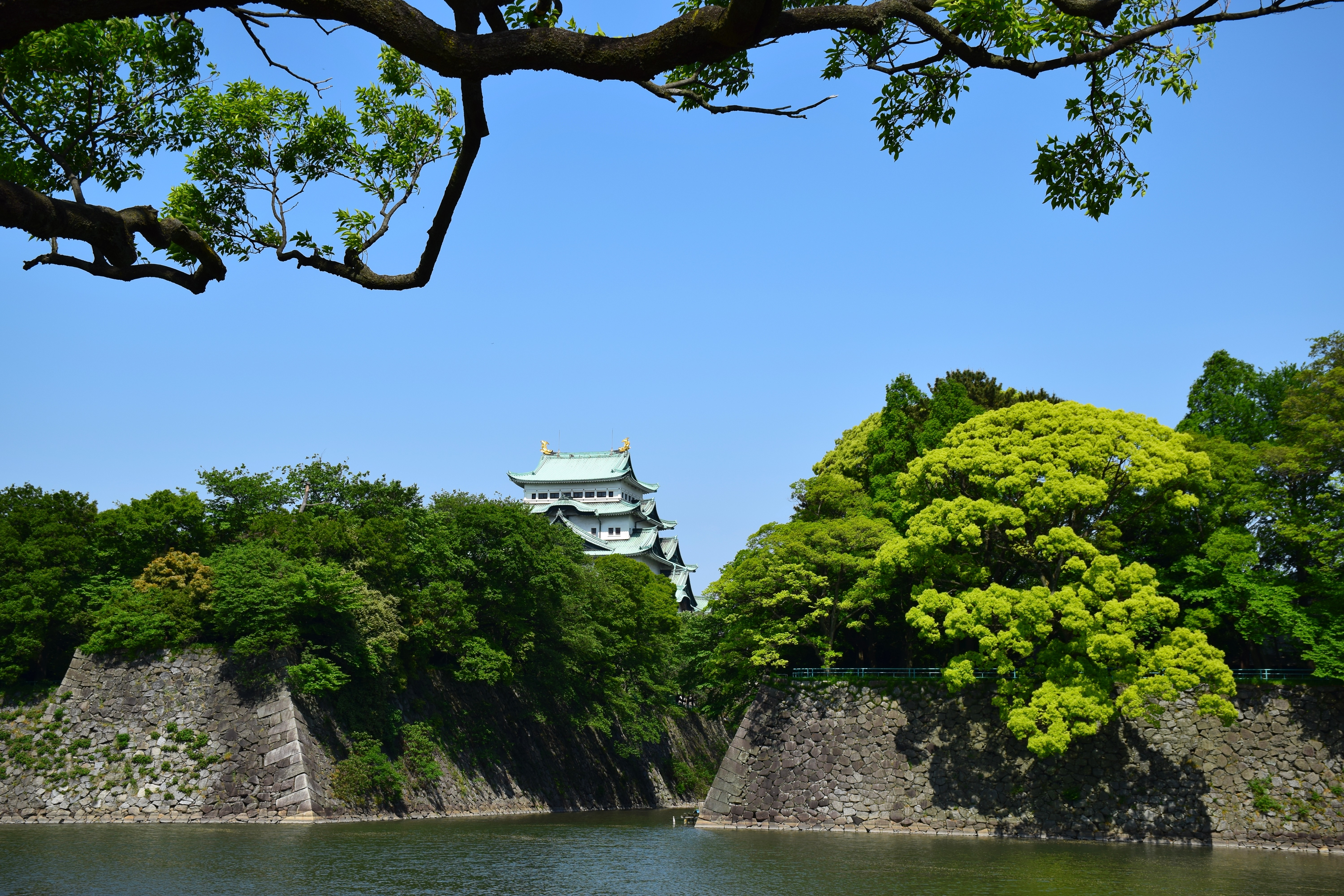
Main keep and "Cormorant's Neck" moat between Ofukemaru (left) and Nishinomaru

In places like the Ofukemaru and Nishinomaru Palaces the moat comes close to the castle wall. This was done to increase the defendability of the castle. This design is called the cormorant's neck because it is so long and thin. Five of these cormorant-neck shaped moats still exist throughout the castle area.

=== Kinjō-en ===
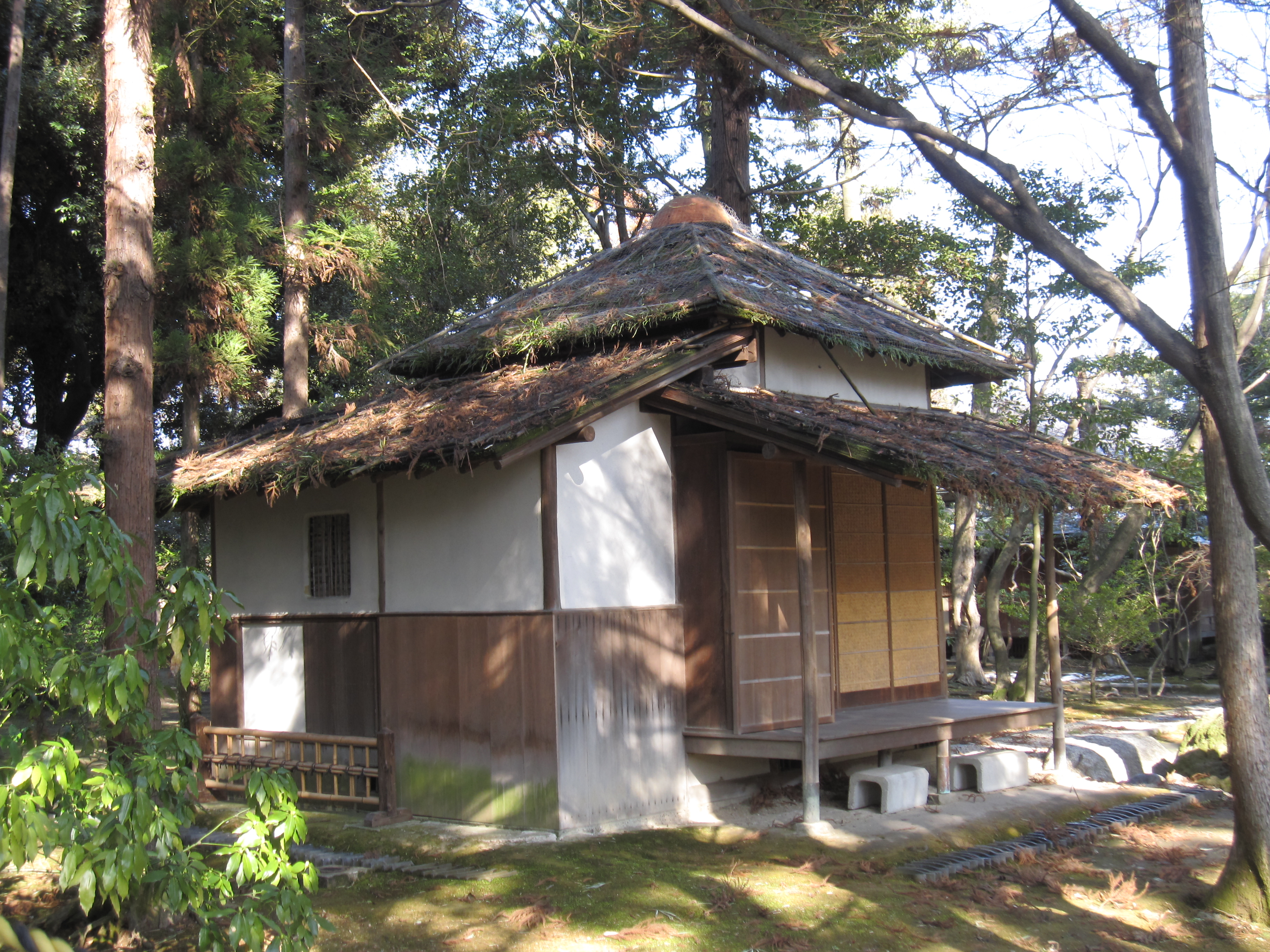
Oribe-dō tea house, dedicated to the memory of Lord Furuta Oribe (1544–1615)

The area close to the main keep to the north was designated for tea houses (chashitsu) starting in 1949. Named Kinjō-en (金城苑 "Golden Castle Garden") is consists of a number of tea houses and structures that continue the tradition of tea in the castle.

Normally the houses are used for chakai tea ceremony gatherings, haiku gatherings and so on. The area is open to the public only twice a year. The houses are built in the traditional architectural style of tea houses with accompanying gardens.

Sarumen Chaseki (猿面茶席), formerly a National Treasure, was reconstructed in this place in 1949 (Shōwa 24). The adjacent Bōgaku Chaseki (望嶽茶席) meaning "gazing towards the peak" or "viewing the mountain" received its name because Mount Ontake and its surrounding mountains could be viewed from this position. Together both form one compound structure.

The shoin (書院) main hall that was designed by Morikawa Kanichirō (森川勘一郎, 1887－1980), a regional tea master and expert on ancient culture. It contains a 10-tatami, an eight tatami and a five tatami room. The long girder in the front corridor was originally used as a flagpole when Emperor Showa visited Nagoya Castle on the way to his enthronement in 1928.

Yūin Chaseki (又隠茶席) is a copy of the one built by Sen no Rikyū's grandson, Sen no Sōtan (1578-1658). It was built during the An'ei years (1772-1780) and relocated to the castle. The name originated from the fact that Sōtan first built Konnichi-an (今日庵) and later built a new seat and retired to Yūin chaseki.

Oribe-dō (織部堂) is dedicated to the memory of Lord Furuta Oribe (1544–1615), a samurai warrior who served all three unifiers, and who was also an aesthete who developed Oribe ware and spread the practice of tea in Nagoya. The memorial hall was constructed in 1955.

Close to the tea houses is the Ofukemaru exhibition hall (御深井丸展示館) built in traditional style that houses various rotating exhibition on local arts, crafts and culture.

== Ofuke-niwa ==
North of the Ofukemaru across the moat was a large garden area with a lotus pond and smaller buildings called Ofuke-niwa (御深井庭) or Ofuke-oniwa (御深井御庭). A kiln was located in the Ofuke garden starting around 1670 where Ofukei ware, related to Seto ware, was produced. Another ceramic ware produced on an island is called Hagiyama ware. Both are classified as Oniwa-yaki (garden ware).

The southern part of the garden had three tea houses and smaller pavilions, while the northern half consisted of agricultural rice fields.

This area today is the Meijō Park.

== Sannomaru ==
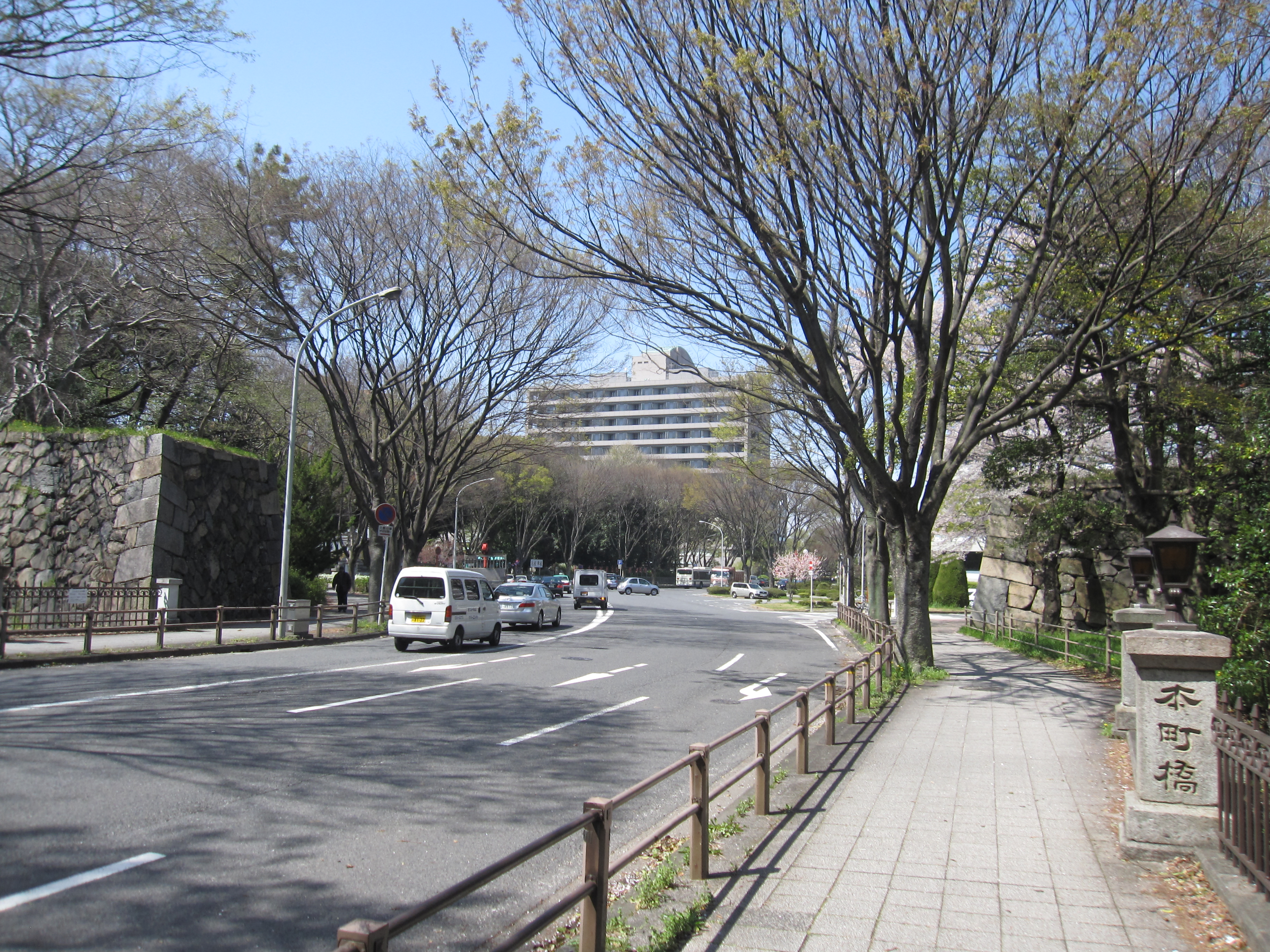
Remains of the Honmachi Gate (本町門) at the Sannomaru enceinte

The southern and easternmost part of the castle complex was the third enceinte Sannomaru (三の丸), which formed the border to the town. It was surrounded by moats, stone walls and had five gates from east to west the Shimizu-mon (清水門), Higashi-mon (東門) or Higashi Ōtemon (東大手門), Honmachi-mon (本町門), Misono-mon (御園門), and the Habashita-mon (巾下門).

The northern part of the Sannomaru consisted of a number of shrines and temples to protect the castle, especially from east to west the Tennōsha (天王社), the Tōshō-gū (東照宮), along the Taitokuin-den (台徳院殿), the Taiyūin-den (大猷院殿), and the Genyūin-den (厳有院殿). The Tennōsha was dedicated to Susanoo-no-Mikoto, the Tōshō-gū to Tokugawa Ieyasu, the first shōgun of the Tokugawa shogunate, the Taitokuin-den to Tokugawa Hidetada, the second shōgun, the Taiyūin-den to Tokugawa Iemitsu, the third shōgun, and the Genyūin-den to Tokugawa Ietsuna, the fourth shōgun.

The main part of the Sannomaru south of the shrines consisted of residences of important retainers. None of the residences survived into the modern era. The former vestibule of the Shimizu (志水家) residence was however saved and relocated to Jōshin as the main gate of the house of the Oya family. The Fushin-tei tea house, formerly in the Ninomaru, was also relocated to the garden of the house.

A number of stone basis of the entry gates and moats are still extant. The area is now occupied by governmental buildings. On the eastern side the Higashi Ōte Station is named after the site of the nearby Higashi Ōtemon (東大手門). The road around the moats is the Sotobori-dōri (Outer Moat Road).

Located further south just outside of the Sannomaru was the Meirindō (明倫堂). This Confucian school was established in 1783 under the 9th lord of Owari Province, Tokugawa Munechika (1733-1799), as a school for clan retainers and officials. The school closed in 1871. The hall however was relocated and became the main hall of the Eishō-ji (永照寺) in Hashima, Gifu during the Meiji era.

The eastern part of the Sannomaru contained the Sannomaru Oyakata auxiliary residences of the Owari lords. The area was converted in the Meiji era to military grounds and later given to housing and Nagoya Medical Center.

Located in the area are the subway stations such as Nagoyajo Station to the south and Meijō Kōen Station to the north. Nagoyajo Station's exit 7 is constructed as a Kōrai-mon.

== Sacred landscape ==
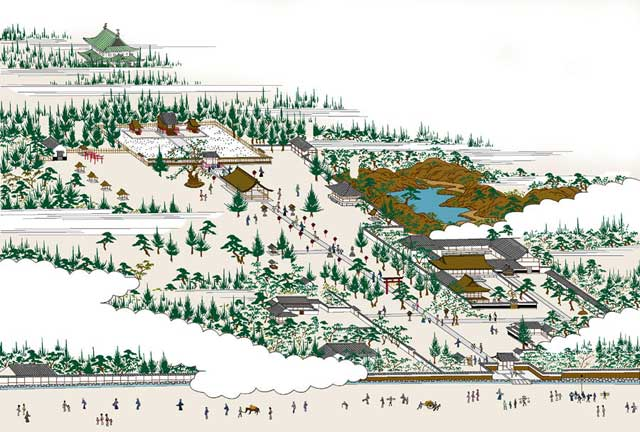
Depiction of the Tennōsha, from the Owari meisho zue, Edo period

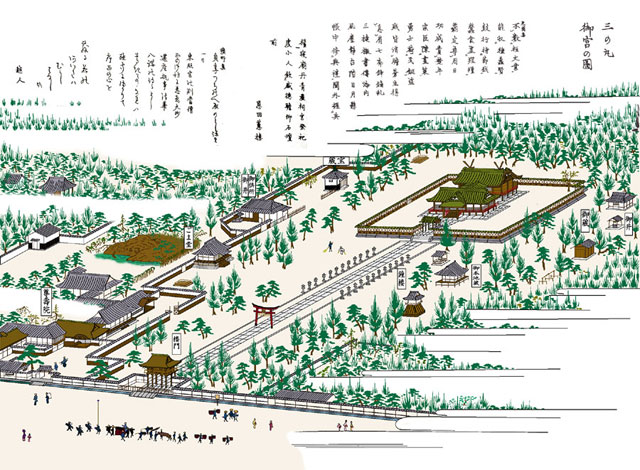
Depiction of the Tōshō-gū, from the Owari meisho zue

The castle formed part of a broader religious and political landscape integrating Shinto and Buddhist institutions. Within the Sannomaru precinct, the principal guardian shrine was the Tennōsha (天王社), later known as Nagoya Shrine (那古野神社), which enshrined Gozu Tennō, a deity subsequently identified with Susanoo-no-Mikoto. The shrine functioned as the primary tutelary shrine (鎮守社, chinju) of the castle and was historically associated with its protective spiritual role.

In addition to this local protective cult, the Tokugawa established Nagoya Tōshō-gū, a shrine dedicated to the deified Tokugawa Ieyasu (Tōshō Daigongen). This shrine was originally constructed within the castle's Sannomaru in 1619 and served to connect the site to the broader network of Tōshō-gū shrines across Japan, including Nikkō Tōshō-gū.

The Tennōsha held particular importance within the sacred landscape of the castle because it represented the primary layer of spatial and communal protection. As a shrine dedicated to Gozu Tennō it belonged to a widespread class of "Tennō shrines" associated with the prevention of epidemics, fires, and other calamities affecting urban populations. Such shrines were commonly established as guardian deities (鎮守, chinju) of castle towns, reflecting ancient beliefs linking social order and environmental stability to the proper veneration of protective kami. In the case of Nagoya Castle, the Tennōsha functioned not only as the immediate spiritual protector of the castle precincts but also as the tutelary deity of the surrounding castle town (城下町), integrating political authority with ritual protection at the local level.

This role distinguished it from Tōshō-gū, which expressed dynastic legitimacy through the deification of Tokugawa Ieyasu. While the Tōshō-gū linked Nagoya symbolically to the Tokugawa polity as a whole, the Tennōsha operated as the essential site-specific protector, ensuring the safety and continuity of the castle and its population.

The Tokugawa sacred system extended to mortuary temple complexes commemorating successive shoguns. Posthumous titles such as Taitokuin-den (台徳院殿, Tokugawa Hidetada), Taiyūin-den (大猷院殿, Tokugawa Iemitsu), and Genyūin-den (厳有院殿, Tokugawa Ietsuna) refer to Buddhist funerary cults maintained at small temples next to the two shrines. These were connected to places such as Zōjō-ji in Edo and Nikkō, forming part of a wider network of ritual and political authority.

During the Meiji era, the abolition of feudal domains and the policy of separating Shinto and Buddhism (shinbutsu bunri) led to the removal of key shrines from the castle grounds. The Tennōsha and Tōshō-gū were relocated in 1876, disrupting the original sacred configuration of the castle. As such, the removal of the Tennōsha from the castle grounds in the Meiji era was not only a physical relocation but also represented the loss of the castle's original ritual core.

=== Festivals ===
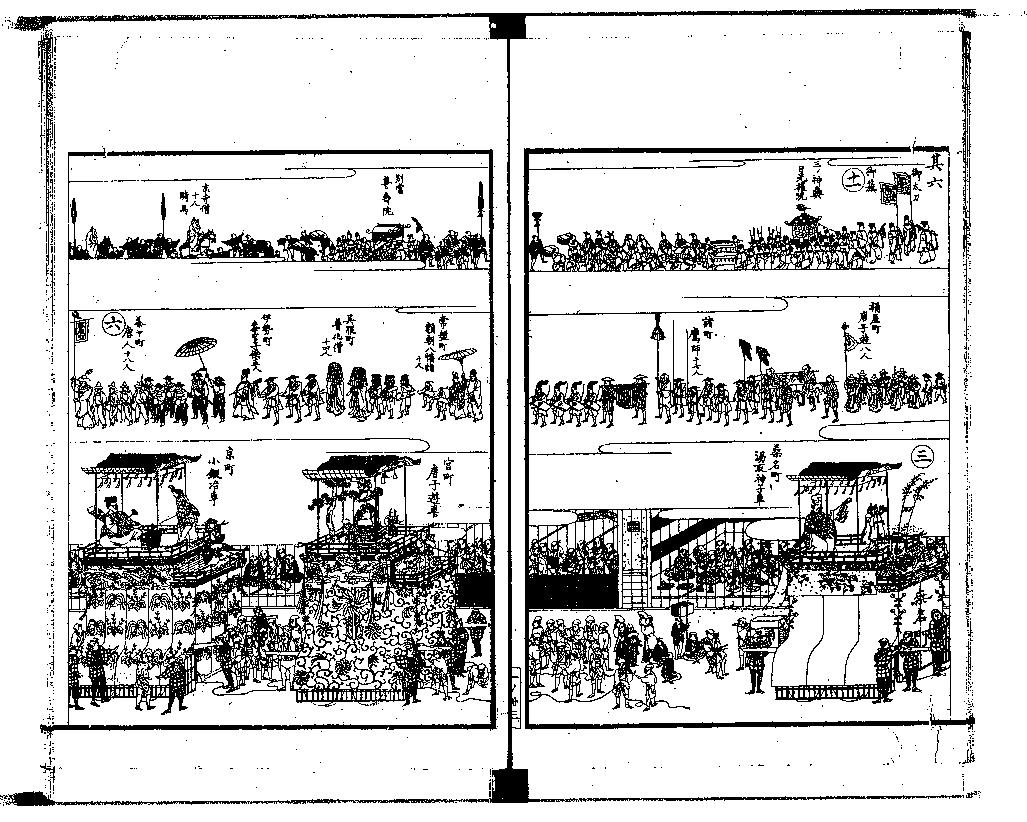
Depiction of the procession of floats at the Tōshōgū Festival (Owari Meisho Zue, Page 6 from Part 1, Volume 1)

During the Edo period, Nagoya Castle functioned not only as the political center of the Owari Domain but also as a focal point of the region's ritual and festival life. Unlike most Japanese castles, which remained largely separate from urban religious activity, Nagoya Castle was closely integrated into the ceremonial life of its surrounding castle town. While festivals in other castle towns were typically held outside the political center, Nagoya's principal festivals were directly linked to shrines located within or adjacent to the castle grounds, particularly the Tennōsha and the Tōshō-gū.

Several major festivals were associated with these shrines, most notably the Tōshōgū Festival (東照宮祭), held in honor of Tokugawa Ieyasu. This large-scale celebration featured elaborate processions, performances, and festival floats (山車, dashi). It became the most prominent festival in Nagoya and, before the Pacific War, was often referred to simply as the "Nagoya Festival."

In addition to the Tōshōgū Festival, the Tennō Festival associated with the Tennōsha and the Wakamiya Festival of Wakamiya Hachiman Shrine were also major annual events, collectively known as the "Three Great Festivals of Nagoya." These festivals structured the ceremonial life of the castle town and reflected the close relationship between religious practice, urban space, and political authority.

Festival processions were closely connected to the castle itself, with floats and portable shrines historically passing through or entering the castle precincts in order to perform rituals at the Tennōsha and Tōshō-gū. In some instances, festival floats were brought inside the castle grounds, emphasizing the site's role as both a political and ceremonial center. This degree of interaction between townspeople and castle space was relatively unusual, as castles generally functioned as restricted administrative complexes with limited public access. In Nagoya, however, the integration of castle, shrine, and procession created a unified ritual landscape.

Following the Meiji Restoration, the relocation of shrines from the castle grounds and the reorganization of religious institutions led to the decline of this integrated system. The destruction of many historical buildings and festival floats during the Pacific War further contributed to its disappearance. The modern Nagoya Festival, first held in 1955, is regarded as a civic successor that preserves elements of these earlier traditions in a secularized form.

== Plants and animals ==
The Ninomaru gardens and other areas such as the Ofukemaru have a wide variety of flora. In spring, Japanese cherry, wisteria, camellia, and peony bloom. In the summer it is iris, crape myrtle, plantain lily, and hydrangea; in autumn the confederate rose, Japanese quince and crape myrtle, and in winter the Japanese witch hazel, Japanese quince, wintersweet, and Japanese plum that bloom. During the summer, Sika deer can be observed grazing in the moats that are dry and covered with grass. Various birds, such as ducks and songbirds, inhabit the castle grounds as their sanctuary in the middle of the city.

=== Chrysanthemum exhibition ===
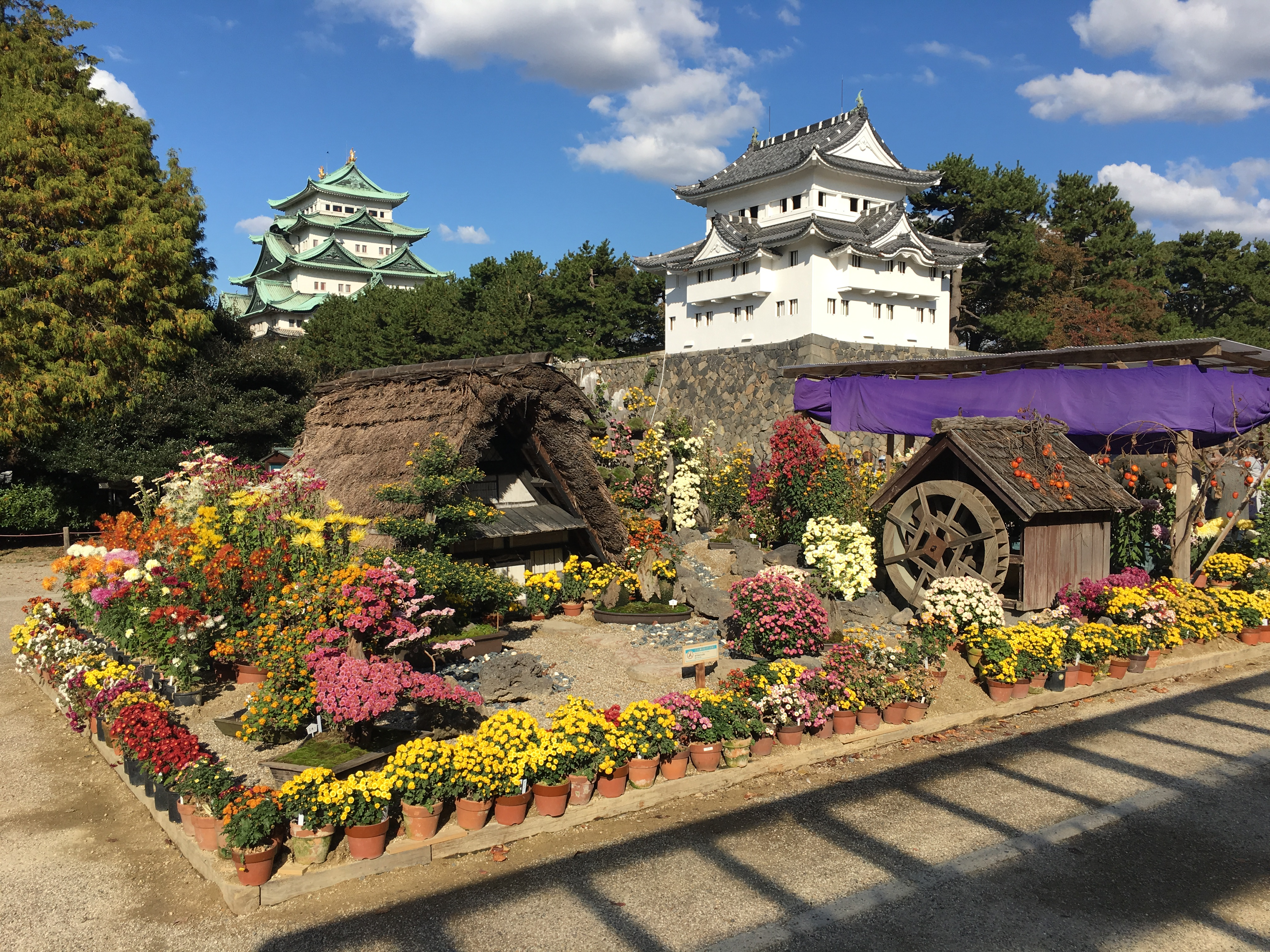
Nagoya Castle Chrysanthemum Competition 2018

The Nagoya Castle Chrysanthemum exhibition started after the end of World War II. Chrysanthemum cultivation began in Japan during the Nara and Heian periods (early 8th to late 12th centuries), and gained popularity in the Edo period. Many flower shapes, colours, and varieties were created. The way the flowers were grown and shaped also developed, and chrysanthemum culture flourished. The event at the castle has become a tradition for the city. With three categories, it is one of the largest events of its kind in the region by both scale and content. The first category is the exhibition of cultivated flowers. The second category is for chrysanthemum bonsai flowers, which are combined with dead pieces of wood to give the illusion of miniature trees. The third category is the creation of miniature landscapes.

== Kinshachi Yokocho ==
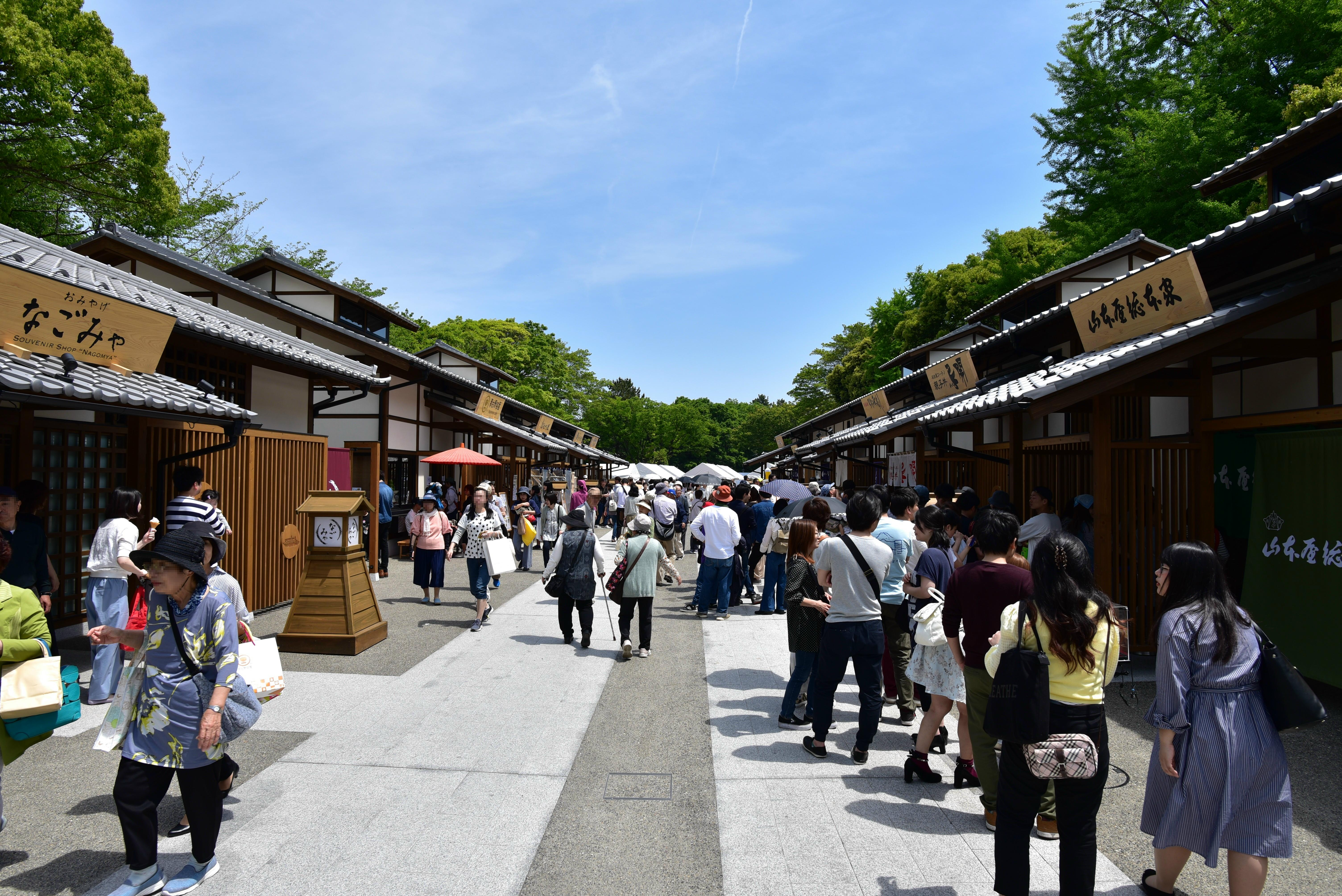
Kinshachi Yokocho

Kinshachi Yokocho (金シャチ横丁) is a commercial and cultural complex located at the base of the castle. Opened in 2018 as part of a redevelopment initiative by the city, it is designed to recreate the atmosphere of an Edo period castle town while promoting local culture and cuisine. The complex is situated immediately outside the castle’s main entrances, extending along the areas near both the main (Seimon) gate and the east gate, and occupies former sections of the castle’s Sannomaru precinct. It consists of two distinct zones—the Yoshinao Zone near the main gate, emphasizing traditional architecture and established regional dishes, and the Muneharu Zone near the east gate, featuring more modern interpretations of Nagoya’s culinary culture. Located directly adjacent to the castle walls, it serves both as a tourist facility and a symbolic revival of the historic castle town (城下町) that once surrounded the site.

== See also ==
- List of Owari Tokugawa residences
- List of Special Places of Scenic Beauty, Special Historic Sites and Special Natural Monuments
- List of foreign-style castles in Japan
- Danbara Kofun
- Sasayama Castle

== Literature ==
- Benesch, Oleg. "Castles and the Militarisation of Urban Society in Imperial Japan", Transactions of the Royal Historical Society, Vol. 28 (Dec. 2018), pp. 107-134.
- De Lange, William (2021). An Encyclopedia of Japanese Castles. Groningen: Toyo Press. pp. 600 pages. ISBN 978-9492722300.
- Jennifer Mitchelhill. Castles of the Samurai: Power and Beauty. Kodansha. 2004. ISBN 978-4770029546
- Motoo, Hinago (1986). Japanese Castles. Tokyo: Kodansha. pp. 200 pages. ISBN 0-87011-766-1.
- Schmorleitz, Morton S. (1974). Castles in Japan. Tokyo: Charles E. Tuttle Co. pp. 128–142. ISBN 978-0-8048-1102-6.
- Stephen Turnbull. Japanese Castles 1540–1640. Osprey Publishing. 2003. ISBN 978-1841764290
- Stephen Turnbull. Strongholds of the Samurai: Japanese Castles 250–1877. Osprey Publishing. 2009. ISBN 978-1846034138
