= Mita, Minato, Tokyo =

Mita 三田
- District
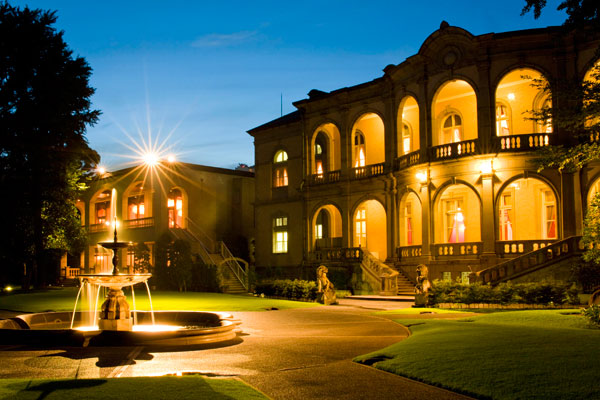
- Mitsui Tsunamachi Club in Mita

- Location of Mita in Minato ward, Tokyo
- Coordinates: 35°38′51″N 139°44′26″E
- Country: Japan
- City: Tokyo
- Ward: Minato
- Area: Shiba Area (1, 2, 3-chōme); Takanawa Area (4, 5-chōme)

Population (January 1, 2016)
  - Total: 18,760
- Time zone: UTC+9 (JST)
- Postal code: 108-0073
- Area code: 03

Mita (三田) is a district of Minato, Tokyo, Japan. It was once home to grand estates of several daimyo, and now is one of Tokyo's most expensive upscale residential districts; it is home to many artists, CEOs, and celebrities.

Mita is bordered by Higashi-Azabu on the north, Azabu-Jūban and Minami-Azabu to the west, and Shirokane and Takanawa to the south.

Mita is home to Keio University, Mita Hachiman Jinja, and the diplomatic missions of Kuwait, Italy, Hungary, Papua New Guinea, and Australia.

== Geography ==
Mita consists of five chōme:

- Mita 1-chōme and 5-chōme are low lands by Furu River and consist of a mix of both residential and commercial areas.
- Mita 2-chōme, once known as Mita Tsunamachi (三田綱町), is on high, elevated land and is a historically wealthy part of Mita, once home to grand estates of several Daimyo. Some of these estates remain to this day: the Tsunamachi Mitsui Club, Australian Embassy, and Italian Embassy are all on former Daimyo estates.
- Mita 3-chōme mostly consists of commercial buildings.
- Mita 4-chōme consists of many historic temples.

== Economy ==
The Yazaki Group has its corporate headquarters in the Mita-Kokusai Building (三田国際ビル, Mita Kokusai Biru) in Mita.

== Transportation ==
As a historically quiet, upscale, residential area, Mita does not have any train or subway stations within its borders. However, it is located near:

- Akabanebashi Station on the Toei Ōedo Line
- Azabu-juban Station on the Toei Ōedo Line and Tokyo Metro Namboku Line
- Mita Station on the Toei Mita Line and Toei Asakusa Line (Despite its name, Mita Station is not located in Mita, but in the neighboring Shiba district.)
- Shirokane-takanawa Station on the Tokyo Metro Namboku Line and Toei Mita Line
- Tamachi Station on the Yamanote Line and Keihin-Tōhoku Line

== Notable places in Mita ==
=== Slopes ===
Many roads up to the Mita plateau have named slopes of historical significance. Each is marked by a wooden post which explains the name.

- Hijiri zaka (聖坂) corresponds to the ancient Tōkaidō road (東海道). The slope's name changes between the top of Isarago zaka (伊皿子坂) and the Nihon enoki dori (二本榎通り).
- Gyoran zaka (魚藍坂) is a hill road in Mita 4-chōme. It reaches the promontory from Gyoranzaka Crossing which results from the summit in Isaragozaka.
- Katsura zaka (桂坂) (from katsura (桂; lit. 'katsura tree')) is a hill road which lies between Takanawa 2-chōme and 3-chōme. Its name possibly originates from the fact that ivy and vines historically covered the surface of this hill, though an alternate etymology says that a Buddhist priest who wore a wig (鬘, katsura) died along this slope suddenly on a return trip from Shinagawa.
- Zakuro zaka (石榴坂) is a hill road which crosses between Takanawa 3-chōme and 4-chōme. The street was probably named because there was a pomegranate tree (石榴, zakuro) in the middle of a slope a long time ago. The area has many hotels.
- Hebi zaka (蛇坂) (from hebi (蛇; lit. 'snake')) is a slope which is in Mita 4-chōme.
- Anzenji zaka (安全寺坂) is a hill road crossing between Mita 3-chōme and 4-chōme. The temple of Anzenji was built here in the Edo era.
- Hora zaka (洞坂; lit. 'cavernous slope') is a hill road in Takanawa 3-chōme. It is alternatively called Hora zaka (法螺坂; lit. 'conch shell slope')) and Bora zaka (鯔坂; lit. 'herring slope').
- Hiyoshi zaka (日吉坂) is a hill road which forms the border of Shirokane 2-chōme and 4-chōme. It goes from Meguro-dori in the southwest to Sakurada-dori in the northeast, and goes past the Kuwahara zaka (桑原坂) to the south. The name originates from the Noh actor Hiyoshi Kahei who lived nearby.
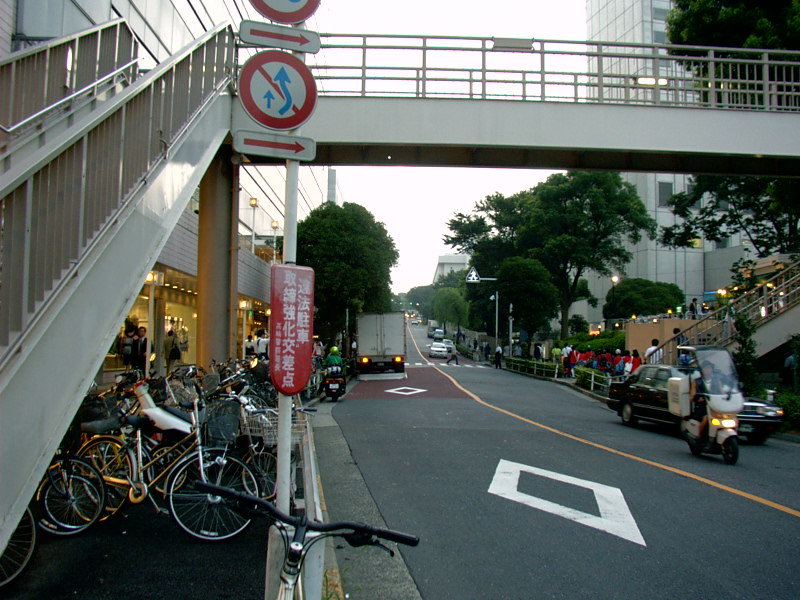
Zakuro zaka
(柘榴坂)

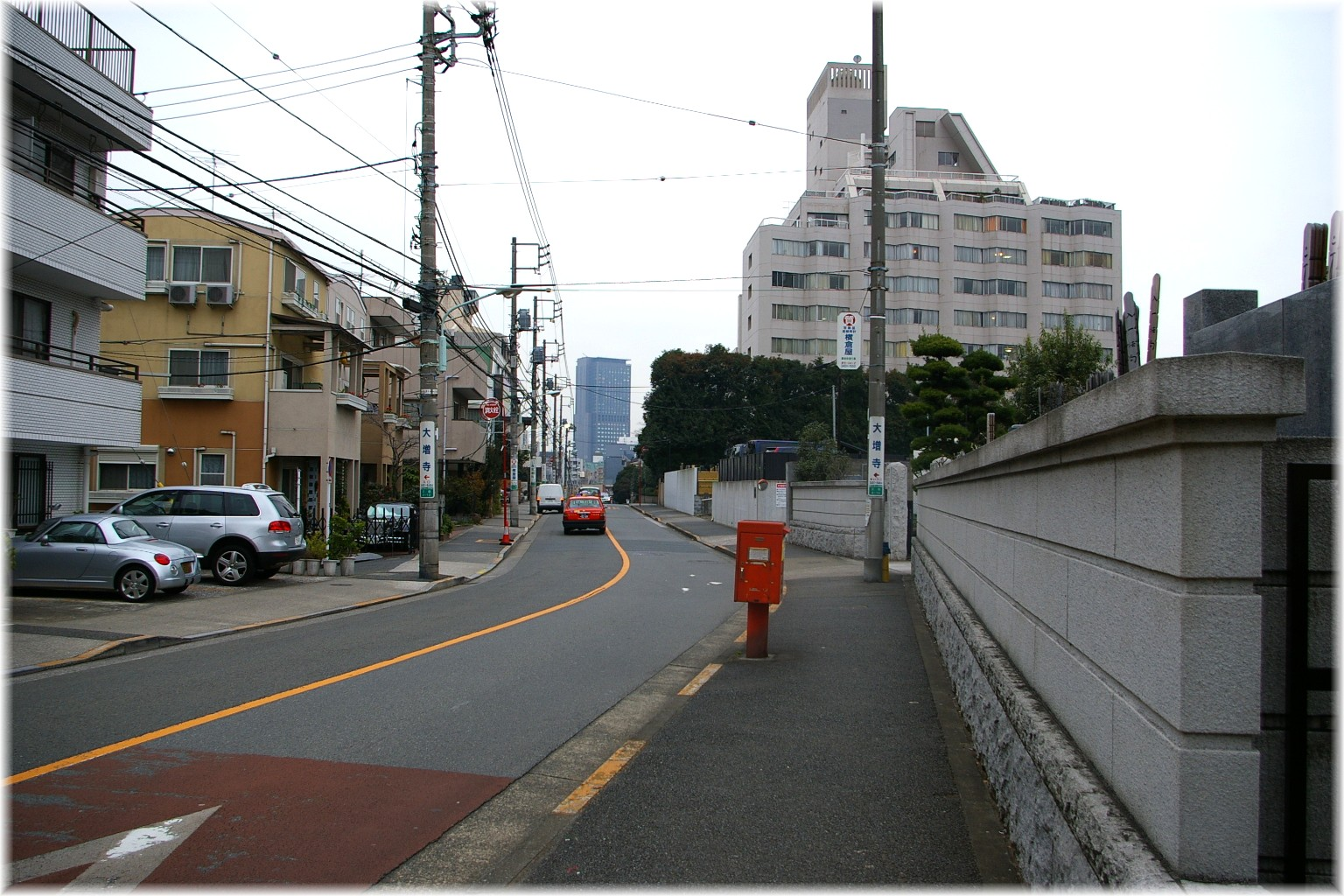
Hijiri zaka
(聖坂)

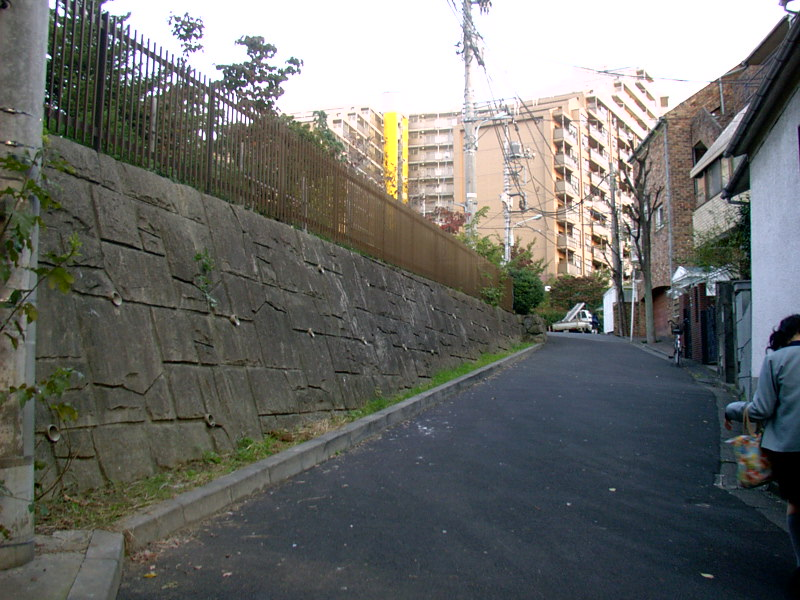
Yoshimi zaka
(葭見坂)

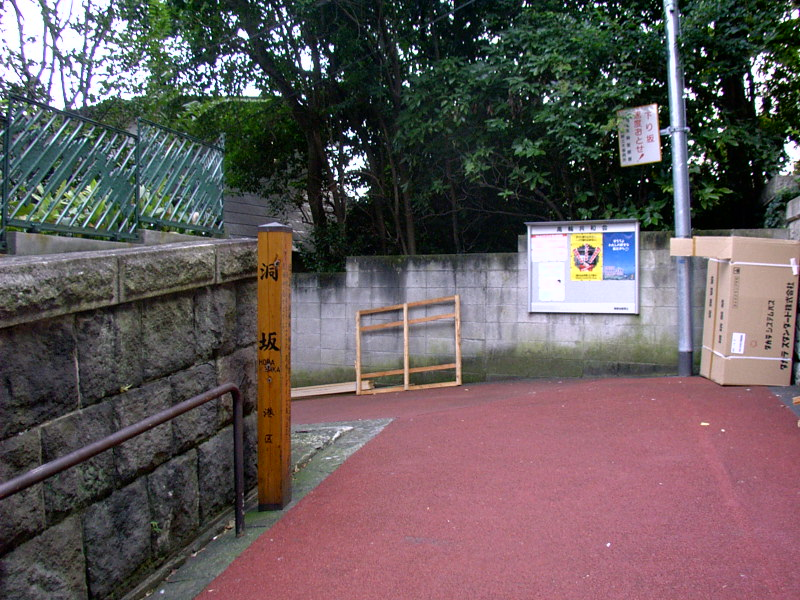
Top of Hora zaka

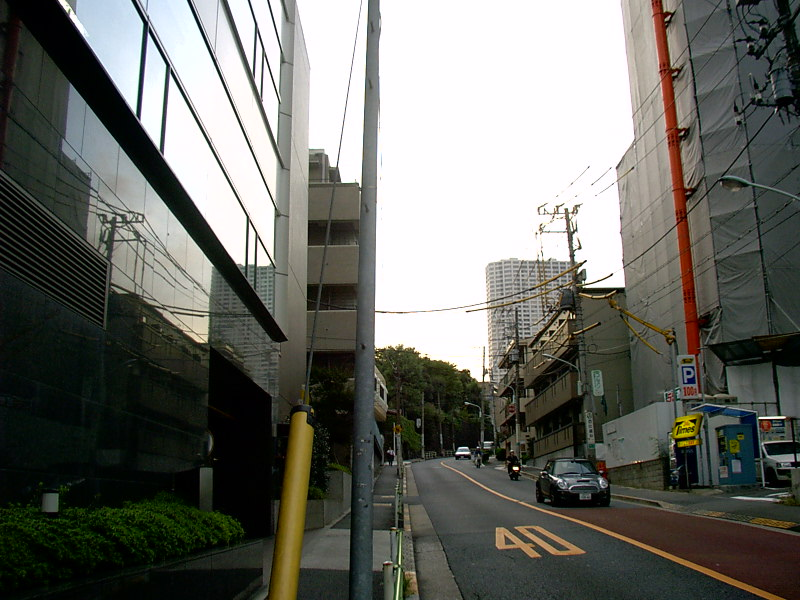
Katsura zaka

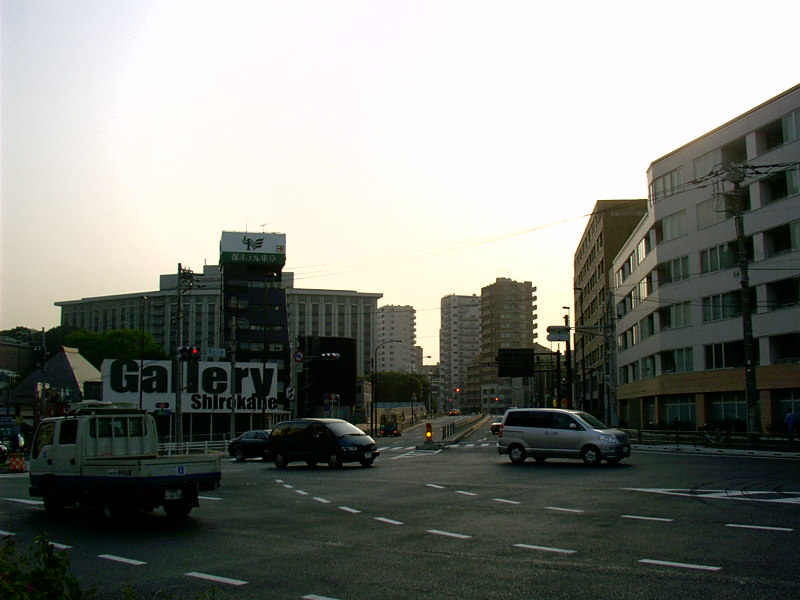
Hiyosi zaka

=== Shinto shrines and temples ===
In the early stages of the Edo period, the shōgun decided to extend Edo Castle and ordered temples around the castle to move to Mita. From this reason, there were many temples on the hill, especially in area named Tera machi (寺町). Shrines in the district date back to the Asuka period or Heian period.

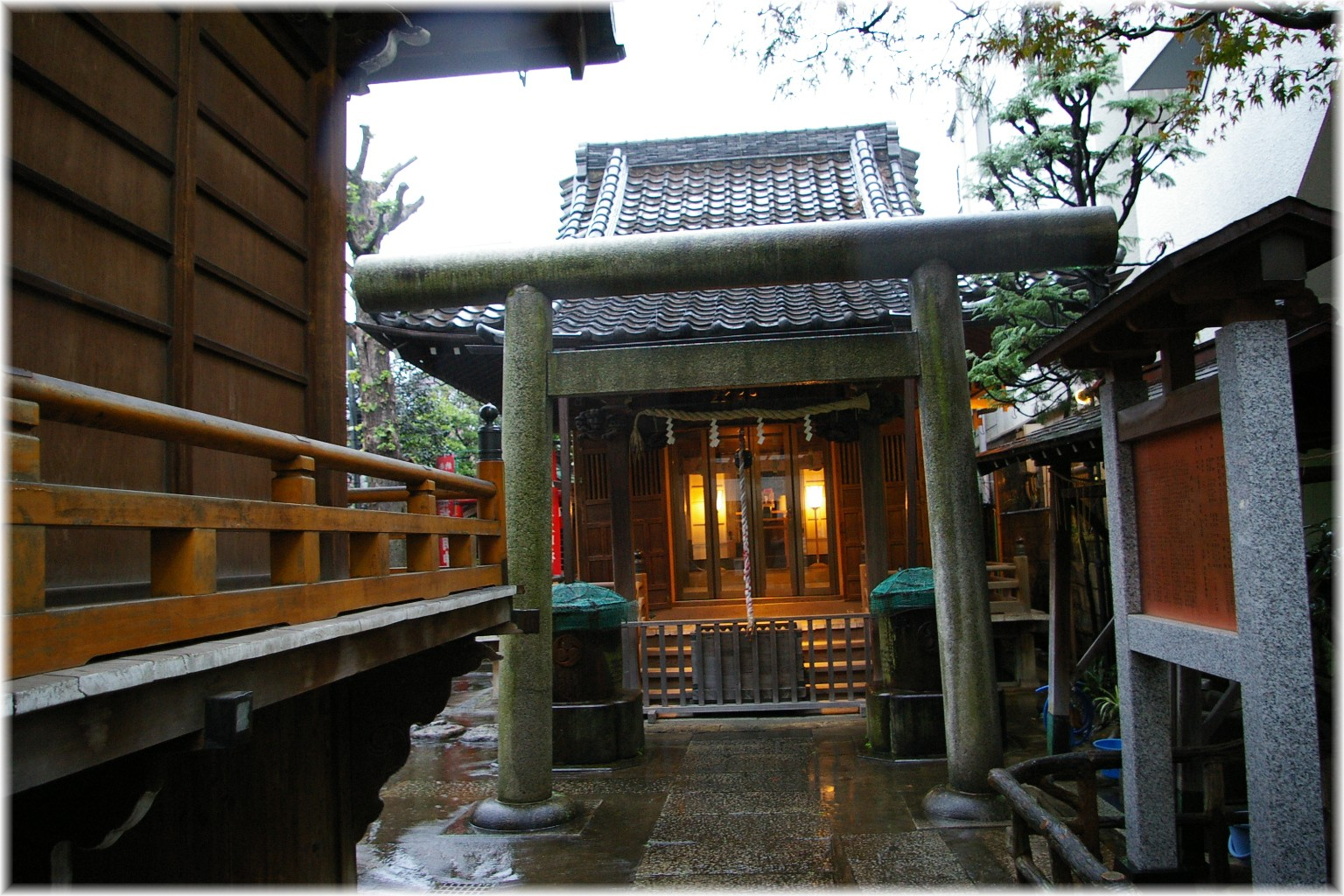
Maruyama Jinja
(丸山神社)

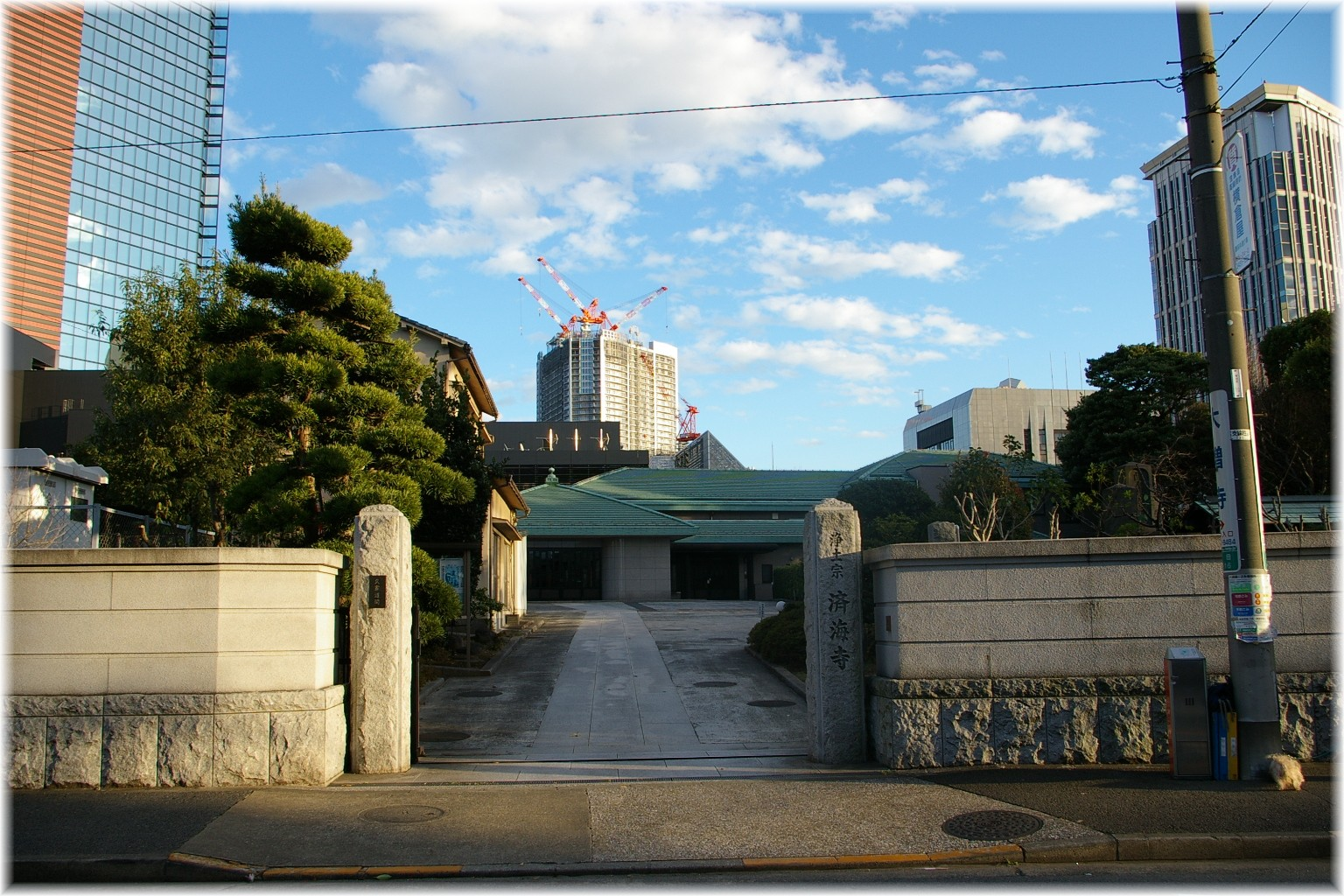
Saikai-ji
(済海寺)

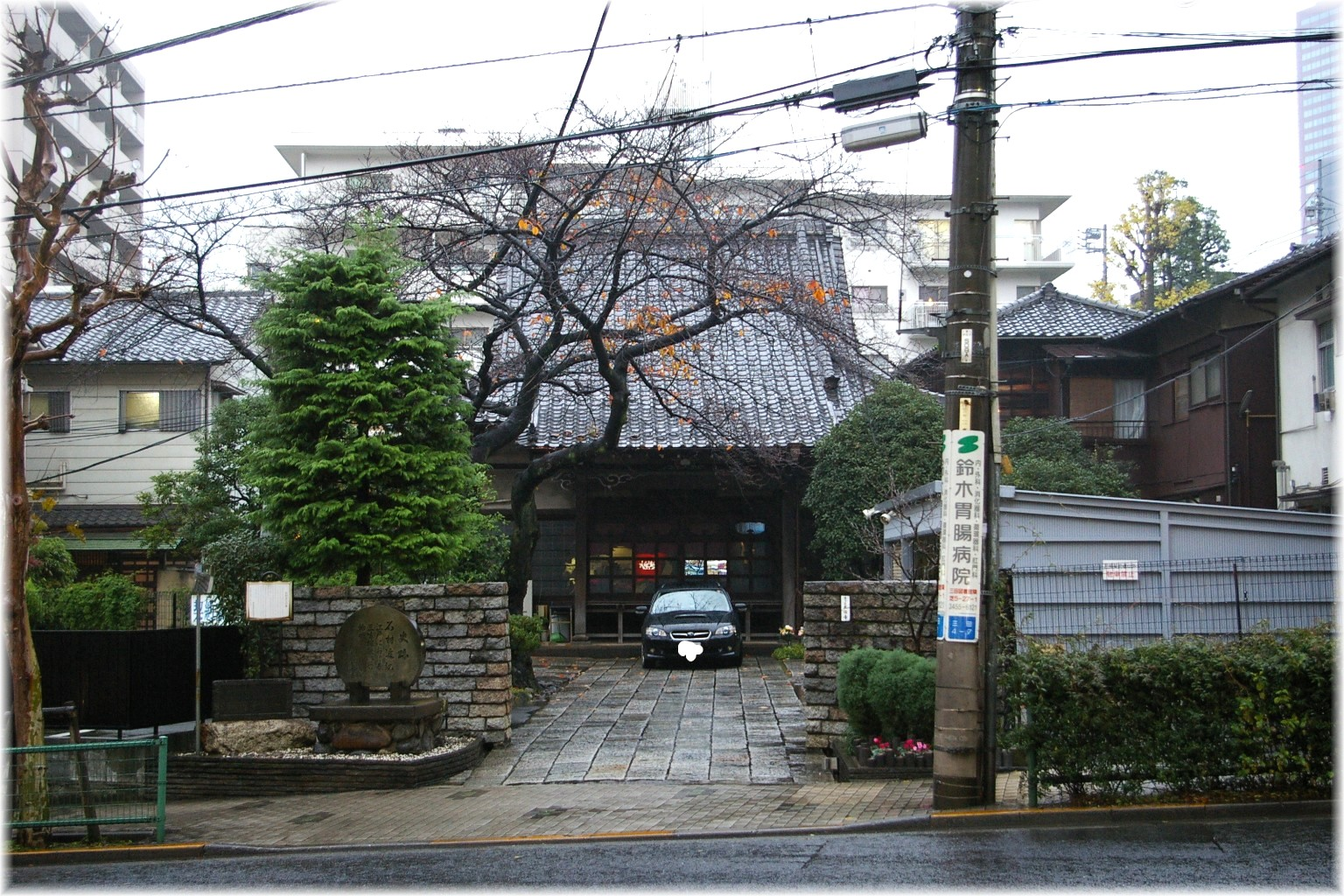
Daishin-ji
(大信寺)

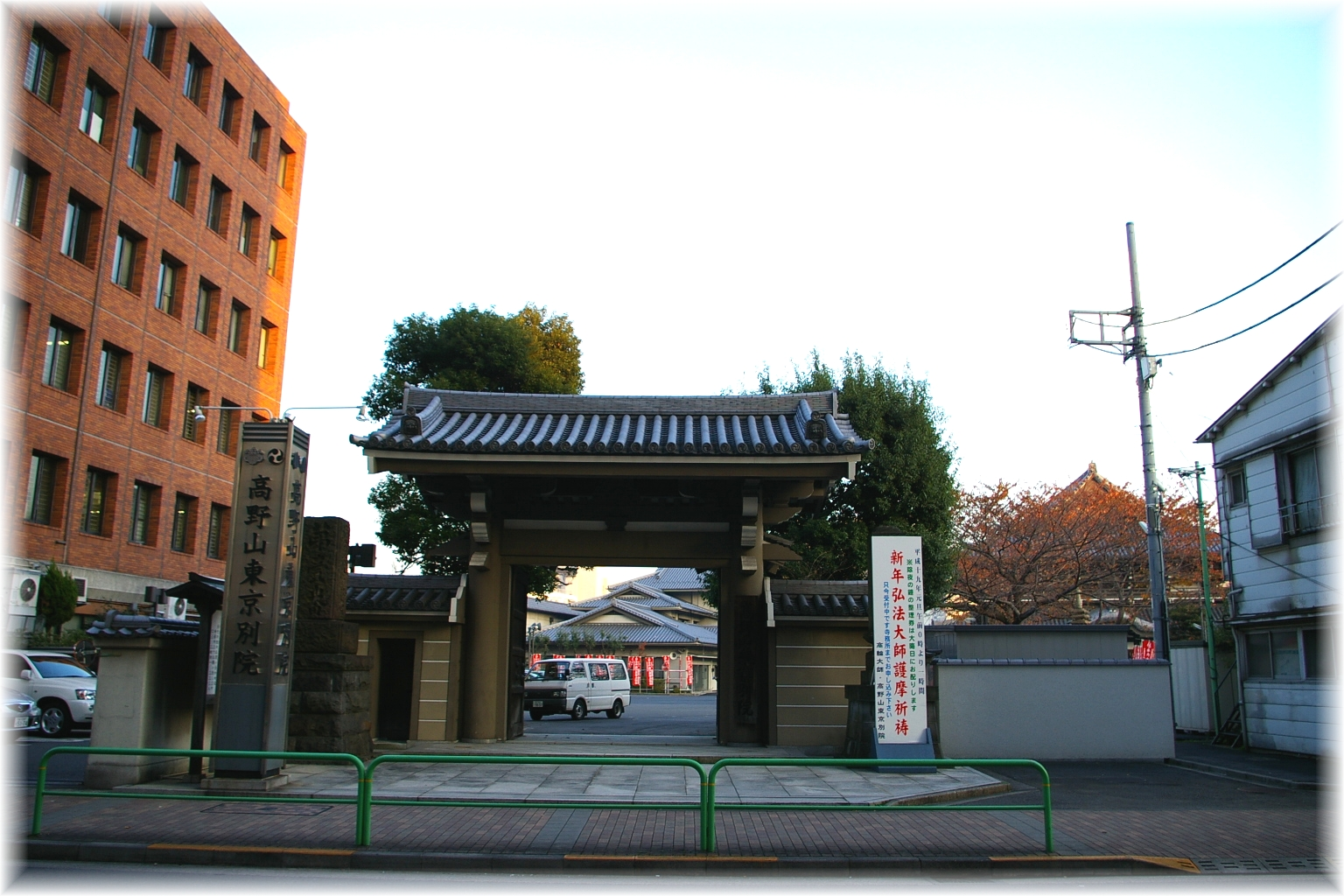
Koyasan Tokyo Betsuin
(高野山別院)

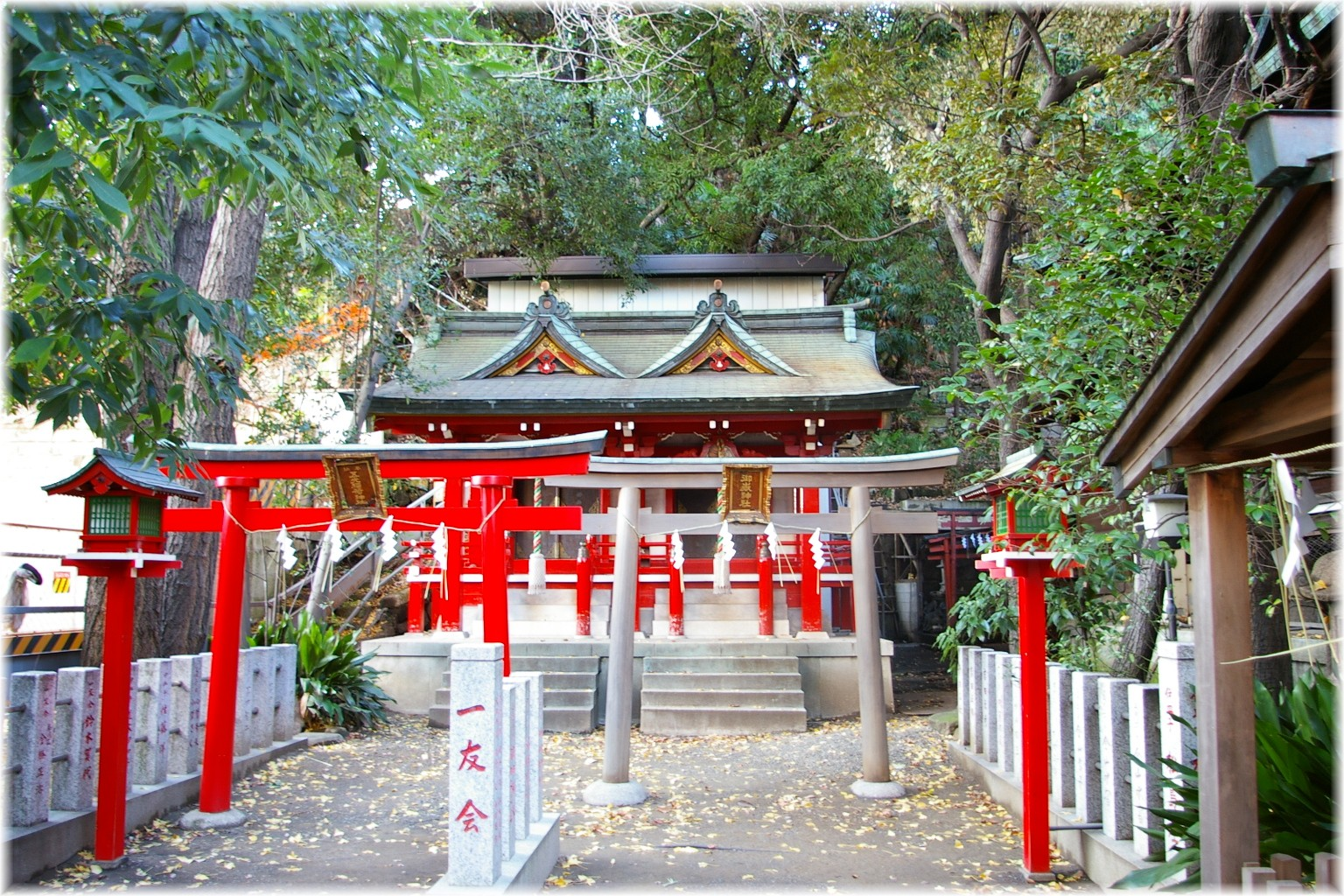
Mita Hachiman Jinja
(三田八幡神社)

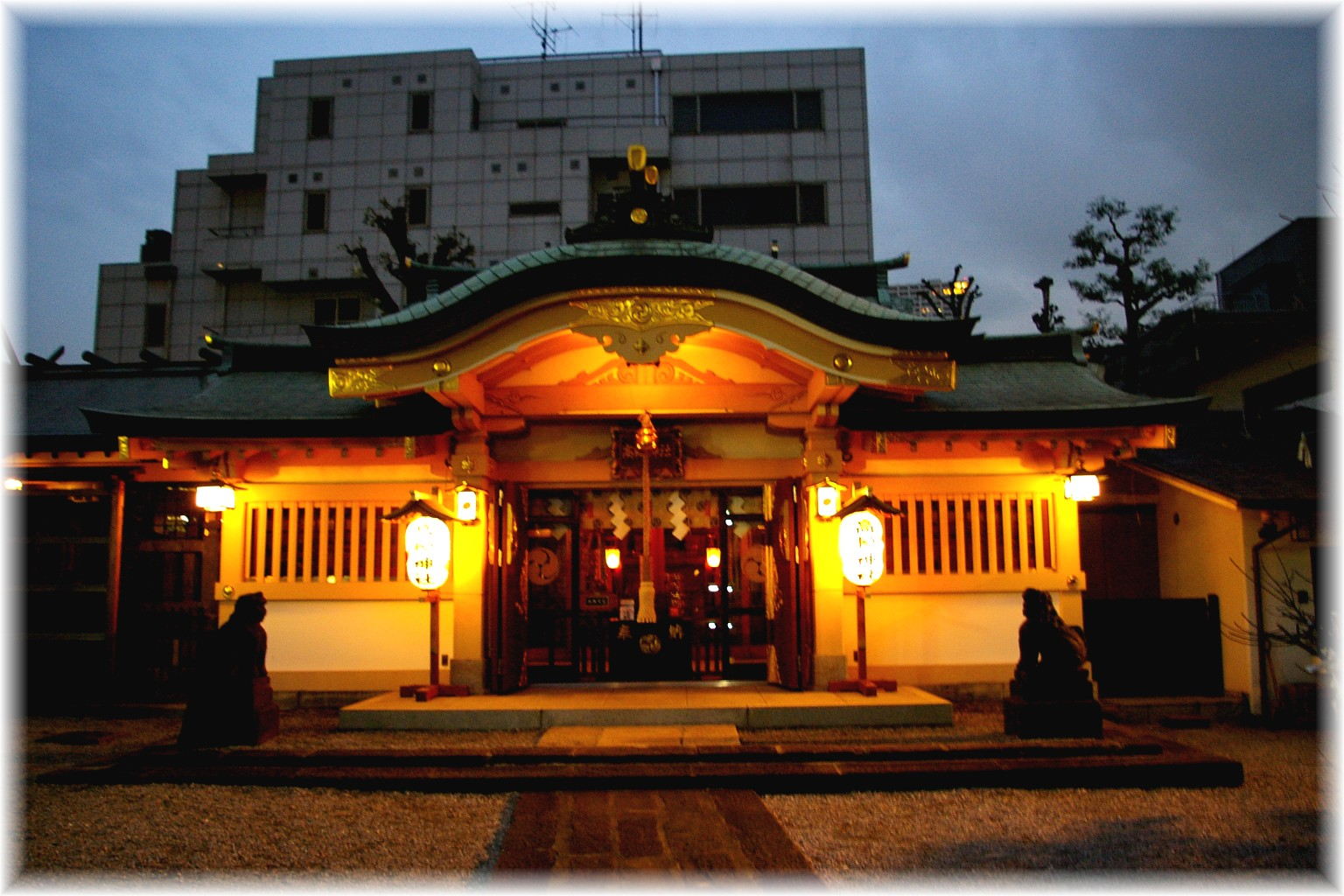
Takanawa jinjya
(高輪神社)

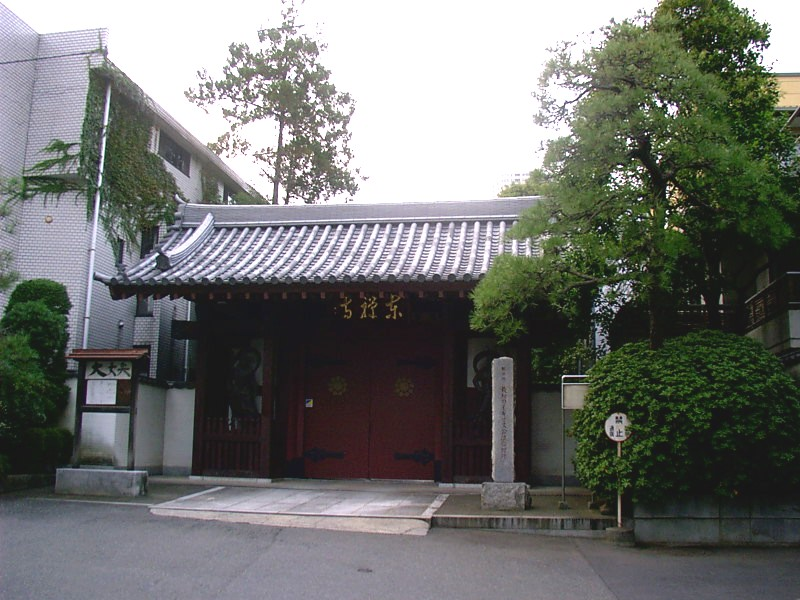
Tōzen-ji
(東禅寺)

=== Parks ===
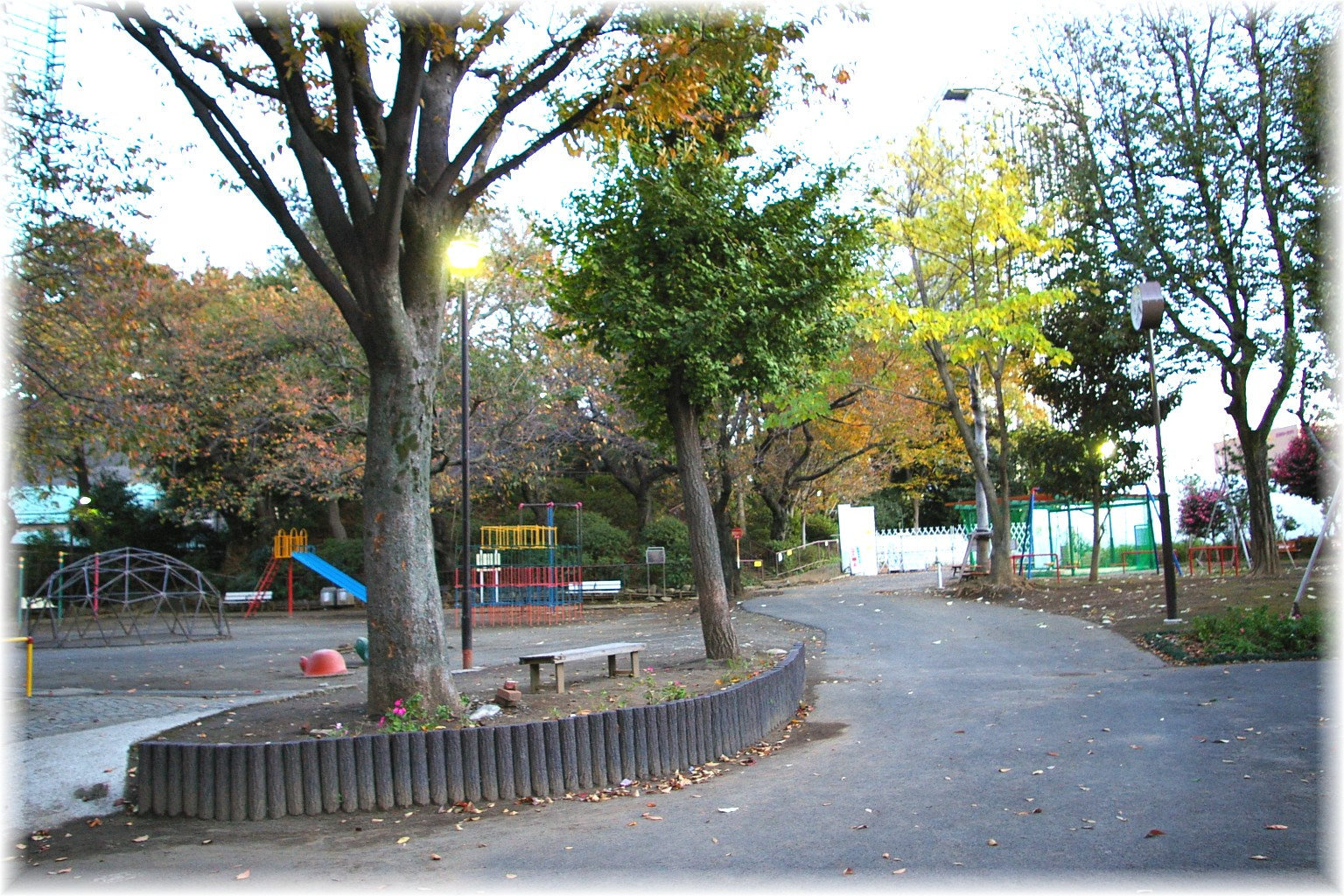
Kamezuka Kōen (亀塚公園)

In the Edo period, Mita was home to the estates of daimyō (most were tozama daimyō (外様大名; lit. 'non-Tokugawa daimyō')). During the Meiji era, the estates were sold to high-ranking government officials (顕官, kenkan) and nobility (華族, kazoku). Today, some estates have been converted into public parks.

- Mitadai Kōen (三田台公園)
- Toyouka-cho Jidou Yuuen (豊岡町児童遊園). Its former name is Toyooka Kōen (豊岡公園).
  - Children's park which exists in Mita 5-11-6 Minato, Tokyo, Japan. Its former name is Toyooka Kōen (豊岡公園).
  - Area: 191 m^{2} (2,060 sq ft)
  - Nearby subway station: Shirokane-takanawa (白金高輪)
  - Although a swing, sandbox, launching platform, box type swing, and drinking fountain once existed here, all except the drinking fountain have been removed.

=== Embassies ===
- Australian embassy
- Italian embassy

=== Universities ===
- Keio University

=== Tertiary schools ===
- Tokai University Junior College

=== Primary and secondary schools ===
Minato City Board of Education operates public elementary and junior high schools.

Mita 1–2 chōme are zoned to Akabane Elementary School (赤羽小学校), while Mita 3–5 chōme are zoned to Mita Elementary School (御田小学校). The entire district (1–5 chōme) is zoned to Mita Junior High School (三田中学校).

Full list of primary and secondary schools:

- Minato City Mita Junior High School (港区立三田中学校)
- Minato City Mita Elementary School (港区立御田小学校)
- Minato City Akabane Elementary School (赤羽小学校)
- Friends Girls Junior & Senior High School
- Tokai University Takanawadai Junior & Senior High School (東海大学付属高輪台高等学校・中等部)
- Takanawa Junior / Senior High School (高輪中学高等学校)
- Kindergarten Teacher Training College, Seitoku University (聖徳大学幼児教育専門学校)
- Laurus International School of Science Primary School
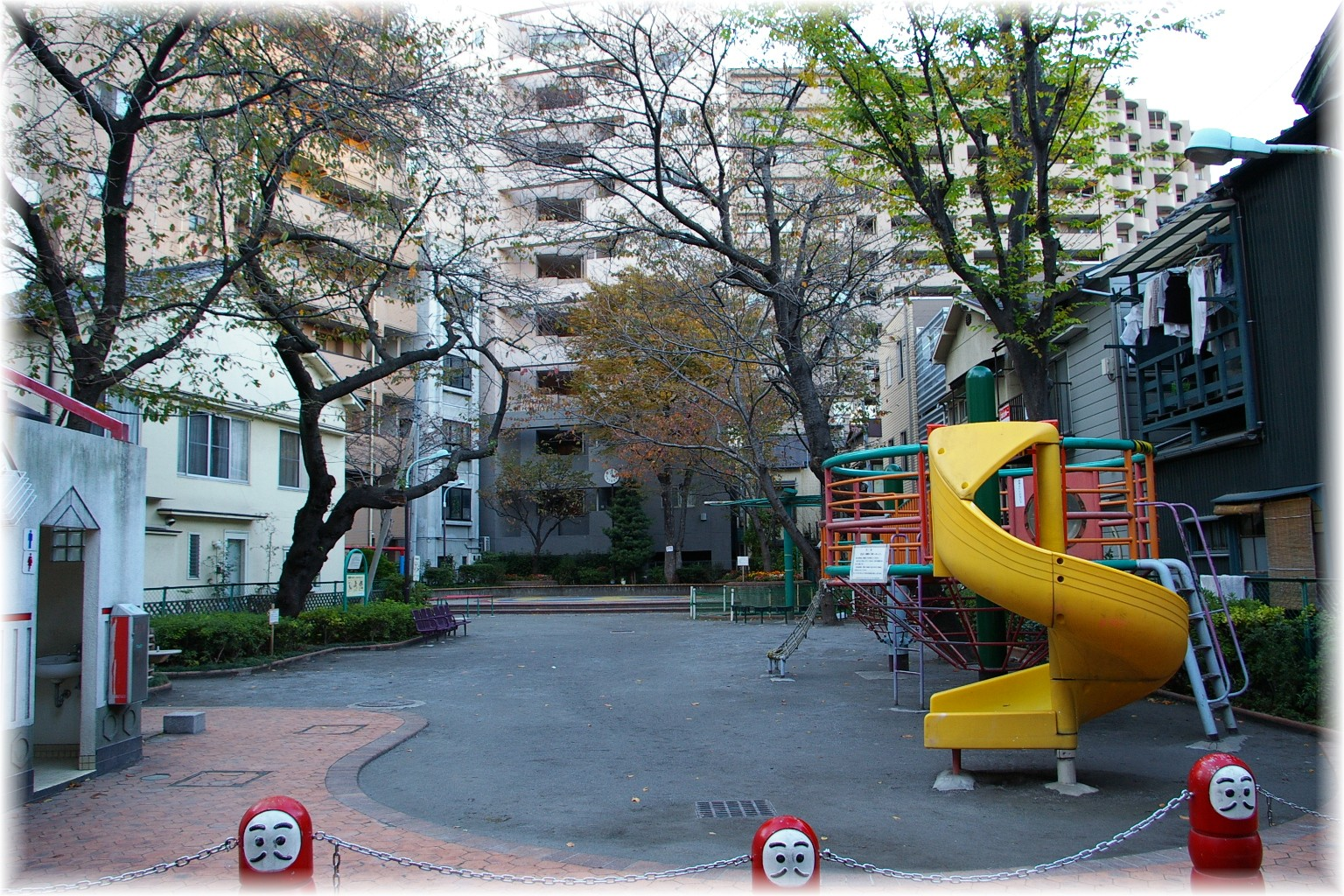
Mita Matsuzaka Children's Park
(松坂児童公園, Matsuzaka Jido Kōen)

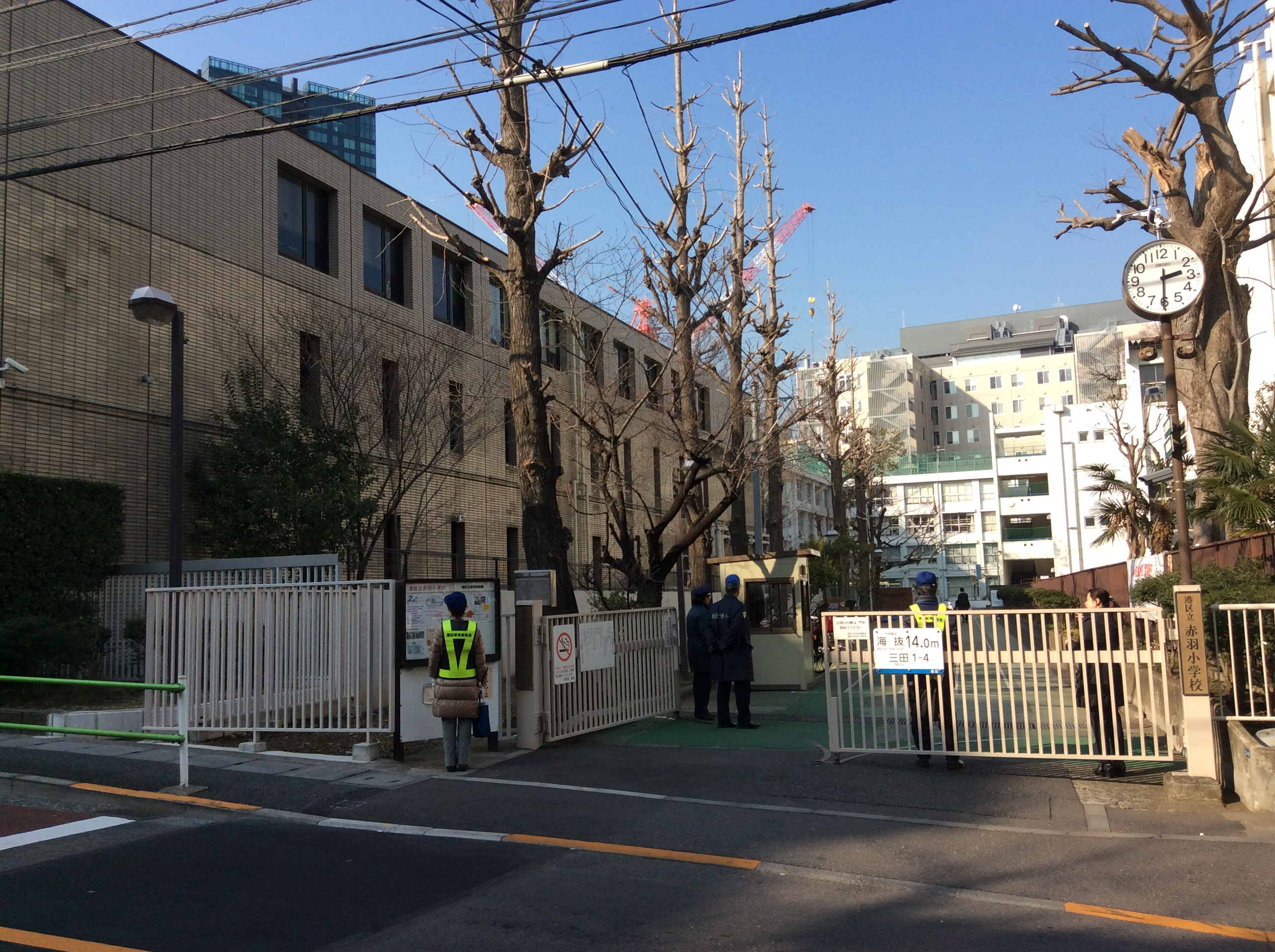
Akabane Elementary School
(赤羽小学校)

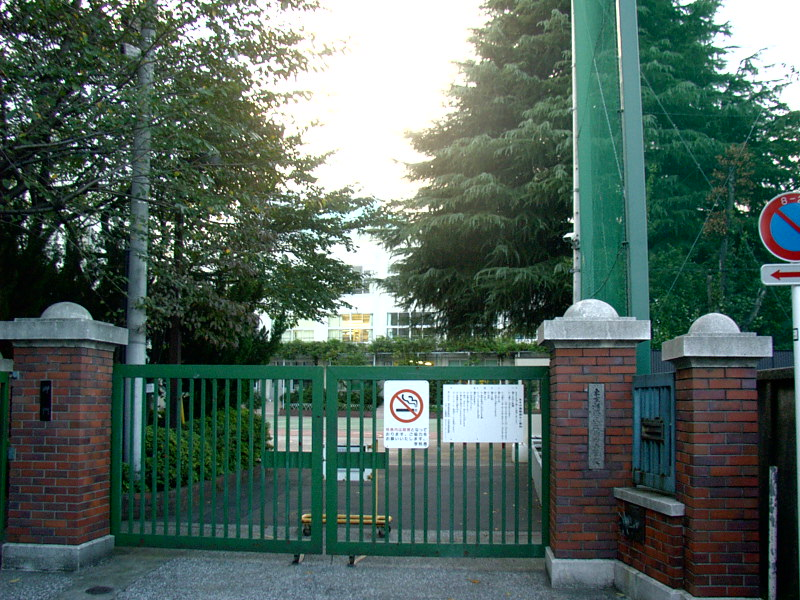
Mita Elementary School
(港区立御田小学校)

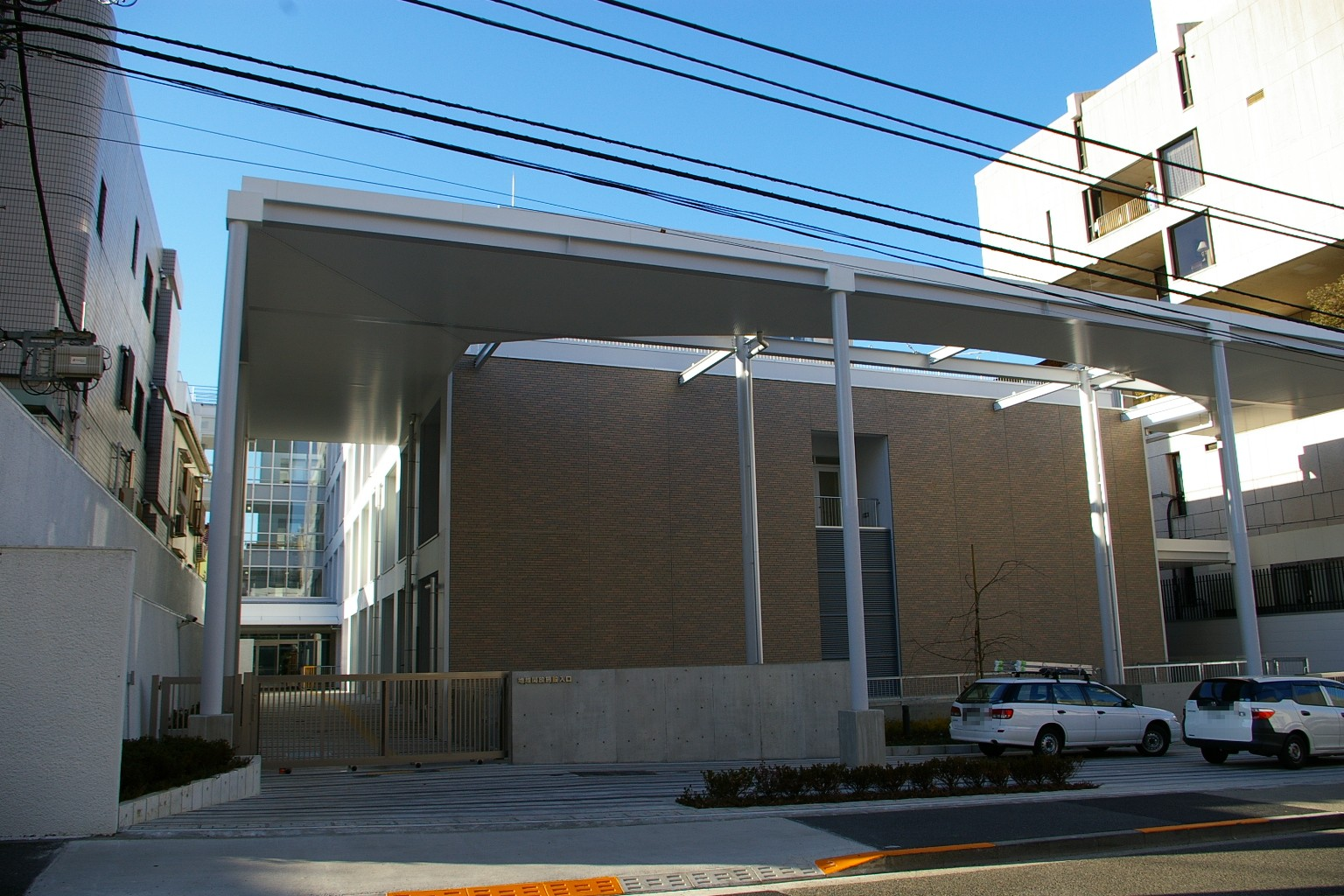
Mita Junior High School
(港区立三田中学校)

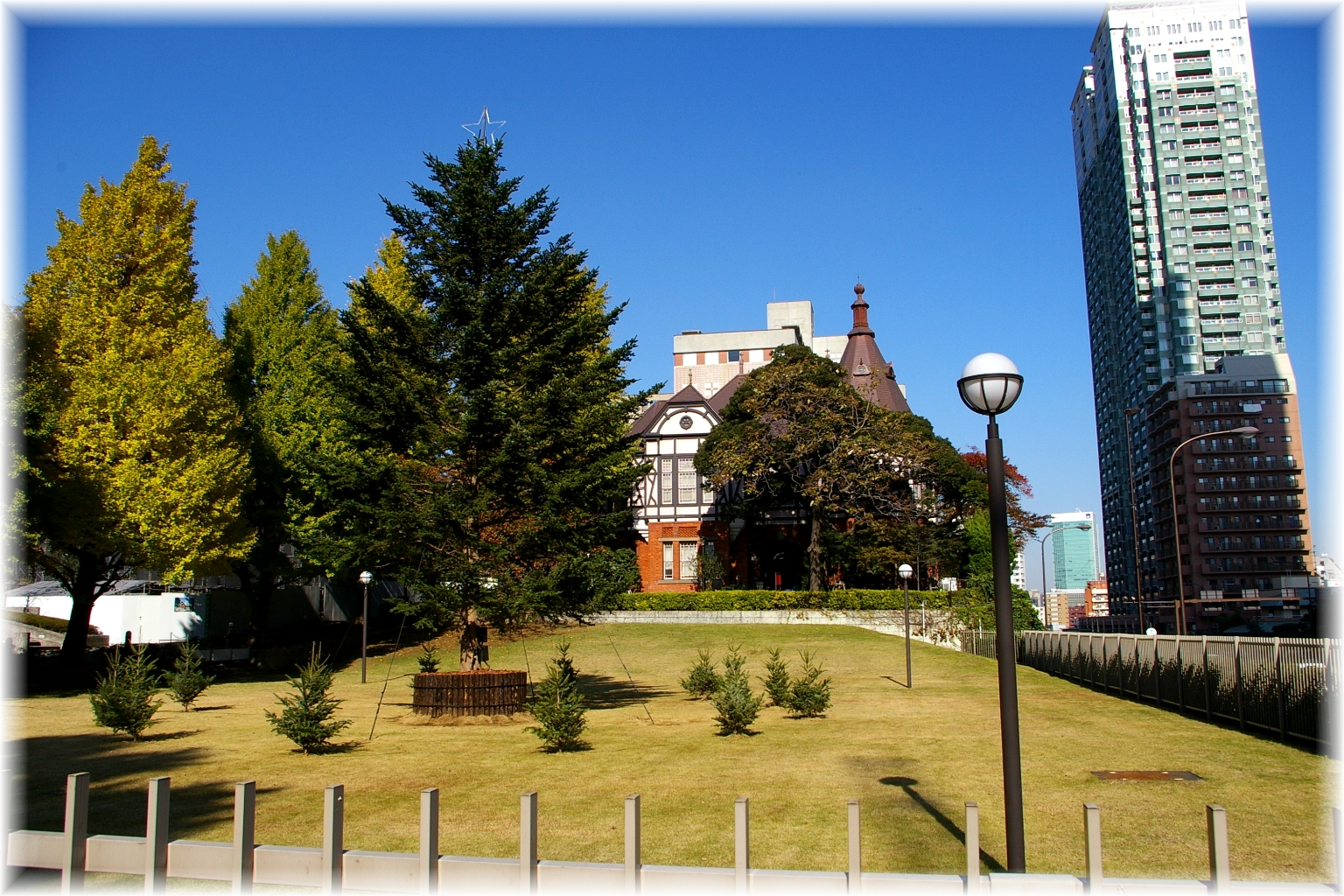
Meiji Gakuin University
(明治学院大学)

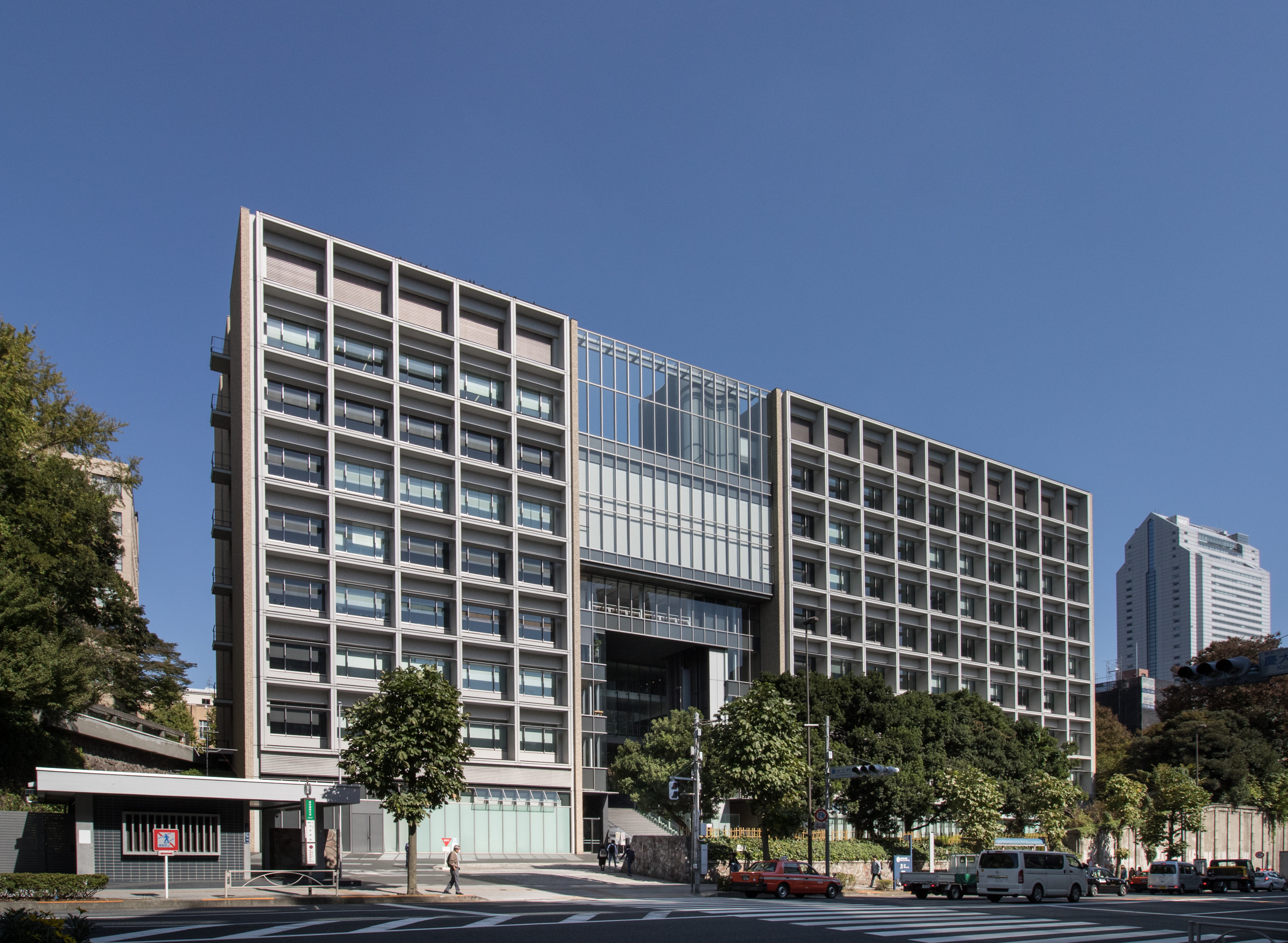
Keio University
(慶應義塾大学)

=== Public libraries ===
Minato City Library operates Mita Library in nearby Shiba.

== See also ==
- Edo Meisho Zukai (江戸名所図解)
- Hasegawa Settan (長谷川雪旦)
