= Yūrei zaka =

Hill road in Minato, Tokyo

Coordinates: 35.64°N 139.74°E

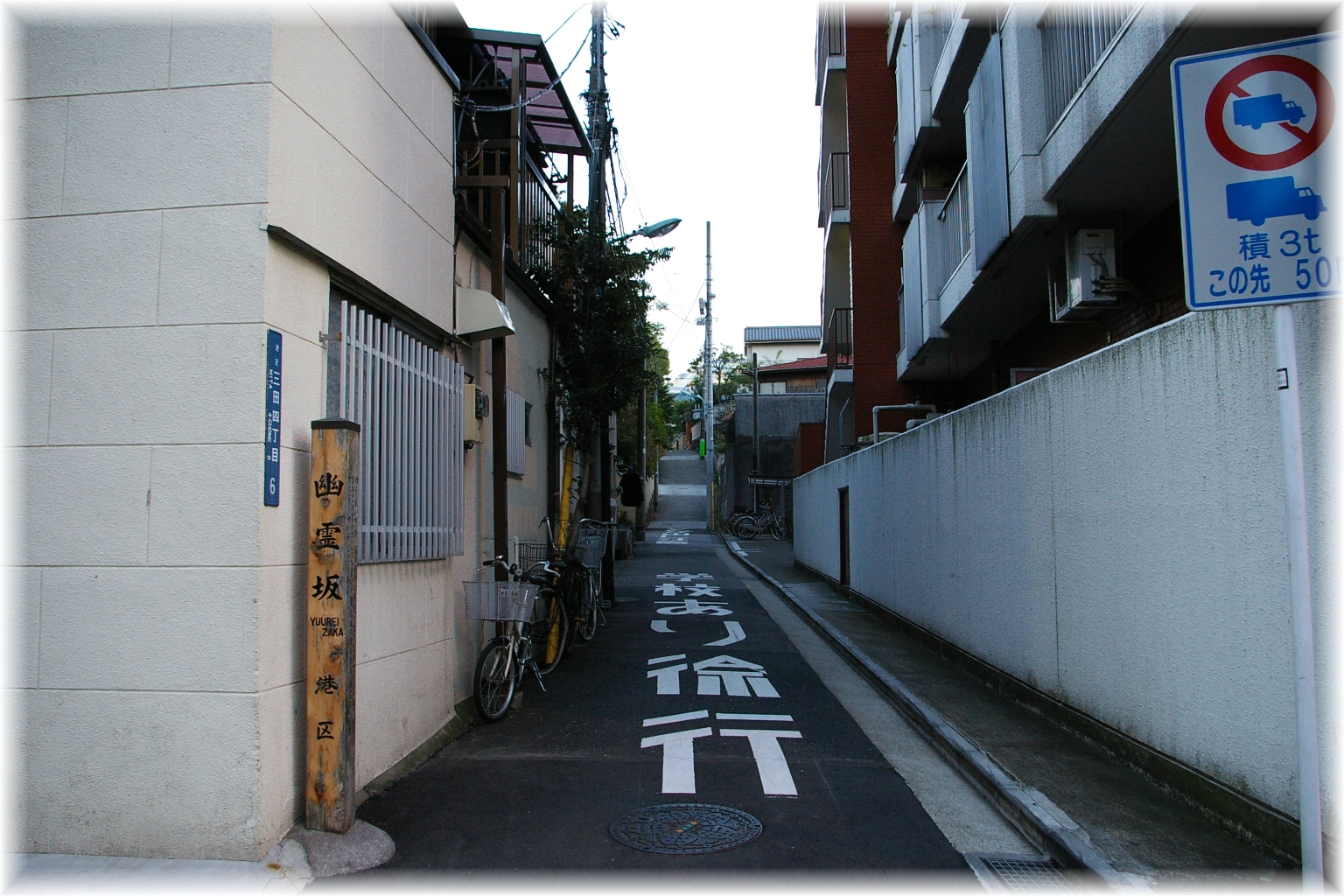
Bottom of Yurei zaka

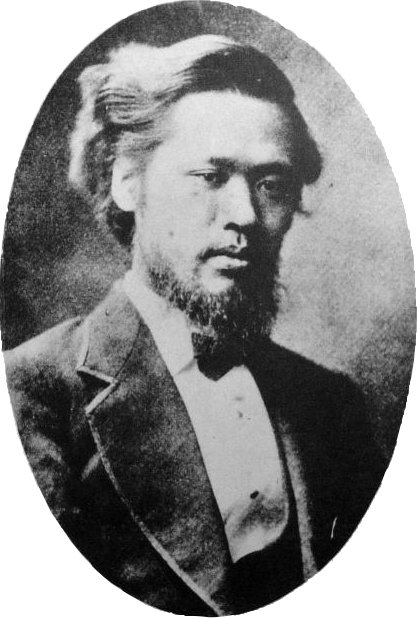
Mori Arinori

Yūreizaka (幽霊坂) is a hill road located in Mita 4-chome in Minato, Tokyo. The slope climbs the promontory from east to west, and climbs along busy Sakurada Avenue and terminates at the intersection with Hijiri zaka. There are two possible sources for the name of the avenue: "Yūrei" meaning ghost, due to the presence of numerous temples along the street, giving it a desolate atmosphere such that ghosts might appear and "Yūrei," an alternate reading for the given name of the first Minister of Education in Japan, and scholar Mori Arinori, who lived in the vicinity.

== See also ==
- Tsuki no Misaki
