= Kamezuka Park =

Children's park in Tokyo, Japan

Coordinates: 35.643164°N 139.740681°E

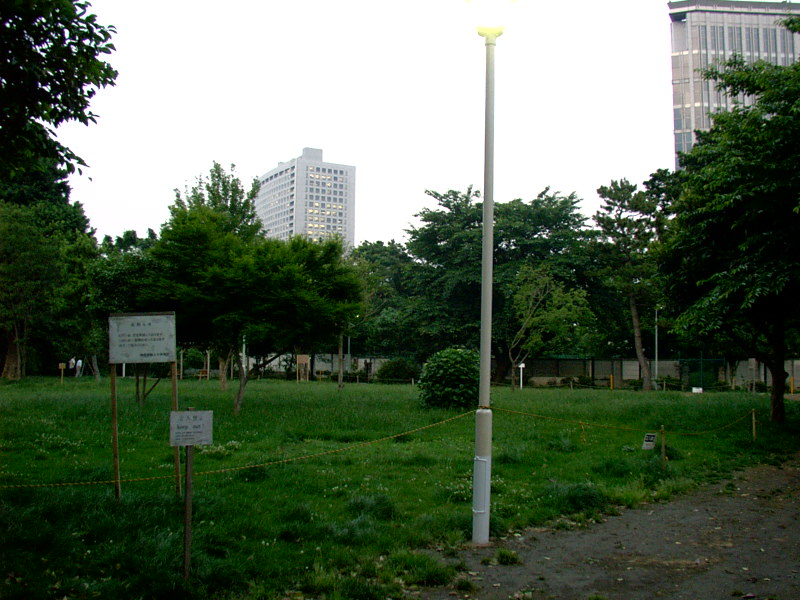
- Open space

- Location within Special wards of Tokyo Location within Tokyo Location within Japan
- Location: Minato, Tokyo, Japan
- Area: 9,183.38 square metres (2.26926 acres)
- Created: 26 December 1952

Kamezuka Park (亀塚公園, Kamezuka Kōen) is a children's park in Minato Ward Mita 4-16-20 in Tokyo in Japan. A literal translation of its name is “turtle tomb park”. It lies on the Tsuki no Misaki plateau. A Japanese temple, Saikai-ji, is next to the park.

== Gallery ==
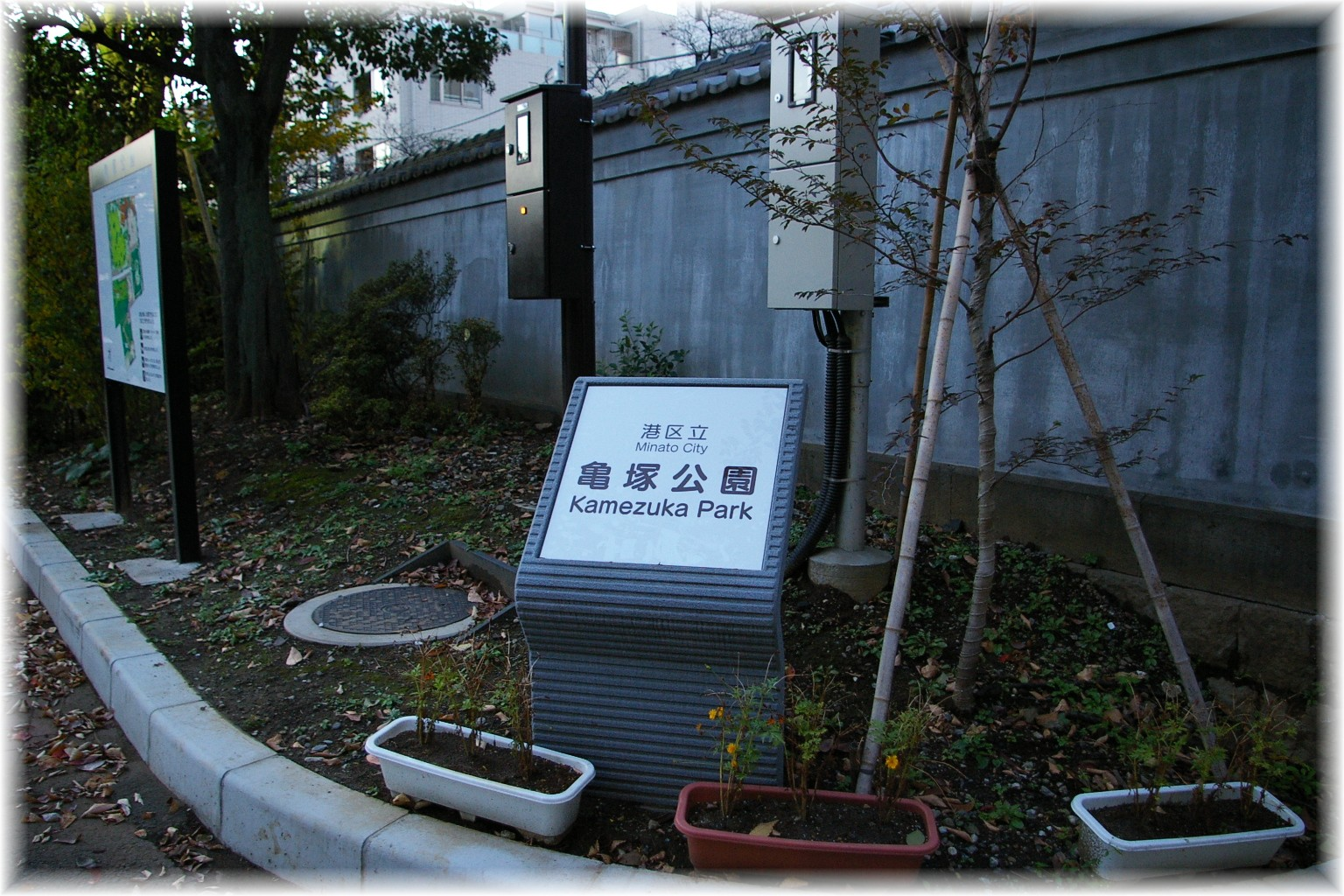
Entrance

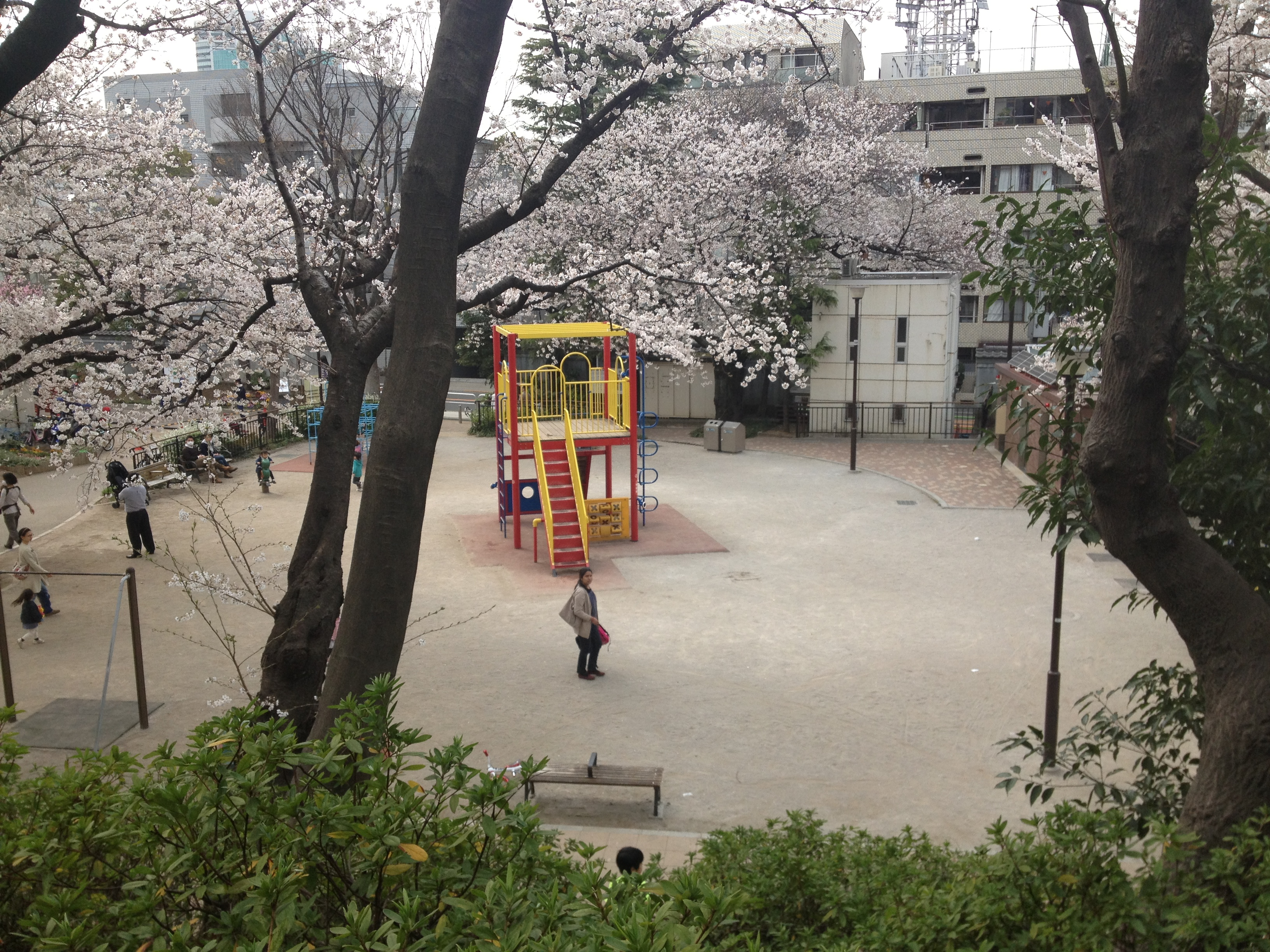
Playground

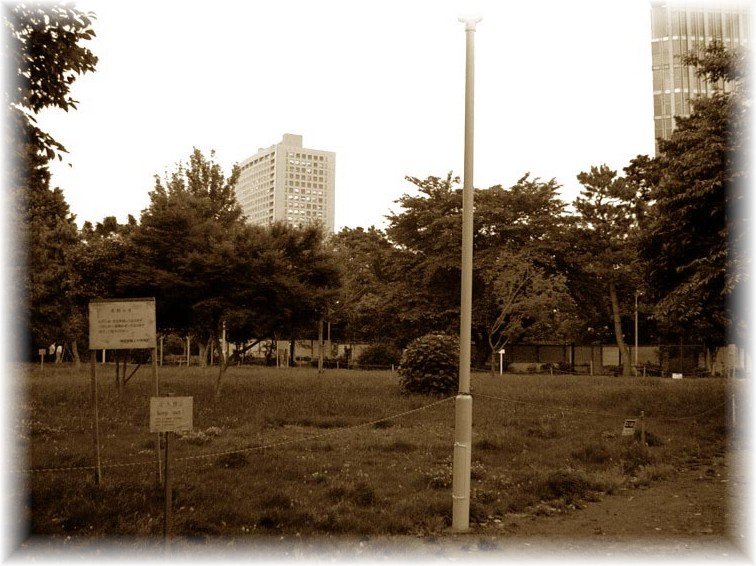
Free space

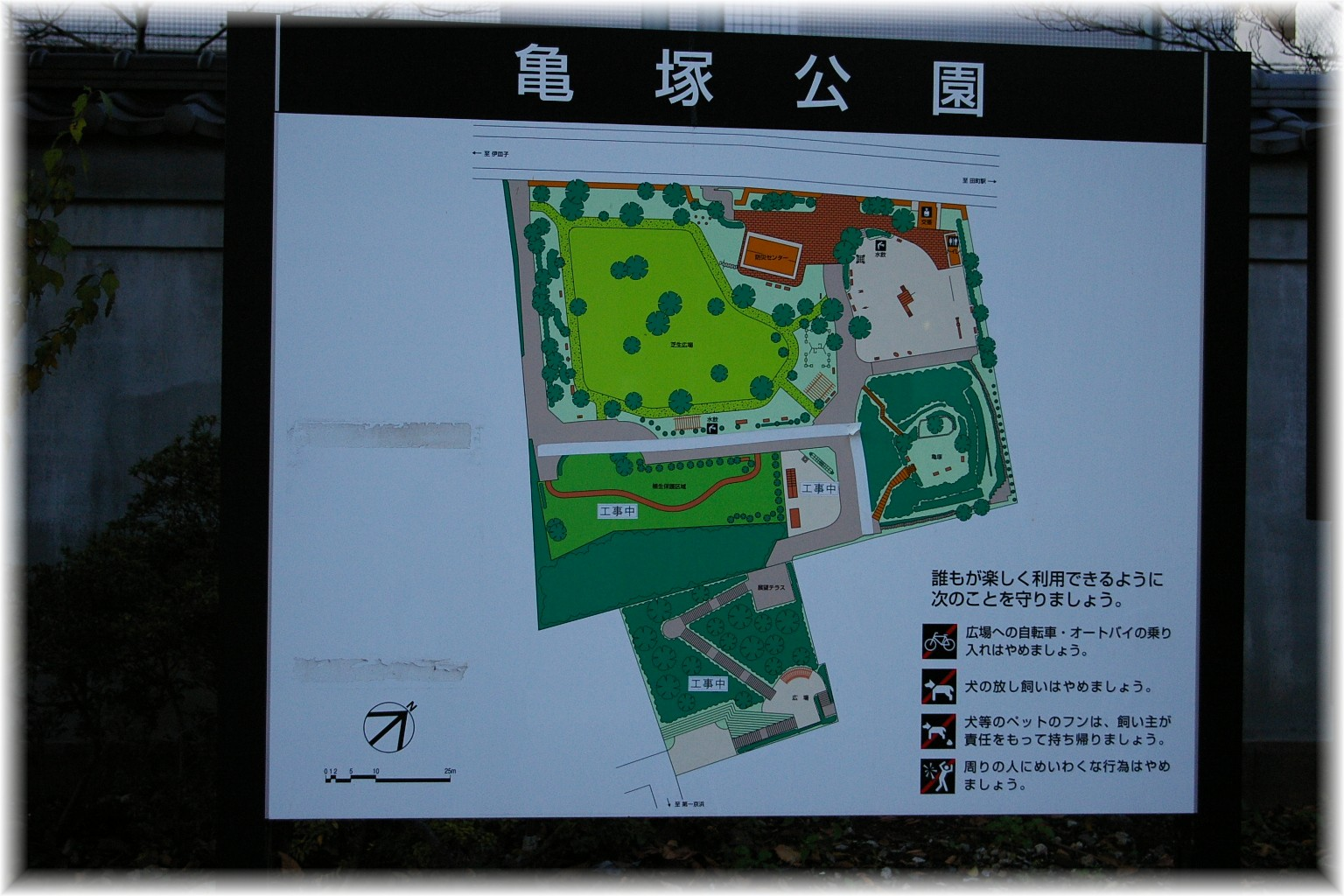
Map

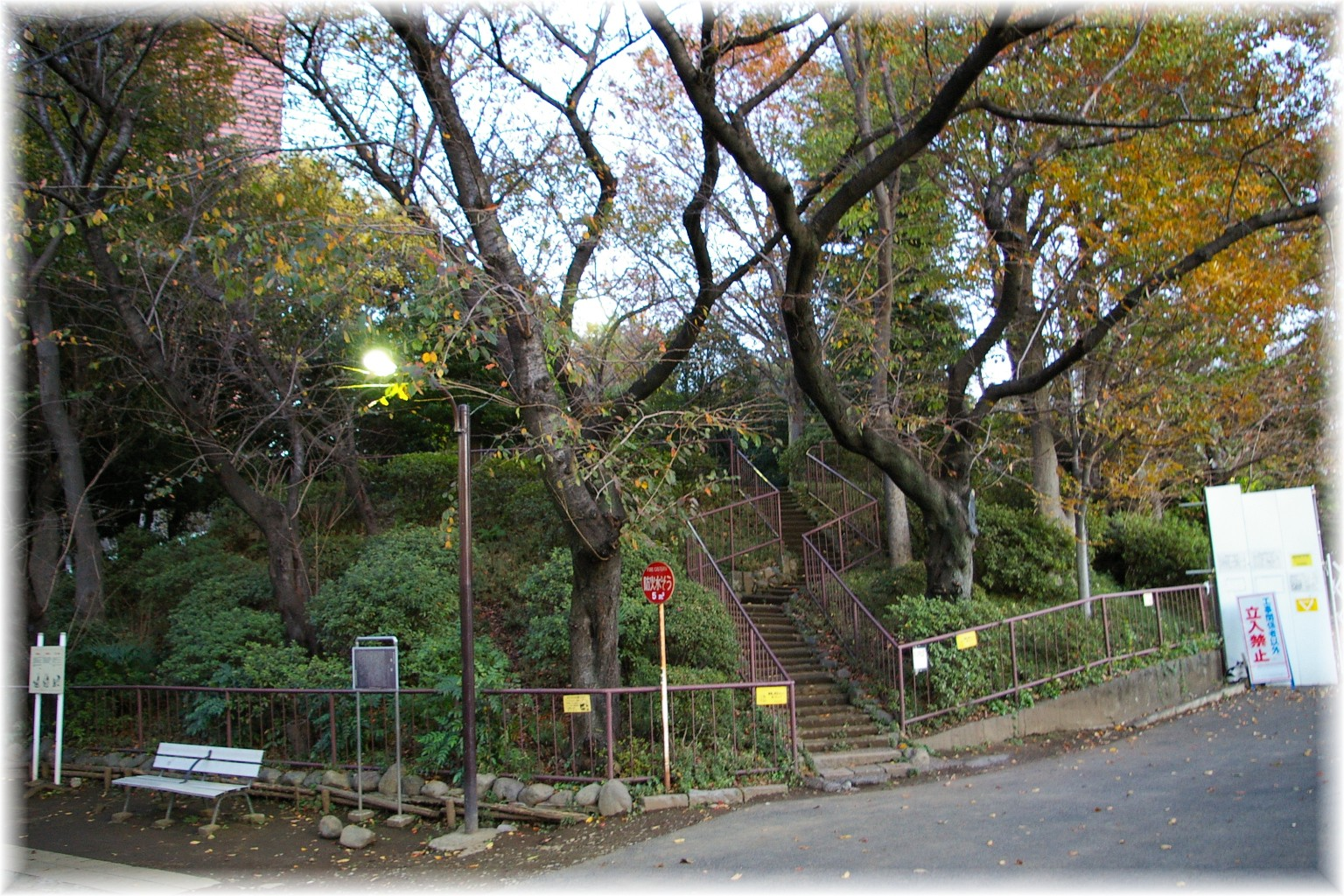
Kamezuka
(total mound)

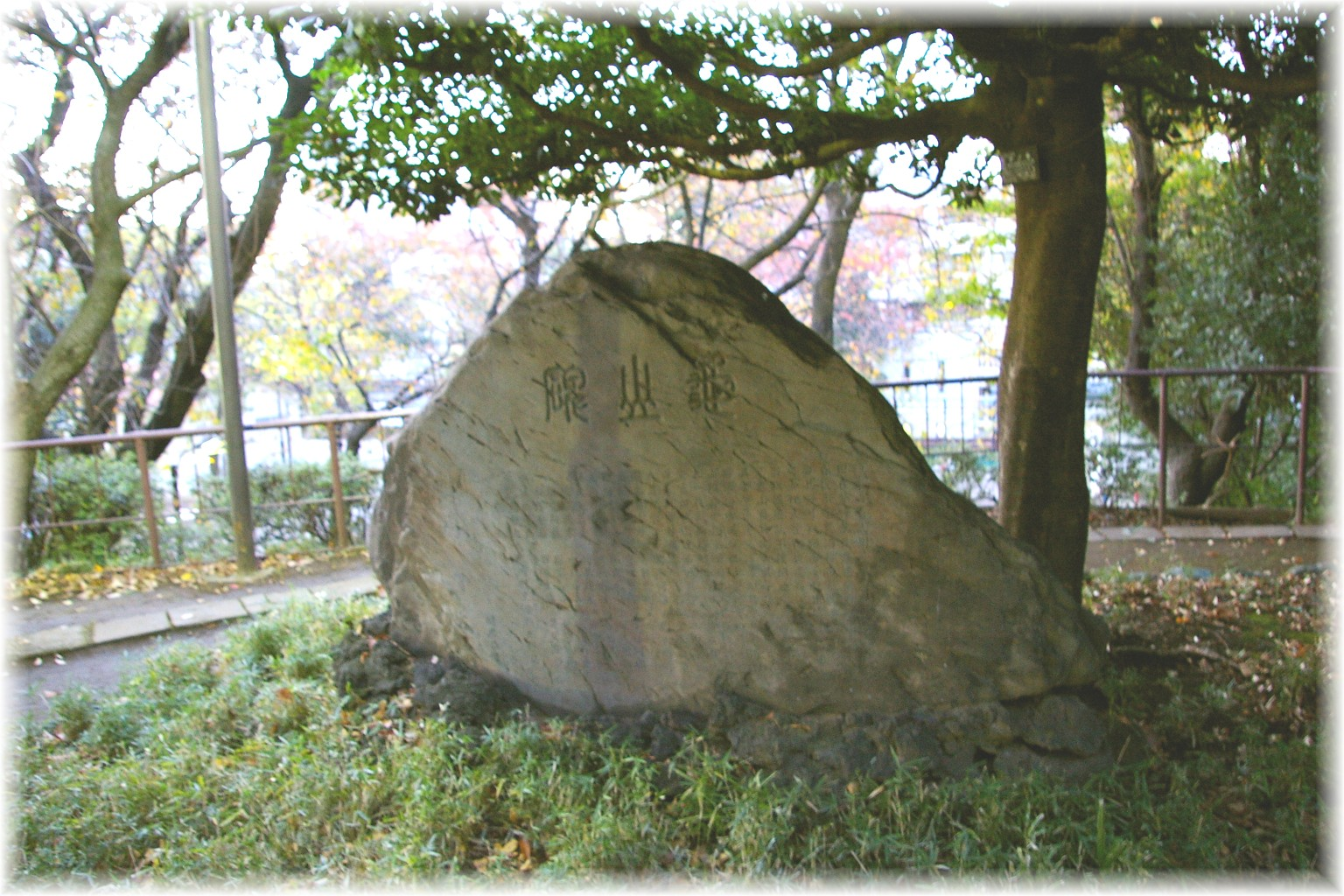
Turtle mound stone monument
(on the total mound)

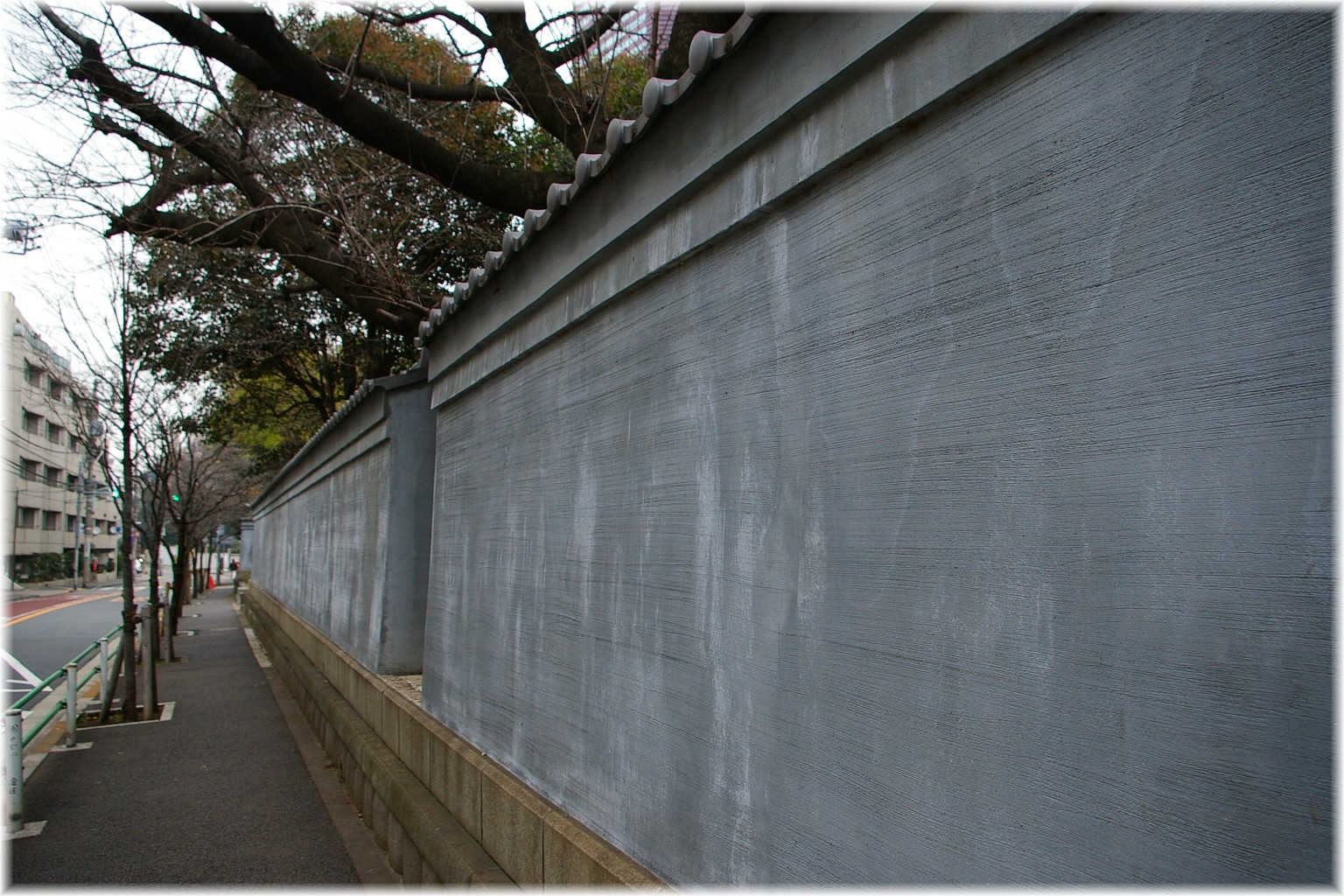
Exterior wall which was Kacho no miya's mansion
