= Daishin =

Daishin may refer to:

- Daishin Kashimoto (樫本 大進, born 1979), Japanese classical violinist
- Daishin Nakamura (中村 大伸, born 1966), Japanese baseball player
- Daishin Noboru (1937 – 2012), Japanese sumo wrestler
- Daishin-ji, a Buddhist temple in Tokyo, Japan
