= Friends Girls Junior & Senior High School =

Girls' school in Japan

- 普連土学園中学校・高等学校

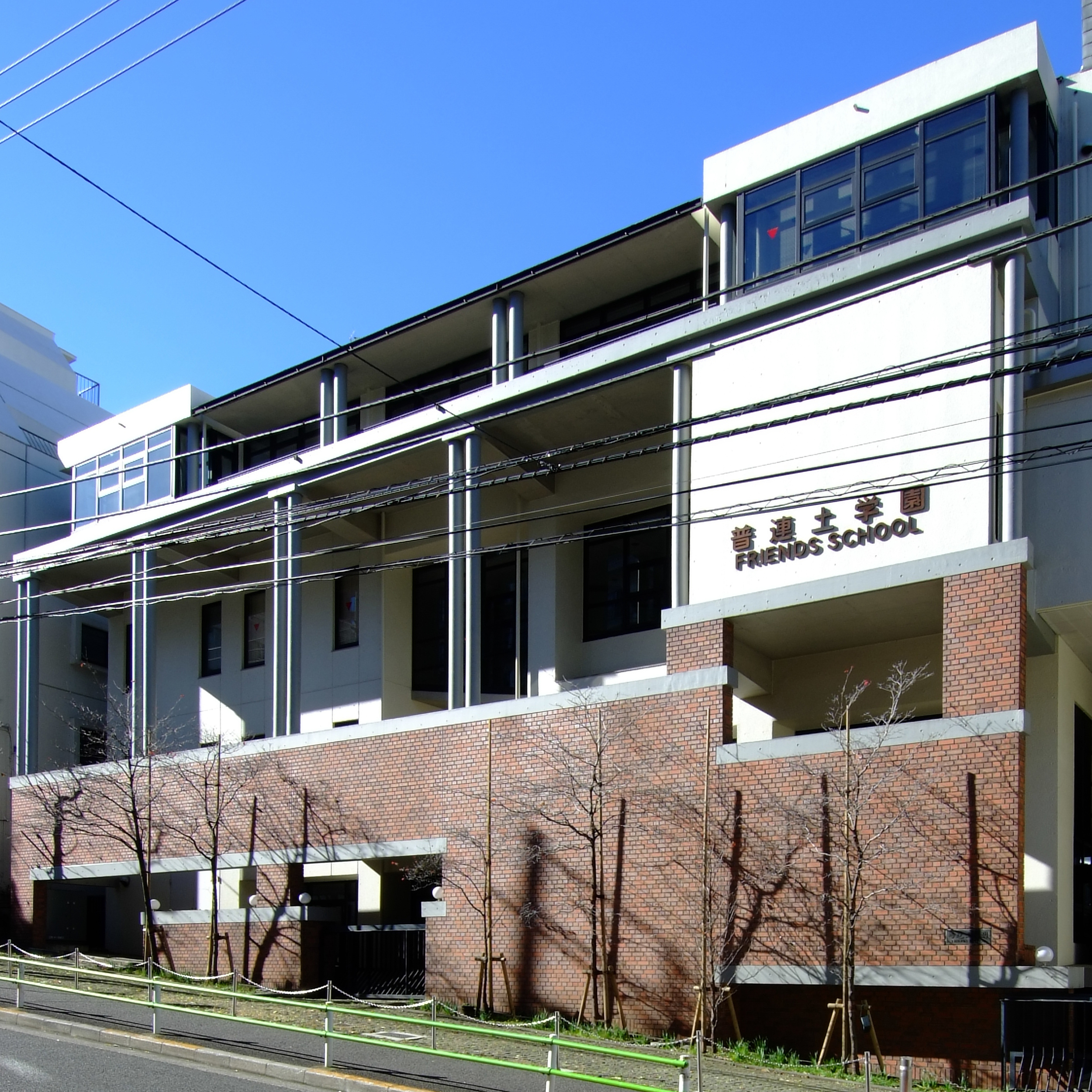
- The school in 2008

Location
- 4-14-16 Mita, Minato-ku; Tokyo, 108-0073; Japan; 35°38′46.16″N 139°44′30.45″E

Information
- Religious affiliation: Protestantism
- Established: 1887; 139 years ago
- Website: www.friends.ac.jp

Friends Girls Junior & Senior High School (普連土学園中学校・高等学校, Furendo Gakuen Chūgakkō Kōtōgakkō), also known as Friends School (普連土学園, Furendo Gakuen), is a girls' junior and senior high school (7th - 12th grades), authorized by the Japanese Education Law, of Religious Society of Friends in Mita, Minato, Tokyo, Japan.

In 1887, Women Evangelical Friends from Philadelphia, Pennsylvania, USA founded it for the purpose of education for women on the advice of Uchimura Kanzō and Nitobe Inazō. The School is still the only Friends' educational organization in Japan. Whilst all the pupils are not Friends, they receive education about Quakerism including about Inner light.

The School states that the characters used to transliterate 'Friend' in Japanese mean "universal connection with all global places". This is derived from an idea of Tsuda Sen, who was the father of Tsuda Umeko, the founder of Tsuda College.

== Notable alumni ==
- Michiyo Aratama, actress
- Asami Kobayashi, singer and actress
- Marie Kondo, organizing consultant
- Yasuko Namba, mountaineer
- Chiyako Sato, singer
