= Mita Hachiman Shrine =

Shinto shrine in Tokyo Prefecture, Japan

Mita Hachiman Jinja (御田八幡神社)
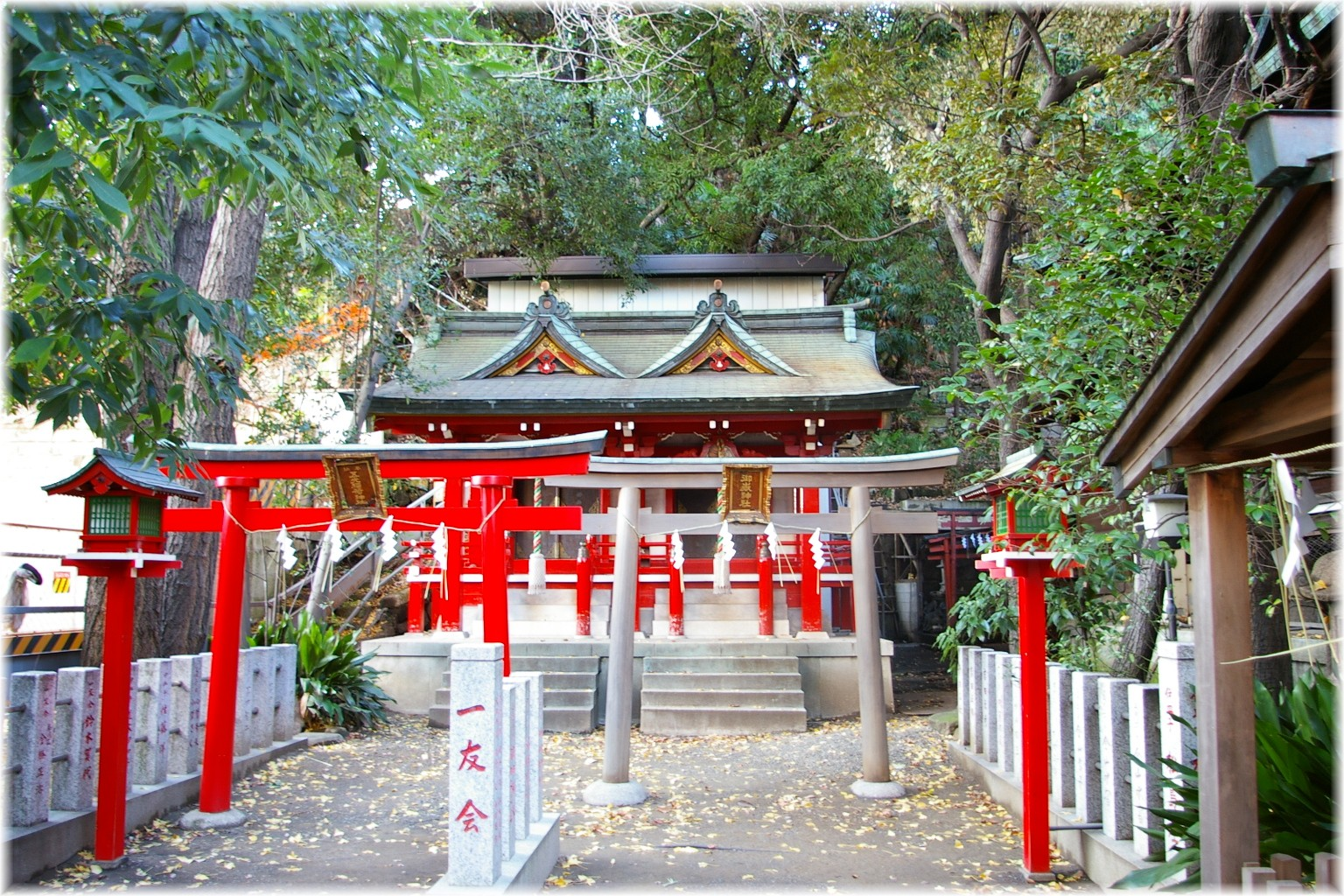
- 五光稲荷神社」(Gokoh Inari Jinja "five light shrine")

- Location within Japan

Religion
- Affiliation: Shinto

Location
- Coordinates: 35.64311°N 139.74150°E

Mita Hachiman Jinja (御田八幡神社) is a Shinto shrine in Mita 3-7-16, Minato, Tokyo, Japan. Its festival is on the 15th of August. It is said to have been established in the year 709.

- God's Name: Hondawakeno Mikoto (誉田別尊命), Amenokoyaneno Mikoto (天児屋根命), Takenouchi Sukuneno Mikoto (武内宿禰命)
- Shrines in precincts: Gokō Inari Jinja (五光稲荷神社), Mikage Jinja (御嶽神社)
- Facilities in precincts: Kaguraden (神楽殿: hall for Shinto music and dance), Chōzuya (手水舎: place for cleansing), Shamusho (社務所: shrine office).

== Gallery ==
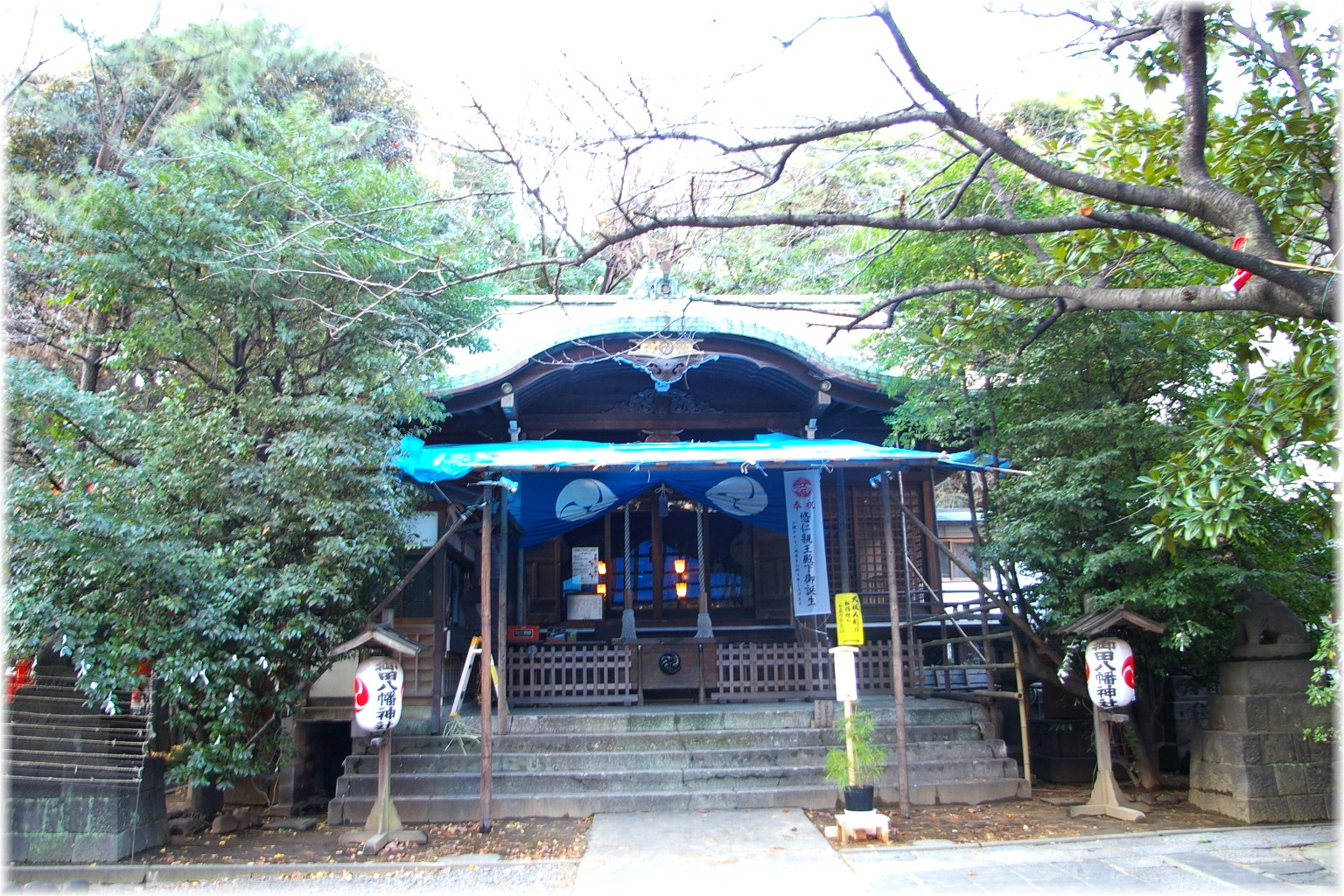
Honden

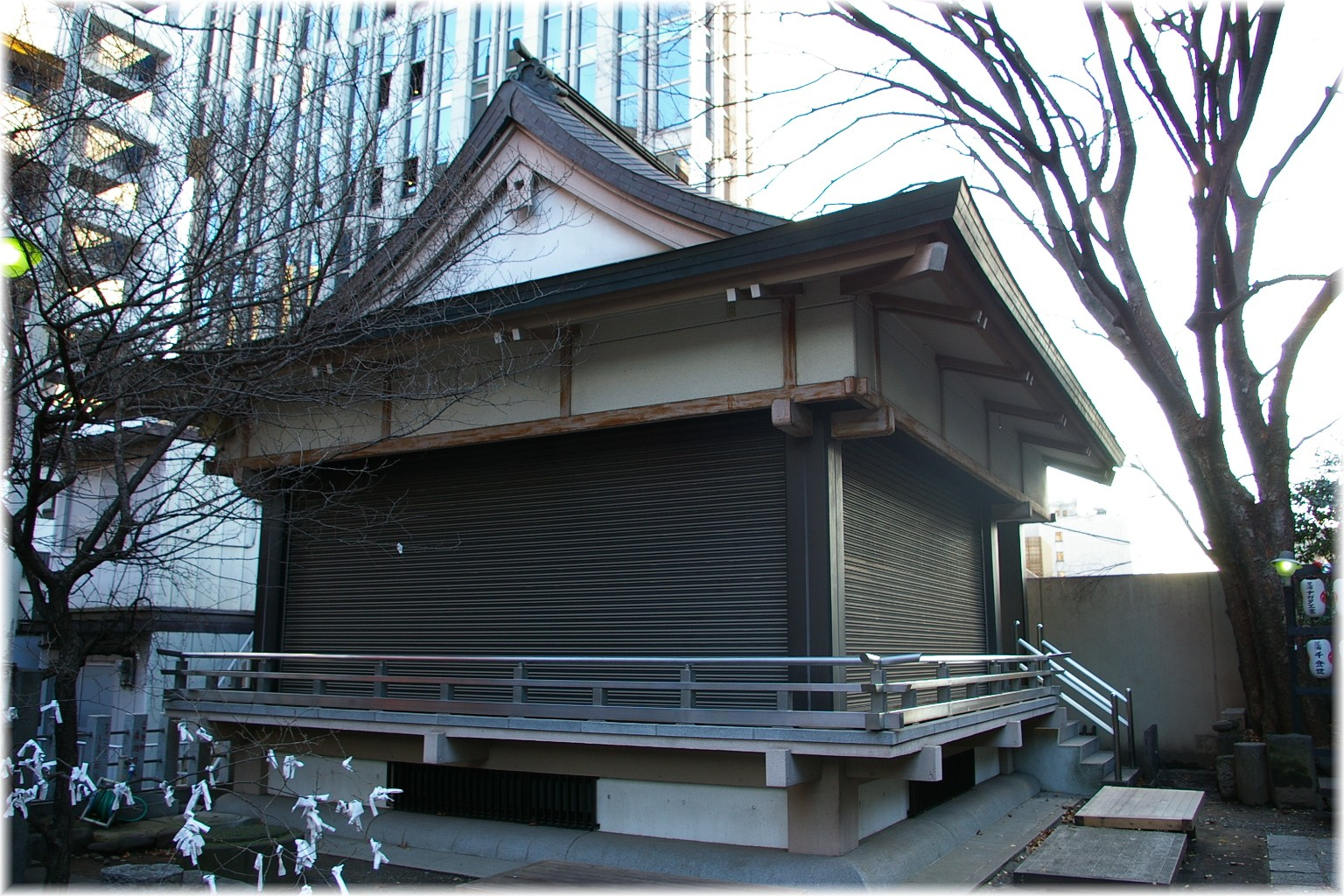
Kagura-den

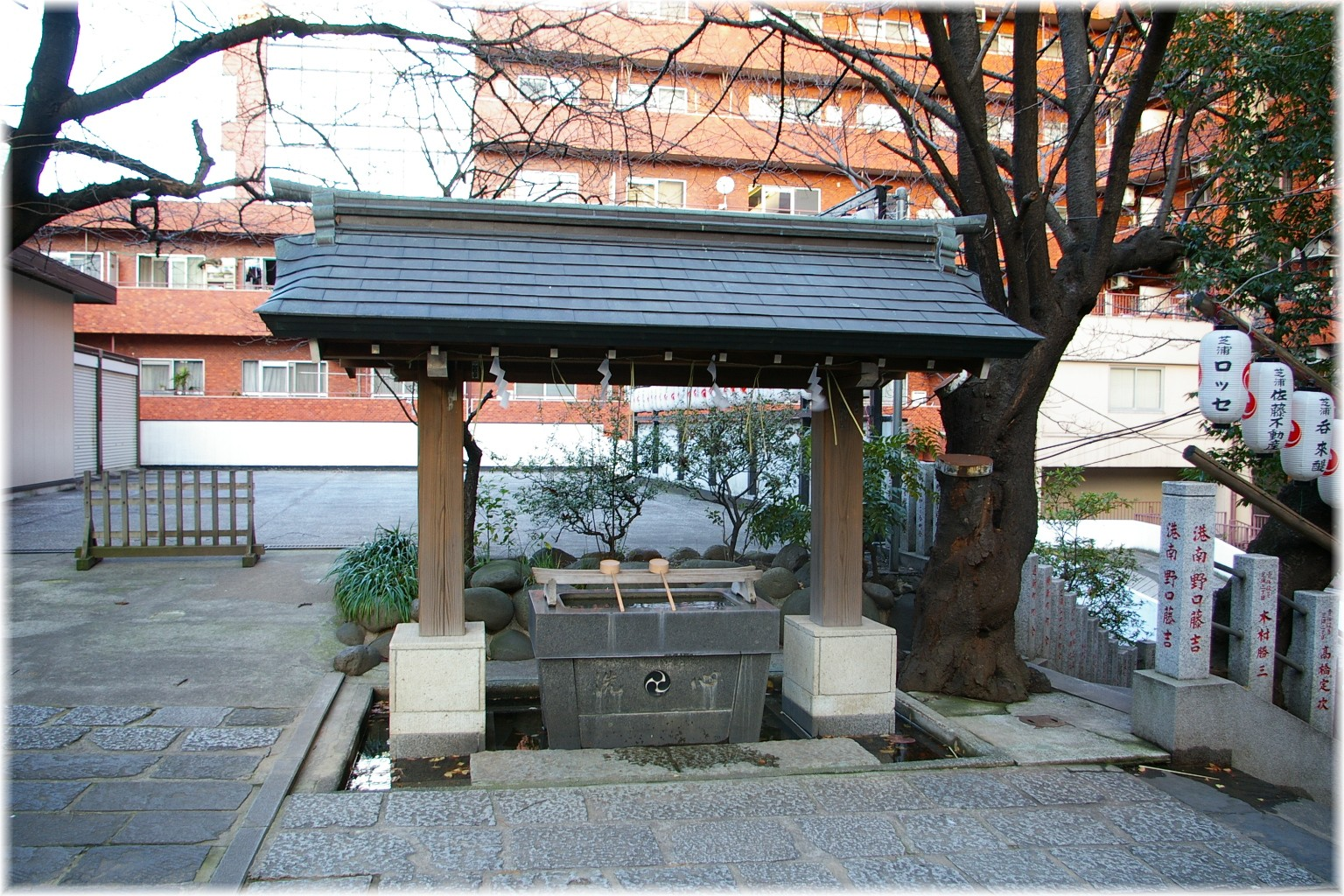
Temizuya

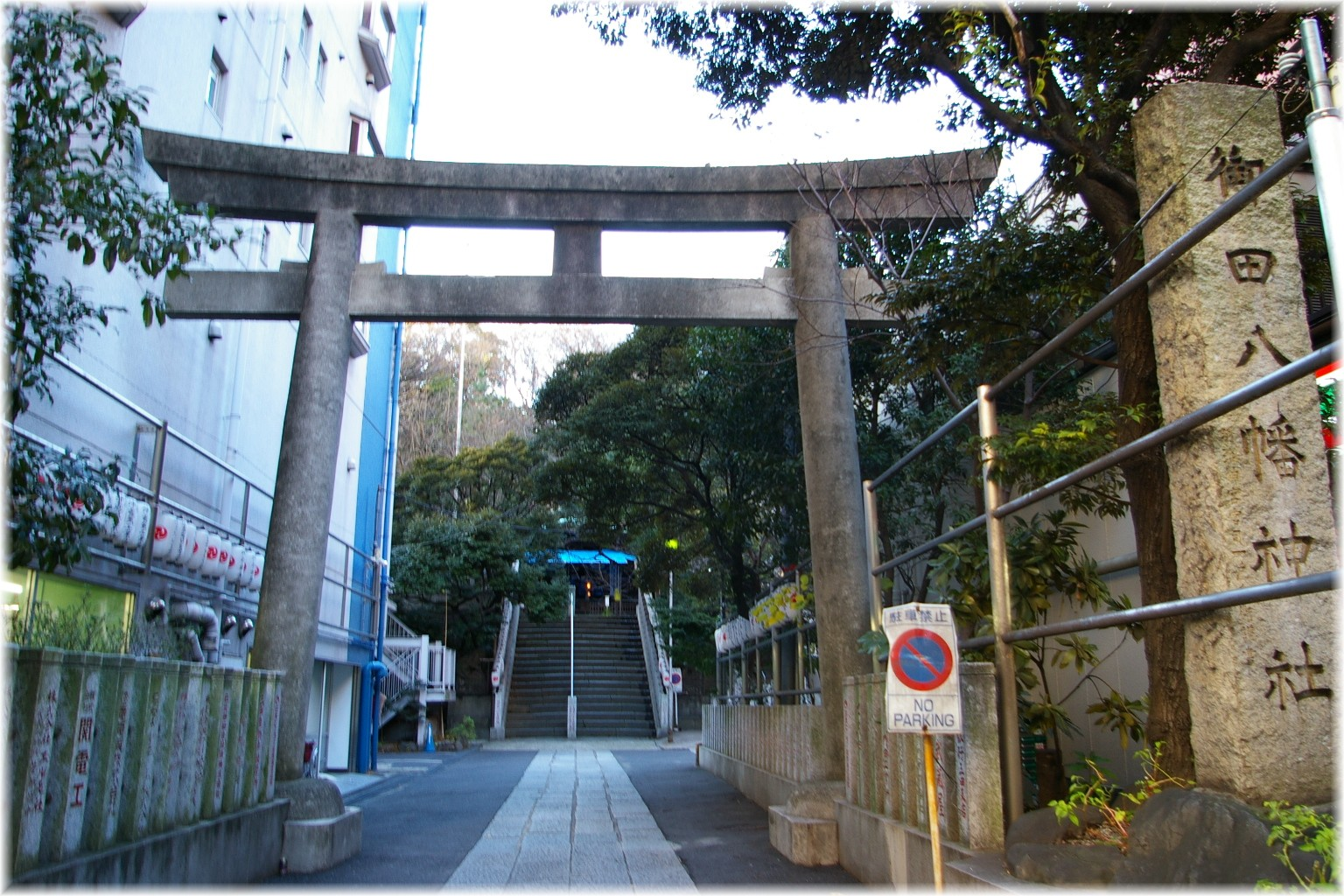
Torii

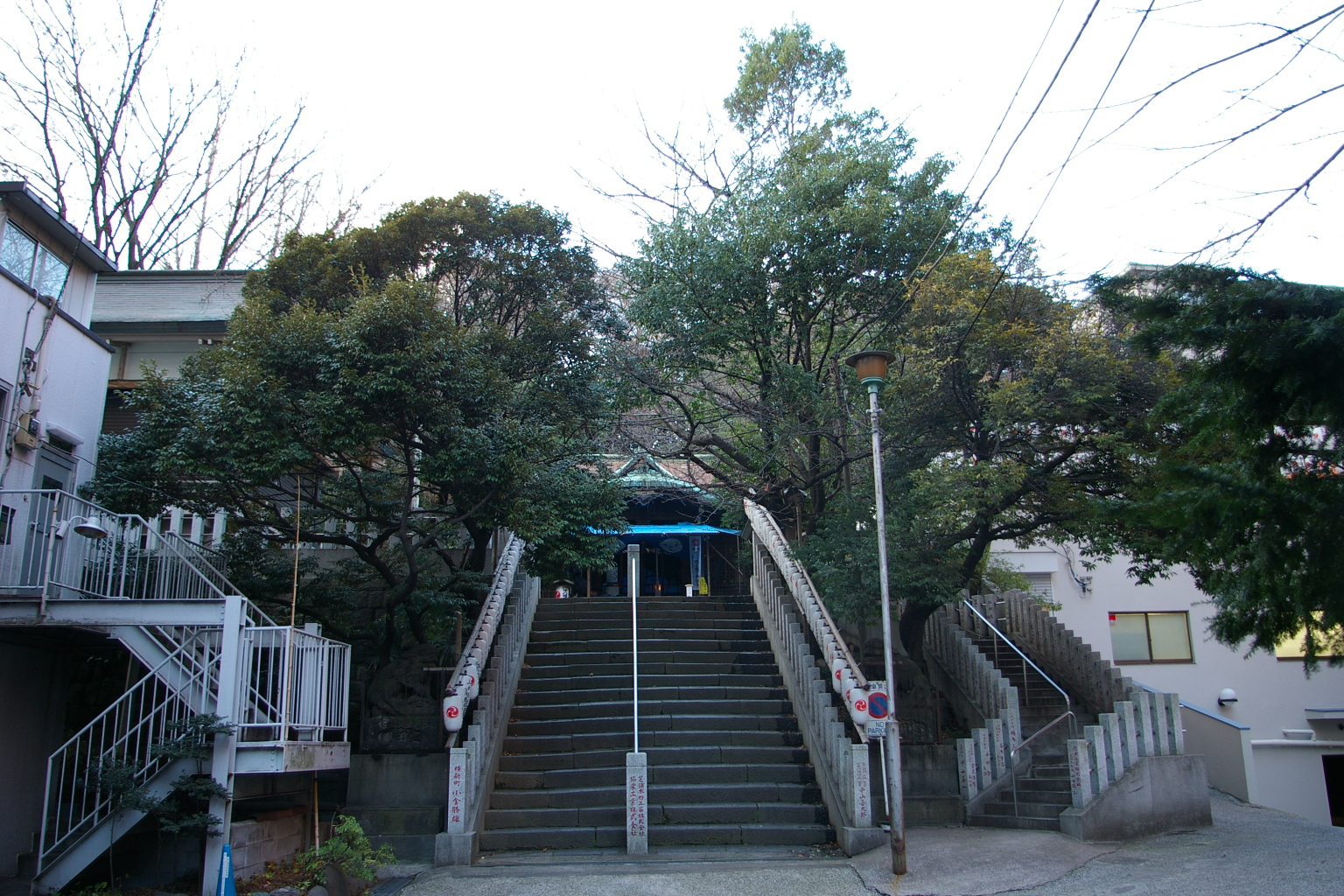
A flight of stone steps
