= Saikai-ji =

Buddhist temple in Tokyo, Japan

Coordinates: 35°38′37″N 139°44′29″E

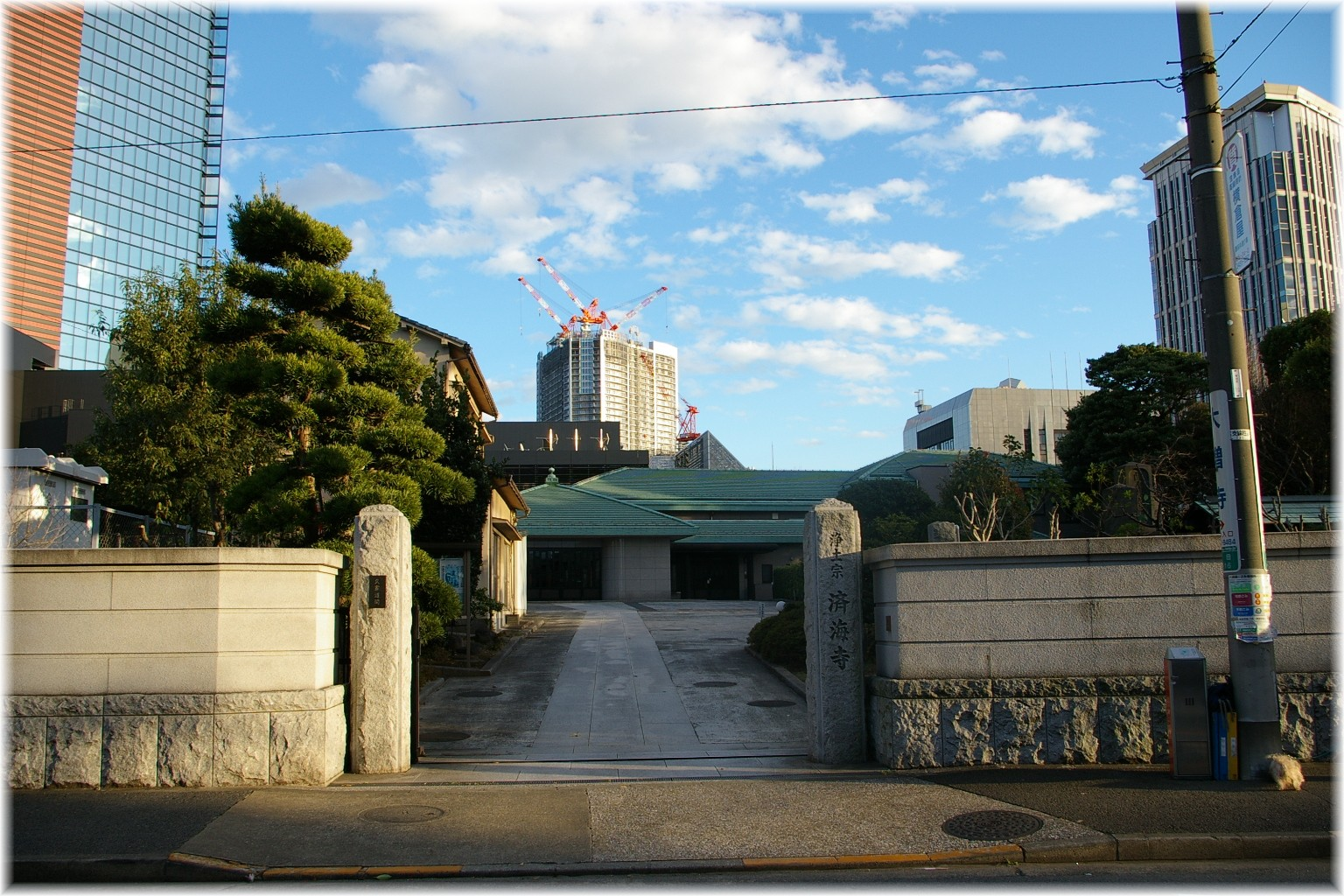
Saikai-ji

Shūkōzan Chōjuin Saikai-ji (周光山長寿院済海寺), more commonly Saikai-ji (済海寺), is a Japanese temple in 4-16-23, Mita, Minato, Tokyo (on the Tsuki no Misaki). Its religious sect and principal image are Jōdo-shū and Amitābha respectively.

It is the 26th of the 33 Kannon temples in Edo. The main deity of the temple is Kamezuka Seikannon Bosatsu (亀塚正観世音菩薩).

== History ==
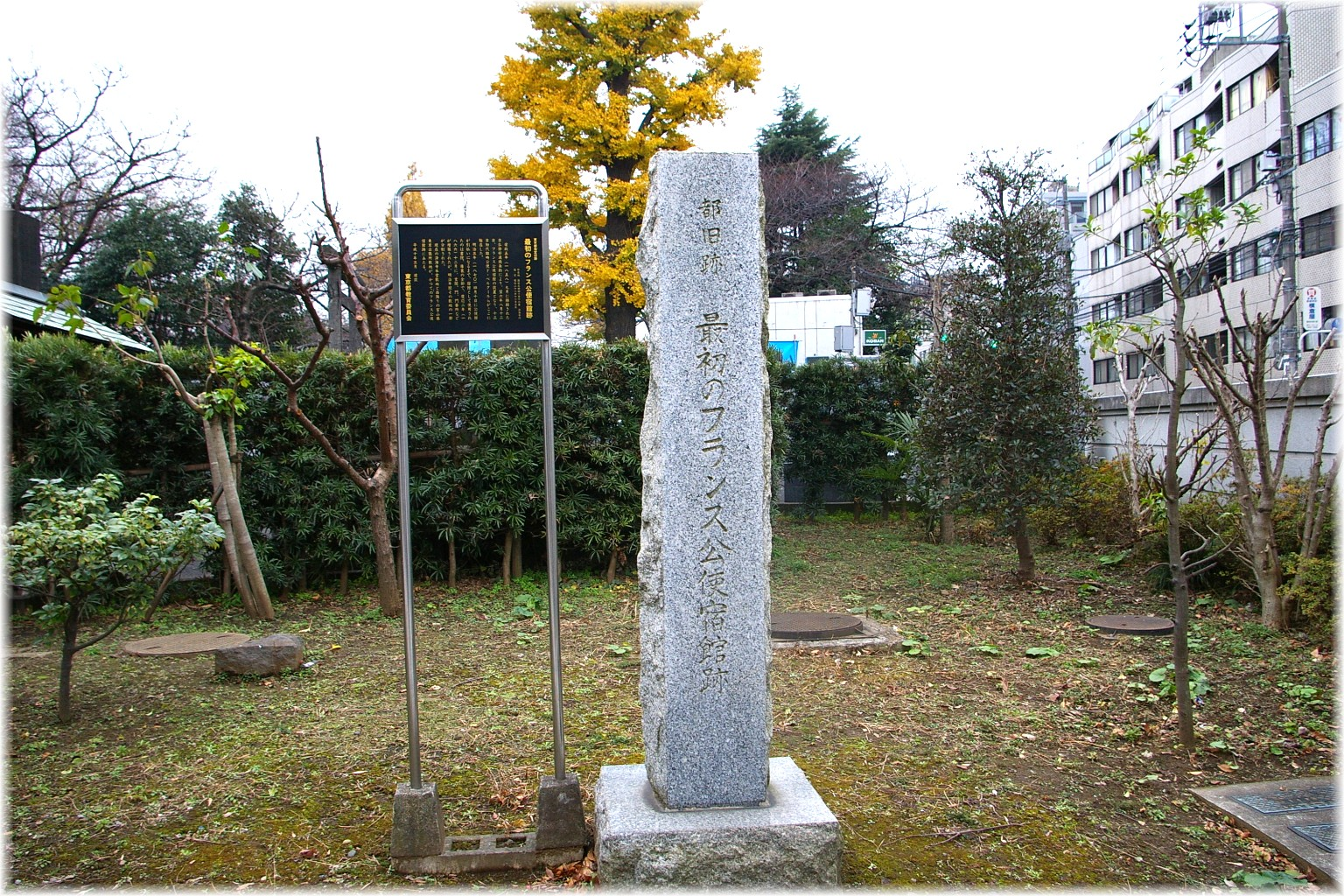
Monumento of the first France legation

Meiwa 7 (1621) St. Munen found this. Ansei 6 (1856), it was the France consulate general and two years after became legation. Now, the monument of the first remains of the France minister government residence stands in the precincts of a temple.

== Geography ==
This is located on the sea side of the Tsuki no Misaki highland, and next to Kamezuka Kohen. During the Edo period, people were able to see the unparalleled view toward the Edo bay from there. This temple is located in the former site of the Takeshiba temple (竹芝寺) of the Takeshiba tradition.

== See also ==
- France–Japan relations (19th century)
