= Takanawa Shrine =

Religious building in Japan

Takanawa Shrine (高輪神社, Takanawa Jinja)
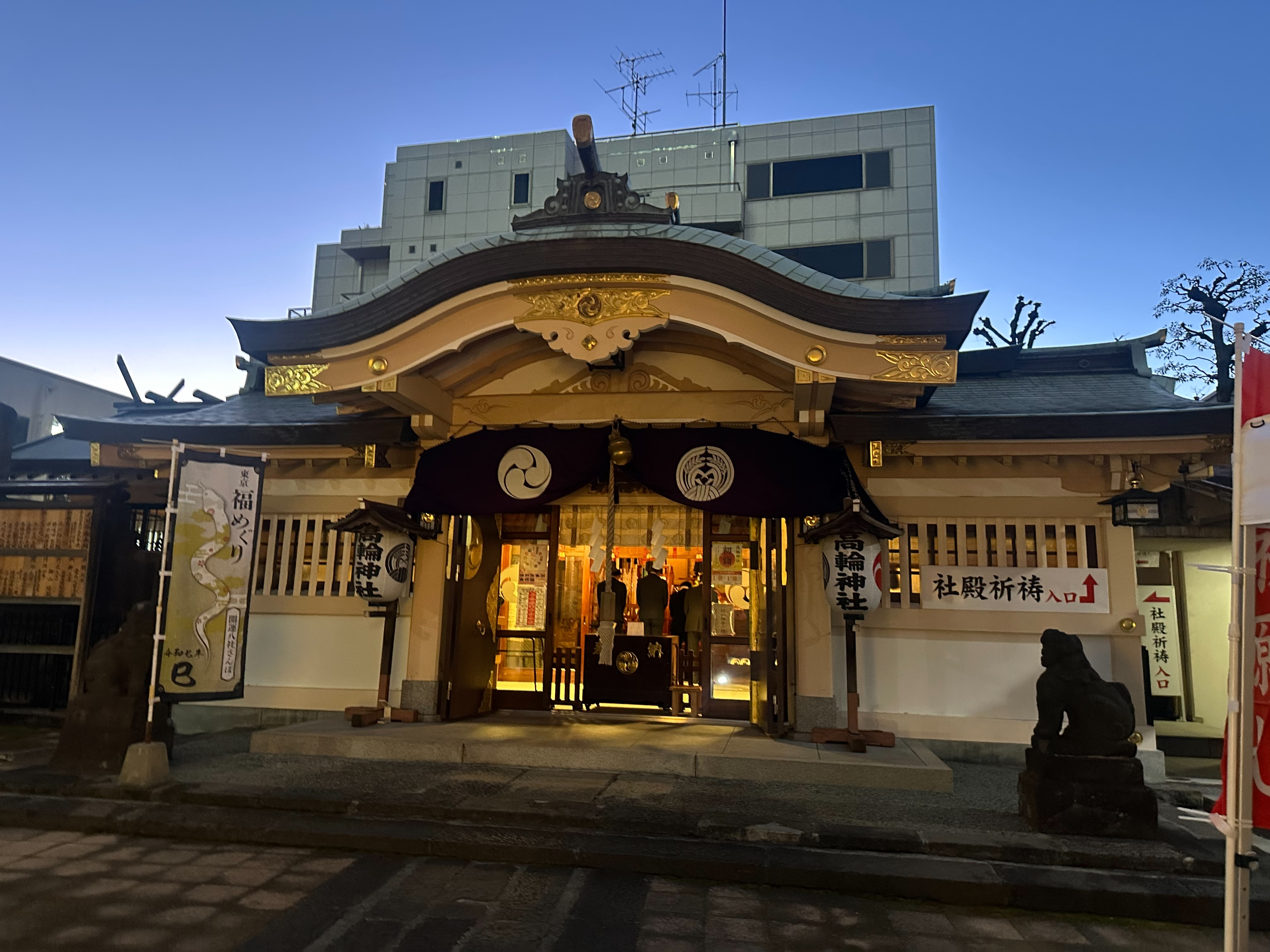
- Haiden

- Location within Japan

Religion
- Affiliation: Shinto

Location
- Coordinates: 35°38′7.05″N 139°44′16.3″E

Takanawa Shrine (高輪神社, Takanawa Jinja) is a Shintō shrine which exists in Tokyo Minato Ward Takanawa 2-chome 14-18. It was established in the Meio years (1492–1501). January 24 of 2 of Koka a fire broke out, except to the stone gate and Otorii, all buildings burned. The present main hall of the shrine was built in 1980. The annual festival is September 10, and another ceremony is the festival of being extinguished is hosted.
