= Daishin-ji =

Coordinates: 35°38′37″N 139°44′13″E

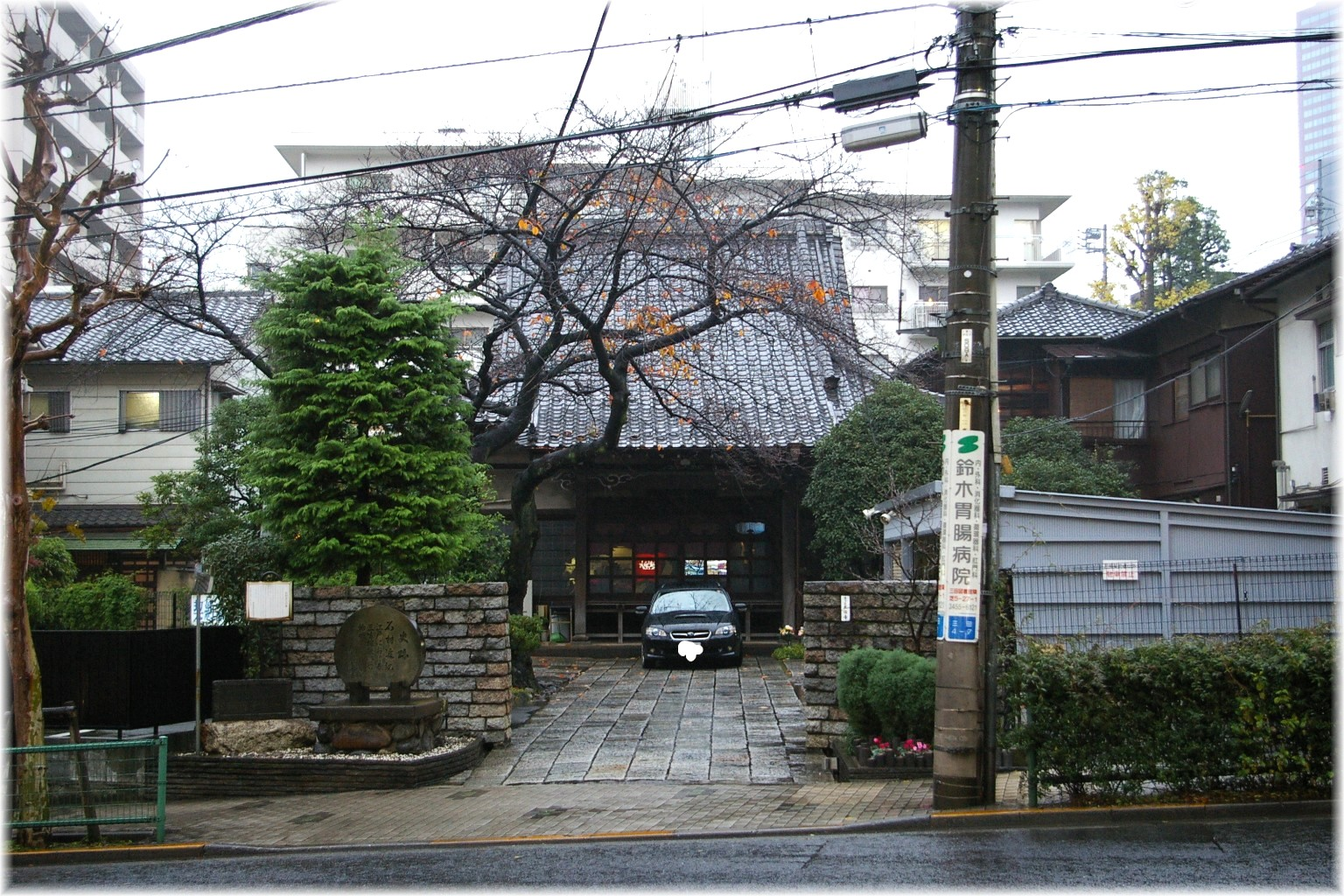
Daishin-ji

Hōtōzan Hōju-in Daishin-ji (宝島山峯樹院大信寺), abbreviated Daishin-ji, is a Buddhist temple of the Jōdo sect in Minato, Tokyo, Japan. In 1611, the founder, Ryō-kō Shōnin, was given land for the temple in Minami Hatchōbori by the Tokugawa shogunate. The temple was originally named Hōtōzan. In 1635, it was relocated to its present site in Mita 4 chōme by order of the government, to accommodate the continuing expansion of Edo. In 1636, Ishimura Genzaemon, considered the first shamisen craftsman in Edo, was buried in the temple. From Ishimura Omi, the graves of eleven generations of the family were also constructed there. For this reason, the temple is sometimes nicknamed "The Shamisen Temple."
