= Tsuki no Misaki =

Former name for a plateau in Mita, Tokyo, Japan

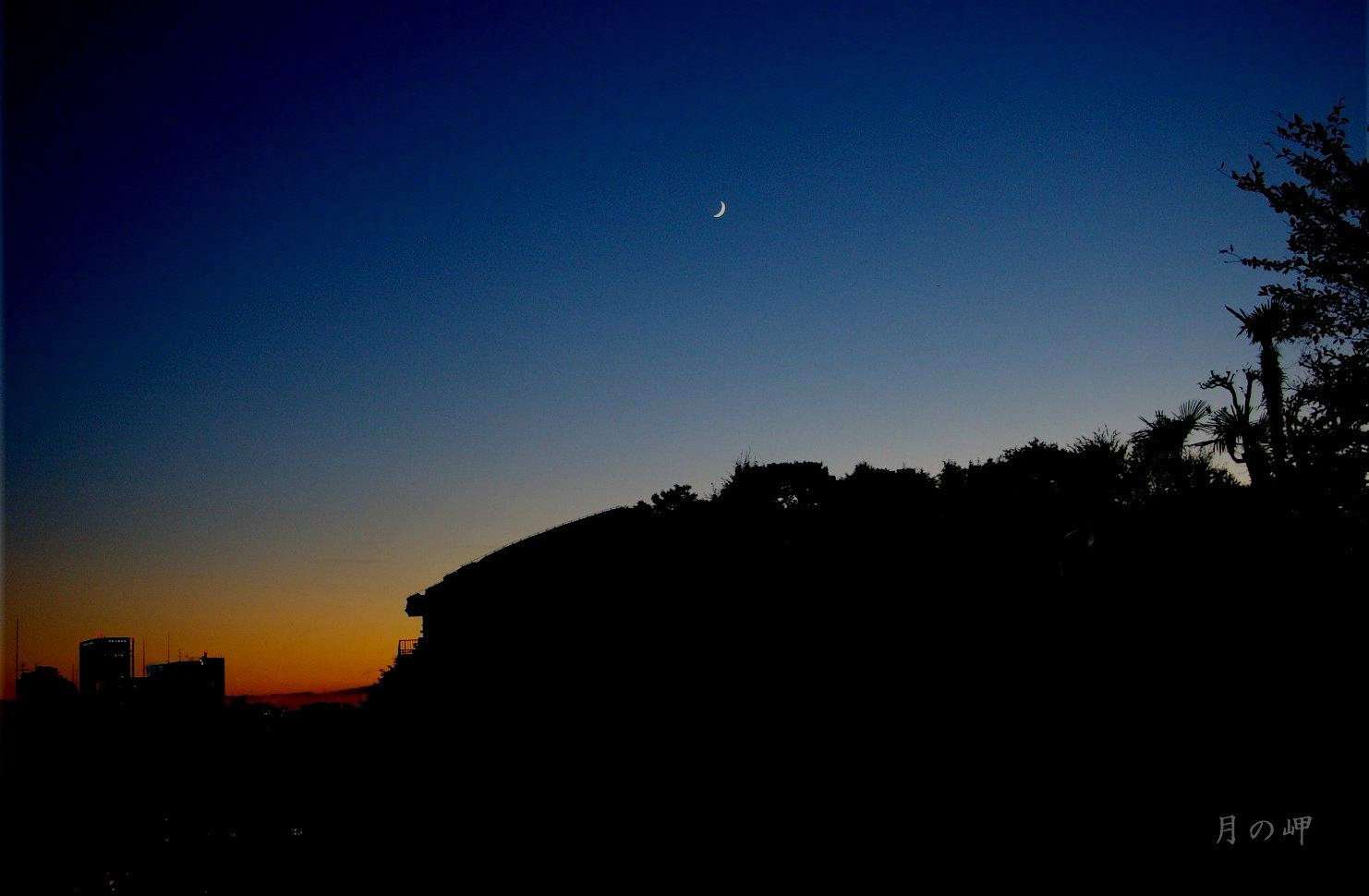
Modern Tsuki no Misaki

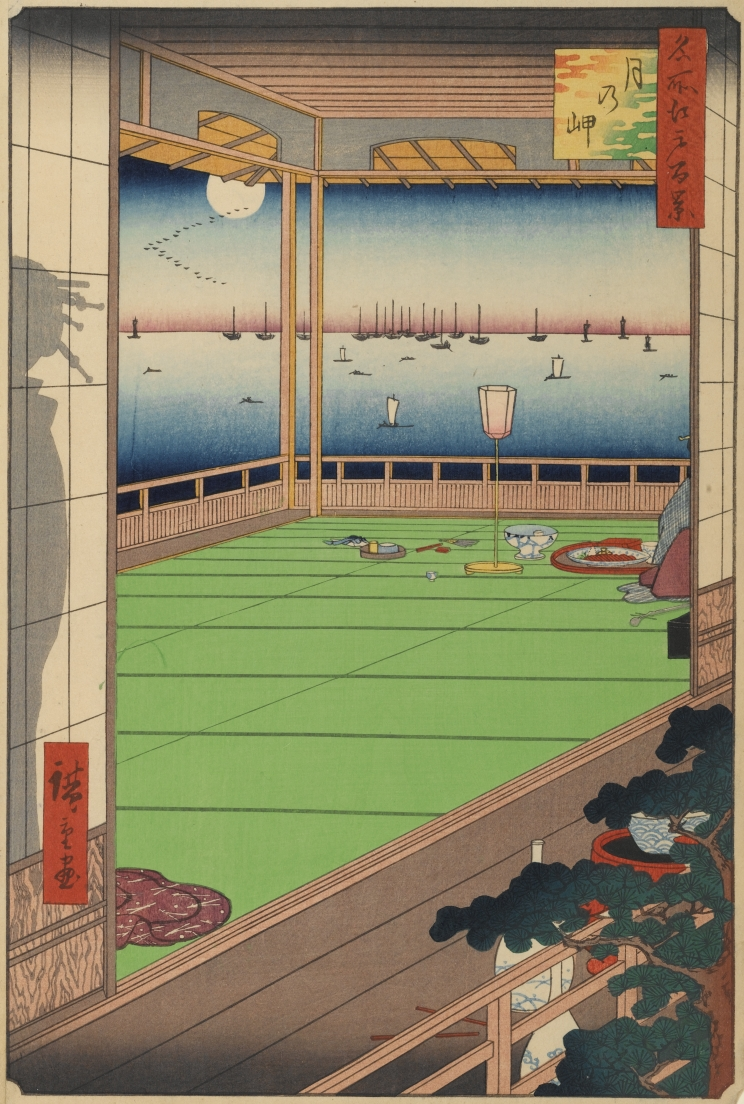
Painting by Hiroshige, Tsuki no Misaki, from One Hundred Famous Views of Edo

Tsuki no Misaki (月の岬 or 月の見崎), meaning "Headland of the Moon", was a name formerly in use for part of a plateau in Mita, Minato-ku, Tokyo, Japan. One explanation of the name is that it was considered a particularly good place to view the moon over what is now Tokyo Bay.

In the Edo period, it was well known as one of seven capes (七崎 Nanasaki) around the Edo area, the other six being Shiomizaki (潮見崎), Sodegazaki (袖が崎), Ōsaki (大崎), Kōranzaki (荒蘭崎), Chiyogasaki (千代が崎) and Chōnangasaki (長南が崎).

The name had become obsolete by the middle or late Meiji period, when references were made to the loss of the view due to new buildings.

Akimoto Chūnagon (秋元中納言) composed a tanka on Tsuki no Misaki:

秋ならば
月のみさきや
いかならん
名は夏山の
しげみのみして

Aki naraba
Tsuki no Misaki ya
Ikanaran
Na wa natsuyama no
Shigemi no mishite

There are some origin candidates for it, which might be originated from admiration of nice view including the moon:

- Tokugawa Ieyasu named it in Keichō era;
- it was a nearby place of a notice board set up at Mitadaicho (三田台町) 1-chome;
- formerly it was a name of the premises of Isarago (伊皿子), Daienji (大円寺), and then it was used for a neighborhood area.
- it was a generic name of Saikai-ji.

== Hiroshige ==
Japanese artist Hiroshige designed a couple of prints of the moon seen over the bay from within a tea-house or brothel on Tsuki no Misaki. Some doubt has been expressed as to whether these prints depict this location, or one at Yatsuyama (八つ山) in Shinagawa, but Yatsuyama was leveled and its soil was used to construct Daiba in the late Edo period.
