= Nagoya Shrine =

Shinto shrine in Japan

Nagoya Shrine (那古野神社, Nagoya-jinja)
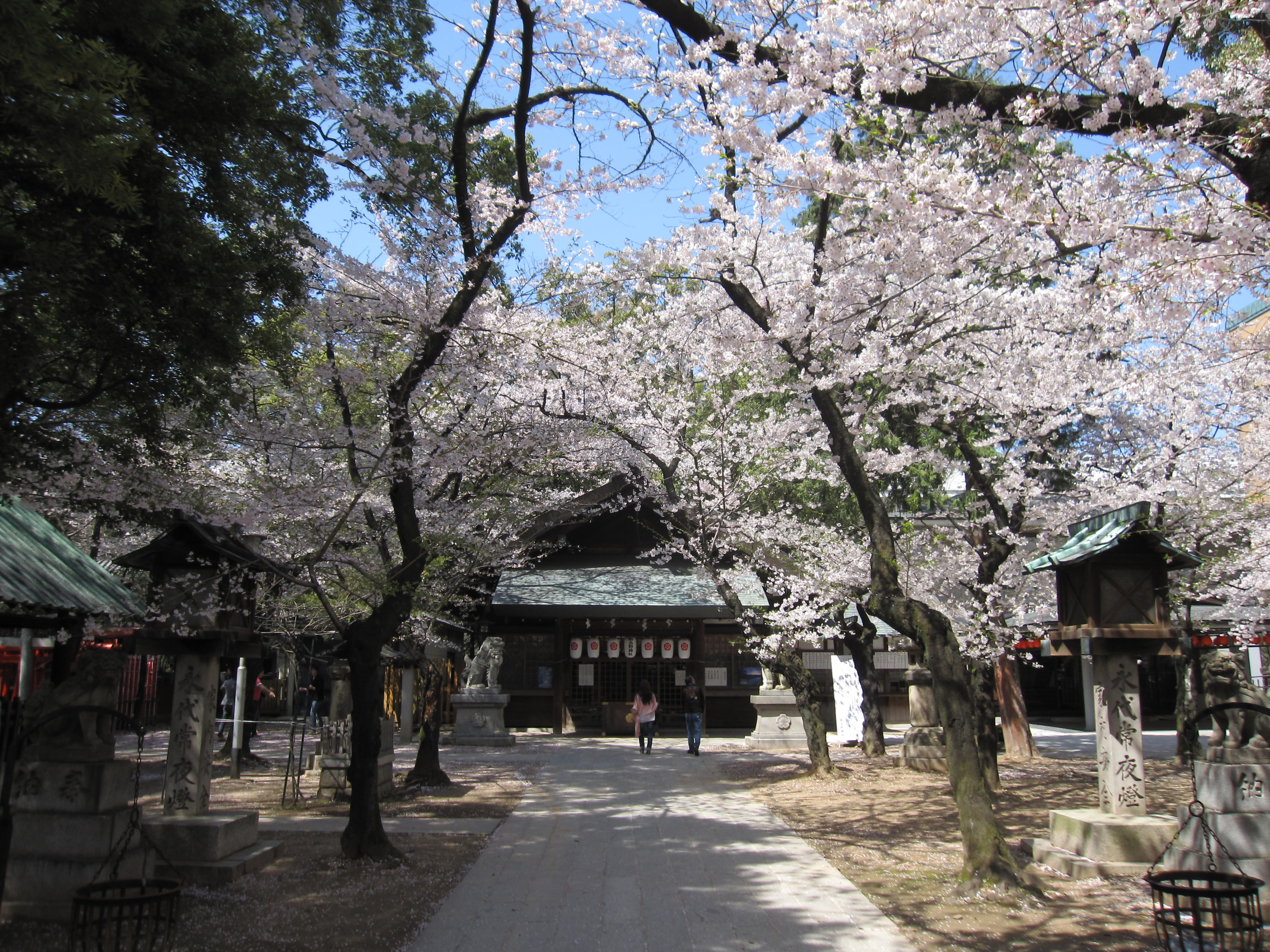
- Main hall of Nagoya Shrine during spring (2012)

- Location within Japan

Religion
- Affiliation: Shinto
- Deity: Susanoo

Location
- Location: Marunouchi in the Naka Ward in Nagoya, central Japan.
- Coordinates: 35°10′39″N 136°53′59″E

Architecture
- Established: 911

The Nagoya Shrine (那古野神社, Nagoya-jinja) is a Shinto shrine located in Marunouchi in the Naka Ward in Nagoya, central Japan.

== History ==
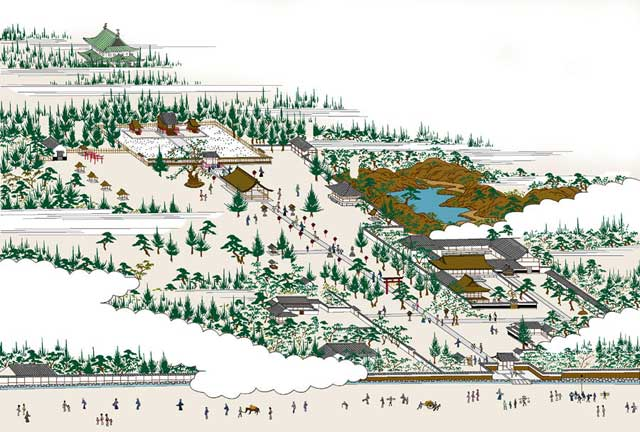
Depiction of the Tennōsha, from the Owari meisho zue, Edo period

It was established in the year 911 and is dedicated to the Shinto god Susanoo. Originally called Tennōsha (天王社), it was located south of Nagoya Castle next to the Nagoya Tōshō-gū (東照宮) and housed the guardian deity of the castle. It was moved to its present site in 1876, the past plot is now occupied by government buildings.

The Nagoya Shrine Tenno Festival is held every 15–16 July.
