= Natsue Washizu =

- 鷲津名都江
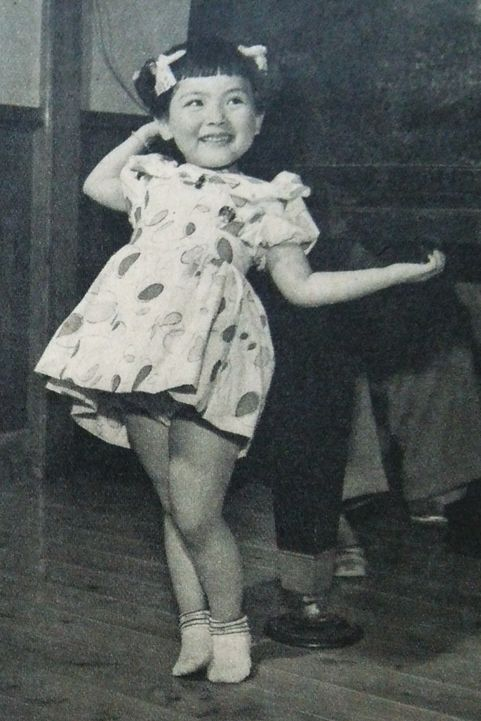
- Washizu in 1953
- Born: January 20, 1948 (age 78); Ichinomiya, Aichi Prefecture, Japan
- Other name: Kurumi Kobato
- Education: Aoyama Gakuin University; University of London (MA)
- Occupations: Academic, translator, singer, actress, voice actress
- Musical career
- Genres: Children's music
- Years active: 1952-1988, 2004-present
- Label: Victor Entertainment

Natsue Washizu (鷲津 名都江, Washizu Natsue; born January 20, 1948), professionally also known as Kurumi Kobato (小鳩 くるみ, Kobato Kurumi), is a Japanese academic, translator, singer, actress, television personality and voice actress.

Having debuted as a child singer and actress at the age of four in 1952, she subsequently signed with Victor Entertainment and acted in Japan's first television drama Ponpoko Monogatari. From 1964 to 1972, she was the "Onē-san" on Captain Doremifa and its successor Nakayoshi Rhythm. As a voice actress, she portrayed Kozue Ayuhara in the anime Attack No. 1 and Snow White in the Japanese dub of Snow White and the Seven Dwarfs.

Washizu later became a professor of British and American literature at Mejiro University and professor of linguistic and cultural studies at Mejiro University Graduate School. In 2004, she returned on television in Yōkoso! Mother Goose no sekai he to talk about her research.

== Early life ==
Washizu was born on January 20, 1948, in Ichinomiya, Aichi Prefecture. Her family ran a private school of Confucian and Chinese studies in Ichinomiya that her family had established in the Edo period. Her great-grandfather Washizu Yōshō was the granduncle of writer Kafū Nagai. Scholar Washizu Kidō was her great-granduncle.

At the age of three, Washizu participated in the NHK Nagoya's singing contest Koe-Kurabe Ude-Kurabe Kodomo Ongakkai and was the only one selected out of 47 contestants. She was recommended to take singing lessons to become a children's singer, and moved to Tokyo to study at Kurumi Art School. She later used the school's name "Kurumi" in her professional name "Kurumi Kobato".

== Entertainment career ==
In October 1952, at the age of four, Washizu debuted as a singer under the name Kurumi Kobato at Nihon Gekijō's Aki no Odori, as the youngest singer in the history of Nihon Gekijō. From December of the same year, she appeared on Chienowa Club on Radio Tokyo as a children's singer, and when this program was transferred to Radio Tokyo TV with the establishment of the TV station, she became the host, appearing regularly for 16 years until March 1968, when the program was terminated. In 1953, she signed with Victor Entertainment.

While in elementary school between 1955 and 1961, she was the cover girl of the magazine Nakayoshi, and acted in the Japan's first television drama Ponpoko Monogatari on Radio Tokyo TV and the television drama series Donguri Nikki on Nippon TV.

From 1964 to 1966, when she was a high school student, she was the Onē-san on Captain Doremifa on NHK Educational, which became a regular program, and appeared as the first Onē-san on Nakayoshi Rhythm, the successor program of Captain Doremifa, from 1966 to 1972 after entering university.

From April 1972 to March 1974, she appeared on Okāsan to issho on NHK as Uta no Onē-san. She was also the host of the talk and variety show Afternoon Show on TV Asahi.

As a voice actress, Washizu voiced the character Kozue Ayuhara, the heroine of the anime Attack No. 1 aired on Fuji TV. In 1980, she voiced Snow White, the main character in the Disney film Snow White and the Seven Dwarfs. She was chosen as the voice actress for Snow White for her non-classic singing style and young-sounding singing voice.

From 1976 to 1986, she appeared on Otassha desuka, and for ten years served as the host of Otassha Club, the first TV program for the elderly in Japan, aired on NHK Educational.

Washizu was awarded the 17th Kurushima Takehiko Culture Prize in 1978. In 1983, she was awarded Japan Children's Song Award, Special Award.

When Otassha Club was reorganized in its 11th year, Washizu decided to study in the United Kingdom when her regular program ended for the first time since her debut at the age of four.

In 2004, Washizu made a return to the television on Yōkoso! Mother Goose no sekai he, that was aired from December 2004 to January 2005 on NHK Educational, in which she lectured about her research on English nursery rhymes.

By 2015, she used her professional name "Kurumi Kobato" when voice acting the Disney character Snow White.

== Academic career ==
In 1970, Washizu graduated from Aoyama Gakuin University, Department of British and American Literature. Washizu became interested in children's education during her time on Nakayoshi Rhythm, and moved to the Faculty of Education from the Department of British and American Literature. She graduated in 1980, earning licenses as a kindergarten and elementary school teacher. In 1982, she finished the Graduate School of Aoyama Gakuin University, Pedagogical Research Program. Her English teacher had told her that she "is better suited to educate children than appear on the screen", which further motivated her to pursue an academic career.

In April 1985, she became a part-time lecturer of English literature at Mejiro University College, and the next year she was appointed assistant professor of English literature. There, she conducted research on Mother Goose, the ancient English nursery rhymes. From September 1986 to 1990, she studied in the United Kingdom, graduating as M.A. from the University of London. After returning to Japan and marrying, she did not resume her performing activities and devoted herself to teaching and research until 2004, when she made a return on television. As a researcher, she has published many books.

In 2015, Washizu was professor of British and American literature at Mejiro University and professor of linguistic and cultural studies at Mejiro University Graduate School.

== Discography ==
=== Studio albums ===
- <COLEZO!TWIN> Kobato Kurumi Best Nihon no Aishōka (2005)
- Yomō Utaō! Mother Goose (2008)

=== Digital albums ===
- Kobato Kurumi Best Collection - Attack NO.1 no uta～Kodomo no uta (2019)
- Kobato Kurumi Best Collection - Ōkina kuri no ki no shitade～Sekai no kodomo no uta (2019)
- Kobato Kurumi Best Collection - Yūyake koyake～Dōyō Meiykokushū (2019)
- Aishiki uta (2019)
- Kokoro no uta (2019)

== Appearances ==
=== TV drama ===
- Kodomo no jikan (1953) as Kurumi-chan
- Shiki no kodomotachi - Warabeuta Emaki (1954)
- Kingyo no otomodachi (1955)
- Donguri Nikki (1956-1957) as lead
- Kurumi no tanabata matsuri (1956)
- Ponpoko Monogatari (1957-1958) as lead
- Kodomo no Fantasy - E wo kaku kodomo (1959)
- Okonomi nichiyōza (1959) as Mago
- Tetsudō Kōan (1963) as Kumi

=== TV anime ===
- Attack No. 1 (1969) as Kozue Ayuhara
- Akadō Suzunosuke (1972) as Sayuri

=== Anime films ===
- Attack No. 1 (1970) as Kozue Ayuhara
- Attack No. 1 Namida no Kaiten Receive (1970) as Kozue Ayuhara
- Attack No. 1 Namida no Sekai Senshuken (1970) as Kozue Ayuhara
- 30,000 Miles Under the Sea (1970) as Angel
- Attack No. 1 Namida no Phoenix (1971) as Kozue Ayuhara
- The Three Musketeers in Boots (1972) as Annie
- Snow White and the Seven Dwarfs (1980) as Snow White
- Sofia the First (2013) as Snow White
- Ralph Breaks the Internet (2018) as Snow White

=== Film ===
- Kono yo no hana - Kanketsuhen (1956) as Kyōko

=== Video games ===
- CR Pachinko Attack No. 1 (2007) as Kozue Ayuhara
- KINGDOM HEARTS Birth by Sleep (2010) as Snow White
- Kinect: Disneyland Adventures (2011) as Snow White

=== Television ===
- Captain Doremifa (1964-1966) as Onē-san
- Nakayoshi Rhythm (1966-1972) as Onē-san
- Eikaiwa Shokyū (1968) as hostess of Kiyotada Tazaki
- Seikai nai Quiz (1979-1980) as regular panelist
- Otassha Club (1980-1988) as host
- NHK Ningen Kōza: Yōkoso! Mother Goose no sekai he (2004-2005) as lecturer

=== Radio ===
- Doyōbi desu Ohayō Ōzawa Yūri desu (1973-1979) as assistant
- Ōzawa Yūri no nonbiri waido (1979-1983) as partner
- Eigo monoshiri club (2008) as August guest lecturer
