= Washizu Kidō =

Japanese scholar and samurai (1825–1882)

Washizu Kidō (鷲津 毅堂, December 17, 1825 - October 5, 1882) was a Japanese scholar, samurai and government official from the Owari Domain. He served as Vice-Governor of Tome Prefecture. His imina is Norimitsu.

Writer Kafū Nagai was his grandson. Scholar Natsue Washizu, who is also a singer and actress under the name Kurumi Kobato, is the great-granddaughter of Kidō's younger brother Yōshō.

== Life ==
Washizu Kidō was born on December 17, 1825, in Niwa, Niwa, Owari Province (present-day Niwa, Ichinomiya, Aichi Prefecture). The Washizu family had been samurai for generations. He had a younger brother called Yōshō. His great-grandfather Washizu Yūrin was a Confucian scholar.

In 1845, he entered the Shōheizaka School in Edo.

Through the recommendation by the domain's foot soldier (ashigaru) commander, he was appointed school inspector at Meirindō School in 1867. The next year, he was appointed chief of assistants to the lord and steward of women's quarters. He was also appointed as a government official in the newly established office of the President of the Government.

In 1869, he was appointed Junior Secretary of the Daigakkō (present-day University of Tokyo) and Vice-Governor of Tome Prefecture in Rikuzen Province. He was then moved to the Ministry of Justice and appointed Judge of Religious Proclamation in 1871.

In 1881, he became a member of the Tokyo Academy.

Kidō died on October 5, 1882, at the age of 56. He was awarded the court rank of Senior Fifth Rank posthumously in 1915.

His second daughter Tsune married poet and bureaucrat Nagai Kyūichirō.

== Genealogy ==
Regarding the origin of the Washizu clan, a tablet inscription recorded by Mishima Chūshū states, "[The clan] begins from Agatanushi Inamaro. Inamaro's descendant Jirō Saemonjō-no-jō Naomitsu became the jitō of Chita District. Thus, [he] made [this his] surname. A descendant several generations later, Jinzaemon imina Shigemitsu, moved and lives in the current village. He is the 9th generation from the patriarch."

According to Owari Meishozue, "There are people of the Washizu clan in this village [Niwa]. They are descendants of Taishu Toki Mino-no-kami Yorinari [Toki Yorinari] from the former Mino Province. In the 11th year of Tenbun, they were attacked by the Saitō clan and came and took refuge in this land. After several generations since that time, the clan head during Kansei was called Yūrin, erudite and multi-talented with many students, he made a name at one point."

A family tree stored by the Washizu family in Shitaya, Tokyo states, "The shintai of Niwa Shrine in Niwa District and Futoshi Shrine in Nakajima District, Nakano-omiko-gami-no-mikoto, was the founder, the long descendancy became ryōshi [territorial governors] or dairyō [highest rank of a district governor] for generations. . . . In the 8th month of the 5th year of Jōgan, Toshiyuki, a third generation descendant of dairyōji-appointed Yoshikazu, used Washizu as a surname for the first time. . . . Washizu Kyūzō Munenori served Maeda Toshiie in the 8th month of the 13th year of Tenshō in the war in Etchū Province, after being severely wounded, he distinguished himself in the Battle of Shizugatake. A descendant of Kyūzō Munenori was called Washizu Chōuemon Mitsutoshi. After Chōuemon Mitsutoshi, there is a similarly named Chōuemon Mitsutoshi, which [the name] continued for two generations, and his second son was the scholar Washizu Yūrin. Kidō is the great-grandson of Yūrin."

Comparing the table inscription recorded by Mishima Chūshū, the Owari Meishozue and the Washizu family tree of Shitaya, both similarities and differences can be seen.
