= Hasegawa Settan =

Japanese artist

Hasegawa Settan (長谷川雪旦, 1778–1843) was a Japanese artist who lived during the late Edo period, born in Edo.

His given name was Munehide (宗秀), and his art-name was Gengakusai Ichiyōsai (巌岳斎 一陽庵). He was commonly called Gotō Uzaemon (後藤右衛門). He was originally a wood sculptor and he carved the woodblocks for many ukiyo-e prints. The Edo meisho zue, an illustrated catalogue of the sights of Edo for which he provided in the woodcuts, is one of his major works. For his artistic accomplishments, Hasegawa Settan was awarded the honorary Buddhist title Hokkyō (法橋 "Bridge of the Dharma").

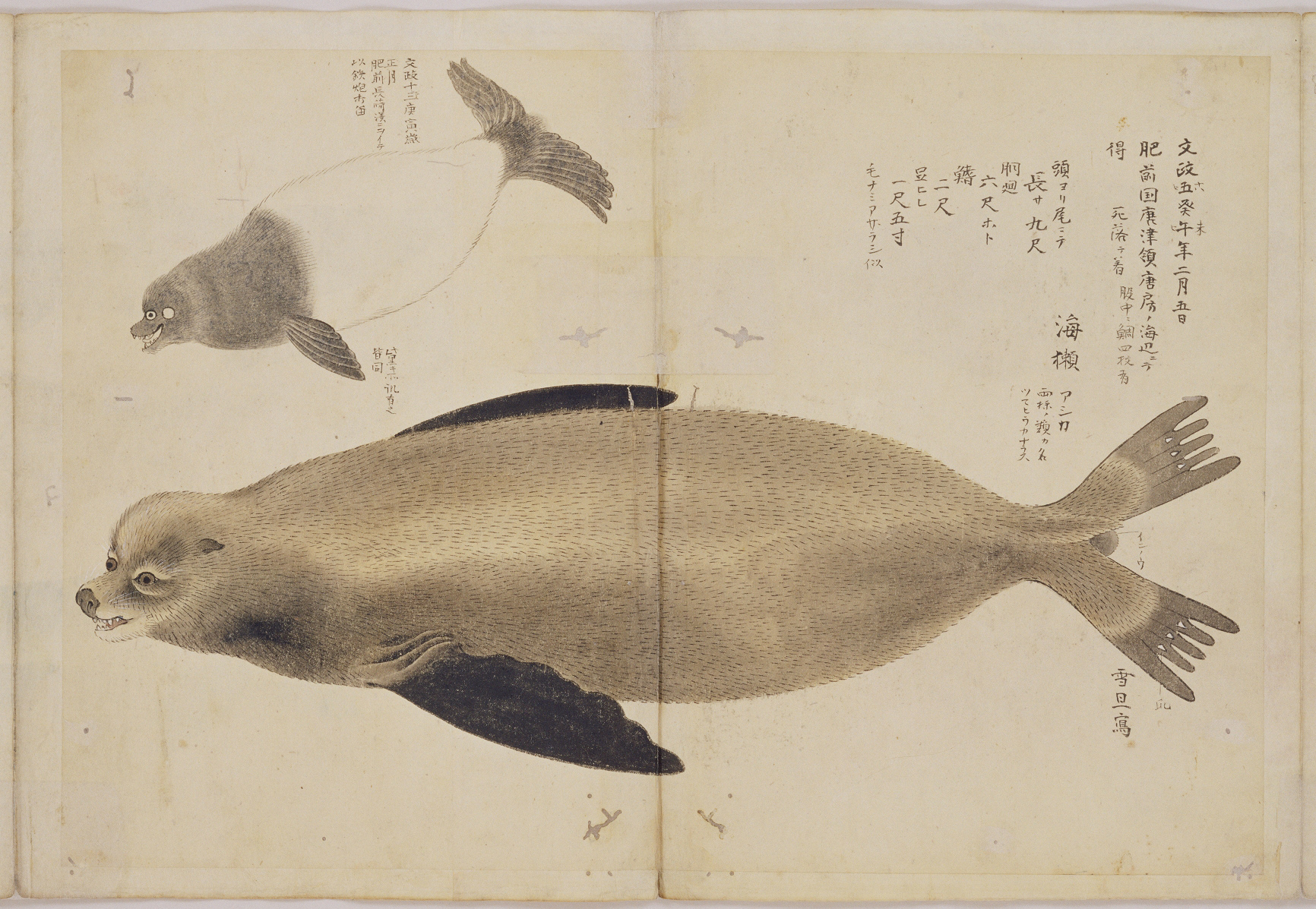
Drawing of a seal that washed up on a beach near Karatsu

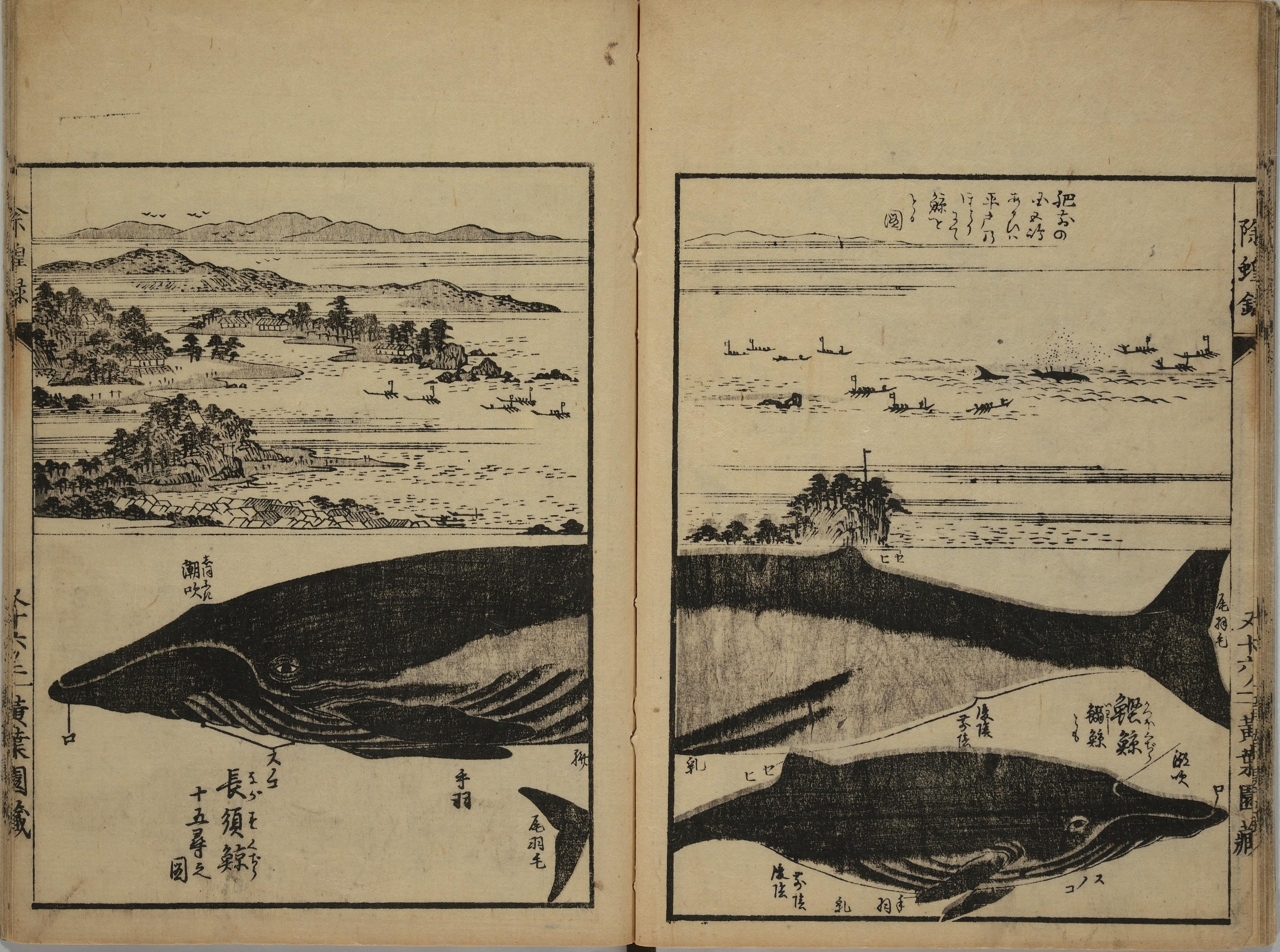

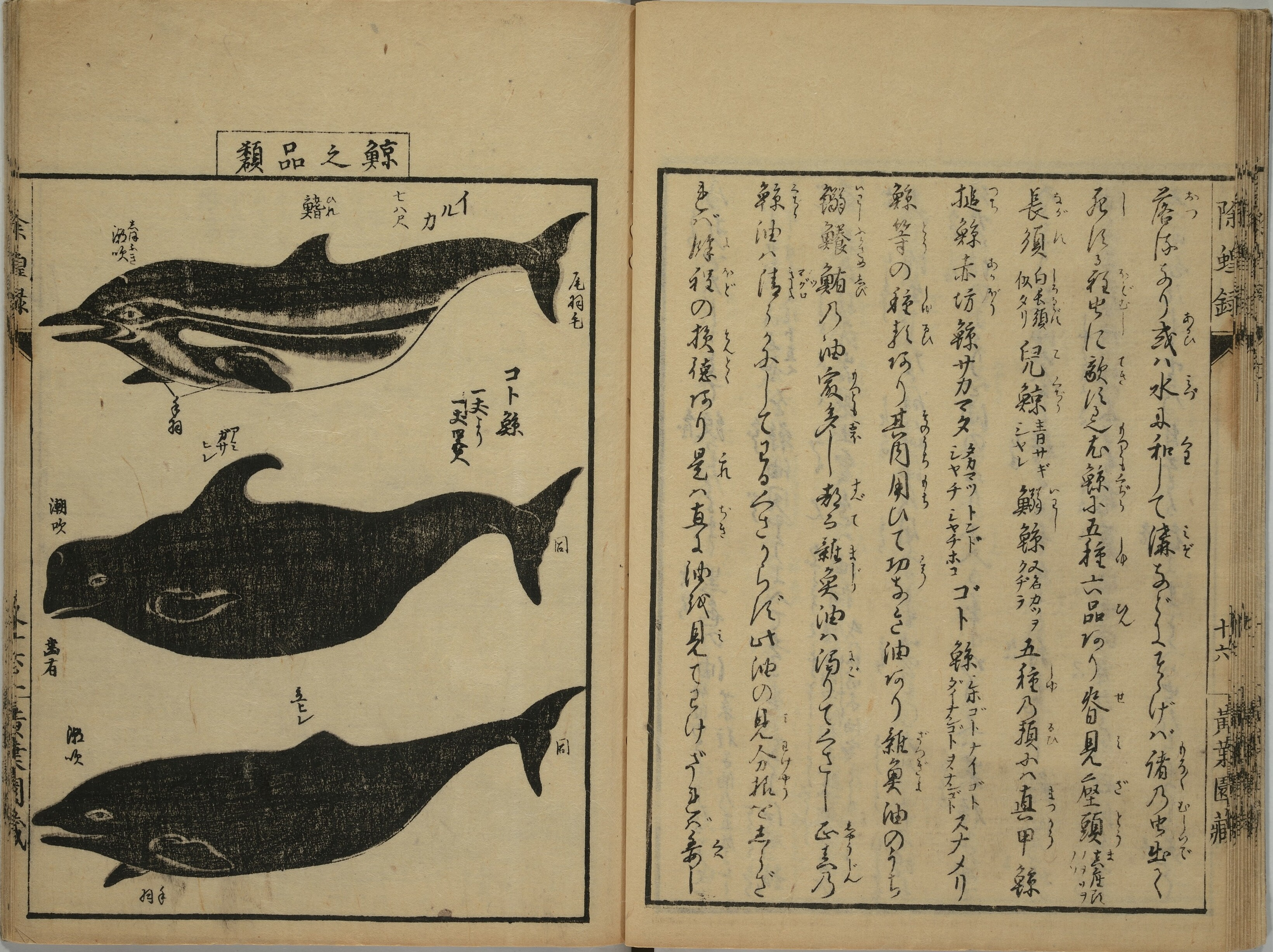

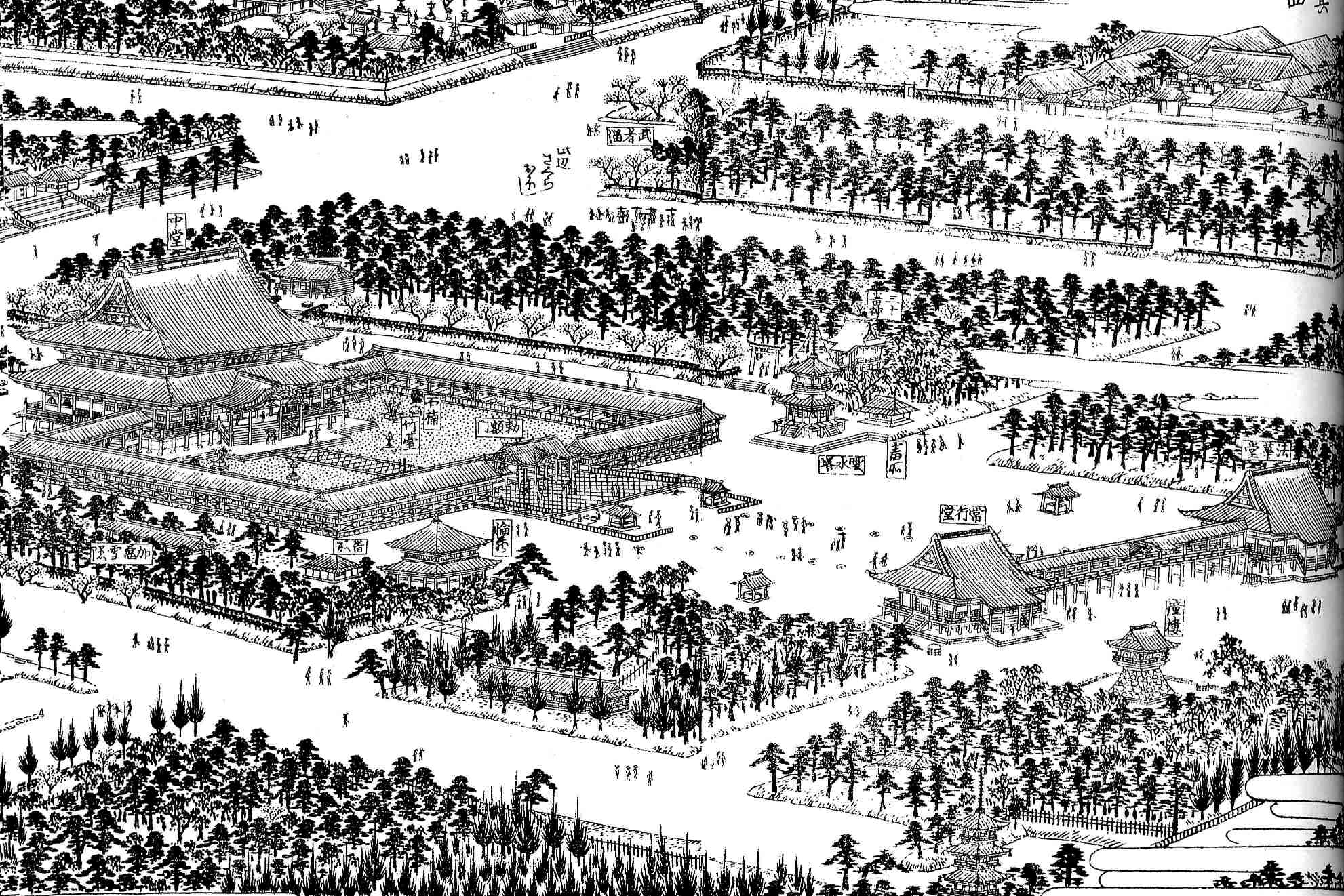

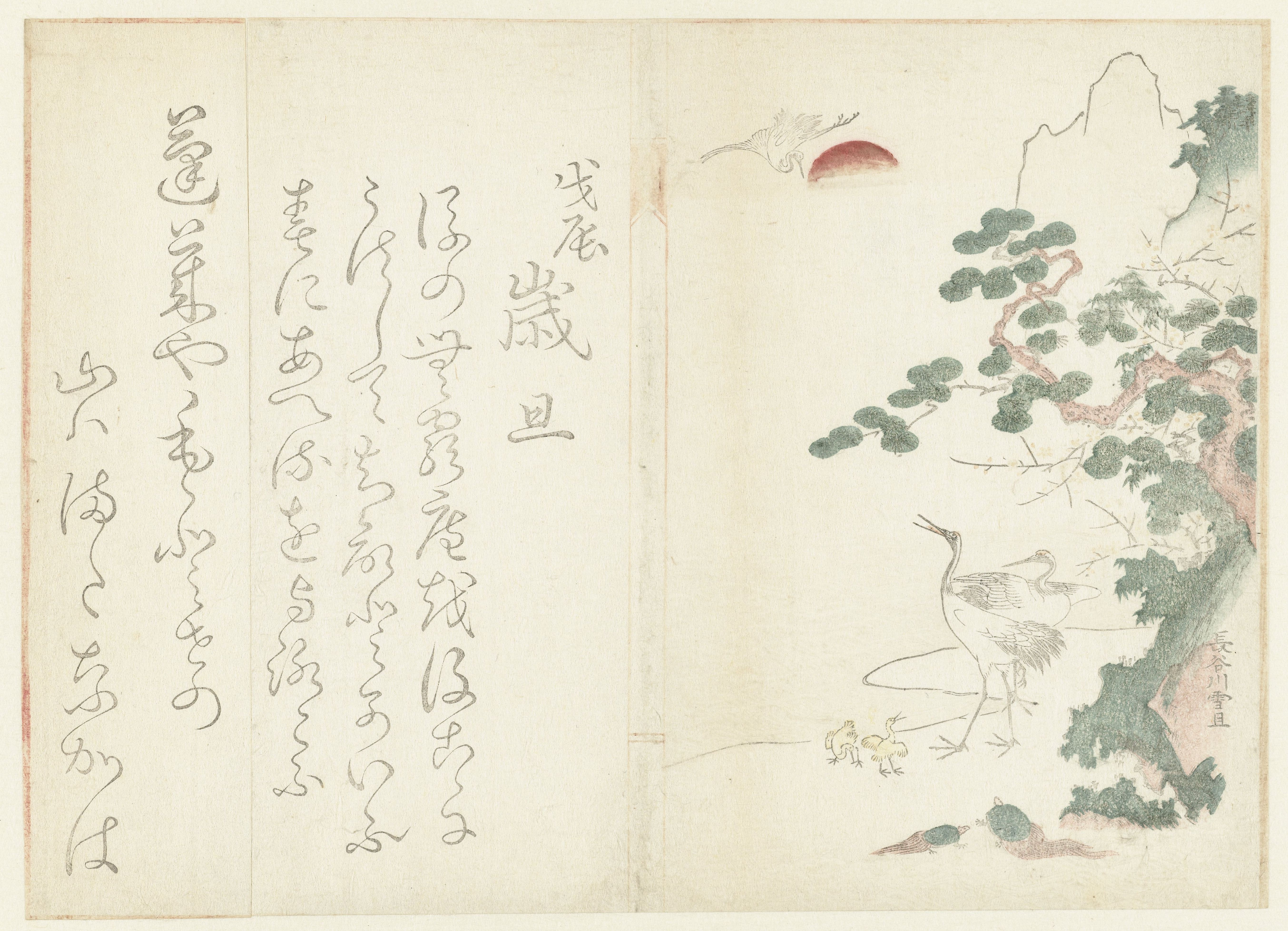

== Sources ==
- Douglas, R. K. (1897). "Japanese Illustrated Books". In Pollard, Alfred William (ed.). Bibliographica. Kegan Paul, Trench, Trübner. pp. 1–29.
- Goree, Robert (2017). "Meisho zue and the Mapping of Prosperity in Late Tokugawa Japan" (PDF). Cross-Currents: East Asian History and Culture Review. 6 (2): 404–439. doi:10.1353/ach.2017.0023. ISSN 2158-9674.
