= Edo meisho zue =

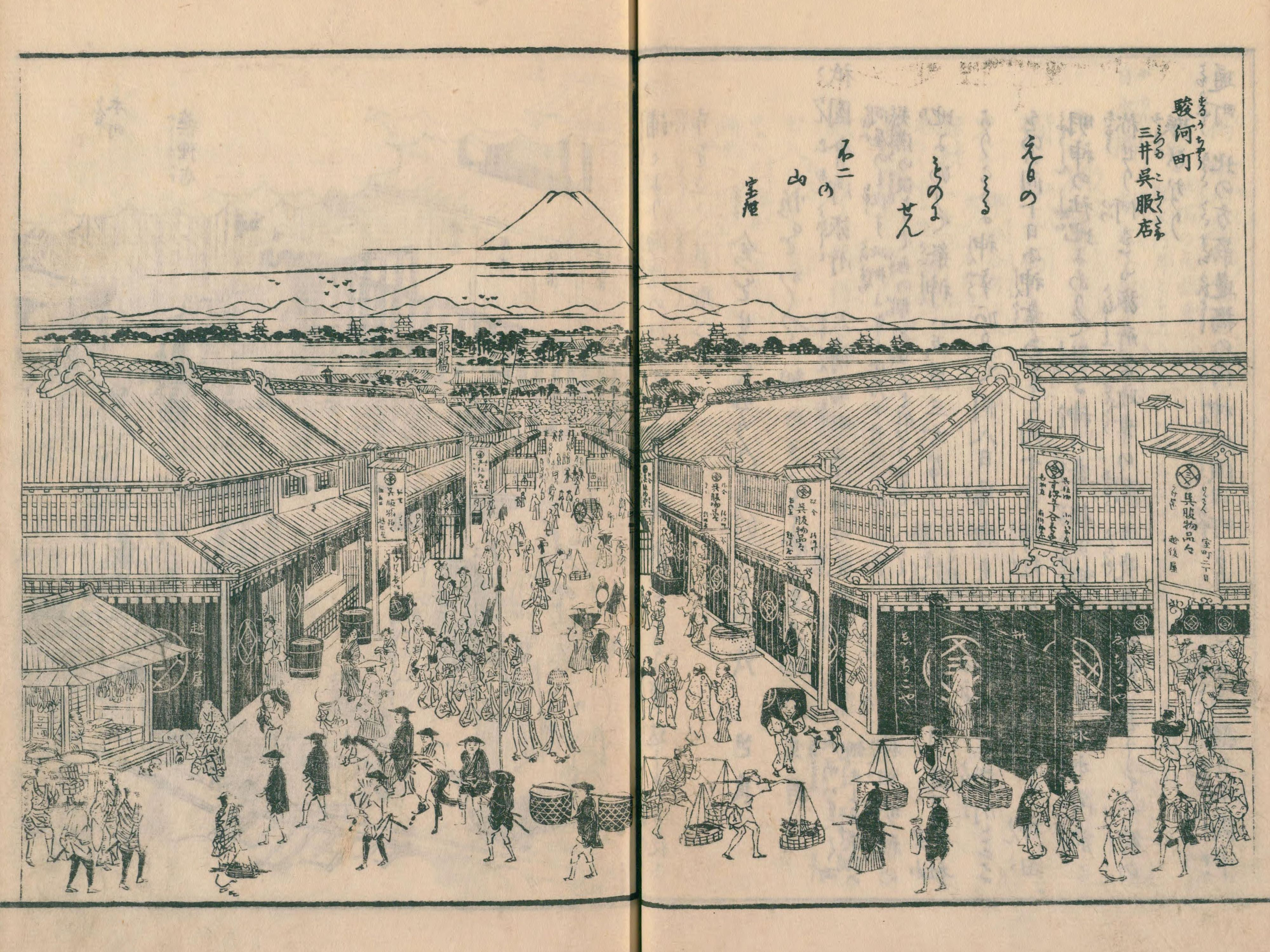
Scene from the Edo meisho Zue depicting Suruga-chō, illustration by Hasegawa Settan

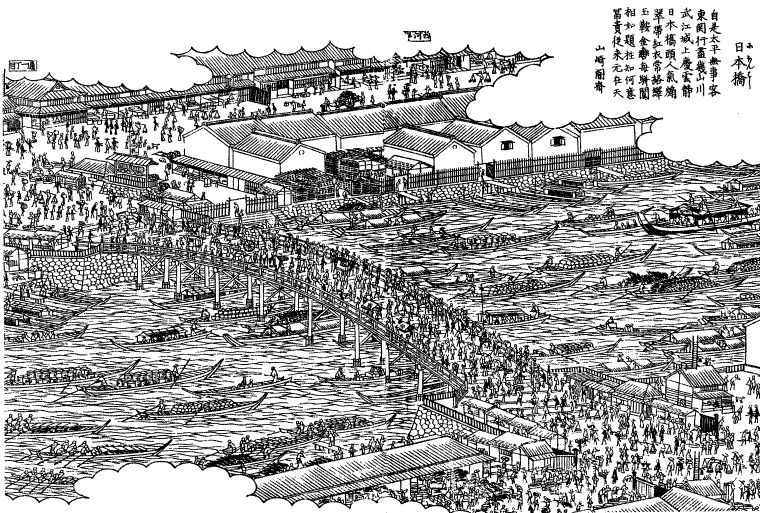
Scene of Nihonbashi area

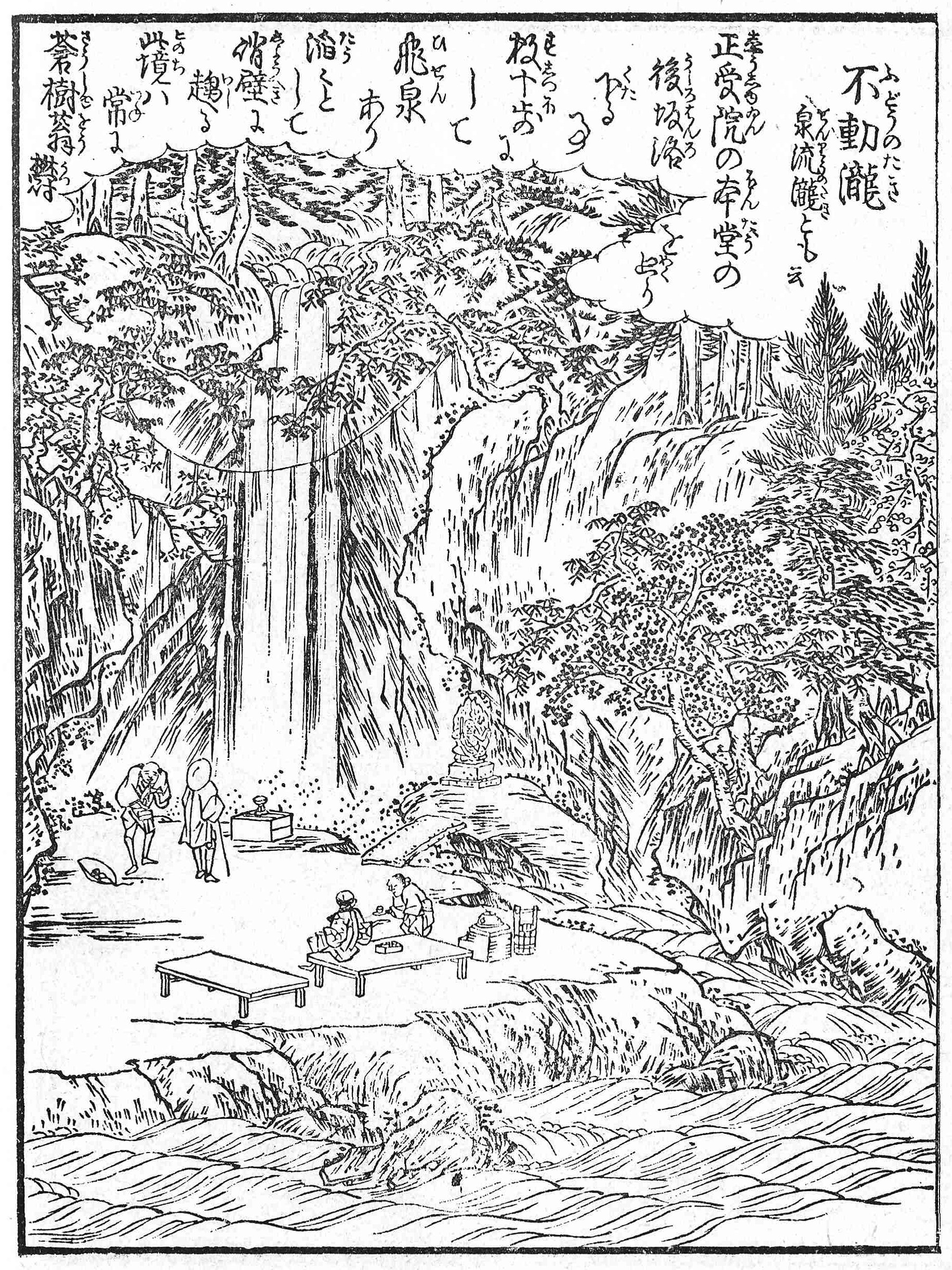
Scene of Fudo Waterfall

Edo meisho zue (江戸名所図会; "Guide to famous Edo sites") is an illustrated guide describing famous places, called meisho, and depicting their scenery in pre-1868 Tokyo, then known as Edo. It was printed using Japanese woodblock printing techniques in 20 books divided among seven volumes. Initially published in 1834 (volumes 1–3, 10 books) and republished in 1836 (volumes 4–7, all 20 books) with slight revisions—i.e., all during the late Edo period (1603–1867), it became an immediate hit and prompted a “boom” in the publication of further meisho zue (“famous site guides”).

== History ==
It took form over a span of more than 40 years. It was conceived by Saitō Gesshin (1737–1799) who, influenced by the proliferation of famous site guides about places in Japan's Kansai region, decided Edo needed one, too. He is thought to have begun work around 1791 and is known to have gotten permission to publish and written a foreword, but he died before he could finish. From this point forward, Yukio's son-in-law Saitō Yukitaka Agatamaro (1772–1818) began work, undertaking new research to add new sites and re-researching other information; but he, too, died suddenly shortly before he could complete his task. Yukitaka's son, Saitō Yukinari Gesshin (1804–1878), was only 15 at the time, so he was not able to take up immediately where his father had left off; nonetheless, Yukinari was determined to complete his father's and grandfather's labor of love. When he finally managed to bring all the research, writing, editing, and correcting to fruition in 1834, he delivered to the public an innovative and highly detailed human geography that even today serves as a valuable resource for academic and hobby historians of late–Edo-period Tokyo.

It was illustrated by Hasegawa Settan (1778–1843). His illustrations are credited with contributing as much to the work's fame and long popularity—people still refer to it today for walking tours of historical sites—as the prose itself.

== Content ==
The account starts by explaining the history of Musashi Province, the settlement of Edo, and the founding of the Edo Castle, then it moves on to describe the city and its surroundings block by block, town by town, in a manner reminiscent of a walk-through of each area with stops at famous sites. The descriptions often include information about the origins of the place or site's name and its history, as well as quotations from well-known works of literature (such as Matsuo Bashō’s haiku) that mention it.

Approximately 60 percent of the sites described are Buddhist temples and Shinto shrines, with the remaining entries covering a wide range of other subjects. The work later influenced Hiroshige's choice of locations for his print series Meisho Edo Hyakkei (One Hundred Famous Views of Edo).

In overall scope, Edo Meishō Zue goes beyond the confines of the Edo proper and includes descriptions and illustrations of surrounding areas as well, venturing as far away as today's Hino to the west, Funabashi to the east, Ōmiya to the north, and Yokohama to the south.

== See also ==
- Owari meisho zue
