= Nagoya Tōshō-gū =

Shinto shrine in central Nagoya, Aichi Prefecture, Japan

Nagoya Tōshō-gū 名古屋東照宮
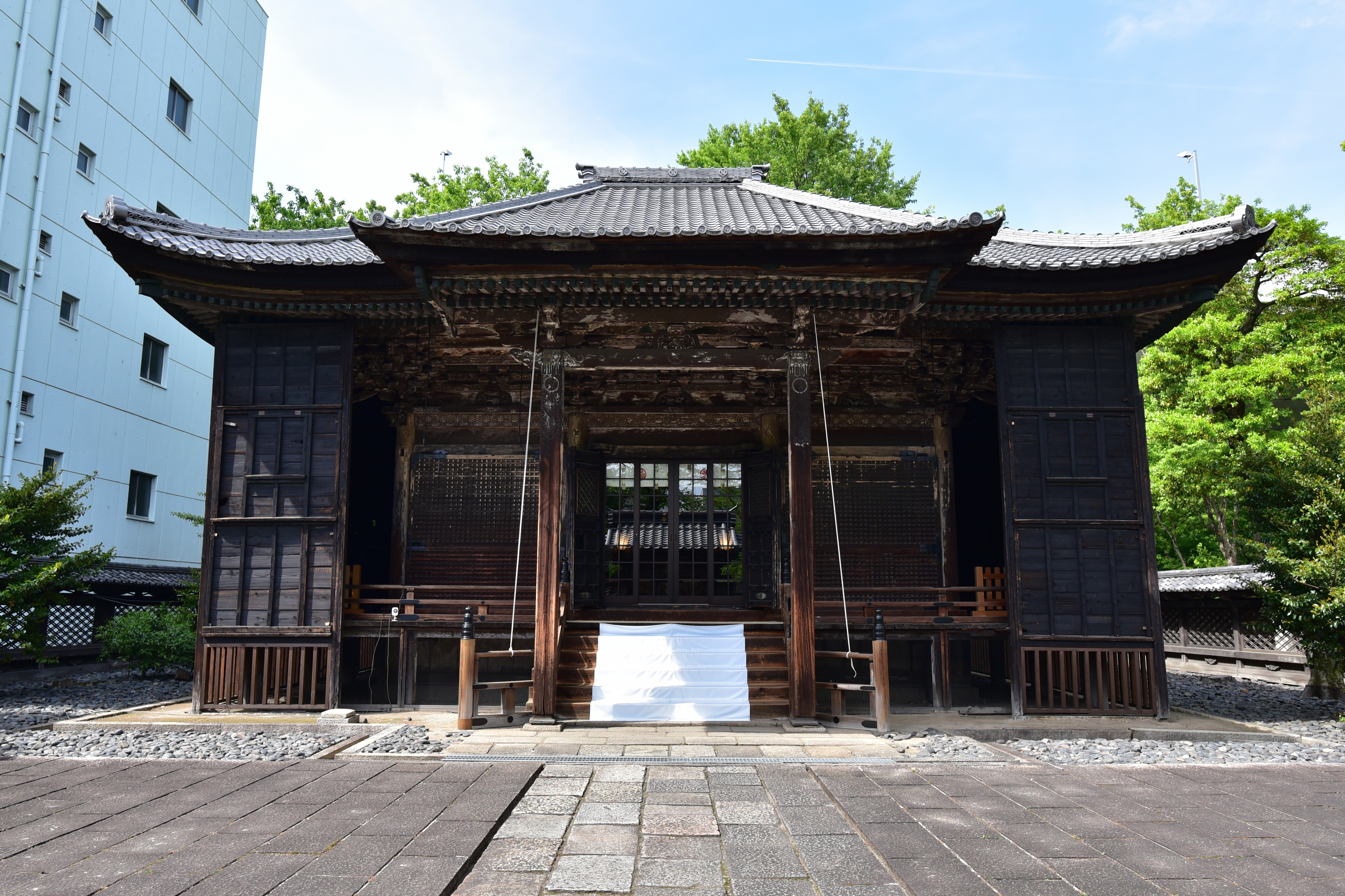
- Main hall of Nagoya Tōshō-gū

- Nagoya Tōshō-gū Nagoya Tōshō-gū (Japan)

Religion
- Affiliation: Shinto
- Deity: Tokugawa Ieyasu
- Festival: April 16–17
- Type: Tōshō-gū

Location
- Location: Nagoya, Aichi Prefecture, Japan.
- Coordinates: 35°10′39.2″N 136°53′57.5″E

Architecture
- Style: gongen-zukuri
- Founder: Tokugawa Yoshinao
- Established: 1619

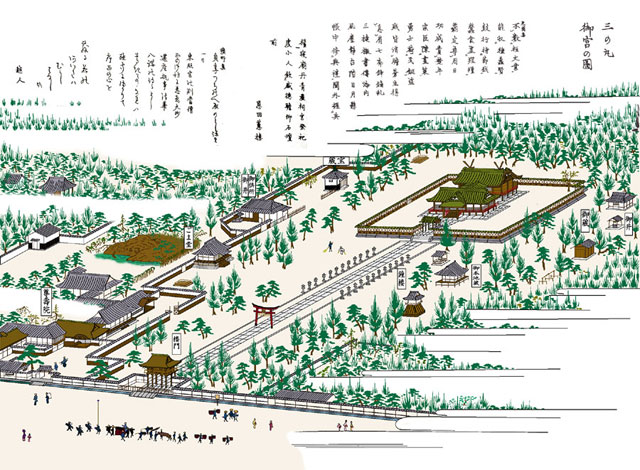
Depiction of the Tōshō-gū, from the Owari meisho zue, Edo period

Nagoya Tōshō-gū (名古屋東照宮) is the memorial shrine of Tokugawa Ieyasu located in the Marunouchi district of Naka-ku, Nagoya, Aichi Prefecture, Japan.

== History ==
The first lord of Owari Domain, Tokugawa Yoshinao, constructed this shrine to the spirit of his father, Tokugawa Ieyasu, in 1619, two years after the construction of Nikkō Tōshō-gū. It was located outside Nagoya Castle in the Sannomaru enceinte, next to the Tennosha (today's Nagoya Shrine). The shrine was assigned estates of 1000 koku for its upkeep, and was constructed in the Gongen-zukuri style with a Honden, connecting corridor (stone corridor), and worship hall, also featured a rōmon tower gate, a Karamon Chinese-style gate, and a prayer hall. Contemporary accounts state that it was adorned with vibrant colors and decorations similar to that of the Nikkō Tōshō-gū.

The Nagoya Tōshō-gū Festival was the biggest festival in Nagoya before the Second World War. The annual festival is held on April 16 and 17 and traditionally featured floats carrying mechanical puppets. By 1707, nine such floats were recorded.

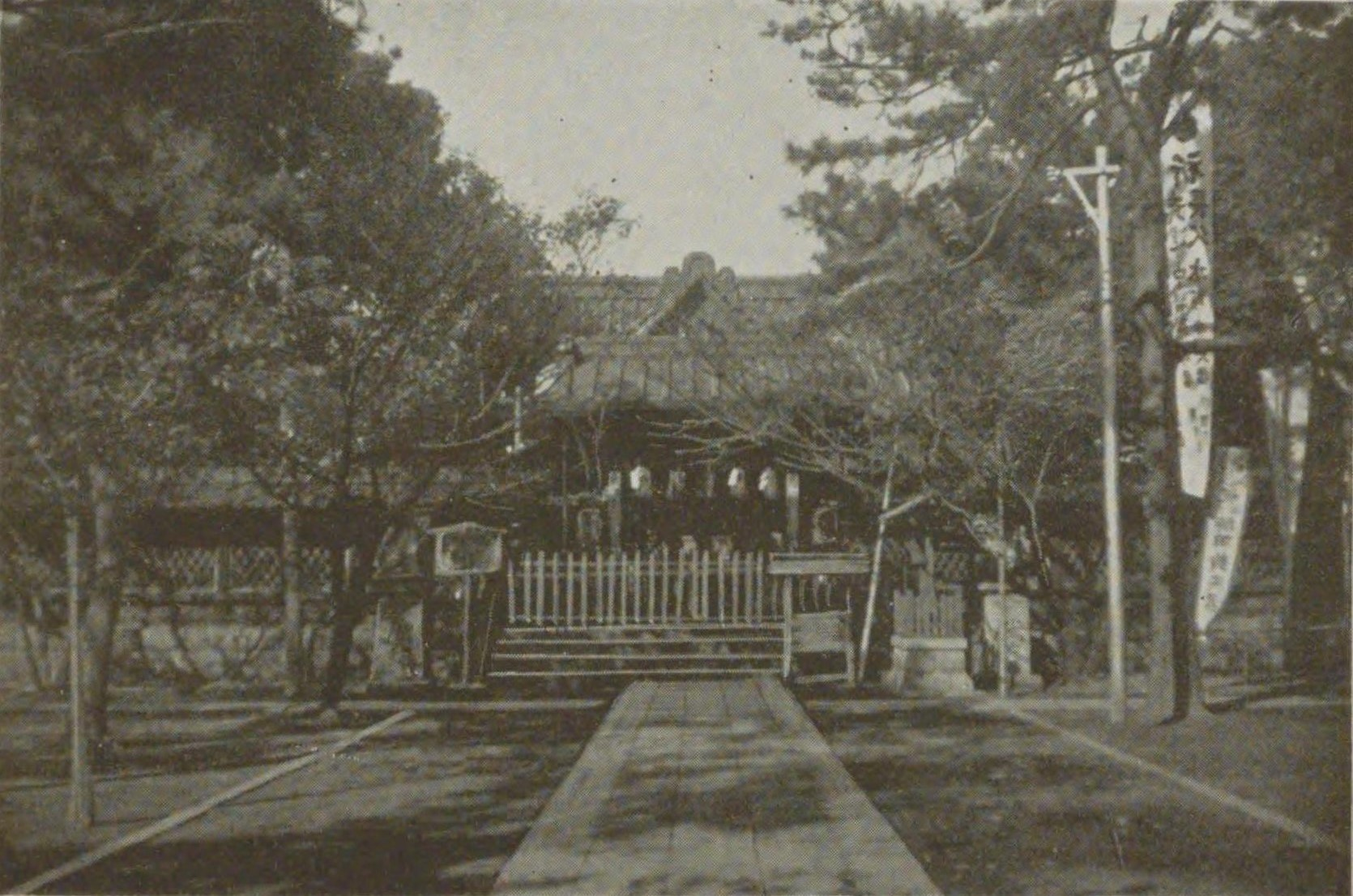
Honden (pre-WW-II)

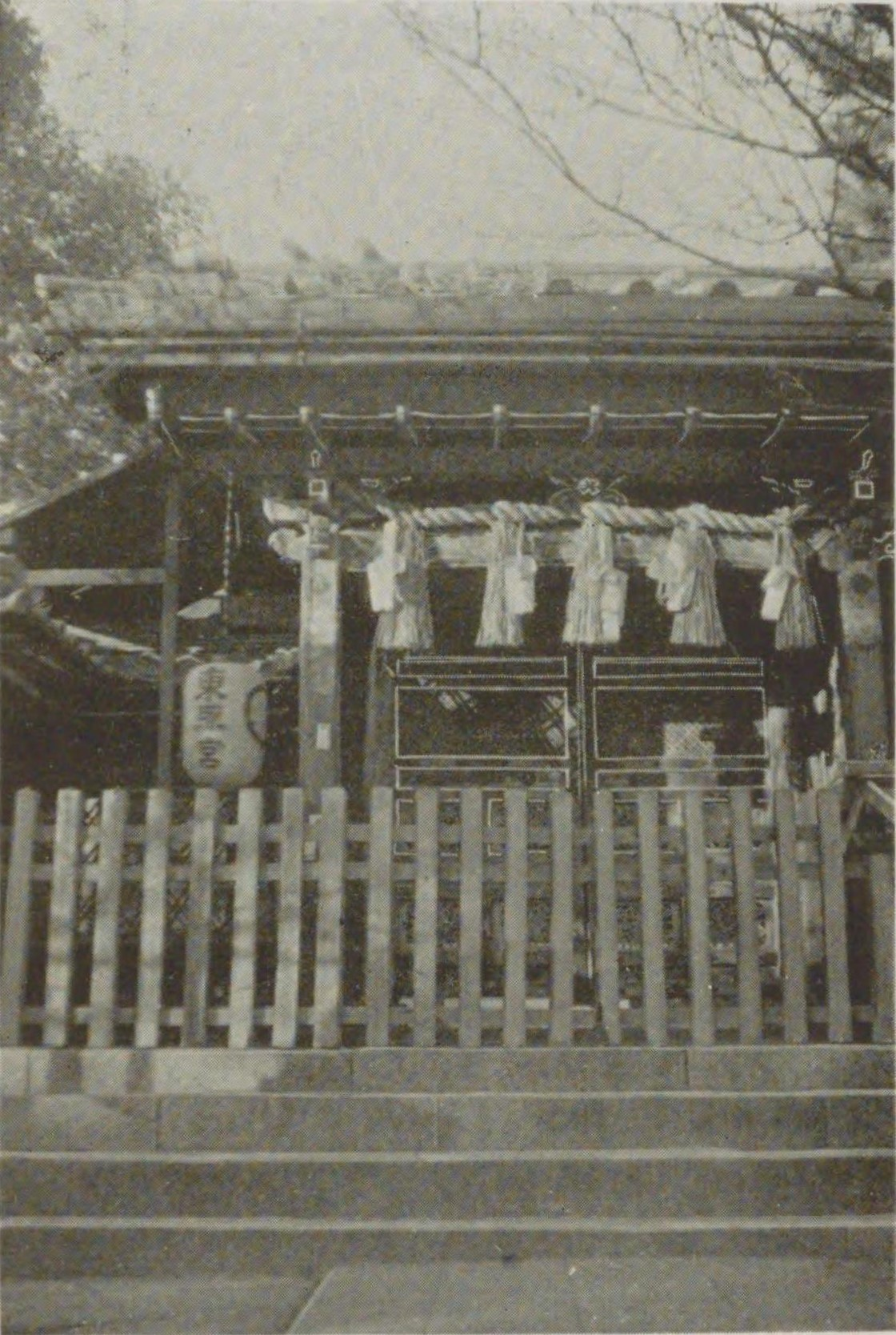
Karamon (pre-WW-II)

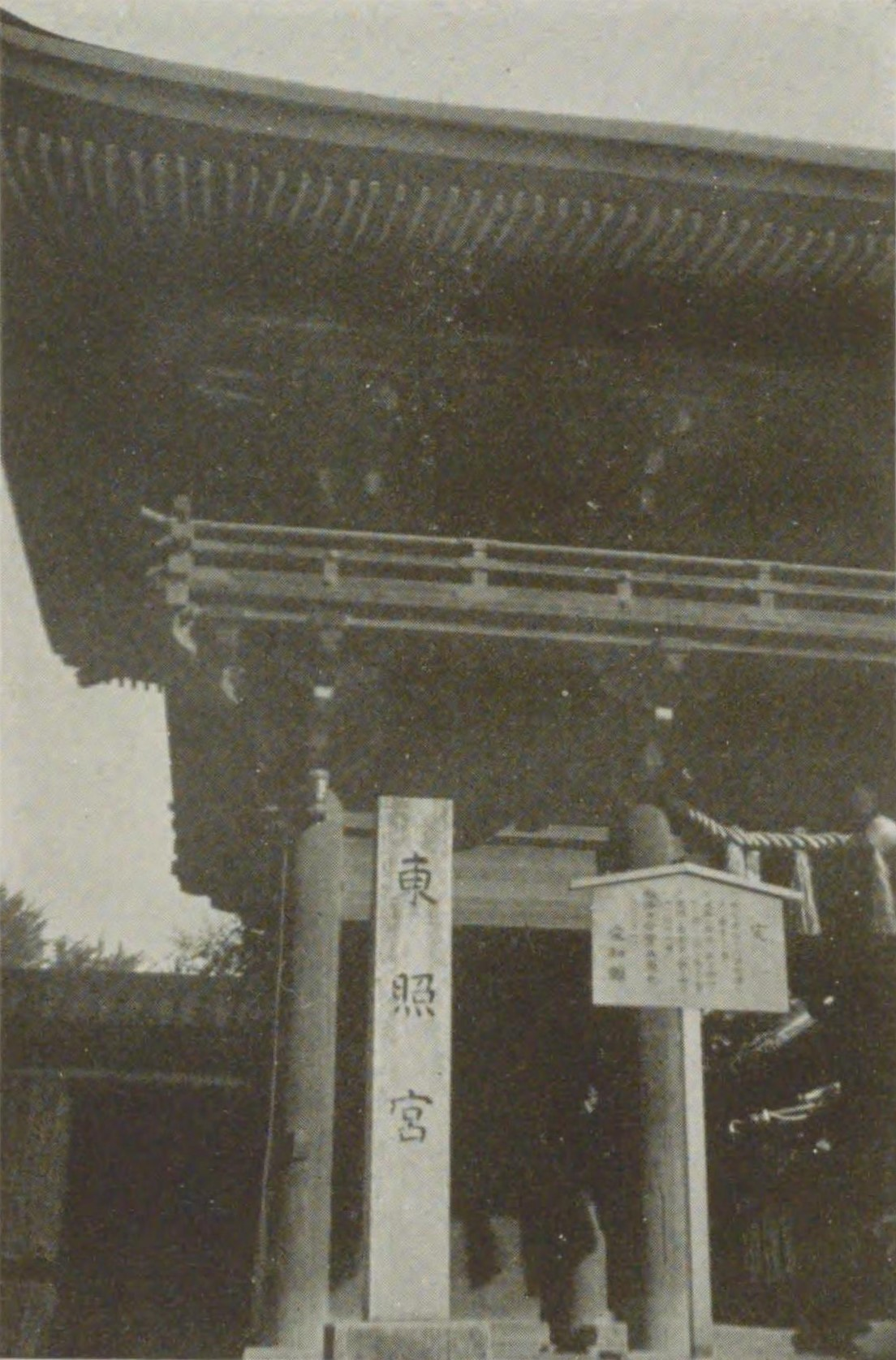
Rōmon (pre-WW-II)

Following the Meiji restoration, State Shinto system of shrine ranking, it was officially designated as a "village shrine", with the designation elevated to that of a "prefectural shrine" in 1875. However, later that same year the Nagoya Garrison was established within the castle grounds, and the shrine was relocated to the site of the former han school, "Meirindo". On May 13, 1935, the main hall and other major buildings were designated as National Treasures under the former Ancient Temples and Shrines Preservation Law. However, they were all destroyed in the Great Nagoya Air Raid on May 14, 1945, at the end of World War II. In October 1953, the mausoleum for Tokugawa Yoshinao's principal wife Haruhime (春姫), which used to be located at Kenchū-ji was located to became the new main hall.

A model of the old shrine's main hall is kept at the Engineering Faculty of Tokyo University. This model was created for the Nagoya Pan-Pacific Peace Exposition in 1937. It is a valuable reference as no dimensional drawings or repair work reports for the shrine has been preserved, although there are some small differences when compared to photographs taken of the building before the war.

== Cultural properties ==
=== Aichi Prefectural Tangible Cultural Properties ===
- Tōshō-gū Shaden (東照宮社殿); Edo period (1651). This designation includes the Honden, Karamon and Lattice fence.
