= Geisha in Rivalry =

1918 novel by Nagai Kafu

- Author: Nagai Kafu
- Original title: 腕くらべ
- Set in: Japan, early 20th century
- Published: 1916-17 (serialised in Bunmei magazine); 1918 (partly censored public edition); 1956 (restored full version in Complete Works)
- English publication date: 1963 (Meissner & Friedrich translation from 1918 version); 2007 (Snyder translation from 1956 version)

Geisha in Rivalry (腕くらべ, Ude kurabe; 1916–1917), also translated under the title of Rivalry: A Geisha's Tale, is a Japanese novel written by Nagai Kafu about the Tokyo hanamachi (geisha district) of Shimbashi in the early 20th century. First published in the Japanese language in 1918, the book was first translated into English in 1963.

Rivalry captures the lives of Shimbashi geisha at a historically popular time for the geisha movement. The author, Nagai Kafu, worked as an editor of literary magazines before deciding to write novels and investigate Tokyo's geisha world.

== Plot summary ==
Rivalry begins with the return of the story's protagonist, Komayo, to the geisha world. Having left the pleasure quarters to live in the countryside, she returns several years later because her husband has died, leaving her to fend for herself. She decides that she would rather relive her days as a geisha than to live as a peasant.

Upon her return, she is reunited with a lover from her past, Yoshioka. The two had spent time together before Yoshioka left the country to study abroad. Yoshioka feels a rekindled desire for Komayo and calls for her often to spend much of her time with him attending events. Soon he suggests that he should become her danna. Although Komayo would be glad to have the financial support, she shies away from his proposal. Komayo and Yoshioka go on a weeklong vacation to hot spring resorts, but Yoshioka has to unexpectedly leave early. Komayo stays and runs into Segawa, a man whom she desires instantly. After a brief, unforgettable affair, Komayo returns to Tokyo.

At the kabuki theater, Yoshioka overhears a conversation about the love affair between Komayo and Segawa. He seeks revenge by becoming involved with Kikuchiyo, a promiscuous geisha from Komayo's okiya. Komayo discovers that Yoshioka has betrayed her; though hurt, she pursues her relationship with Segawa with renewed determination, though Segawa does not reciprocate the same devotion. After a performance, Yoshioka's first mistress, Rikiji, seeks her revenge on Komayo by introducing Segawa to a wealthy former geisha, Kimiryu. This new geisha's financial situation pleases Segawa's mother, who never approved of Komayo.

The novel concludes with Komayo alone. The man who offered to support her and the man she loved left her for other geisha. The mother of her okiya dies, and her husband, Old Gozan, recognizes his inability to continue the house on his own; he passes it on to Komayo. She realizes that the okiya means a lot to her. Gozan's offer adds a glimmer of hope for Komayo with the possibility of running the household herself.

== Themes ==
Rivalry tells the tale of a geisha handling both love and companionship in her life and profession. Throughout the novel, the theme that a geisha should not fall in love – as she will be taken advantage of for her loyalty – becomes evident; at the time of Kafu's writing, geisha were well-known as emblems of loyal female companionship and love, and featured in many popular stories as loyal partners whose affections ran true.

Kafu stresses that men are unreliable and that their intentions are never as they seem. It is hard for a geisha who is so dependent on men to not eventually fall in love, but it is this detachment in itself that will ultimately lead to her independence. She must use her power over men to get what she wants and keep her emotions in check. Rivalry shows a woman's struggle to balance the geisha life with her desire for independence.

== Main characters ==
- Komayo – the protagonist, who has been a geisha since she was 17 or 18, and was named Komazo before debut
- Yoshioka – the methodical and calculating businessman who first met Komayo seven years ago when her name was Komazo
- Rikiji – Yoshioka's first mistress; though not pretty, she is skilled
- Kitani Chojiro – also known as Old Gozan; a storyteller married to Jukichi, who has one surviving, ruined son and a son who died young
- Jukichi – the plump and dependable woman who oversees the Obanaya, married to Old Gozan
- Segawa Isshi – an onnagata (female impersonator in kabuki) who becomes Komayo's lover
- Kikuchiyo – Komayo's sister in the okiya, nicknamed "Chinese goldfish". She is described as gaudy and kitten-like. Yoshioka takes interest in her after Komayo's affair with Segawa
- Hanasuke – Komayo's sister in the okiya and a friend to Komayo, as they have both been through hard times together. Hanasuke is sturdy and hardworking, not particularly pretty, and holds her money close
- Sea Monster – an antique dealer who becomes the danna of Komayo; he knows she will put up with him because she needs his money
- Kimiryu – a former geisha in Rikiji, whose patron died, leaving her his wealth. Kimiryu becomes Segawa Isshi's lover, and is approved of by Segawa's mother

=== Secondary characters ===
- Eda – Yoshioka's good friend
- Kurayama Nanso – a rather nostalgic and old-fashioned novelist and play critic, who becomes caretaker for the Segawa estate. Nanso has a particular fondness for the pine on the Segawa property
- Ochiyo – Nanso's wife, who puts on the dance performances in the fall and spring
- Yamai Kaname – a rather modern literary artist contributing to young people's magazines, known for his cheating
- Takijiro – the son of Jukichi and Gozan. Takijiro was a law student but was expelled for misconduct; he later starts up a brothel
- Ranka – a new geisha serving Segawa and Yamai, whose name means 'orchid'

== Bibliographical information ==
- Nagai Kafu, Rivalry. A Geisha's Tale. Translated by Stephen Snyder. New York : Columbia University Press, 2007.
- Nagai Kafu, Geisha in Rivalry. Translated by Kurt Meissner with the collaboration of Ralph Friedrich. Illus. by Shin Misho. Rutland, Vt., C. E.Tuttle Co. [1963]
- Winterton, Bradley. "'Rivalry' of the Steamy and Sensitive Variety." Taipei Times 2 Mar. 2008: 18. 21 May 2008 <http://www.taipeitimes.com/News/feat/archives/2008/03/02/2003403734>.
