= Attack No. 1 =

Japanese manga series

- Cover of the first manga volume (Kindle edition)

アタックNo.1 (Atakku No. 1)
- Genre: Sports, Drama
- Manga
- Written by: Chikako Urano
- Published by: Shueisha
- Magazine: Margaret
- Original run: January 7, 1968 – November 29, 1970
- Volumes: 12
- Anime television series
- Directed by: Eiji Okabe; Fumio Kurokawa; Yoshio Takeuchi
- Written by: Haruya Yamazaki; Masaki Tsuji; Mon Shichijō; Tetsu Dezaki; Tatsuo Tamura; Tsunehisa Ito
- Music by: Takeo Watanabe
- Studio: Tokyo Movie
- Original network: FNS (Fuji TV)
- Original run: December 7, 1969 – November 28, 1971
- Episodes: 104
- Manga

Shin Attack No. 1
- Written by: Chikako Urano
- Published by: Shueisha
- Magazine: Margaret
- Original run: September 14, 1975 – December 14, 1975
- Volumes: 2
- Manga

Shin Attack No. 1
- Written by: Kanon Ozawa
- Published by: Shueisha
- Magazine: Margaret
- Original run: March 25, 2005 – present
- Volumes: 3
- Television drama
- Original network: TV Asahi
- Original run: April 4, 2005 – June 23, 2005
- Episodes: 11

Attack No. 1 (アタックNo.1, Atakku Nanbā Wan) is a Japanese manga series by Chikako Urano. It became the first televised female sports anime series in the shōjo category.

The anime is an adaptation of Urano's 1968 volleyball manga serialized in Weekly Margaret Magazine under the same name. Urano was considered one of the founders of shōjo anime and the series was introduced not only to push the older female manga fan base (as opposed to the significantly younger audience for magical girl series such as Sally the Witch) into the anime mainstream, but also to capitalize on the boom of the gold medal Japanese women's volleyball team in the 1964 Olympics. The show did stand out in an era dominated by shōnen adventures and sci-fi anime, and was well received in the anime-friendly television markets of France (as Les Attaquantes), Italy (where it was originally retitled Quella magnifica dozzina and later Mimì e la nazionale di pallavolo, where Kozue was renamed Mimì), and Germany (where it was retitled as Mila Superstar, where Kozue was renamed Mila). The name Mila came from the immensely popular Italian version of 1984's Attacker You!, in which the main character, You Hazuki, was renamed Mila, The series debuted on subtitle on ITV in the United Kingdom.

A direct sequel was also released in manga format called Shin Attack No.1 (New Attack No.1) in 1975, but it was short-lived. The sequel was later redrawn between 2004 and 2005 in a new style by Kanon Ozawa.

== Original Story ==
The story is about a twelve-year-old middle school (junior high) girl, Kozue Ayuhara, who transferred to Fujimi Academy and tried out for the school volleyball team. She develops a friendship with her teammate Midori Hayakawa, and her talents impress coach Shunsuke Hongō more and more each day. Though she showcases extraordinary volleyball skills, she makes enemies with Yumi Katsuragi, the star of the current team. Kozue discovers that being at the top would bring stress, incompatibilities and other dilemmas into her life. Her high expectations of becoming the best volleyball player in the school, Japan and eventually the world, set the tone for the drama to follow.

== Characters ==
=== Main characters ===
- Kozue Ayuhara (鮎原 こずえ) Voiced by: Kurumi Kobato Played by: Aya Ueto

Ayuhara is a second year who moved away from Tokyo to a rural junior high school to rehabilitate an illness (which makes her quit sports). After a run-in with other students in the school, she returns to sports (Volleyball), and quickly becomes the leader of the team. Kozue initially begins associating with a group of "delinquents" in the school. The volleyball team members dislike this, and Kozue makes her own team and challenges the real volleyball team to a game. By a slim margin, Kozue's team wins, allowing some of the "delinquent" girls to integrate into the volleyball club, expanding it. From then on, Kozue becomes the captain of Fujimi Middle School's volleyball team.

- Midori Hayakawa (早川 みどり) Voiced by: Sumie Sakai, Eiko Masuyama (fourth movie only) Played by: Ayana Sakai

Hayakawa was born into a wealthy family. She joins the volleyball team and begins playing selfishly in the team, demanding that she deserves to be captain due to her great skills. After some strong persuasion and fighting with Kozue, she becomes #2 on the team, and a friend to Kozue.

- Tsutomu Ichinose (一ノ瀬 努) (Voiced by: Katsuji Mori)

Vice-president of the student council of Fujimi High School who also is in the newspaper club. He is Kozue's cousin and encourages her throughout the series.

=== Secondary characters ===
==== Fujimi ====
- Coach Shunsuke Hongō (本郷 俊介) (Voiced by: Shūsei Nakamura)

A teacher at Fujimi Middle School who offers to be the volleyball coach. He uses "Spartan-like" training methods for Kozue and seems like a callous man, but actually deeply cares for his students.

- Yumi Katsuragi

The initial captain of Fujimi Middle School when Kozue first joins.

- Keiko "Kakko" Kashiwagi (柏木敬子) (Voiced by: Reiko Mutō)

Initially one of the "delinquents" Kozue hangs out with during the middle school, she joins the volleyball club.

- Miyuki Ōnuma (大沼 みゆき) (Voiced by: Yōko Kuri)

Oonuma is the captain of the volleyball club at Fujimi High School. When Kozue and Midori first try to join their club, Oonuma and two other girls rule the club with their demands. Kozue and Midori go through many trials in the high school volleyball club before they break Oonuma's selfish exterior, and they begin to work together in the club.

- Kyouko Makimura (Voiced by: Eiko Masuyama)

Kyouko transfers into Fujimi High School and into Kozue's class. She is a former tennis player, forced to quit sports because of her mother's intense wishes for her to focus on getting into an advanced university. She originally joins the volleyball team in spite of Kozue, but gains respect for Kozue when she realizes that she is seriously training her because Kozue realized her athletic ability from tennis. She eventually becomes a regular on the team once Oonuma retires to focus on college entrance exams.

- Matsue "Ishimatsu" Ishida (Voiced by: Mie Azuma)

Another member of Fujimi High School's volleyball club. Ishimatsu is a regular on the high school team.

- "Naka" Nakazawa (中沢｢ナカ｣) (Voiced by: Kazuko Sawada)

Another girl from the "deliquents" group from the middle school. At the beginning she was a bit of a brawler and did not like Kozue very much, but after getting to know her better she becomes attached to her and she always call her "Captain". She follows Kozue and Midori in High School.

==== Rivals ====
- Michiru Sanjō (三条 美智留) (Voiced by: Reiko Mutō)

One of the Japan Best Twelve, she initially acts quite hostile towards Kozue and the other girls in the Best Twelve. No one is very aware of her, but it is revealed that her team never progressed very far in championships, because, according to Sanjou, she was the only good player on her team. It is revealed that she hates Kozue because of her love for volleyball; Michiru's beloved brother (who was also her only family) was in the volleyball club in college but went missing as a result of an apparent accident in the volleyball club. She stabs the volleyball he gave her in a fit of hysteria, but she keeps the deflated ball with her as a memento of him. Although she hates volleyball as a result of the trauma of losing her only family, she uses the sport as a way to "get revenge" for losing her brother.

- Yoshiko Kakinouchi (Voiced by: Masako Ebisu)

One of Kozue's rivals, she is also on the Japan's Best Twelve.

- Shellenina (シェレーニナ) (Voiced by: Hiroko Suzuki, Eiko Masuyama)

Shellenina is from the Soviet Union and is Kozue's rival. They first meet in their first match together after Fujimi wins the All-Japan championship. Kozue's team ends up losing, due to stress and anxiety from Kozue. Shellenina demands they fight again when Kozue is at her best.

- Kaori Yagisawa (Voiced by: Keiko Yamamoto)

One of the Yagisawa sisters from Jidoin High School. The Yagisawa sisters use the incredible three-person attack, which proves difficult for Fujimi to overcome.

- Katsura Yagisawa (Voiced by: Michiko Nomura)

One of the Yagisawa sisters.
Shizuka Yagisawa (Voice by: Minori Matsushima)
One of the Yagisawa sisters

- Yumiko Mihara

Captain of Misawa High School, she is known for have a strong bullet-like spike from practicing with an automatic ball-launching machine.

- Cathy (Voiced by: Noriko Ohara)

Kozue and Midori first meet Cathy in the Junior Volleyball World Championship. She is on the American team.

- Virginia (Voiced by: Minori Matsushima)

An African-American player on the American team.

- Kana Isahara

From Okinawa, she uses the triangle spike inspired by karate. While the attack appears strong, in the inter-high her team does not advance far because they solely rely on her spike.

=== Other characters ===
- Coach Inokuma Daigo (猪野熊 大吾) (Voiced by: Masao Nakasone, Masahiko Murase)

Inokuma was a friend of Hongo's during university. Hongo was on the baseball team and Inokuma the volleyball team. After the death of his father, he goes crazy and dedicates himself entirely to volleyball. He trains too hard, however, and injures his right wrist beyond repair, rendering him unable to play volleyball ever again. He is seen again in the current timeline of the series during the second National Japan Junior Volleyball competition. Hongo does not initially recognize him, but on the train ride back from Tokyo, he recognizes Inokuma. While they catch up, it is learned that Inokuma led the girls South Korean volleyball team to being second in the world. Then, he coaches Kozue and Midori when they are selected in the best twelve to represent Japan's junior volleyball team. He appears even more demonic and harsh than Hongo initially did.

- Captain Satomi Yoshimura (吉村 さとみ), Kyoko Makimura (真木村 京子) (Voiced by: Eiko Masuyama)
- Tomoyo Arai

A member of the Japan Best Twelve. Her main skill is blocking.

- Junko Mishima

A member of the Japan Best Twelve. Her main skill is creating curve balls.

- Ritsuko Kitami

A member of the Japan Best Twelve.

- Tomoe Miyatsu

A member of the Japan Best Twelve.

- Sachiko Noda

A member of the Japan Best Twelve.

- Hitomi Ohtsuki

A member of the Japan Best Twelve.

- Teruko Shirakawa

A member of the Japan Best Twelve.

- Satomi Yoshimura

A member of the Japan Best Twelve. Her main skill is receiving curve balls.

- Mitamura (Voiced by: Makio Inoue)

Captain of the soccer team, he and Kozue originally meet over school discussions about budget on sports teams at Fujimi Middle School. He appears to have some relationship with Midori throughout the series.

- Jiro Yushima (Voiced by: Katsuji Mori)

An undergraduate student and volleyball player who befriends Kozue because she remembers him his late younger sister, and supports her in times of distress.

- Ryouko Higaki (Voiced by: Masako Nozawa)
- Haruko Shimizu (Voiced by: Hiroko Mori)
- All Japan team captain Matsuyama (Voiced by: Kazue Takahashi)
- Father of Kozue (Voiced by: Osamu Kobayashi)
- Mother of Kozue (Voiced by: Toshiko Asai, Haruko Kitahama)
- Announcer (Voiced by: Daisaku Shinohara)
- Narrator: Katsuji Mori
- Other voices: Mitsuko Asō, Nana Yamaguchi, Sachiko Chijimatsu, Makoto Kōsaka, Kazuo Harada, Michiko Nomura, Makio Inoue, Noriko Ohara, Tōru Furuya, Minori Matsushima, Kei Tomiyama, Mari Shimizu, Jōji Yanami, Masako Sugaya, Chieko Kitagawa, Kōji Yada, Kuriko Komamura, Kaneta Kimotsuki, Kunihiko Kitagawata, Shingo Kanemoto, Yōko Hatayama

== Adaptations ==
=== Anime ===
==== Staff ====
- Additional Director: Fumio Kurokawa, Eiji Okabe, Yoshio Takeuchi, Toshitsugu Mukōtsubo, Kenji Kamiyama
- Screenwriters: Tatsuo Tamura, Masaki Tsuji, Tetsu Dezaki, Haruya Yamazaki, Tsunehisa Ito
- Design: Jun Ikeda
- Animation Director:Tomekichi Takeuchi, Osamu Kobayashi, Ei'ichi Nakamura, Shigetsugu Yoshida, Tetsuhiro Wakabayashi, Hiroshi Iino
  - Animator: Keiichiro Kimura, Yoshiyuki Hane, Takeshi Shirato, Shingo Araki, Saburō Sakamoto, Shigetaka Kiyoyama, Kōichi Murata, Yoshiyuki Momose, etc.

==== DVD ====
The anime was digitally remastered on DVD in 2003 from Amuse Video Inc. Low-priced edition released in 2007 from Columbia Music Entertainment.

=== Movies ===
From 1970 to 1971, a total of four anime movies were spawned based on the series by Toho Co., Ltd and director Eiji Okabe.

Japanese Name	English Name	Release Date	Run time
アタック No.1 富士見学園の新星	Attack No. 1: The Movie	March 21, 1970	63 mins
アタック No.1涙の回転レシーブ	Attack No. 1: Revolution	August 1, 1970	60 mins
アタック No.1涙の世界選手権	Attack No. 1: World Championship	December 19, 1970	63 mins
アタック No.1涙の不死鳥	Attack No. 1: Immortal Bird	March 17, 1971	50 mins

=== Manga ===
The original manga is re-printed by Shueisha in 2003.

No.	Release date	ISBN
1	January 2003	4-8342-7254-0
2	January 2003	4-8342-7255-9
3	February 2003	4-8342-7256-7
4	February 2003	4-8342-7257-5
5	March 2003	4-8342-7258-3
6	March 2003	4-8342-7259-1
7	March 2003	4-8342-7260-5

The redraw by Ozawa for Shin Attack No.1 spans the following 3 volumes:

No.	Release date	ISBN
1	March 2005	978-4-08-847834-0
2	June 2005	978-4-08-847863-0
3	November 2005	978-4-08-846004-8

=== Live action drama ===
In 2005, a live action drama based on Attack No. 1 aired on TV Asahi. Ueto Aya, the famous Japanese actress and singer stars as Kozue Ayuhara.

==== Story ====
The story is very similar to the original, but it has a few differences.

At the beginning of the manga series, Midori Hayakawa did not like Kozue that much because Kozue was really good at volleyball (but they soon became best friends), but in the 2005 drama, Midori has bigger issues with Kozue. First of all, Midori was better at volleyball than Kozue at the start of this drama, and was very jealous when Kozue got called to come and play for Japan's national team (although at this point they did not play any matches, but trained to become stronger). Secondly, Midori has a huge crush on Ichinose Tsutomu-kun. Midori had known Tsutomu-kun since she was very young, and when she found out that he liked Kozue, she was extremely jealous of Kozue. But when Tsutomu-kun died while saving a young boy, Midori's jealousy sort of evaporated. Thirdly, when Kozue helped some girls who were in her volleyball team, Fujimi, from a drunken man, she became popular, and got the No. 1 tracksuit for Fujimi, Midori was very jealous, so she did not tell Kozue that Kozue had been taken out of Japan's volleyball team because, replacing her, Midori had been called to play for Japan. Despite all this jealousy from Midori, Kozue and she are best friends, and in the end get to play together for Japan, as Kozue is called back.

Another difference is that Kozue injures her leg very badly and has to have surgery, but recovers fully. Also, in this drama, it does not reveal if Japan won worldwide, since it ends where Japan are playing Brazil.

== Spinoffs ==
In 1977, Fumio Kurokawa, Eiji Okabe and writer Haruya Yamazaki helmed Attack on Tomorrow (based on a new story by Hana no Ko Lunlun creator Shiro Jinbo) for the Nippon Animation studio, but it did not come close to matching the success of the original series.

In 1984, Kazuyuki Okaseko directed Attacker You! for the Knack animation studio; while not an official spinoff of Attack No. 1, Attacker You! invited the inevitable comparisons with the earlier series, although the latter was heavier on comedic elements. In addition, the screenwriters for the Italian version created a relationship between that series and Attack No. 1 that was not present in the original Japanese: they rewrote You Hazuki (Mila) as a cousin of Kozue, who was renamed "Mimi Ayuhara" in the Italian dub of Attack No. 1. This Voltron-style reworking of the story of Attacker You! by the Italian dubbing staff carried over into the French and Spanish versions of the anime. To compound the confusion, the heroine of Attack on Tomorrow is named Mimi in both the Japanese and Italian versions (although she is renamed Virginie in the French version).

== Reaction ==
This series was practically responsible for the explosion of the shōjo subgenre from 1960s and on. It was originally screened in evening prime time with a ~20% viewership, and the record with its iconic opening theme, sung by Kumiko Oosugi, had about 700,000 sales. There were countless series that followed the same concept, but shifted the focus to different sports. Ace wo Nerae! for tennis, Yawara! A Fashionable Judo Girl for judo are just some examples of series that appeared in the decades after the fading of this series.

The show has received numerous awards. On September 23, 2005, it was voted "TV Asahi Top Anime" placing 61 out of 100. On October 13, 2006, it was voted "Japanese Favorite TV Anime" placing 9 out of 100 among celebrities.

This show also had a profound impact not only for being a sport spirited (supokon) anime in Japan, but had a strong influence long after the series ended. Italian professional volleyball player Francesca Piccinini is one such example of someone inspired by the series. (In Italy, the anime was shown on TV in the 1980s under the title Mimì e la nazionale di pallavolo. It was also known as Mila Superstar in Germany and other countries, Les Attaquantes in French, La Panda de Julia in Spanish and TAKKITAKKI in Uzbekistan.)

Kazuko Suzuki describes Attack No. 1 as an "innovation on the campus story", where a heroine would go to college and meet her future husband. She describes Kozue as "psychologically independent", as Kozue has realised that she must strive to create her own happiness and continues to strive on after her boyfriend's death.

Radiohead guitarist Jonny Greenwood has a decal of the anime decorating the scratchplate of his most-often seen Telecaster Plus.
