= Chikako Urano =

Japanese manga artist

Chikako Urano (Japanese: 浦野千賀子, born 20 December 1946) is a Japanese manga artist. She is best known for the series Attack No.1 (1968–1970).

== Life ==
Urano was born in Osaka. As a teenager, she started publishing comics in the Kashi-hon market. In 1966, she published her first short story "Shibō zero no hi" in a commercial manga magazine, Bessatsu Margaret. She continued working for this magazine and its sister magazine Margaret. She became famous with sports manga. In the latter, she published her most successful series Attack No. 1 from 1968 until 1970. This volleyball manga was also adapted into an anime TV series and contributed, together with the series Sign ha V by Akira Mochizuki, to a hype around women's volleyball in Japan at the time.

Her manga Kyōfu no Yodogō (1970) was inspired by the Yodogō Hijacking Incident that same year.

Her husband was the manga artist Yuu Koto and her brother-in-law the manga artist Kei Sadayasu.

== Works ==
- Attack No. 1 (アタックNo.1, 1968–1970)
- Yuujou no Kaiten Receive (友情の回転レシーブ, 1968)
- Kyōfu no Yodogō (1970)
- Doctor Junko (ドクタージュン子, 1974–1976)
- Shin Attack No. 1 (新アタックNo.1, 1976–1977)
