= 30,000 Miles Under the Sea =

1970 film

- DVD Cover

Japanese name
- Kanji: 海底3万マイル
- Literal meaning: 30,000 miles under the sea
Transcriptions
- Revised Hepburn: Kaitei San-man Mile
- Directed by: Takeshi Tamiya
- Written by: Katsumi Okamoto
- Story by: Shotaro Ishinomori
- Produced by: Hiroshi Okawa
- Starring: Masako Nozawa; Kurumi Kobato
- Music by: Takeo Watanabe
- Production company: Toei Animation
- Release date: 19 July 1970
- Running time: 60 minutes
- Country: Japan
- Language: Japanese

30,000 Miles Under the Sea (海底3万マイル, Kaitei San-man Mile) is a 1970 Japanese anime fantasy adventure film. It was released on 19 July 1970. The film is loosely based on Jules Verne's `1870 novel Twenty Thousand Leagues Under the Seas.

== Plot ==
Isamu, a young boy whose father is a marine researcher and director of a marine research institute located on a volcanic island, lives with his parents, including his mother, who works as her husband's assistant. One day, Isamu explores the ocean floor with his pet cheetah before heading toward the island's volcano. There, he encounters a mysterious girl dressed in a bright red outfit.

An earthquake suddenly strikes, and a giant robot monster known as the "Flame Dragon" emerges from the volcanic crater. As the creature begins attacking the surrounding area, the girl summons a robot called the "See-Through" to rescue them. Two men emerge from the machine and introduce themselves as "Octopus" and "Tuttle," the girl's bodyguards. The girl reveals her identity as Angel, princess of the undersea kingdom of atlas, a civilization located at the bottom of the ocean. Isamu and his pet are invited to visit Atlas aboard the See-Through.

Meanwhile, the ruler of the Undersea Kingdom becomes concerned after learning about the Flame Dragon. He explains that the Atlasians originally lived on land until "King Magma I" attempted to conquer the surface world by creating the Flame Dragon. However, the weapon went out of control and destroyed their country. As a result, Magma I's followers retreated underground, while the remaining Atlasians established their kingdom beneath the sea. The "Flame Dragon" seen by Isamu is revealed to be a robot constructed by "Magma VII", a descendant of the underground faction.

Determined to stop the threat, Isamu and his companions pursue the Flame Dragon to the Underground Kingdom but are captured and imprisoned. They eventually escape and reach the control center, where "Magma VII" operates the "Flame Dragon". At the same time, the underground kingdom launches an assault on the undersea kingdom using an army of Flame Dragons. While the undersea military struggles to defend their realm, Isamu confronts "Magma VII". He defeats him and activates the control system, causing the "Flame Dragon" army to turn against the Underground Kingdom. The ensuing conflict results in the destruction of the underground kingdom and the "Flame Dragons", restoring peace beneath the sea.

After the battle, Isamu and his pet return to the surface aboard the See-Through. Shortly afterward, volcanoes around the world begin to erupt violently. The surface world remains unaware that these events are linked to the massive underwater war and the destruction of the Underground Kingdom.

== Cast ==
- Masako Nozawa as Isamu
- Kurumi Kobato as Angel
- Akira Hitomi as Tail
- Gorō Naya as King Magma VII
- Katsuo Unno as Octopus
- Yonehiko Kitagawa as Undersea King
- Reiko Seno as Isamu's Mother
- Ichirō Murakoshi as Captain
