= Meisho =

Locations alluded to in Japanese poetry

Meisho (名所, lit. 'famous places') originally referred to sites in Japan famous for their associations with specific poetic or literary references. With the development of woodblock printing and newer styles of tourism during the Edo period, the term came to denote a wider range of places of interest.

== Literary meisho ==
Sumida River: The old story of the Kyoto birds, by Hiroshige

Used in conjunction with utamakura, meisho add layers of allusion to poetry and literary and dramatic works which would not otherwise be present.

Many of the most famous meisho derive from references in the Genji Monogatari, Heike Monogatari, and Ise Monogatari. In addition to being referenced in poetry and literature, meisho very often make appearances in Noh, kabuki, and jōruri theatre, and in ukiyo-e and other visual art forms.

One example is that of the miyakodori, or "birds of the capital", originally referenced in the Ise monogatari. As most meisho derive from Heian era source, this is among the very few which related to the Edo/Tokyo area. The protagonist of the monogatari, having been exiled from Kyoto, finds his way to the Sumidagawa in what is today Tokyo; at a particular point in the river, he spots a particular type of plovers which he has not seen before. Asking the boatman what kind of bird they are, he receives the reply that they are miyakodori, "capital birds", which makes him long for the capital and weep, asking the birds what they know of events in Kyoto.

This episode was later referenced in the Noh play Sumidagawa, in which a woman journeys to the region seeking her kidnapped son. Her boatman does not know the name of the birds, and she reprimands him for not being more cultured and knowing that they are miyakodori. Once the Tokugawa shogunate was established at Edo in 1603, this spot on the river where the birds were said to be found became a very popular site for restaurants and other forms of entertainment. Many people would stop here and ponder the poetic resonances, or just enjoy seeing a famous site, while on their way upriver to the Yoshiwara. The spot also appeared frequently in ukiyo-e representations of famous sites or famous restaurants in the capital.

Another keen example is that of Suma shore, a beach near modern-day Kobe, where one episode of the Tale of Genji took place. The battle of Ichi-no-Tani, related in the Tale of the Heike, also took place there, and thus many of the Noh, jōruri and kabuki plays which involve that battle, such as Atsumori and Ichi-no-tani Futaba Gunki, make reference, either outright or silently implied, to the poetic associations of Genji's episode there.

== Popularization of meisho ==
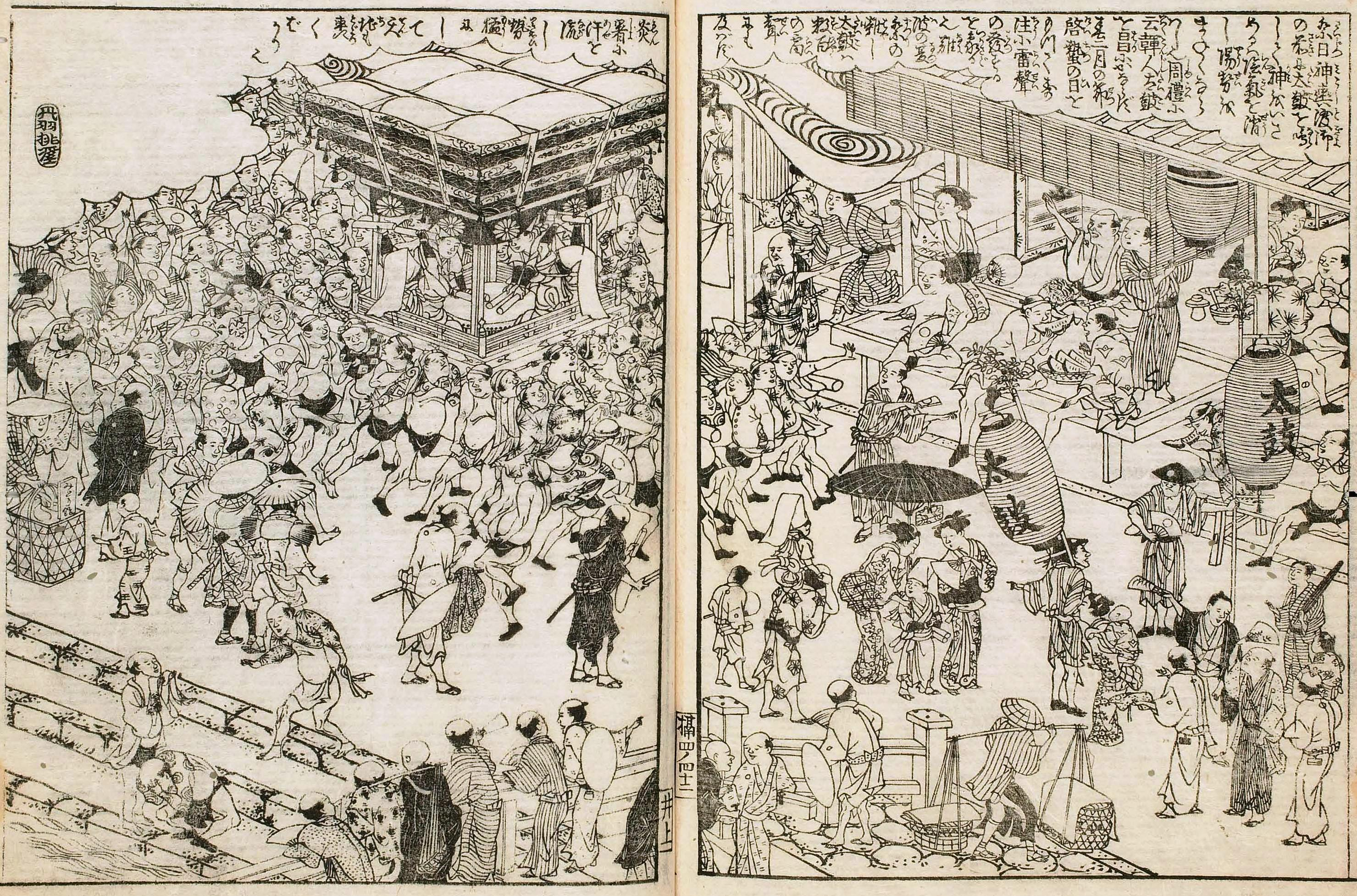
Namba Shrine's Futon Drum, from Settsu meisho-zue, 1796–1798

With the development of woodblock printing in Japan and newer styles of tourism during the Edo period (including literary tourism), the use of the term meisho broadened considerably.

Meisho were featured in various types of books, including travel guides as well as travelogues and regional histories, with names such as Edo meisho zue (Illustrated famous Edo places, 1834) and Owari meisho zue (Illustrated famous Owari places).

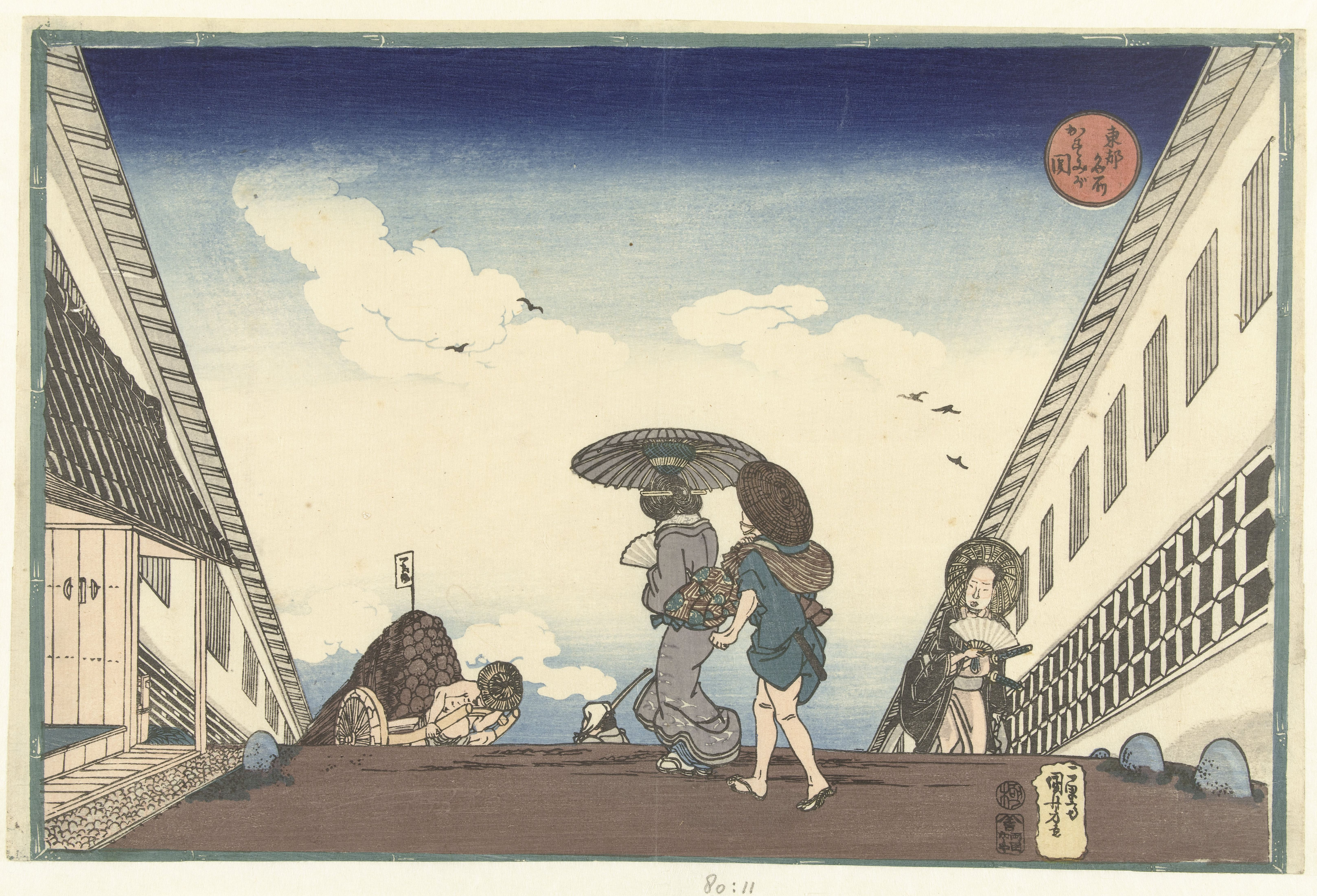
Kasumigaseki in Kuniyoshi's Tōto Meisho

Meisho also provided a popular subject for numerous series of ukiyoe prints such as the famous One Hundred Famous Views of Edo, a late series by Hiroshige completed by Hiroshige II between 1856 and 1859.

== See also ==
- Meibutsu
