= Kafū Nagai =

Japanese writer, editor and translator (1879-1959)

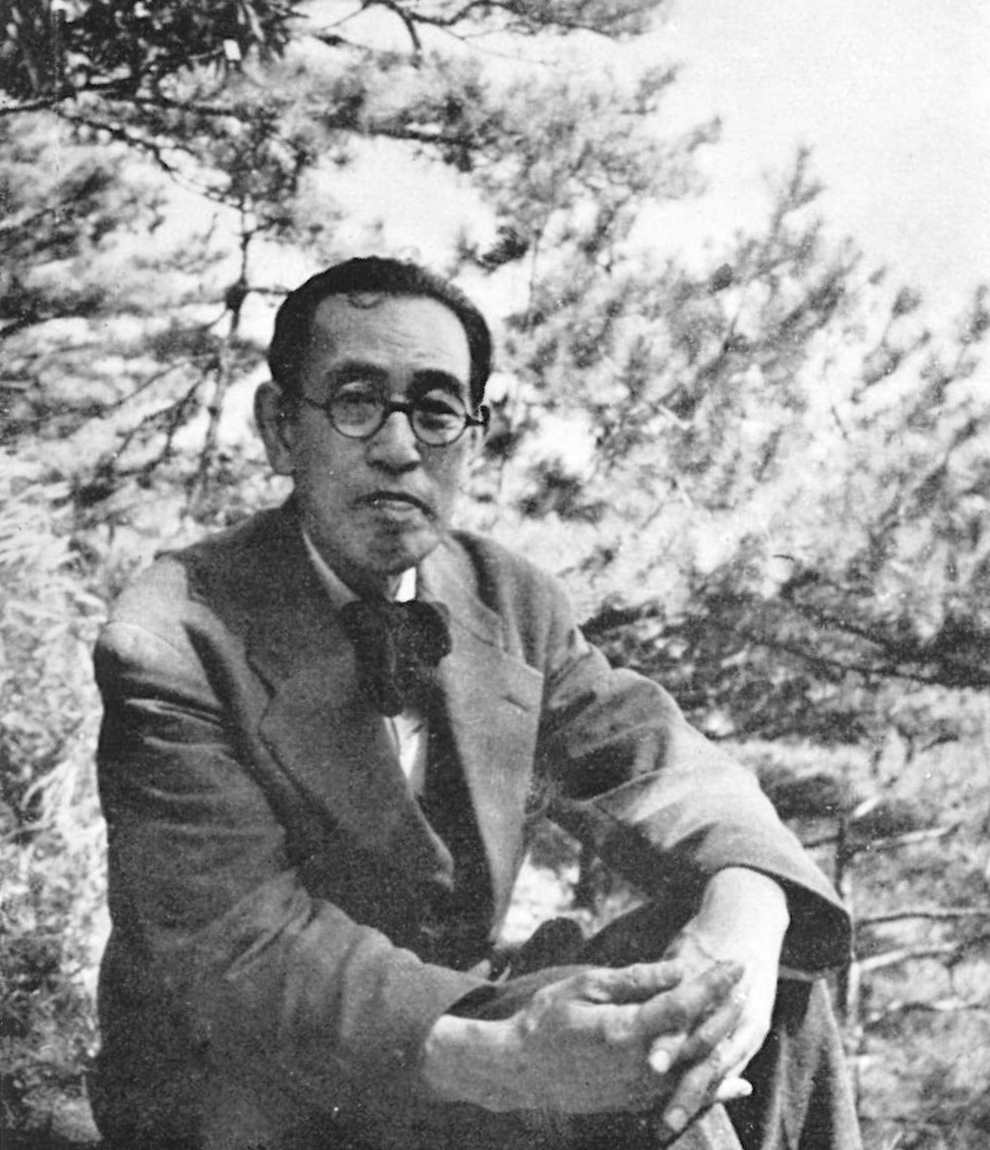
- Kafū in 1947
- Born: Sōkichi Nagai; 3 December 1879; Tokyo, Japan
- Died: 30 April 1959 (aged 79); Ichikawa, Japan
- Education: Junior high school
- Occupations: Writer, translator, editor
- Writing career
- Literary movement: Naturalism, aestheticism

Kafū Nagai (永井 荷風, Nagai Kafū (Note: Japanese pronunciation: [naꜜ.ɡa(.)i | kaꜜ.ɸɯː, naꜜ.ŋa-, na.ɡa(.)i kaꜜ.ɸɯː, na.ŋa-]); 3 December 1879 – 30 April 1959) was a Japanese writer, editor and translator. His novels Geisha in Rivalry and A Strange Tale from East of the River are noted for their depictions of life of the demimonde in early 20th-century Tokyo.

== Biography ==
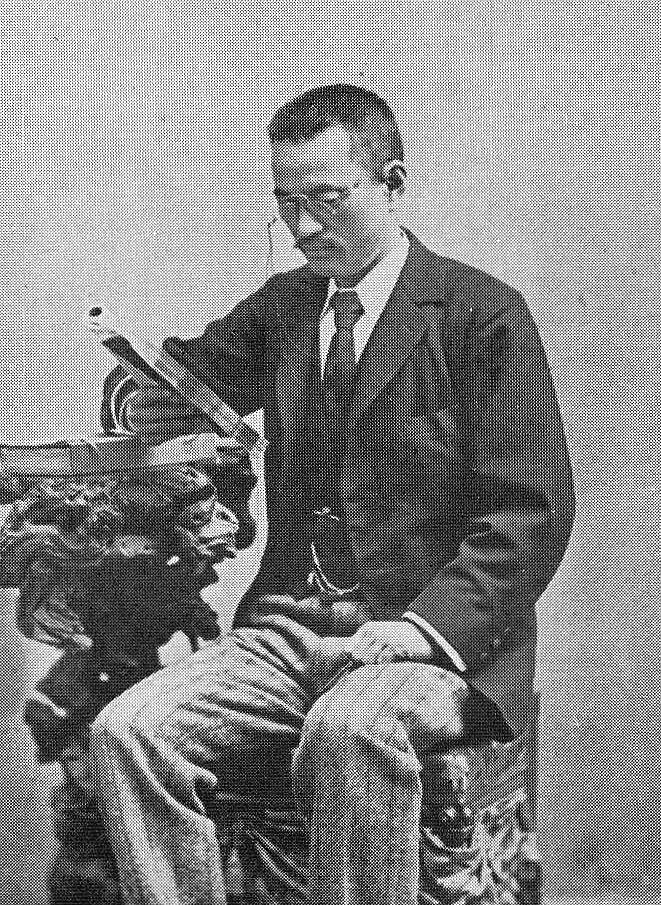
Nagai Kyūichirō, Kafū's father

Kafū was born Sōkichi Nagai (永井 壮吉) in Koishikawa, Bunkyō, Tokyo, as the eldest son of government official Kyūichirō Nagai and his wife Tsune, the daughter of scholar Washizu Kidō. His father was an elite government official in the Home Ministry, who had studied as an exchange student in the United States and also wrote and published Chinese poetry. Kyūichirō later left his Ministry occupation to work for the Nippon Yusen shipping company. When the second son was born in 1883, Kafū was sent to live with his maternal grandmother until 1886. During his childhood, he visited a Chinese language school, and, under his mother's influence, was taught singing and playing music instruments, showing a fondness for utazawa, a late Edo era style of singing accompanied by the shamisen. Starting in 1890, he was also taught English language.

Due to illness, Kafū spent several months in 1895 in a hospital in Odawara. From 1897 on, he started his regular visits to the Yoshiwara red-light district, accompanied by his friend and writer Seiichi Inoue. The same year, he graduated from junior high school. With his mother and younger brothers, he visited Shanghai, where his father was working for Nippon Yusen. He returned to Japan in Autumn and enrolled in the Tokyo School of Foreign Languages.

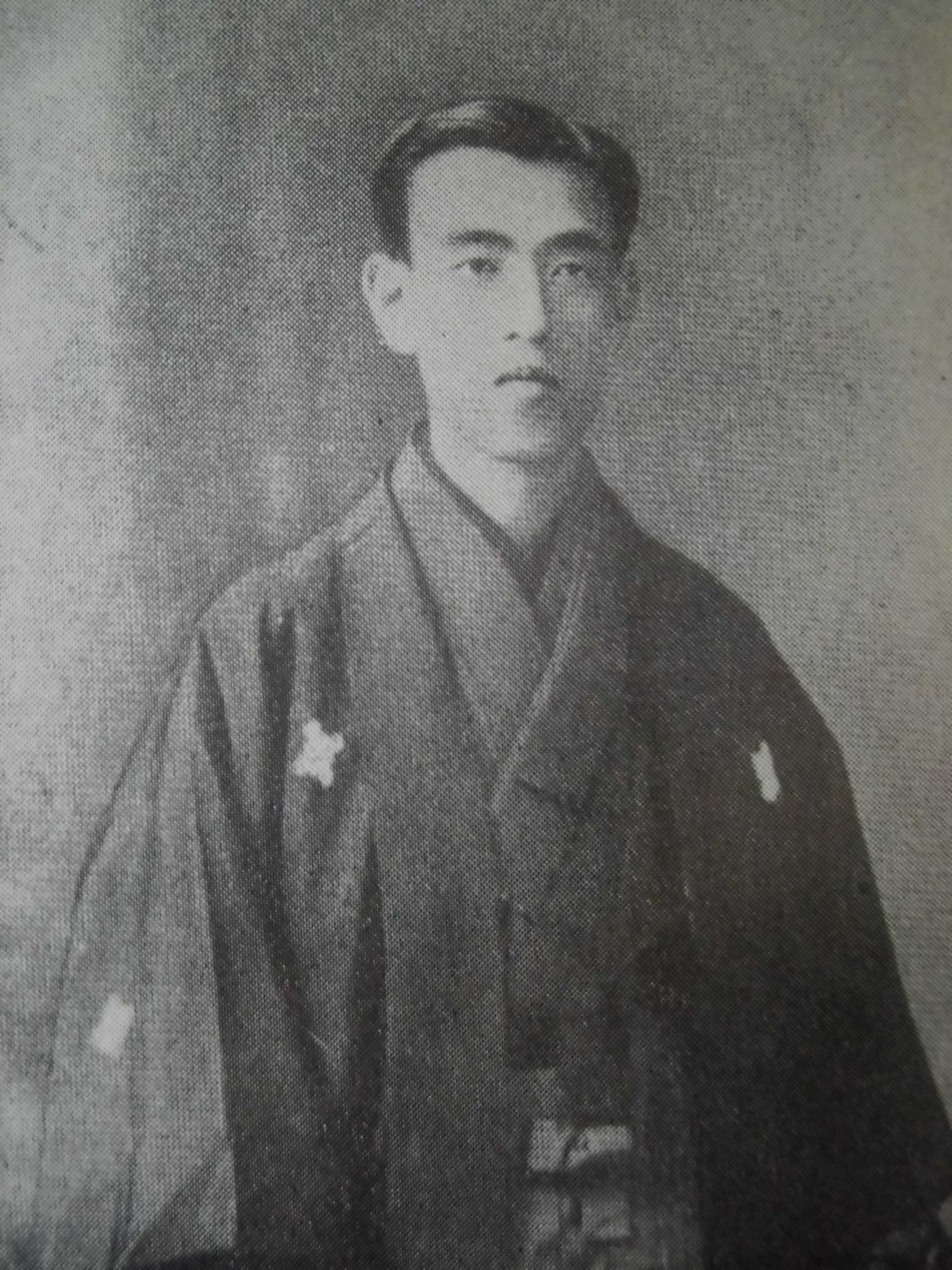
Kafū Nagai in 1912

In 1898, he published his first short story Sudare no tsuki. He became a disciple of novelist Hirotsu Ryūrō and writer Fukuchi Ōchi, studied rakugo and kabuki play writing, appeared on stage in yose plays, and dropped out of University. His writings were influenced by French Naturalism and Émile Zola, whose work he also translated. Between 1903 and 1908, through his father's influence, Kafū visited the United States and later France, a time which he wrote down in his American Stories (Amerika monogatari) and Furansu monogatari (lit. "French Stories"). The 1908 publication of American Stories met with much critical acclaim.

In 1910, Kafū started teaching as a professor of literature at Keio University and became the editor of the literary magazine Mita Bungaku. At this time, he had already turned away from Naturalism and taken a shift towards Aestheticism. The transition from the Meiji era to the Taishō era was also a turning point in Kafū's life: the death of his father, the divorce from both his first and second wife (the second marriage—to a geisha—led to the alienation of his mother), and the resigning from his position at Keio University and Mita Bungaku. A frequenter of Tokyo's demimonde, Kafū wrote many stories about its inhabitants, geisha, courtesans and their customers, most notably Geisha in Rivalry (1916–17).

After a decade-long hiatus, he published the novellas During the Rains (1931), Flowers in the Shade (1934) and A Strange Tale from East of the River (1937), with the latter having repeatedly been cited as his major work. His contempt for the militarist regime, which in turn regarded his work as subversive for the war effort, led to a halt of the publishing of his writings until the end of World War II. The publication of his diaries (1917–1959) ranks as the major literary event of his post-war career.

In 1952, Kafū received the Order of Culture, and in 1954, he was elected a member of the Japan Art Academy. He died on 30 April 1959.

== Selected works ==
- 1908: American Stories (あめりか物語, Amerika monogatari)
- 1911: The River Sumida (すみだ川, Sumidagawa)
- 1916–1917: Geisha in Rivalry (腕くらべ, Ude kurabe)
- 1917–1959: Danchōtei nichijō (断腸亭日乗)
- 1931: During the Rains (つゆのあとさき, Tsuyu no atosaki)
- 1934: Flowers in the Shade (ひかげの花, Hikage no hana)
- 1937: A Strange Tale from East of the River (濹東綺譚, Bokutō kidan)
