= Owari meisho zue =

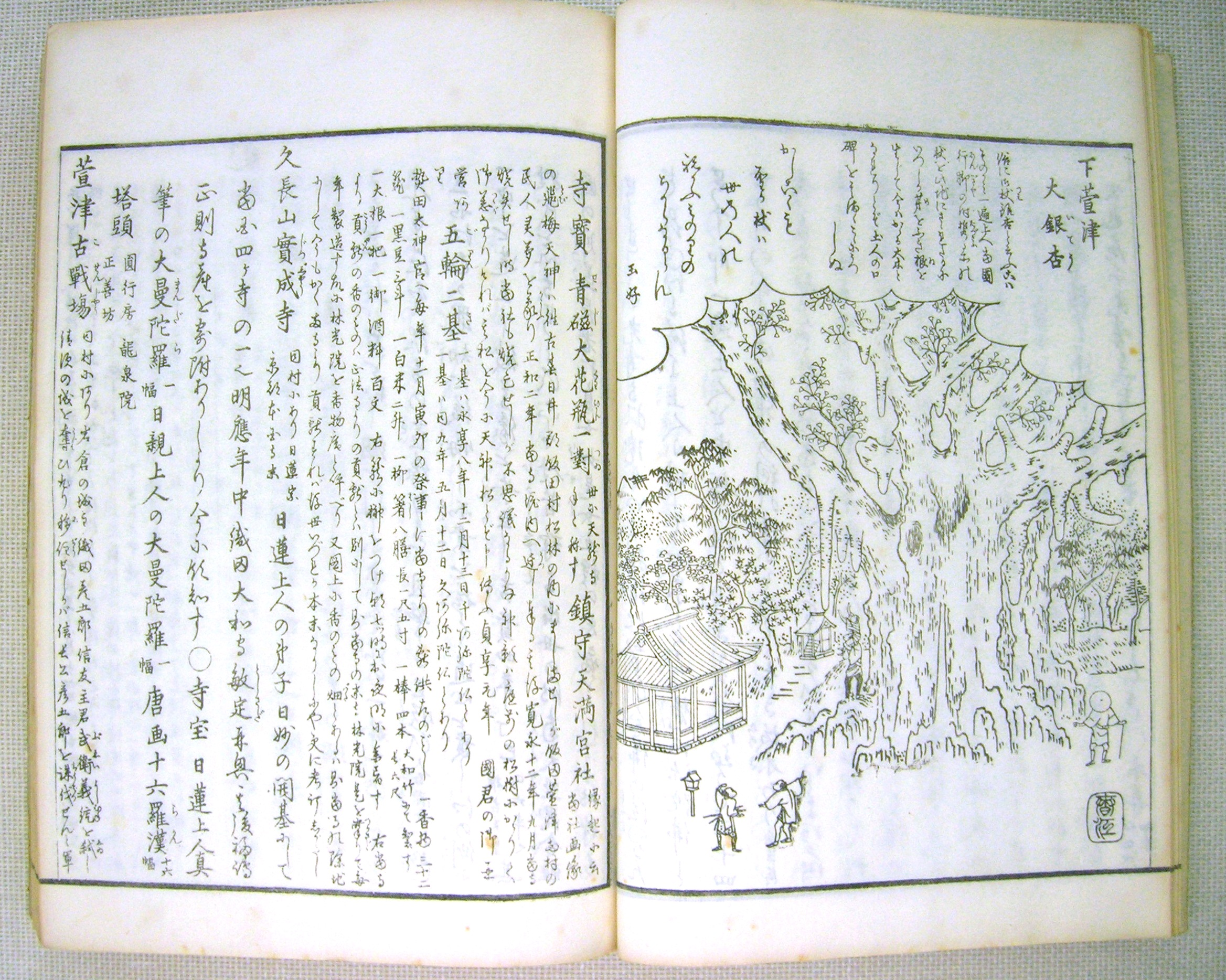
Pages from the Owari meisho Zue

Owari meisho zue (尾張名所図会; "Guide to famous Owari sites") is an illustrated guide describing famous places, called meisho, and depicting their scenery in pre-1868 Owari province in central Japan. It was printed as a multi-volume set using Japanese woodblock printing techniques.

The Owari meisho Zue followed the publication of the Edo meisho zue, which sparked a public interest in travel guides.

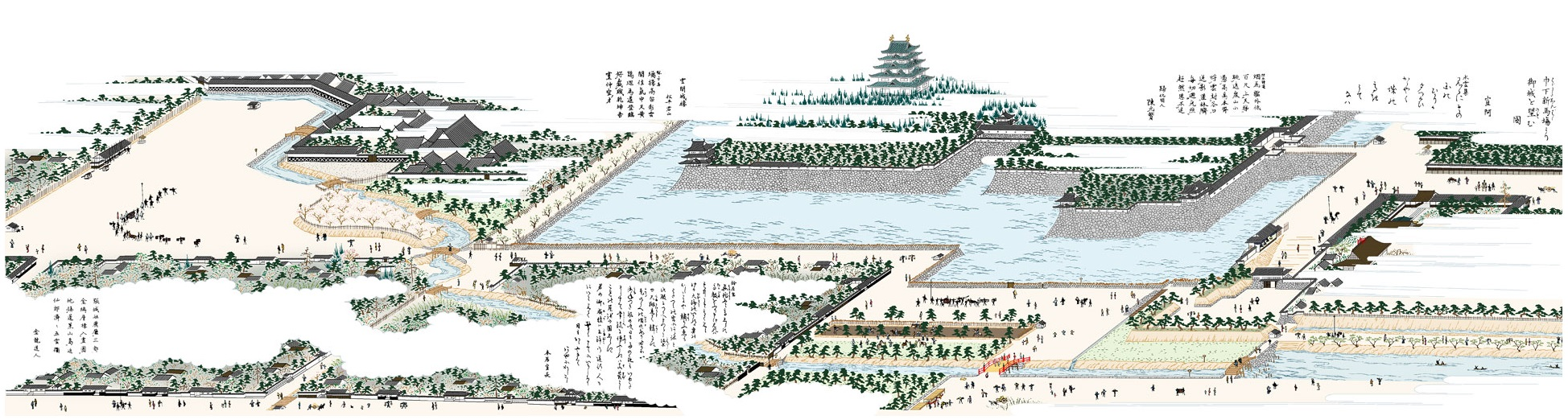
Print from the Owari meisho zue depicting Nagoya Castle in the late Edo period seen from the west. From right: Tōshō-gū, "cormorant's neck" moat, main keep, northwestern turret, and the retreat of Lord Tokugawa Naritomo (徳川 斉朝) in Horibata-chō (堀端町) on the left. The Hori river is running below.
