= Nina (name) =

- Gender: Feminine

Origin
- Origin: Various

Other names
- Alternative spelling: Nína, Niná, Nena
- Related names: Johanna (given name), Joanina (given name)

Nina is a feminine given name with various origins and alternate spellings accordingly. Nina may also serve as a short form of names ending in "-nina/-ina", such as Clementina, Christina, or Giannina. It serves as a diminutive of the variation of the nevertheless original form of the Hebrew name Johannah, or Joanina.

Nína is an Icelandic name, while Niná is a Sami name. Nina is also a name in multiple South American languages; it means "fire" in Quechua and "fire which will never be extinguished" in Aymara. It also has a relation to the Spanish word "niña", which translates as "little girl".

== Given name ==
- Nina Chanel Abney (born 1982), American artist
- Nina Abe (born 2007), Polish footballer
- Nina Abramova (born 1949), Russian rower
- Nina Avgustinovna Adolf (1903–1951), Russian botanist
- Nina Afanasyeva (born 1939), Russian-Sami politician and language activist
- Nina Agadzhanova (1889–1974), Soviet revolutionary, screenwriter and film director
- Nina Agapova (1926–2021), Russian actress
- Nina Agdal (born 1992), Danish model
- Nina Ahlstedt, Finnish painter
- Nina Ahmad, American politician
- Nina Aigner (born 1980), Austrian footballer
- Nina Akamu, Japanese-American artist
- Nina Albert, American urban planner
- Nina Albright (1907–1997), American comic book artist
- Nina Aleshina (1924–2012), Russian architect
- Nina Alisova (1915–1996), Russian actress
- Nina Allan (born 1966), British writer
- Nina E. Allender (1873–1957), American cartoonist and activist
- Nina Alovert (born 1935), Russian photographer
- Nina Amir (born 1999), Israeli sports sailor
- Nina Ananiashvili (born 1963), Georgian ballerina
- Nina Nymark Andersen (born 1972), Norwegian footballer
- Nina Andreyeva (1938–2020), Soviet Communist Party official
- Nina Andrieshen (born 1980), German politician
- Nina Andriievska (1927–2014), Ukrainian composer and musicologist
- Nina Andrycz (1912–2014), Polish actress
- Nina Angelovska (born 1988), Macedonian politician
- Nina Anisimova (disambiguation), multiple people
- Nina Ansaroff (born 1985), American mixed martial artist
- Nina Ansary (born 1966), Iranian-American historian
- Nina Antonia (born 1960), British author
- Nina Appel (born 1936), American lawyer
- Nina Arbore (1888–1942), Romanian painter and illustrator
- Nina Arianda (born 1984), American actress
- Nina Arkhipova (1921–2016), Soviet and Russian actress
- Nina Armagno (born 1966), U. S. Space Force general
- Nina Arsenault (born 1974), Canadian performance artist and freelance writer
- Nina Arvesen (born 1961), American actress
- Nina Frick Asenjo (1884–c. 1963), Chilean pianist and composer
- Nina Assimakopoulos, American recording artist and professor
- Nina Åström (born 1962), Finnish singer
- Nina Auchincloss Straight (born 1937), American author, journalist and socialite
- Nina Auerbach (1943–2017), American professor
- Nina Averina (born 1935), Russian journalist, local historian and poet
- Nina Axelrod (born 1955), American actress
- Nina Baanders-Kessler (1915–2002), Dutch sculptor and medalist
- Nina Babel, German physician and scientist
- Nina Baden-Semper (born 1945), British actress
- Nina Badrić (born 1972), Croatian singer
- Nina Baginskaya (born 1946), Belarusian opposition activist
- Nina Balaban (born 1995), Macedonian sports shooter
- Nina Bandelj, economic sociologist, author and academic
- Nina Bang (1866–1928), Danish politician
- Nina Banks, American economist
- Nina Bari (1901–1961), Russian mathematician
- Nina Barough, British charity founder
- Nina Barr Wheeler (1909–1978), American artist
- Nina Bassuk (born 1952), American academic
- Nina Bates (born 1985), Bosnian figure skater
- Nina Bawden (1925–2012), British author
- Nina Baym (1936–2018), American literary critic
- Nina Beachcroft (born 1931), English writer
- Nina Becker (born 1974), Brazilian singer-songwriter
- Nina Bednarik (born 1982), Slovenian freestyle skier
- Nina Behrendt (born 1983), German politician
- Nina Beilina (1937–2018), Russian violinist and academic
- Nina Belikova (born 1961), Russian long-distance runner
- Nina Belyaeva, Russian public policy researcher and professor
- Nina Ben Ami, Israeli diplomat
- Nina Bendigkeit, German singer
- Nina Benz (born 1998), German cross-country mountain biker
- Nina Berberova (1901–1993), Russian author
- Nina Bergsvik (born 1973), Norwegian sprint canoer
- Nina Berkhout, Canadian poet and novelist
- Nina Berman (born 1960), American photographer
- Nina Bernstein, American journalist
- Nina Berova, professor of chemistry
- Nina Berova-Orahovac (1859–1945), Bessarabian- Bulgarian physician
- Nina Bertini-Humphreys, American actress
- Nina Berton (born 2001), Luxembourgish cyclist
- Nina Betschart (born 1995), Swiss volleyball player
- Nina Bichuya (born 1937), Ukrainian writer
- Nina Bjedov (born 1971), Serbian basketball player
- Nina Bjerkedal (born 1953), Norwegian civil servant
- Nína Björk Árnadóttir (1941–2000), Icelandic playwright, poet and novelist
- Nina Björk (born 1967), Swedish author
- Nina Björnström, Finnish beauty pageant winner
- Nina Blackwood (born 1955), American disc jockey
- Nina Bland (born 1959), Canadian athlete
- Nina Bloomgarden (born 1998), American actress
- Nina Bocharova (1924–2020), Ukrainian gymnast
- Nina Bodnar, American concert violinist
- Nina Bogićević (born 1989), Serbian basketball player
- Nina Bohm (born 1958), Swedish tennis player
- Nina Gomer Du Bois (1870–1950), American civil rights activist
- Nina Yang Bongiovi, American film producer
- Nina Bonner (born 1972), Australian field hockey player
- Nina Bott (born 1978), German actress
- Nina Boucicault (1867–1950), English actress
- Nina Bourne (1916–2010), publishing executive
- Nina Bovasso, American artist
- Nina Floy Bracelin (1890–1973), American botanist
- Nina Bracewell-Smith (born 1955), British aristocrat
- Nina Bradley (disambiguation), multiple people
- Nina Bradlin, American singer and stage actress
- Nina Bratchikova (born 1985), Russian tennis player
- Nina Starr Braunwald (1928–1992), American surgeon
- Nina Breeder (born 1982), Italian film director
- Nina Brodskaya (born 1949), Soviet singer
- Nina Brosh (born 1975), Israeli model
- Nina Brown (1915–2018), British–American tennis player
- Nina Brown Baker (1888–1957), author of biographies
- Nina Browne, American librarian and archivist
- Nina Broznić (born 1991), Croatian cross-country skier
- Nina Brunner (born 1995), Swiss beach volleyball player
- Nina Brusnikova (born 1960), hero of the Russian Federation
- Nina Buchmann (born 1965), German plant ecologist
- Nina Buijsman (born 1997), Dutch cyclist
- Nina Bulatović (born 1996), Montenegrin handballer
- Nina Bunjevac (born 1973), Serbian Canadian cartoonist
- Nina Burger (born 1987), Austrian footballer
- Nina Burleigh (born c. 1959 or 1960), American journalist
- Nina Buysman (born 1997), Dutch cyclist
- Nina Byers (1930–2014), American physicist
- Nina Byron (1900–1987), American silent film actress
- Nina Bystrova (1944–2011), Soviet rower
- Nina Caicedo (born 1986), Colombian actress
- Nina Canell, Swedish visual artist
- Nina Carberry (born 1984), Irish jockey
- Nina Beth Cardin, American writer, activist and rabbi
- Nina Carroll (1932–1990), British painter
- Nina Castagna (born 2000), American rower
- Nina Catach, French linguist and linguistic historian
- Nina Cheremisina (born 1946), Russian rower
- Nina Mikhailovna Chernovna (1935–2010), Russian scientist, soil zoologist and ecologist
- Nina Christen (born 1994), Swiss sports shooter
- Nina Christesen (1911–2001), Russian-born Australian academic in Russian language studies
- Nina Christiansen (born 1964), Danish long-distance runner
- Nina Clarkin, British polo player
- Nina Clifford (1851–1929), Canadian-American madam
- Nina Cohen (1907–1991), Canadian philanthropist
- Nina Coltart (1927–1997), British psychoanalyst
- Nina Companeez (1937–2015), French screenwriter and film director
- Nina Compton (born 1978), St. Lucian chef based in Louisiana
- Nina Conti (born 1973), British actress
- Nina Coolman (born 1991), Belgian volleyball player
- Nina Coote (1883–1945), English-born Irish croquet player
- Nina Corti (born 1953), Swiss flamenco dancer
- Nina Crews (born 1963), American children's writer
- Nina Crone (1934–2007), Australian gardening writer, broadcaster, teacher and school principal
- Nina Crummy, British archaeologist
- Nina J. Cullinan (1899–1983), American art patron and civic leader
- Nina Curtis (born 1988), Australian sailor
- Nina Cutro-Kelly (born 1984), American judoka
- Nina Czegledy, Hungarian-born Canadian artist
- Nina da Hora, Afro-Brazilian activist
- Nina Daniels (born 1982), New Zealand synchronised swimmer
- Nina Dano (born 2000), Swedish handball player
- Nina Davies (disambiguation), multiple people
- Nina Davis (disambiguation), multiple people
- Nina Davuluri (born 1989), American public speaker and Miss America 2014
- Nina de Creeft Ward (born 1933), American artist and educator
- Nina Demme (1902–1977), Soviet biologist and polar researcher
- Nina den Heyer (born 1978), Dutch politician
- Nina Derwael (born 2000), Belgian gymnast
- Nina de Vries (born 1961), Dutch sex worker
- Nina L. Diaz, Viacom executive
- Nina Dittrich (born 1990), Austrian swimmer
- Nina Divíšková (1936–2021), Czech actress
- Nina Dobrushina (born 1968), Russian linguist
- Nina Dorda (1924–2016), Soviet singer
- Nina Dorliak (1908–1998), Russian soprano
- Nina Doroh (fl. 1970s), Belarusian sprint canoer
- Nina Doroshina (1934–2018), Soviet and Russian actress
- Nina Douglas-Hamilton, Duchess of Hamilton (1878–1951), British noblewoman
- Nina Dronkers, American cognitive neuroscientist
- Nina Dübbers (born 1980), German tennis player
- Nina Dudarova (1903–1992), Romani poet and translator
- Nina Dudnik, American founder and former CEO of Seeding Labs
- Nina Dumbadze (1919–1983), Georgian-Ukrainian discus thrower
- Nina Đurđević (born 1991), Slovene model and Miss Universe Slovenia 2013
- Nina Larrey Duryea (1874–1951), American writer
- Nina Dyakonova (1915–2013), Russian researcher and professor
- Nina Dyer (1930–1965), Anglo-Indian model and socialite
- Nina Easton (born 1958), American journalist
- Nina Edge, English ceramicist, feminist and writer
- Nina Ehegötz (born 1997), German footballer
- Nina Ehrnrooth (born 1962), Finnish alpine skier
- Nina Eichinger (born 1981), German television presenter and actress
- Nina Eim (born 1998), German triathlete
- Nina Einhorn (1925–2002), Polish-born Swedish physician and cancer researcher
- Nina Eisenhardt (born 1990), German politician
- Nina Elder (born 1981), American artist
- Nina F. Elgo (born 1962), American judge from Connecticut
- Nina Epton (c. 1913–2010), British radio producer, broadcaster and travel writer
- Nina Etkin (1948–2009), American anthropologist and botanist
- Nina Fagnani, French painter
- Nina Fedoroff (born 1942), American molecular biologist
- Nina Fefferman (born 1978), American revolutionary biologist
- Nina Fellman (born 1964), Ålandic politician
- Nina Felshin (born 1944), American art historian
- Nina Fernandes (born 1999), Brazilian singer-songwriter
- Nína Dögg Filippusdóttir (born 1974), Icelandic actress and producer
- Nina Fiore, American television writer and producer
- Nina Fisheva (1930–2010), Azerbaijani art administrator
- Nina Fishman (1946–2009), American-born English labour movement historian and political activist
- Nina Maria Fite, American diplomat
- Nina Fjalestad (born 1993), Norwegian model, dancer and beauty pageant titleholder
- Nina Foch (1924–2008), Dutch-American actress
- Nina Fout (born 1959), American equestrian
- Nina Mae Fowler, British artist
- Nina Foxx, American dramatist
- Nina Franke, Dutch sprinter
- Nina Franoszek (born 1963), German-American actress
- Nina Frausing-Pedersen (born 1991), Danish women's footballer
- Nina Freeman (born 1990), American video game designer
- Nina Frisak (born 1950), Norwegian judge and civil servant
- Nina Frolova (born 1948), Soviet rowing cox
- Nina Fry, English actress
- Nina Schanke Funnemark, Norwegian civil servant
- Nina Fyodorova (1947–2019), Soviet skier
- Nina Gabrielyan (1953–2026), Russian-Armenian writer and artist
- Nina Gage (1883–1946), American nursing administrator
- Nina Gagen-Torn (1900–1986), Swedish-Russian ethnographer
- Nina Gantert (born 1962), Swiss and German probability theorist
- Nina Gantz (born 1987), Dutch animation film director
- Nina Garbiras (born 1964), American actress
- Nina Garsoïan (1923–2022), American historian
- Nina Gäßler (born 1975), German mountain biker and rower
- Nina Gavrylyuk (born 1965), Russian cross-country skier
- Nina Genke-Meller (1893–1954), Russian artist
- Nina George (born 1973), German writer
- Princess Nina of Greece and Denmark (born 1987), Swiss businesswoman
- Princess Nina Georgievna of Russia (1901–1974), Russian Princess
- Nina Gerber, American guitarist
- Nina Geria (born 1990), Ukrainian strength athlete
- Nina Gerhard (born 1974), German Eurodance singer
- Nina Gershon (born 1940), American judge
- Nina Gnädig (born 1977), German actress
- Nina Godiwalla (born 1975), American author and businesswoman
- Nina Gold, British casting director
- Nina Golovtchenko, Russian curler
- Nina Golubkova (1932–2009), Russian lichenologist
- Nina Gopova (born 1953), Russian canoer
- Nina Gordon (born 1967), American rock singer
- Nina S. Gore (1903–1978), American actress and socialite
- Nina Gorodetzky (born 1981), Israeli para-badminton player
- Nina Gorst (1869–1926), British novelist and playwright
- Nina Gourfinkel, Russian Jewish writer
- Nina Graboi (1918–1999), New Age spiritual leader
- Nina Cameron Graham (1891–1974), first woman to receive an engineering degree in Britain
- Nina Grebeshkova (1930–2025), Russian actress
- Nina Grewal (born 1958), Canadian politician
- Nina Grieg, née Hagerup (1845–1935), Norwegian lyric soprano
- Nina Griscom (1954–2020), American model
- Nina Grishchenkova, Russian rowing coxswain
- Nina Grønnum (born 1945), Danish phonetician
- Nina Tangnæs Grønvold (born 1969), Norwegian politician
- Nina Grosse (born 1958), German film director
- Nina Grunenberg (1936–2017), German author and journalist
- Nina Grünfeld (born 1966), Norwegian film director and author
- Nina Gruzintseva (1934–2021), Russian canoer
- Nina Gualinga, Ecuadorian human rights activist
- Nina Gulino (born 1988), Italian cyclist
- Nina Gunke (born 1955), Swedish actress
- Nina Gunter, church of Nazarene General Superintendent
- Nina Guseva (born 1988), Russian actress and documentary filmmaker
- Nina Güthner, German writer
- Nina Hachigian, American politician and diplomat
- Nina Hallowell (1957–2023), British social scientist
- Nina Hamid, Bangladeshi folk singer
- Nina Hamnett (1890–1956), British artist
- Nina Hansen (born 1942), Danish long jumper
- Nina Harmer (married name Nina Thompson, born 1945), American swimmer
- Nina R. Harper (1950–2018), American politician
- Nina Hartstone, British sound editor
- Nina Hasselmann (born 1986), German field hockey player
- Nina Hasvoll (1910–1999), Russian-Norwegian psychoanalyst
- Nina Haver-Løseth (born 1989), Norwegian alpine skier
- Nina Heglund (born 1993), Norwegian-British handball player
- Nina Helou, Lebanese lawyer and former First Lady of Lebanon
- Nina Hemmer (born 1993), German freestyle wrestler
- Nina Hemmingsson (born 1971), Swedish cartoonist
- Nina Herasymova-Persydska (1927–2020), Ukrainian musicologist
- Nina Herelová (born 1993), Slovak volleyball player
- Nina Hibbin (1922–2004), English film critic and author
- Nina Hietanen (born 1985), Finnish footballer
- Nina Hoekman (1964–2014), Ukrainian-Dutch draughts player and coach
- Nina Kiriki Hoffman (born 1955), American novelist
- Nina Høiberg (born 1956), Danish chess player
- Nina Holden, Norwegian mathematician
- Nina Hole (1941–2016), Danish artist
- Nina Hollein (born 1971), Austrian architect and fashion designer
- Nina Hollensen (born 1992), Danish rower
- Nina Holmén (born 1951), Finnish long-distance athlete
- Nina Hoss (born 1975), German actress
- Nina Hossain (born 1973), British journalist
- Nina Howell Starr (c. 1903–2000), American photographer, art historian and art dealer
- Nina Hrušková-Bělská (1925–2015), Czech chess player
- Nina Hughes (born 1982), English professional boxer
- Nina Humphreys, British composer
- Nina Hunt (1932–1995), Manx choreographer
- Nina Hyams, American linguist
- Nina Hyde (1932–1990), American fashion editor
- Nina Hynes, Irish musician and music producer
- Nina Ignatyeva (born 1948), Russian luger
- Nina Ilyina (born 1951), Ukrainian film actress
- Nina Inhammar (born 1977), Swedish singer
- Nina Wallet Intalou, Malian businesswoman and politician
- Nina Iskrenko (1951–1995), Russian poet
- Nina Ivančić, Croatian artist
- Nina Ivanišin (born 1985), Slovenian actress
- Nina Ivanova (1934–2020), Russian-Soviet actress
- Nina Jablonski (born 1953), American anthropologist and palaeobiologist
- Nina Jacobson (born 1965), American film executive
- Nina Jakobsson (born 1994), Swedish footballer
- Nina Moore Jamieson (1885–1932), Canadian writer
- Nina Jankowicz (born 1989), American researcher, author and commentator
- Nina Jazy (born 2005), German swimmer
- Nina Jeriček (born 1984), Slovenian handballer
- Nina Johnsrud (born 1959), Norwegian journalist
- Nina Jones (1871–1926), New Zealand artist and botanical illustrator
- Nina Kreutzmann Jørgensen, Greenlandic singer
- Nina Josu (born 1953), Moldovan writer and activist
- Nina Kajzba (born 2004), Slovenian footballer
- Nina Kalezić (born 1996), Montenegrin tennis player
- Nina Kamenik (born 1985), German ice hockey player
- Nina Kamneva (1916–1973), Soviet athlete and military engineer
- Nina Kaptsova (born 1978), Russian ballet dancer
- Nina Karlsson (born 1975), Swedish professional golfer
- Nina J. Karnovsky, American ecologist and ornithologist
- Nina Karpachova (born 1957), Ukrainian lawyer and politician
- Nina Kasniunas (born 1972), American political scientist and writer
- Nina Katchadourian (born 1968), American artist
- Nina Katerli (1934–2023), Soviet and Russian writer, publicist and activist
- Nina Kellgren (born 1948), British cinematographer
- Nina Kemppel (born 1970), American cross-country skier
- Nina Kennedy (born 1997), Australian pole vaulter
- Nina Gamble Kennedy, American classical pianist, orchestral conductor, filmmaker and writer
- Nina Keogh, Canadian puppeteer
- Nina Kessler (born 1988), Dutch cyclist
- Nina Khada, Franco-Algerian film director, screenwriter and film editor
- Nina Khadzhiyankova (born 1963), Bulgarian basketball player
- Nina Khrisanova (born 1994), Russian tennis player
- Nina Khrushcheva (disambiguation), multiple people
- Nina Kinert (born 1983), Swedish musician
- Nina King (born 1978), American college sports administrator
- Nina Kiri (born 1992), Serbian-Canadian actress
- Nina Kirso (1963–2020), Soviet and Ukrainian singer
- Nina Kläy (born 1989), Swiss taekwondo practitioner
- Nina Kleijweg (born 1938), Dutch fencer
- Nina Klenovska (born 1980), Bulgarian biathlete
- Nina Klinkel (born 1983), German politician
- Nina Kodaka (born 1989), Filipino-Japanese TV personality and host
- Nina Kogan, Russian painter
- Nina Koivumäki (born 1985), Finnish Olympic judoka
- Nina Kolarič (born 1986), Slovenian athlete
- Nina Kolundžić (born 1990), Serbian handball player
- Nina Koppang (born 2002), Swedish handball player
- Nina Korgan (1916–2009), American female softball pitcher
- Nina Korobkova (born 1926), Soviet rower
- Nina Koshetz (1891–1965), Ukrainian opera singer
- Nina Kossman, Russian-American writer, translator and artist
- Nina Kossova (born 1935), Soviet high jumper
- Nina Kost (born 1995), Swiss swimmer
- Nina Kostanjšek (born 1993), Slovenian rower
- Nina Kostova (born 1959), Bulgarian gymnast
- Nina Kostroff Noble (born 1959), American television producer
- Nina Kotova (born 1969), Russian cellist
- Nina Kovacheva, French-Bulgarian artist
- Nina Kpaho (born 1996), Ivorian footballer
- Nina Kraft (1968–2020), German triathlete
- Nina Kraljić (born 1992), Croatian singer-songwriter
- Nina Kraus, American neuroscientist
- Nina Kraviz (born 1989), Russian DJ
- Nina Krieger, Canadian politician
- Nina Kulagina (1926–1990), Russian psychokineticist
- Nina Kulikovskikh (born 1961), Russian politician
- Nina Kunzendorf (born 1971), German actress
- Nina Kuo, Chinese-American painter, photographer, sculptor, author, video artist and activist
- Nina Kuscsik (1939–2025), American long-distance athlete
- Nina Kusturica, Bosnian-born Austrian film director
- Nina LaCour, American author
- Nina Lagergren (1921–2019), Swedish businesswoman and half-sister of Raoul Wallenberg
- Nina Landis, Australian actress
- Nina Larsson (born 1976), Swedish politician
- Nina Lath Gupta (born 1959), Indian film producer
- Nina Laurie, British geographer
- Nina Lauwaert (born 1988), Belgian long-distance runner
- Nina Lawson (1926–2008), Scottish wig maker
- Nina Frances Layard (1853–1935), English poet, prehistorian, archaeologist and antiquary
- Nina Linta Lazarević (born 1976), Serbian theater, film and television actress, theatrical producer and playwright
- Nina Lee Aquino, Filipino-Canadian theatre director
- Nina Leen (1909–1995), Russian-born American photographer
- Nina Lemesh (born 1973), Ukrainian biathlete
- Nina Levitt, Canadian artist and educator
- Nina Li Chi (born 1961), Hong Kong actress
- Nina Ligon (born 1991), Thai equestrian
- Nina Linde (born 1980), German ice hockey player
- Nina Lisandrello, American actress
- Nina Liu (born 1977), Australian actress
- Nina Lobkovskaya (1924–2006), Russian sniper
- Nina Lobova (born 1957), Ukrainian handball athlete
- Nina Lola Bachhuber (born 1971), German artist
- Nina Lugovskaya (1918–1993), Russian artist
- Nina Lührßen (born 1999), German footballer
- Nina Lundström (born 1961), Swedish politician
- Nina Lussi (born 1994), American ski jumper
- Nina Lykke (gender studies scholar) (born 1949), Danish-Swedish gender studies scholar
- Nina Lykke (writer) (born 1965), Norwegian writer
- Nina MacLaughlin, American writer
- Nina Makarova (1908–1976), Russian composer
- Nina Makino (born 2005), American-Japanese singer and former child actress, member of the group NiziU
- Ņina Maksimova (born 1986), Latvian footballer
- Nina Malterud, Norwegian ceramist
- Nina Manucharyan (1885–1972), Armenian film actress
- Nina Manuel, Indian model, television host, and VJ
- Nina Marakina (born 1947), Ukrainian javelin thrower
- Nina Marker, Danish fashion model
- Nina Marković, Croatian physicist and professor
- Nina Marković-Khaze (born 1983), Australian political scientist and journalist
- Nina Martin, American choreographer, dancer and pedagogue
- Nina Marie Martínez, American novelist
- Nina Maslova (born 1946), Soviet and Russian actress
- Nina Mason Pulliam (1906–1997), American journalist, author and newspaper executive
- Nina Mathelus (born 2008), American footballer
- Nina Matsumoto (born 1984), Japanese-Canadian cartoonist
- Nina Matviyenko (1947–2023), Ukrainian singer
- Nina Mba (1944–2002), Australian author
- Nina McClelland (1930–2020), American chemist
- Nina Mae McKinney (1912–1967), American actress
- Nina Meinke (born 1993), German boxer
- Nina Menkes (born 1955), American filmmaker
- Nina Menkova (born 1945), Russian equestrian
- Nina Menshikova (1928–2007), Soviet actress
- Nina Merkulova (born 1945), Soviet skier
- Nina Metivier, British screenwriter
- Nina Meurisse (born 1988), French actress
- Nina Micić (born 1991), Serbian snowboarder
- Nina Miglionico (1913–2009), American lawyer
- Nina Milliken, American politician
- Nina Miranda (born 1970), Brazilian singer
- Nina Mitchell Wells (born 1950), American politician
- Nina Mittelham (born 1996), German table tennis player
- Nina Mjøberg (born 1964), Norwegian politician
- Nina Moise (1890–1968), American actress and director
- Nina Karin Monsen (born 1943), Norwegian moral philosopher and author
- Nina Morais Cohen (1855–1918), American suffragette
- Nina Morgana (1891–1986), American opera singer
- Nina Morgunova (born 1951), Russian middle-distance athlete
- Nina Morhunova (born 1951), Ukrainian middle-distance runner
- Nina Morić (born 1976), Croatian fashion model
- Nina Morozhenko (1928–2009), Ukrainian astronomer
- Nina Morozova (born 1989), Russian sprint hurdle athlete
- Nina Morrison (judge) (born 1970), American judge
- Nina Morrison (born 2000), Australian Australian rules footballer
- Nina Mozer (born 1964), Russian ice-skating coach
- Nina Mozetič (born 1983), Slovenian canoeist
- Nina Catherine Muir (1900–1981), New Zealand doctor
- Nina Müller (born 1980), German handball player
- Nina Munch-Søgaard (born 1987), Norwegian tennis player
- Nina Munk, Canadian-American journalist and nonfiction author
- Nina Munteanu, Canadian ecologist and novelist
- Nina Muradyan (born 1954), Armenian volleyball player
- Nina Murdoch (artist), British painter
- Nina Myskow (born 1946), Scottish journalist
- Nina Nadira (born 1992), Malaysian singer and actress
- Nina Nannar, British Asian journalist
- Nina Nastasia (born 1966), American singer-songwriter
- Nina Nawalowalo, New Zealand theatre director
- Nina Nayak (born 1953), Indian politician
- Nina Negri (1901–1981), Argentine-French artist
- Nina Nemtseva (1926–2021), Soviet-Uzbek scholar, archaeologist and architect
- Nina Nesbitt (born 1994), Scottish singer and songwriter
- Nina Nijstad (born 2003), Dutch footballer
- Nina Nikolova, Bulgarian climatologist
- Nina Nilsen (born 1970), Norwegian sport wrestler
- Nina Niss-Goldman (1892–1990), Russian artist
- Nina Nissly (born 1995), Russian-born American ice sledge hockey player
- Nina Nittinger (born 1976), German tennis player
- Nina Kamto Njitam (born 1983), Cameroonian handball player
- Nina Norshie (born 2001), Ghanaian footballer
- Nina Notman, German field hockey player
- Nina Novak (1923–2022), Venezuelan ballet dancer
- Nina Nunes (born 1985), American mixed martial arts fighter
- Nina Oberg Humphries, New Zealand artist
- Nina Obuljen Koržinek (born 1970), Croatian violinist and political scientist
- Nina Ellen Ødegård (born 1979), Norwegian actress
- Nina Ogilvie-Grant, 12th Countess of Seafield (1906–1969), Scottish peeress
- Nina Ognianova, Bulgarian journalist and activist
- Nina Olivette (1907–1971), American actress and dancer
- Nina Onilova (1921–1942), Soviet machine gunner
- Nina Ortlieb (born 1996), Austrian alpine skier
- Nina Osegueda (born Balvina Osegueda, born 1984), American opera singer
- Nina Ostanina (born 1955), Russian politician
- Nina Otkalenko (1928–2015), Russian middle-distance athlete
- Nina Ovcharenco (born 1984), Ukrainian road cyclist
- Nina Krebs Ovesen (born 1996), Danish cyclist
- Nina May Owens (1869–1959), Canadian teacher and painter
- Nina Owing (born 1958), Norwegian news anchor
- Nina Oyama (born 1993), Australian comedian, writer, actress and director
- Nina Paley (born 1968), American cartoonist and animator
- Nina Pandolfo, Brazilian street artist
- Nina Papavasiliou, Greek immunologist
- Nina Parker, American journalist and fashion designer
- Nina Patalon (born 1986), Polish footballer
- Nina Pavlova, Russian botanist
- Nina Paw (born 1949), Hong Kong actress
- Nina Pegova (born 1994), Russian professional golfer
- Nina Pekerman (born 1977), Israeli triathlete
- Nina Pereverzeva (1929–2022), Russian farmer and politician
- Nina Persson (born 1974), Swedish singer
- Nina Petković (born 1981), Montenegrin singer and television personality
- Nina Petri (born 1963), German actress
- Nina Petronzio (born 1979), American interior and furniture designer
- Nina Leonidovna Petrova (born 1955), Russian swimmer
- Nina Petrova (1893–1945), Russian sniper
- Nina Petushkova (born 1992), Russian figure skater
- Nina Pigulevskaya (1894–1970), Russian historian and orientalist
- Nina Pinto-Abecasis, (1971–2019), Israeli folklorist, writer and educator
- Nina Pinzarrone (born 2006), Belgian figure skater
- Nina Pirogova (born 1999), Russian ice hockey player
- Nina Planck, American food writer
- Nina Ponomaryova (1929–2016), Russian discus athlete
- Nina Popova (official) (1908–1994), Soviet civil servant
- Nina Popova (1922–2020), Russian-American ballet dancer
- Nina Potočnik (born 1997), Slovenian tennis player
- Nina Povey (born 1994), British figure skater
- Nina Power, British philosopher
- Nina Mingya Powles, New Zealand writer
- Nina Predanič (born 1997), Slovenian footballer
- Nina Preobrazhenskaya (born 1956), Ukrainian rower
- Nina Prinz (born 1982), German motorcycle racer
- Nina Proll (born 1974), Austrian actress
- Nina Proskura (born 1974), Ukrainian rower
- Nina Puikkonen (born 1979), American volleyball player
- Nina Pušlar (born 1988), Slovenian singer-songwriter
- Nina Wilcox Putnam (1888–1962), American writer
- Nina Py Brozovich, Bolivian activist
- Nina Quartero (1908–1985), American actress
- Nina Radovanović (born 1991), Serbian boxer
- Nina Radulović (born 1986), Serbian television presenter
- Nina Ragettli (born 1993), Swiss freestyle skier
- Nina Raginsky (born 1941), Canadian photographer
- Nina Raine (born 1975), English theatre director and playwright
- Nina Rangelova (born 1999), Bulgarian swimmer
- Nina Rapi, Greek writer
- Nina Raspopova (1913–2009), Russian pilot
- Nina Rautio (born 1957), Russian operatic soprano
- Nina Reis (born 1980), Swedish professional golfer
- Nina Reithmayer (born 1984), Austrian luger
- Nina Repeta (born 1967), American actress
- Nina Revoyr (born 1969), American novelist
- Nina Ricci (1883–1970), French-Italian fashion designer
- Nina Richard (born 2000), French footballer
- Nina Ridge, British weather forecaster on the BBC
- Nina Riggs (1977–2017), American writer and poet
- Nina Rillstone (born 1975), New Zealand long-distance athlete
- Nina Ritter (born 1981), German ice hockey player
- Nina Robertson (born 1996), Australian beauty queen
- Nina Rocheva (1948–2022), Russian cross-country skier
- Nina Pens Rode (1929–1992), Danish actress
- Nina Rohringer, German physicist
- Nina Romano (1901–1966), American actress
- Nina Romberg, American writer
- Nina Rønsted (born 1972), Danish botanist
- Nina Roscher (c. 1938–2001), American chemist
- Nina Chermak Rosenberg, American costume designer
- Nina Rosenblum (born 1950), American documentary film and television producer and director
- Nina Rosenwald, American political activist and philanthropist
- Nina Rosić (born 1990), Serbian volleyball player
- Nina Roth (born 1988), American curler
- Nina Ruge (born 1956), German journalist, TV presenter and author
- Nina Rung (born 1981), Swedish criminologist and anti-domestic violence activist
- Nina Rusakova (1915–1997), Soviet pilot
- Nina Ruslanova (1945–2021), Russian actress
- Nina Sabnani (born 1956), Indian filmmaker
- Nina Saeedyokota (born 1994), Japanese gymnast
- Nina Sailo (1906–1998), Finnish sculptor
- Nina Sandberg (born 1967), Norwegian politician
- Nina Sandt (1928–2003), German actress
- Nina Savina (born 1993), Belarusian long-distance runner
- Nina Saxon (born 1953), American graphic designer
- Nina Sazonova (1917–2004), Russian actor
- Nina Scheer (born 1971), German lawyer and politician
- Nina Schläfli (born 1990), Swiss politician
- Nina Schooler (born 1934), American psychologist
- Nina F. Schor, American pediatric neurologist
- Nina Schroth (born 1991), German weightlifter
- Nina Schultz (born 1998), Canadian-born Chinese track athlete
- Nina Schwalbe (born 1966), American public health researcher
- Nina Searl (1883–1955), English psychologist
- Nina Sedano (born 1964), German author
- Nina Sellars, Australian artist
- Nina Seničar (born 1985), Serbian actress and model
- Nina Šenk (born 1982), Slovenian composer
- Nina Serbina (born 1951), Soviet-Ukrainian high jumper
- Nina Serrano (born 1934), American poet
- Nina Sevening (1885–1958), English stage actress
- Nina Shamanova, Russian rower
- Nina Shashkova (born 1947), Russian luger
- Nina Shaternikova (1902–1982), Soviet actress
- Nina Shatskaya (actress) (1940–2021), Russian actress
- Nina Shatskaya (born 1966), Russian singer and actress
- Nina Shaw, American entertainment lawyer
- Nina Shea (born 1953), American lawyer
- Nina Shebalina (born 1946), Soviet cross-country skier
- Nina Shipman (born 1938), American film and television actress
- Nina Shtanski (born 1977), Transnistrian politician
- Nina Sibal (1948–2000), Indian diplomat and writer
- Nina Siciliana, Italian poet
- Nina Cook Silitch (born 1972), American ski mountaineer
- Nina Simon, American exhibition curator, writer, educator, and museum director
- Nina Simone (1933–2003), American singer, composer and civil rights activist
- Nina Simonovich-Efimova (1877–1948), Russian artist and puppeteers
- Nina Singh (born 1964), Indian Police service officer
- Nina Sio (born 1963), New Zealand rugby union player
- Nina Skeime (born 1962), Norwegian cross-country skier
- Nina Skorupska (born 1961), British engineer
- Nina Škottová (1946–2018), Czech politician
- Nina Smith, Danish economist and academic
- Nina Smoleyeva (born 1948), Russian volleyball player
- Nina Snaith, British mathematician
- Nina Søby (born 1956), Norwegian cyclist
- Nina Söderquist (born 1972), Swedish musical singer
- Nina Soldano (born 1963), Italian actress
- Nina Solheim (born 1979), Norwegian taekwondo practitioner
- Nina Solovey (1917–2006), Soviet military sniper
- Nina Sosanya (born 1969), English actress
- Nina Sosnina (1923–1943), Ukrainian resistance fighter
- Nina Sovinek (born 1985), Slovenian swimmer
- Nina Špikienė, Lithuanian chess player
- Nina Springle (born 1973), Australian politician
- Nina Stadler (born 1995), Swiss tennis player
- Nina Stadlinger (born 1980), Austrian equestrian
- Nina Stahr (born 1982), German politician
- Nina Stanger, English barrister
- Nina Stanisavljević (born 2004), Serbian swimmer
- Nina Stapelfeldt (born 1995), Swiss footballer
- Nina Statkevich (born 1944), Russian speed skater
- Nina Stemme (born 1963), Swedish singer
- Nina Sten-Knudsen, Danish painter
- Nina Sterckx (born 2002), Belgian weightlifter
- Nina Stibbe, British writer
- Nina Stojanović (born 1996), Serbian tennis player
- Nina Stojiljković (born 1996), French volleyball player
- Nina Stollewerk (1825–1914), Austrian singer, pianist and composer
- Nina Auchincloss Straight (born 1937), American author and journalist
- Nina Stroganova (1907–1994), Danish ballet dancer
- Nina Strokata Karavanska (1926–1998), Ukrainian microbiologist, immunologist and Soviet dissident
- Nina Sundbye (born 1944), Norwegian sculptor
- Nina Svetlanova (1932–2024), Russian-American concert pianist
- Nina Taborsky (born 1978), Austrian rhythmic gymnast
- Nina Tamaki (born 1996), Japanese voice actress and singer
- Nina Tandon, American biomedical engineer
- Nina Tangri, (fl. 2018–present) Canadian politician
- Nina Tannenwald, American political scientist
- Nina Tapio (born 1972), Finnish musical artist
- Nina Tapula, Zambian aviator
- Nina Tassler (fl. 2004–2015), American television executive
- Nina Taylor, Australian politician
- Nina Teicholz (born 1965), American journalist
- Nina Temple (born 1956), British politician
- Nina ten Broek (born 2001), Dutch water polo player
- Nina Tenge, German rapper
- Nina Ter-Osipyan (1909–2002), Soviet and Russian stage film actress
- Nina Thornhill, British chemical engineer
- Nina Tichman (born 1949), American pianist
- Nina Tikhonova (1910–1995), Russian-French ballet dancer and teacher
- Nina Tikkinen (born 1987), Finnish ice hockey player
- Nina Timofeeva (1935–2014), Russian ballet dancer
- Nina Tomaselli (born 1985), Austrian politician
- Nina Tonga, New Zealand-Tongan museum curator
- Nina Totenberg (born 1944), American journalist
- Nina Toussaint-White (born 1985), English actress
- Nina Turner, (born 1967), American politician
- Nina Tyurkina (born 1931), Soviet long jumper
- Nina Ulanova (born 1978), Russian ice skater
- Nina Ulyanenko (1923–2005), Russian navigator and pilot
- Nina Umanets (born 1956), Ukrainian rower
- Nina Uraltseva (born 1934), Russian mathematician
- Nina Urgant (1929–2021), Soviet and Russian actress
- Nina Usatova (born 1951), Russian actress
- Nina Vaca, American entrepreneur
- Nina Vajić (born 1948), Croatian lawyer and judge
- Nina Vale, American actress
- Nina Valetova (born 1958), American painter
- Nina Valsø (1962–2002), Norwegian playwright
- Nina van Dalum (born 2000), Dutch kickboxer
- Nina van den Brink (born 1966), Finnish-Swedish author and journalist
- Nina van Pallandt (born 1932), Danish singer (of Nina & Frederik) and actress
- Nina Vance (1914–1980), American entrepreneur
- Nina Vasan (born 1984), American psychiatrist
- Nina Vatatsy (1908–1997), Belarusian bibliographer and literary critic
- Nina Vatolina (1915–2002), Soviet poster artist
- Nina Vedeneyeva (1882–1955), Soviet physicist
- Nina Venkatesh (born 2005), Indian swimmer
- Nina Veselova (1922–1960), Russian painter
- Nina Vidal, American musical artist
- Nina Violić (born 1972), Croatian actress
- Nina Virchenko (born 1930), Ukrainian mathematician
- Nina Vislova (born 1986), Russian badminton player
- Nina Vyroubova (1921–2007), Russian-born French ballerina
- Nina Wadia (born 1968), British actress
- Nina Kindschi (born 1992), Swiss ice hockey player
- Nina Waisman, American new media artist
- Nina Y. Wang (born 1972), American judge
- Nina B. Ward (1885–1944), American painter
- Nina Warhurst (born 1980), British journalist
- Nina Warken (born 1979), German politician
- Nina Wayne (born 1943), American actress
- Nina Weckström (born 1979), Finnish badminton player
- Nina Wedell, evolutionary biologist
- Nina Weiss (born 1959), American artist
- Nina Wengert (born 1984), German rower
- Nina Williams (born 1990), American professional rock climber
- Nina Willner, American nonfiction author, a former intelligence officer and human rights activist
- Nina Windmüller (born 1987), German footballer
- Nina Winthrop (born 1956), American choreohrapher
- Nina Witoszek, Polish-Irish-Norwegian writer and research professor
- Nina Woodford (born 1971), Swedish songwriter
- Nina Bencich Woodside (1931–1997), American physician
- Nina Yankowitz, American visual artist
- Nina Yargekov (born 1980), French writer
- Nina Ye (born 2016), Taiwanese child actress
- Nina Yeryomina (1933–2016), Russian basketball player
- Nina Yevteyeva (born 1982), Russian speed skater
- Nina Ynares (born 1970), Filipino politician
- Nina C. Young (born 1984), American composer
- Nina Young (born 1966), Australian actress
- Nina Youshkevitch (1920–1998), Franco-Russian ballet dancer
- Nina Yuzhanina (born 1965), Ukrainian economist and politician
- Nina Žabjek (born 1998), Slovenian handball player
- Nina Zagat, of Tim and Nina Zagat, American entrepreneur and publisher
- Nina Zander (born 1990), German tennis player
- Nina Zanjani (born 1981), Swedish actress
- Nina Zhivanevskaya (born 1977), Russian swimmer
- Nina Zhuk (born 1934), Russian pair skater
- Nina Ziegenhals (born 1982), German ice hockey player
- Nina Zimmer (born 1973), German art historian
- Nina Žižić (born 1985), Montenegrin singer
- Nina Zulić (born 1995), Slovenian handball player
- Nina Zyuskova (born 1952), Ukrainian middle-distance athlete
- Li Nina (李妮娜, born 1983), Chinese aerial skier

== Nickname ==
- Mizz Nina, professional name of Shazrina binti Azman (born 1980), Malaysian fashion designer
- Nina (Spanish singer) (born 1932), professional name of Anna Maria Agustí Flores (born 1966), Spanish actress and singer
- Nina, former ring name of Lisa Mary Moretti, who has also been known as Ivory (wrestler), Tina Ferrari and Tina Moretti (born 1961), American professional wrestler
- Nina Amenta, nickname of Annamaria Beatrice Amenta, American computer scientist
- Nina Bara (born Frances Joan Baur, 1920–1985), American actress
- Nina Barka (born Marie Smirsky, 1908–1986), French-Ukrainian artist
- Nina Bassat, nickname of Janina Bassat (born 1939), leader in the Victorian Jewish community
- Nina Bo'nina Brown, stage name of Pierre Leverne Dease (born 1982), American drag performer
- Nina Bonaparte, pen name of Éléonore-Justine Ruflin (1832–1905), French writer and wife of Prince Pierre-Napoléon Bonaparte
- Nina Bouraoui, nickname of Yasmina Bouraoui (born 1967), French author
- Nina Boyle, nickname of Constance Antonina Boyle (1865–1943), British journalist
- Nina Burton, nickname of Eva Ulla Burton (born 1946), Swedish poet and writer
- Nina Campana (born Esperanza Susanna de Ybarrondo, 1897–1950), American actress
- Nina Campbell, nickname of Henrietta Sylvia Campbell (born 1945), English interior designer
- Nina Carter, (born Penelope Jane Mallett, 1952), English model and singer
- Nina Cassian, pen name of Renée Annie Cassian-Mătăsaru (1924–2014), Romanian poet, translator, journalist and composer
- Nina Childress, (born Christine Childress, 1961), French-American painter based in Paris
- Nina Chuba (born 1998), known professionally as Nina Katrin Kaiser, German singer
- Nina M. Davies, published under the co-pen name N. de Garis Davies (1881–1965), Scottish egyptologist
- Nina de Callias (1843–1884), professional name of Anne-Marie Gaillard, French composer, pianist, writer and salon hostess
- Nina de la Fuente, stage name of Vicente Arias, Mexican drag performer
- Nina Dimitrieff, also seen as Nina Dmitrieff and later as Nina Massell, Russian-American soprano opera singer
- Nina Dobrev, professional name of Nikolina Kamenova Dobreva (born 1989), Bulgarian actress raised in Canada
- Nina Donelli, professional name of Nina Vodušek (born 1997), Slovenian singer
- Nina Dopamine, stage name of Nian Hu, American musician
- Nina Dunic, the pen name of Nina Dragicevic (born c. 1983), Canadian writer and journalist
- Nina Fehr Düsel (born 1980), professional name of Ursina Anna Fehr Düsel, Swiss jurist and politician
- Nina Eik-Nes (née Nina Lange Dahler, 1900–1997), Norwegian politician
- Nina Fedorova, pen name of Antonina Riasanovsky, (1895–1985), Russian author
- Nina Flowers, stage name of Jorge Luis Flores Sanchez (born 1974), Puerto Rican drag queen and celebrity
- Nina Fuentes (born Andreina Mercedes del Carmen Fuentes Angarita, born 1968), Venezuelan art collector, curator, philanthropist, business woman and art dealer
- Nina Gademan (born 2003), Dutch racing driver
- Nina García, nickname of Ninotchka García (born 1965), Colombian fashion journalist and critic
- Nina Girado (full name Marifil Nina Barinos Girado-Enriquez, born 1980), Filipina singer
- Nina Hagen, nickname of Catharina Hagen (born 1955), German singer
- Nina Hartley, stage name of Marie Louise Hartman (born 1959), American pornographic actress
- Nina F. Ichikawa, American writer and agricultural activist
- Nina Iliescu, professional name of Elena Iliescu (born 1930), First Lady of Romania (1989–1996, 2000–2004)
- Nina Jobst-Smith, professional name of Katarina Mina Louise Jobst-Smith (born 2001), German-Canadian ice hockey player
- Nina Eva Vida Jones (1882–1966), Australian racing motorist
- Nina Kaczorowski, aka Nina K (born 1975), American actress, stunt woman, model and dancer
- Nina H. Kennard, professional name of Annie née Homan-Mulock Kennard (1844–1926), Irish author
- Nina Las Vegas, stage name of Nina Elizabeth Agzarian (born 1984), Australian radio host, DJ and music producer
- Nina Liedtke, nickname of Antonina Liedtke, Polish writer and editor
- Nina Litovtseva, professional name of Nina Nikolayevna Levestamm (1878–1956), Russian actor and theatre director
- Nina Lowry, professional name of Noreen Margaret Lowry (1925–2017), British barrister and judge
- Nina Matejić, professional name of Aleksandar Milenkovic Lemi (born 2005), Serbian footballer
- Nina Morato (born Stéphanie Morato, 1966), French singer-songwriter
- Nina Murdoch (1890–1976), professional name of Madoline Murdoch, Australian writer and journalist
- Nina Myral, stage name of Eugénie, Hortense Gruel (1884–1975), French actress
- Nina Niovilla, professional name of Antonina Elżbieta Petrykiewicz, Polish film director, screenwriter, actress, translator and teacher
- Nina Pacari (born María Estela Vega Conejo, 1961), Kichwa/Ecuadorian indigenous leader
- Nina Payne (1890–1971), American dancer
- Nina Pillard, nickname of Cornelia Thayer Livingston Pillard (born 1961), American Judge
- Nina Polan (born Janina Katelbach; 1927–2014), Polish actress and theatre director
- Nina Radojičić, nickname of Danica Prodanović (born 1989), Serbian singer
- Nina Ramirez, nickname of Janina Sara Maria Ramirez (born 1980), British historian and TV presenter
- Nina Rasul, nickname of Santanina Tillah Rasul (born Santanina Centi Tillah, 1930–2024), Filipina politician
- Nina Ricci (born Maria Nielli; 1883–1970), Italian fashion designer
- Nina Rignano, professional name of Constanza Rignano, Italian philanthropist
- Nina Rindt (also formerly known as Nina Hood, Viscountess Bridport; born 1943), Finnish fashion model
- Nina Rodríguez, professional name of Carolina Rodríguez Ferrero (born 1985), Colombian pop singer-songwriter and model
- Nina Romano (born Isabel Craven Dilworth; (1901–1966), American actress
- Nina Sadur (born Nina Nikolayevna Kolesnikova; 1950–2023), Russian prose writer and playwright
- Nina Salaman, nickname of Paulina Ruth Salaman (1877–1925), British poet and translator
- Nina Samuels, better known by her ring name Samantha Allen (born 1988), English professional wrestler
- Nina Shivdasani (born 1946), also known as NinaSugati SR and NinaSugati SR Shivdasani Rovshen, Indian filmmaker
- Nina Sicilia, nickname of Alejandrina Sicilia Hernández (born 1962), Venezuelan model and Miss International 1985
- Nina Siemaszko, nickname of Antonina Jadwiga Siemaszko (born 1970), American actress
- Nina Simone, professional name of Eunice Kathleen Waymon (1933–2003), American singer, songwriter, musician, arranger, and civil rights activist
- Nina Spreitzer (born 1998, Žabjek), Slovenian handball player
- Nina Schenk Gräfin von Stauffenberg (1913–2006), nickname of Elisabeth Magdalena Schenk Gräfin von Stauffenberg, wife of Claus Schenk Graf von Stauffenberg, failed assassin of Adolf Hitler
- Nina Sublatti (born Nina Sulaberidze, 1995), Georgian singer, songwriter, calligrapher and model
- Nína Tryggvadóttir, nickname of Jónína Tryggvadóttir (1913–1968), Icelandic artist
- Nina Tayeb, nickname of Ninet Tayeb (born 1983), Israeli entertainer
- Nina Vanna, stage name of Nina Yazykova Kind Hakim Provatoroff (1899–1953), Belarusian actress
- Nina Wang, (born Kung Yu Sum, 1937–2007), Chinese billionaire
- Nina West, stage name of Andrew Levitt (born 1977), American drag queen, actor and singer
- Nina Zilli, stage name of Maria Chiara Fraschetta (born 1980), Italian singer-songwriter

== Fictional characters ==
- Nina Lacalle, a character in the television series Atracción x4
- Nina from You Were Never Really Here, film by Lynne Ramsay
- Nina, the main character of Nina Needs to Go!
- Nina, the title character of Nina's World
- Nina the Killer, a character from the creepypasta of the same name
- Nina, a character in the Disney Junior television series Imagination Movers
- Nina, a Costa Rican Wild Kratts Kids girl from the hybrid/live action series Wild Kratts
- Nina Ash, from the American television series Angel
- Nina Azarova, from the American webseries, The OA
- Nina Bailey, from Home and Away
- Nina Borowski, a main character in The Object of My Affection
- Nina Brown, from the BBC soap opera EastEnders
- Nina Bulsara, from Doctors
- Nina Caliente, from the life simulation video games The Sims 2, The Sims 3 and The Sims 4
- Nina Callas, from The Clique series of books
- Nina Campbell, from the American sitcom 3rd Rock from the Sun
- Nina Cortex, from the Crash Bandicoot series of games
- Nina Cortlandt, from the soap opera All My Children
- Nina Del Marco, a character in the Netflix series Grand Army
- Nina Einstein, from the anime Code Geass
- Nina Flores, from Clifford's Puppy Days
- Nina Fortner, from Naoki Urasawa's anime Monster
- Nina Frost, from the book Perfect Match by Jodi Picoult
- Nina Gilbert, from Home and Away
- Nina Gorzsky, Magneto’s daughter in X-Men: Apocalypse
- Nina Gupta, from the BBC soap opera EastEnders
- Nina Harper, from the animated series Braceface
- Nina Harris, from the BBC soap opera EastEnders
- Nina Iseri, the main character of Girls Band Cry
- Nina Jarvis, from the USA Network science fiction television series The 4400
- Nina Katz, Aiden's girlfriend following Carrie Bradshaw, aka "The Face Girl" of Sex and the City
- Nina Lucas, from the ITV soap opera Coronation Street
- Nina Mandal, from Coronation Street
- Nina Martin, a character from House of Anubis
- Nina Mauricius–Sanders, a character from Goede tijden, slechte tijden
- Nina Morgan, from The Family Plan
- Nina Myers, a terrorism analyst in the TV series 24
- Nina Natsume, from the Urara Meirocho
- Nina Neckerly, a giraffe from Camp Lazlo
- Nina Olivera, from Home and Away
- Nina Pickering, werewolf from the TV series Being Human
- Nina Price, also known as Vampire by Night, a Marvel Comics character
- Nina Purpleton, female lead character in Mobile Suit Gundam 0083: Stardust Memory
- Nina Reeves, from General Hospital
- Nina Rosario, from Lin-Manuel Miranda's musical In The Heights
- Nina Sakura, from Ultra Maniac
- Nina Salazar-Roberts, a main character in the Disney+ TV series, High School Musical: The Musical: The Series
- Nina Sayers, from the 2010 film Black Swan
- Nina Sergeevna Krilova, former KGB officer in The Americans
- Nina Mikhailovna Zarechnaya, from Anton Chekhov's play The Seagull
- Nina Sharp, from Fringe
- Nina Simonetti, a character in the Argentine-Mexican Disney Channel Latin America telenovela Soy Luna
- Nina Skalka, from the American animated sitcom The Simpsons
- Nina Swanson, from the anime series Glitter Force (originally named Yui Midorikawa)
- Nina Thumbell, the daughter of Thumbelina from the Mattel franchise Ever After High
- Nina Tucker, from the Australian soap opera Neighbours
- Nina Tucker, from the anime Fullmetal Alchemist
- Nina Van Horn, from American TV show, Just Shoot Me!
- Nina van Rooyen, from the book Fiela's Child by Dalene Matthee
- Nina Vorhees, nickname of Nitia Vorhees, from The Passage
- Nina Wadekar, a Season 2 contestant in Fetch! with Ruff Ruffman
- Nina Walsh, from Smart_Guy
- Nina Wáng, from the anime Mai Otome
- Nina Watari, a character from the video game Fossilized Wonders in the Touhou Project franchise
- Nina Webster, from the soap opera The Young and the Restless
- Nina Williams, a fictional assassin from the Tekken series of games
- Nina Williams, alternate name of Nene Williams, from Neighbours
- Nina Windia, from the Breath of Fire series of games
- Nina Yamada, from Mamotte! Lollipop
- Nina Yamada, a character from Blue Reflection Ray
- Nina Zenik, a character in the Six of Crows duology
- Nina, a character from the TV series Pocoyo

== Surname ==
- Joe Nina, stage name of Makhosini Henry Xaba, (born 1974), South African singer
- Julián Apasa Nina, birthname of Túpac Katari (c. 1750–1781), Bolivian rebel
- Lorenzo Nina (1812–1885), Italian prelate
- Ur-Nina (fl. c. 2550 BC–2500 BC), Iraqi king

== See also ==
- Nina (disambiguation)
- Nana (surname)
- Nena (name)
- Nia (given name)
- Nika (given name)
- Nima (name)
- Nin (surname)
- Nina (disambiguation)
- Niña (name)
- Nine (disambiguation)
- Nino (name)
- Niño (name)
- Ning (surname)
- Ninja (disambiguation)
- Nipa (disambiguation)
- Nita (given name)
- Niwa (disambiguation)
- Nuna (disambiguation)
- Cecilia Bowes-Lyon, Countess of Strathmore and Kinghorne, British royal known as Cecilia Nina Bowes-Lyon
- Saint Nino (anglicized to Nina), an Eastern-orthodox saint
- Nina Never Knew, song
