= Freestyle (Russian group) =

Ukrainian musical group

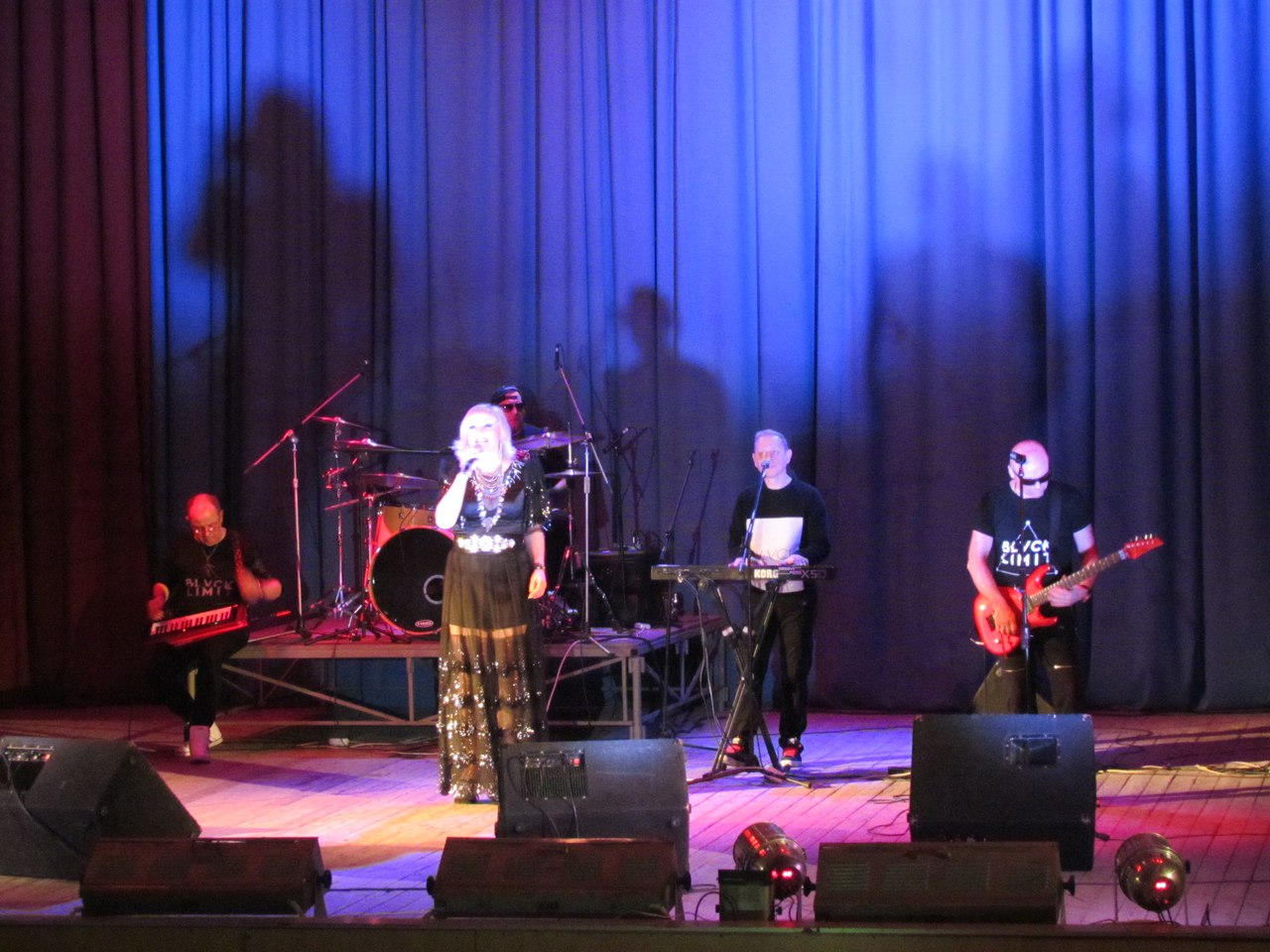
Freestyle performing in 2016.

Freestyle is a Soviet and Ukrainian musical group that was formed in Poltava in November 1988. The leader, composer and producer of the group is Anatoly Rozanov. The genre of music the group perform is electropop and eurodisco. The group were awarded a Golden Gramophone Award.

== History ==
In the early years, the frontman of the group was Vadim Kazachenko, but in 1992 he left the band, starting a solo musical activity. He was replaced by Sergey Dubrovin.All of the groups songs were produced by the groups permanent producer Anatoly Rozanov.

In the 1995, the song "Oh, what a woman!" became the groups most famous song. The songwriter Tatyana Nazarova later became involved in a dispute with the group over royalties. She had collaborated with the group for seven years. A copyright specialist from the All-Russian Intellectual Property Organization (WIPO), commented on the scandal, confirmed that Rozanov couldn't forbid Kazachenko to perform the song as according to law, the user of the musical work is not the performer, but the organizers of concerts and broadcasting companies who broadcast it. In 2011, the group won a copyright lawsuit.

On June 1, 2018, the lead singer of the group Nina Kirso suffered a severe stroke. For some time "Freestyle" worked as a solely male cast, several charity concerts were held with the participation of Ukrainian pop stars; all fees from these concerts were transferred to Nina's treatment. According to the doctors' conclusion, Nina Kirso could no longer return to active life, and since February 2019, a new soloist Nata Nedina has been in the Freestyle group. On April 30, 2020, Nina Kirso died. On September 1, 2020, former soloist Sergei Vyazovsky died at the age of 47.

In 2021, One of Freestyle's songs, "Goodbye Forever" (Прощай Навеки) gained popularity after YouTubers Omnistar East and HardCrypt had uploaded it. However, in 2022 Omnistar East's video and later HardCrypt's videos were both removed by copyright claim which the band Freestyle work with.

== Discography ==
=== Albums ===
- February 1989 - "Get it!"
- August 1989 - Get it! - take 2"
- March 1990 - Get it! - take 3"
- July 1991 - "Freestyle-4"
- May 1992 - Get it! - take 5"
- December 1993 - Tormented Heart
- October 1995 - "Oh, what a woman"

== See also ==
- Pop music in Ukraine
