= Russian Symphony Orchestra Society =

- Orchestra
- Advertisement for the orchestra's first performance on January 7, 1904
- Founded: 1903
- Disbanded: 1922
- Location: New York City

The Russian Symphony Orchestra Society (also known simply as the Russian Symphony Orchestra) was founded in 1903 in New York City by Modest Altschuler, and functioned for fifteen years.

Oscar Levant described the orchestra as having constituted "a school for concertmasters"; among its members were Frederic Fradkin (concertmaster of the Boston Symphony), Maximilian Pilzer (concertmaster of the New York Philharmonic), Ilya Skolnik (concertmaster of the Detroit Symphony), and Louis Edlin (concertmaster of the National Orchestral Association). Nikolai Sokoloff was the Russian Symphony Orchestra's concertmaster for a period before he became the first conductor of the Cleveland Orchestra in 1918. Film music conductors Nathaniel Shilkret and Nat Finston were also Russian Symphony Orchestra alumni, as was trumpeter Harry Glantz. The orchestra also formed the backbone of the New Music Society of America, founded in December 1905.

They performed the New York premieres of numerous pieces by Sergei Rachmaninoff, Igor Stravinsky and Alexander Scriabin, including Stravinsky's first symphony (the Symphony in E-flat) and The Firebird.

== History ==
=== The early years ===
The orchestra's debut public performance was at Cooper Union Hall on January 7, 1904, and, according to Leonard Slatkin, featured works by Mikhail Glinka, Pyotr Ilyich Tchaikovsky, Henryk Wieniawski, and the American premiere of Rachmaninoff's The Rock. However, the New York Times of January 3, 1904, lists the program as consisting of the Overture from Glinka's Ruslan and Lyudmila, a baritone aria from Borodin's Prince Igor, an intermezzo from Mikhail Ippolitov-Ivanov, a Russian dance by Eduard Nápravník and the symphonic suite Scheherazade by Nikolai Rimsky-Korsakov; The Times of January 24 that same year mentions their second concert as including Wieniawski's Souvenir de Moscou and reviewing a later concert in the series mentions a performance of "'The Cliff' by Rachmaninoff," presumably the same piece as The Rock.

For the 1904–1905 season, the orchestra, now expanded to 85 musicians, performed six concerts at Carnegie Hall, featuring works by a broad range of Russian composers, including a violin concerto by Julius Conus. The Times summarized the season as "resplendent with novelties," and praised their "enthusiasm" and the "absorbing interest" of their selected material, but was critical of the technical quality of their performances, particularly in comparison with their initial series of concerts at Cooper Union. That season, they were the first to use a celesta in concert performance in the United States. Among many Russian pieces given their American premieres that season was Rimsky-Korsakov's The Tale of Tsar Saltan; the fourth concert of the season consisted entirely of works that had never before been presented in New York: Vasily Kalinnikov's first symphony, Anton Arensky's suite "Silhouettes", and excerpts from Modest Mussorgsky's opera Khovanshchina.

The next year, their six Saturday night concerts at Carnegie Hall were supplemented by three "popular price" concerts there on Sunday afternoons. The orchestra formed a relationship with Vasily Safonov. Rachmaninoff was engaged as a guest conductor and piano soloist for concerts of his music performed on April 7–8, 1906, and Safonov's former pupil, pianist Joseph Lhévinne, was brought over to make his American debut; both were in their early thirties at the time, as was composer Vasily Zolotarev, whose Rhapsodie Hébraïque was also performed that season at Safonov's suggestion. Rhapsodie hébraïque, presented on the last two days of 1905, was based on secular Jewish melodies that the Times characterized as "the musical equivalent of Yiddish." Pianist Raoul Pugno also participated in the season as a soloist, playing Rachmaninoff's second piano concerto. Now expanded to 90 musicians, the orchestra was becoming an increasingly professional affair with, as the Times put it, "soloists of the first rank."

Another of those soloists was Giuseppe Campanari, a baritone associated with the Metropolitan Opera. The chaos of the Revolution of 1905 prevented sending scores from Russia for the orchestra to accompany Campanari on arias from Tchaikovsky's Iolanta and Queen of Spades (Pique Dame), and the performances were almost canceled. The only known copy of even the texts of the arias that could readily be found in New York was a German translation. The situation was finally rescued by "a little music store on Canal Street" which had held the relevant scores in stock, unsold for about a decade after they had been purchased from a Russian tenor in need of cash.

Pianist Josef Lhévinne likewise had an extremely difficult time escaping the turmoil of revolution in Moscow to come to New York to play with the Russian Symphony and others, facing danger from both the revolutionists and the government. Although his troubles were compounded by an injury to a finger, his January 27, 1906, performance featured Anton Rubinstein's Fifth Concerto, and drew a very favorably review from the Times.

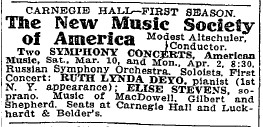

In late December 1905, Altschuler and others announced the formation of the New Music Society of America, soliciting "serious new work" from American composers, with the Russian Symphony functioning as the group's orchestra. A first Carnegie Hall concert originally scheduled for February 19 apparently never occurred, because the New York Times refers to a March 10 concert as the group's first; another concert took place April 2, 1906. The most prominent pieces at that first concert Edward MacDowell's Indian Suite and Second Concerto (hardly "new": although only in his forties, MacDowell was already in his final illness at the time); the orchestra also performed Henry F. Gilbert's Salammbô's Invocation to Tänith and Arthur Shepherd's Overture Joyeuse. The second concert featured violinist Maud Powell as a soloist; works included George Whitefield Chadwick's Melpomene overture, the premiere of a violin concerto by Henry Holden Huss, and premieres of pieces by David Stanley Smith and Frederick Converse.

That season, the March 17, 1906, concert featured the first American performance of the young Reinhold Glière's Symphony No 1 in E-flat major, Op. 8 (composed 1900) as well as American premieres of pieces by César Cui a Cossack dance by Alexander Serov, who had died 35 years earlier in an era when Russian music had little currency in America, and 'a new concerto for violin, by Mlinarski," presumably the Concerto in D minor (composed c. 1897) by the Polish composer Emil Młynarski. However, the unrest in Russia at that time prevented Rachmaninoff from visiting America, scuttling his planned April 7 performance. Instead, violinist and composer Émile Sauret was featured, performing Antonín Dvořák's Violin Concerto in A Minor. The same concert included two pieces by composer Anton Arensky, who had died on February 25.

=== An established orchestra ===
By the end of the 1906 season, the Russian Symphony Orchestra was an established part of the New York music scene. In all, the New York Times counted six New York premieres by the Russian Symphony Orchestra as such in 1906, and three more by the New Music Society. On May 25, the Society announced that Altschuler would be retained as Director for three more years, with Russian Ambassador Baron Roman Rosen continuing as honorary president. Looking forward to the 1906-1907 musical season, the Times counted them among the city's major orchestras, along with the New York Philharmonic, New York Symphony Orchestra, Peoples' Symphony Concerts, and Sam Franko's American Symphony.

The 1906-7 season saw an appearance by pianist and composer Alexander Scriabin under the direction of his (and Altschuler's) conservatory teacher Vasily Safonov. An anonymous New York Times review praised Scriabin's playing, while finding him immature as a composer. The same reviewer panned Alexander Glazunov's Third Symphony, which had its American premiere on this occasion: "[W]hat Russian music the conductor's of the more cosmopolitan orchestras have left for the Russians to put down on their programmes as given 'for the first time' may have been rejected rather than overlooked." Apparently undaunted by that criticism, the orchestra announced two days later that its concert of January 17 would feature American premieres of Rachmaninoff's Spring cantata and Jean Sibelius's Karelia overture, though apparently Rimsky-Korsakov's Antar was substituted for the Rachmininoff. The Times doubled down in its criticism: "[M]any of the things by the Russian composers that we do not know seem upon presentation hardly worth knowing. ... Antar ... is no symphony by any recognized definition of the term... This would be nothing against the music if it could win acceptance for itself as music, which it did not last evening." While continuing its skepticism toward recent Russian music, the Times had high praise for soloist Fannie Bloomfield Zeisler's February 7, 1907 performance of Anton Rubinstein's already well-known D Minor Concerto (No. 4), though suggesting that the orchestra "show[ed] a lack of rehearsal with the pianist." The fifth of six concerts that season on February 28, featuring a return by pianist Josef Lhévinne, consisted entirely of Russian pieces performed for the first time in America, although they were not recent works. The orchestral introduction of Mussorgsky's The Fair at Sorochyntsi and Rubinstein's Caprice Russe were both by composers who had died before the turn of the century. Mikhail Ippolitov-Ivanov's Iveria Suite (1896) and Alexander Scriabin's First Symphony (completed 1900), while also not particularly recent, were at least by then-living composers, and Scriabin was present for the occasion.

That summer, Altschuler traveled to Europe to engage soloists for the 1907–1908 season, which began with a special concert November 10 at their largest venue to date: accompanying violinist Jan Kubelik at the New York Hippodrome. (A similar performance was given the following year, March 15, 1908.) Four days later they began their regular season at Carnegie Hall with Russian ambassador Baron Rosen in attendance, and with a program consisting largely of American premieres of Russian pieces: Alexander Glazunov's Symphony No. 8, composed roughly two years earlier; arrangements of Russian folk songs by Glazunov, Anatoly Lyadov, and Rimsky-Korsakov; and Mussorgsky's "Great Gate of Kiev". The program also featured the American debut of young Russian violinist Lea Luboshutz (listed at the time as Laya Luboshiz), who received eight curtain calls for her solo on Tchaikovsky's Violin Concerto. She was not the only notable female soloist to play with the orchestra that season: on February 13, 1908, cellist May Muklé performed Karl Davydov's Cello Concerto No. 2 in A minor.

=== Broader recognition and touring ===
1908 also brought unprecedented recognition from Russia itself. The tsar granted the Order of Saint Stanislaus to orchestra president Frank Seymour Hastings in recognition of his promotion of Russian music in America.

For 1908–1909, the orchestra reduced its Carnegie Hall season from six performances to four, and began taking on other performance opportunities. At Carnegie Hall, they continued to present notable soloists: the debut of Mischa Elman (19 years old at the time), a return by Josef Lhévinne, and also an appearance by Alexander Petschnikoff. After a November 16, 1908, tryout in New Haven, Connecticut, on February 11, 1909, they collaborated with the Ben Greet Players on a Carnegie Hall performance of Shakespeare's A Midsummer Night's Dream incorporating Mendelssohn's incidental music, a performance that was repeated at Lake George on August 30 and at Carnegie Hall on New Year's Day 1910. These performances constituted the first time Mendelssohn's music was performed in conjunction with the play in the United States. The two groups collaborated further, including a 1910 production of Shakespeare's The Tempest and a series of performances in the 1910–1911 season which repeated these pieces and added As You Like It, The Merry Wives of Windsor, Macbeth, and Sakuntala.

Besides a broader variety of New York performances, the orchestra toured extensively. Although they had already toured in December 1907, when the New York Times mentions them traveling to "Chicago, Cincinnati, Cleveland, Madison, Wis. and other cities," bringing along pianists Ernest Hutcheson and Ernest Schelling, their 1908 touring plans extended as far as the West Coast. Their tours could involve large numbers of performances. For example, a newspaper from Pittsburgh, Pennsylvania shows the orchestra performing four separate concerts (at 2 p.m., 4 p.m., 7:30 p.m. and 9:30 p.m.) on a single Wednesday in September 1911. The programs were each entirely different, and the music ranged from Beethoven through Richard Wagner, Verdi and Puccini to Sibelius and Scriabin.

=== The 1910s ===
The orchestra began the 1910s with a premiere of a different sort. After a January 1 Carnegie Hall reprise of their Midsummer Night collaboration with Ben Greet, on January 20 their second performance of the new decade introduced dancer Maud Allan to the New York audience. Although American-born, Allan had begun her dancing career in England and Europe, and this was her first American appearance. Like Isadora Duncan and Loie Fuller, Allan choreographed for herself, using existing classical pieces. On this occasion she danced a piece on Ancient Greek themes, using music from Anton Rubinstein, Mendelssohn, Chopin, and Grieg. The performance alternated Allan's dances with straight orchestral performances. A concert a week later featured Rachmaninoff as a guest conductor for the American premiere of his Isle of the Dead and as a soloist on his Piano Concerto No. 2. Further performances with Allan followed, with the dancer performing her signature Visions of Salomé, among other pieces. On April 4, the orchestra played a benefit for Russian immigrants at the Waldorf-Astoria, featuring several musical soloists as well as ballet dancers Anna Pavlova and Mikhail Mordkin.

The 1910–1911 season featured five Carnegie Hall concerts interspersed with numerous out-of-town shows and followed by a 20-week national tour. Their New York season began November 17 with a concert that included a very different interpretation of Rachmaninoff's Symphony No. 2, which they had premiered in 1901 and which had meanwhile become a "celebrated" and much-played work. After discussions with the composer, Altschuler had sped up the tempi and his reading of the piece had "radically changed". The concert also featured two American premieres of pieces by Anatoly Lyadov—Kikimora and Volshebnoye ozero (The Enchanted Lake), both written in 1909—Tchaikovsky's 1812 Overture, and several songs sung by German baritone Alexander Heinemann. The December 1 concert featured the U.S. debut of Canadian-born violinist Kathleen Parlow, who had grown up largely in San Francisco and had become a professional musician in Europe. The New York Times reviewer described her performance of Tchaikovsky's Violin Concerto as a "remarkable achievement" and praised her "unexpected authority", and would have equally high praise for her "consummate technical accuracy...beauty of tone...spirit...[and]fire" when she returned to play Henryk Wieniawski's Violin Concerto No. 2 the following February 2. The concert was also the American premier of Stravinsky's Feu d'artifice (Fireworks). Starting four days later, they provided accompaniment for two-week run of Maeterlinck's tragedy Mary Magdalene at The New Theatre. This was the world premiere of that play, and the first U.S. performance of any Maeterlinck play.

A January 19, 1911, concert featured German-Polish pianist and composer Xaver Scharwenka as the soloist on his own Piano Concerto No. 1 in B-flat minor, as well as the American premiere of the Introduction and Wedding Procession from Rimsky-Korsakov's opera The Golden Cockerel; the concert also featured Rimsky-Korsakov's Christmas Eve Suite and the American premiere of a waltz that Tchaikovsky had written for The Nutcracker but omitted from the final version, and closed with Tchaikovsky's Marche Slave. The February 2 concert featured the American premiere of Robert Kajanus' Finnish Rhapsody, a return of Rachmaninoff's The Rock (which they had played in their second concert ever), and the return of violinist Kathleen Parlow performing the abovementioned Wieniawski concerto. The final concert of the season, February 16, featured several solo vocalists (including Nina Dimitrieff) and a 65-voice women's chorus, the St. Cecelia Club, for Altschuler's own arrangement of a series of excerpts from Tchaikovsky's opera Eugene Onegin, as well as the American premiere of Rachmaninoff's Fantasie for two pianos, featuring Marie Cracrost and Raymond L. Havens, and Alexander Glazunov's From the Middle Ages.

After a transcontinental tour, they came back to New York that summer to offer a series of eight concerts at Madison Square Garden in late June and early July, aimed at a broader public than could usually attend orchestra concerts. Through arrangements with working people's organizations such as the Wage Earners' Theatre Leagues, a family of four to attend as cheaply as a total of 50 cents, the equivalent of about $16 in 2023. Each concert was on a different theme: Russian, French, Italian, Slavic and Scandinavian, German and Wagner, Symphony, Pop, and International.

Late that summer, concertmaster Nikolai Sokoloff quit the orchestra along with about half a dozen other members. The orchestra's management claimed that this stemmed from Sokoloff's anger over what he perceived as another musician's flirting with Sokoloff's wife; Sokoloff insisted that the split was "purely and simply a matter of business." Karl Klein, son of Bruno Oscar Klein, was appointed to replace him.
