= Shaelin Jornigan =

Shaelin Jornigan is an American painter. Her works have been exhibited at Central Features Contemporary Art and Pacific Exhibits. A dedicated exhibit of her paintings was held at the Orpheum Community Hub in 2018. She was a winner of the 2018 West edition of New American Paintings.
