= Nina Brown =

Nina Brown may refer to:

- Nina Brown (tennis), British–American tennis player
- Nina Brown Baker, née Brown, American author
- Nina Brown (EastEnders), a character from the soap opera EastEnders

== See also ==
- Nina Browne, American librarian and archivist
