= Central Features Contemporary Art =

Coordinates: 35°5′5″N 106°39′13″W

Founded in 2014 by Nancy Zastudil, Central Features Contemporary Art is a contemporary art gallery located in downtown Albuquerque, New Mexico. The gallery exhibits a range of visual media but its focus is on the importance of art-making and the roles artists play in environmental and social issues. The gallery participates in Albuquerque’s creative economy by partnering with local artists and businesses to present events and programs that highlight collaboration including an artist-led dinner with Dig & Serve, On the Map: Unfolding Albuquerque Art + Design, and PhotoSummer. Included in the Central Features exhibition program is Pacific Exhibits, a downtown Albuquerque window exhibition space dedicated to showcasing local artists.

The gallery roster of artists include primarily emerging and mid-career artists based in Albuquerque including Nina Elder, Jami Porter Lara, Jessamyn Lovell, Jennifer Nehrbass, and Raychael Stine.

== History ==
Nancy Zastudil relocated to Albuquerque, New Mexico, from Houston, Texas, where she worked as a freelance arts writer and curator and held the position of Associate Director of the Cynthia Woods Mitchell Center for the Arts at the University of Houston. In Albuquerque, before opening Central Features, she launched a temporary downtown visiting artist exhibition program called Show Up Show Down as well as an exhibition window called Pacific Exhibits.
