= Nena (name) =

Nena is a given name, nickname and sometimes a surname. It is an English and Spanish feminine given name that is a diminutive form of Antonina and Giannina and thus an alternate form of Nina used in United States, most of Canada, Mexico, Guatemala, Honduras, Nicaragua, El Salvador, Costa Rica, Western Panama, Cuba, Dominican Republic, Colombia, Venezuela, Guyana, Ecuador, Peru, Chile, Bolivia, Argentina, Uruguay, Paraguay, Falkland Islands, Australia, New Zealand, Papua New Guinea, Philippines, Peninsular Malaysia, Singapore, India, Pakistan, Spain, England, Wales, Scotland, Northern Ireland, Republic of Ireland, Guyana, Liberia, Sierra Leone, Ghana, Namibia, South Africa, Botswana, Zimbabwe, Zambia, Malawi, Tanzania, Uganda, Kenya, Sudan, South Sudan, Ethiopia, Cameroon and Nigeria. It is also an Afroasiatic feminine given name used throughout Africa and a South Slavic feminine short form of Nevenka and Nevena used in Slovenia as a given name and in other South Slavic countries as a nickname. People bearing it include:

== Given name ==
- Nena Blake (1887–1924), Canadian-American actress, born Nena Naomi Fry
- Nena Danevic, film editor nominated for her work on Amadeus
- Nena de Brennecke (1883 – ??), Argentinean sculptor and mural painter
- Nena Jolidon Croake (1865–1934), American politician
- Nena Lekovic, Serbian songwriter
- Nena Kalu Ogba, birthname of Ogba Kalu Nnanna (born 1984), male Nigerian footballer

== Nickname ==
- Nena, stagename of Gabriele Susanne Kerner, (born 1960), German singer
- Nena (footballer, born 1923) (1923–2010), nickname of Olavo Rodrigues Barbosa, Brazilian footballer
- Nena Baltazar, nickname of Tania Baltazar Lugones, Bolivian environmentalist
- Nena Cardenas, born Remy Cardenas, Filipina actress
- Nena Peragallo, nickname of Nilda Peragallo Montano, professor of nursing
- Nena von Schlebrügge nickname of Birgitte Caroline von Schlebrügge, Mexican fashion model and mother of Uma Thurman

== Surname ==
- Jacob Nena (1941–2022), Micronesian politician

== Fictional characters ==
- Nena Bismaquer, a character in the John Gardner novel For Special Services
- Nena Trinity, a fictional character from Mobile Suit Gundam 00
- La Nena, one of the main characters of the 1987 Mexican sitcom television series ¡Ah qué Kiko!
- Nena, a fictional character from Jojo's Bizarre Adventure

== See also ==
- Nena (disambiguation)
- Nela (name)
- Neno (name)
- Nina (name)
- Extra Nena aka Snežana Berić, a Serbian singer known for Ljubim te pesmama
- Neneh Cherry, a Swedish singer-songwriter and rapper
- Dom La Nena, stage name of Dominique Pinto, (born 1989), Brazilian-born cellist, singer and songwriter
- Nena Daconte, Spanish pop group
- Nnena Kalu (born 1966), British-Nigerian artist
