= Nana (surname) =

Nana is a surname. Notable people with the surname include:

- Abrewa Nana (born 1980), Ghanaian singer, songwriter, dancer and former Idol series judge
- Antoinette Nana Djimou (born 1985), French-Cameroonian heptathlete
- Daniel Nana Yeboah (born 1978), Ghanaian football player
- Harding Nana (born 1981), Cameroonian basketball player
- Karl Te Nana (born 1975), New Zealand rugby player
- Kojo Nana Obiri-Yeboah, prominent Pentecostal pastor from Ghana active primarily in Uganda
- Lek Nana (c. 1924–2010), Thai businessman and politician
- Mizaistom Nana, a fictional character in the manga series Hunter × Hunter
- Parbhu Nana (1933–?), East African cricketer
- Prince Nana (born 1977), American professional wrestler of Ghanaian extraction
- Prince Nana (footballer) (born 1981), Danish-Ghanaian football player

== See also ==
- Nana (disambiguation)
- Nana (given name)
- Nina (name)
