= Jennifer Nehrbass =

Jennifer Nehrbass (born 1970) is an Albuquerque-based mixed media artist, with a focus on collage and painting.

Born in West Bend, Wisconsin, Neherbass received a BS in art and textile design from the University of Wisconsin, an MA in painting from New York University and an MFA from the University of New Mexico. Before committing to her art career, she worked at Ralph Lauren as a Design Director for a decade, which has influenced her practice. Her work lives in numerous private collections throughout the United States and Europe. Her work is included in the Elizabeth A. Sakler Center for Feminist Art: Feminist Art Base at the Brooklyn Museum.

Nehrbass is currently represented by Central Features Contemporary Art in Albuquerque, NM, Goodwin Fine Art in Denver, CO, and Brunnhofer Galerie in Linz, Austria.

Her work is in many private collections in the United States as well as Europe. Recently her work was included into the Elizabeth A. Sackler Center for Feminist Art :Feminist Art Base at the Brooklyn Museum.

Her art work functions somewhere between reality and fantasy, and is often referred to as surrealism. She makes collages, oil paintings and cameos, which are also oil on canvas but their distinct shape references the Victorian era. In addition to making collages, her figurative oil paintings emulate collage because the subjects appear to be cut from the surface. The independent, yet sensual, female figure is often the central focus in Nehrbass' work. Her Cameos are inspired by Margaret Atwood's book, The Penelopiad, and a Victorian obsession with sex and death.
