= Nuna (disambiguation) =

Nuna is a series of solar-powered vehicles.

Nuna may also refer to:

== Geography ==
- Nuna (supercontinent) or Columbia, one of Earth's oldest supercontinents
- Piz Nuna a mountain in the Sesvenna Range of the Alps
- Nuna, Poland, a village in Gmina Nasielsk, Nowy Dwór Mazowiecki, Masovian, Poland
- Nuna people, one of the Gurunsi peoples who live in southern Burkina Faso

== Other ==
- Nuña, a subspecies of common bean Phaseolus vulgaris
- "Núna" (Icelandic "Now"), a song, Icelandic entry in the Eurovision Song Contest 1995
- Nuna (month), the second month of the Mandaean calendar
- Nuna (Star Wars), fictional gamebirds in the Star Wars setting

== See also ==
- Nela (name)
- Nina (name)
