= Jessamyn Lovell =

American artist (born 1977)

Jessamyn Lovell (born 1977 in Syracuse, NY) is a visual artist who primarily uses photography, video, and performance. She has a BFA from Rochester Institute of Technology and an MFA from California College for the Arts. In 2007 Lovell won the first Aperture Portfolio Prize for her work entitled Catastrophe, Crisis, and Other Family Traditions. However, Lovell is most well known for her work entitled Dear Erin Hart, in which she found, followed, and photographed her identity thief, Erin Hart. More recently Lovell obtained her private investigator license, as part of her artwork entitled D.I.Y. P.I. (Do It Yourself Private Investigator).

Lovell resides in Albuquerque, New Mexico where she teaches at the University of New Mexico and is represented by Central Features Contemporary Art.

== Dear Erin Hart, ==
For her artwork Dear Erin Hart, Jessamyn Lovell found, followed, and photographed her identity thief Erin Hart. Lovell's wallet and phone were stolen, but in February 2011, when she was summoned to appear in court for a petty crime in which she was not involved, she learned her identity was also stolen. She tracked down Hart with the help of a private investigator, incorporating the photographs and experience into her art practice. Lovell speaks about not being sure if she wanted to confront Hart and, through the process of making art, begins to empathize with her. She eventually decided to not confront her but did send her a letter including an invitation to the exhibition, to which Hart never responded. The images that resulted reference surveillance photography and ask questions about the ethics of photography in a situation where the subject initially violated the privacy of the photographer.

Dear Erin Hart, has been exhibited at San Francisco Camerawork, Center for Contemporary Arts Santa Fe, CENTER, Central Features Contemporary Art, Colorado Photographic Arts Center, Carol Calo Gallery, and Sorenson Center for the Arts. A book of the work was published by SF Camerawork in 2015. Dear Erin Hart, has received international recognition and has been written about by numerous publications including Wired, Hyperallergic, SF Gate, Money Magazine, and many more. Dear Erin Hart, has also been featured on This American Life.
