= Nina Anisimova =

Nina Anisimova may refer to:

- Nina Anisimova (dancer) (1909–1979), Russian dancer and choreographer
- Nina Anisimova (triathlete) (born 1973), Russian Olympic triathlete
