= Nina Sedano =

German author

- Born: 1966 (age 59–60); Frankfurt, Germany
- Occupations: Author, travel enthusiast
- Writing career
- Language: German
- Years active: 2010s–present
- Genre: Travel literature
- Subjects: Travel, cultures, personal adventures
- Notable work: "Die Ländersammlerin"
- Website: www.nina-sedano.de

Nina Sedano is a German author. She visited a total of 197 countries by 2011, of which 193 were sovereign states. She wrote a book about her travels.

The book, entitled Die Ländersammlerin: Wie ich in der Ferne mein Zuhause fand. Die meistgereiste Frau Deutschlands erzählt ('The Country Collector: How I found my home far away. The most traveled woman in Germany tells us'), was a Spiegel bestseller in Germany. It was published in 2014 by Eden Books.

She followed with another book, Fernweh in Herzen: Die Ländersammlerin unterwegs zu neuen Abenteuern. Die meistgereiste Frau Deutschlands erzählt ('Wanderlust in the heart: The country collector on the way to new adventures. The most traveled woman in Germany tells us'), that was published in 2019 by Eden Books.

She stated her travel experiences in the book Chasing 193: The Quest to Visit Every Country in the World.

== See also ==
- Guinness World Records
- List of sovereign states
- Real-life Imitations of Around The World in Eighty Days
