= Nina Khrushcheva =

Nina Khrushcheva may refer to:

- Nina Petrovna Khrushcheva (Nina Kukharchuk; 1900–1984), wife of Soviet premier Nikita Khrushchev
- Nina L. Khrushcheva (born 1963), great-granddaughter of Nikita Khrushchev
