= Nina Güthner =

German writer

Nina Güthner (1835–1905, née von Fuchs-Bimbach) was a German writer.

She was born at Schloss Bimbach or Bimbach Castle near Prichsenstadt in the Kingdom of Bavaria. She wrote a play that was staged at what is today known as the National Theatre Munich, and contributed to literary magazines.
