= Nina J. Karnovsky =

American ecologist and ornithologist

Nina J. Karnovsky is an American ecologist and ornithologist. She is the Willard George Halstead Zoology Professor of Biology at Pomona College in Claremont, California.

== Early life and education ==
Karnovsky attended Wesleyan University. She loved the liberal arts and the philosophy of science offerings there but disliked science courses and petitioned out of her required ones. She ended up majoring in science and society. After college, she taught children at the Point Blue Bird Observatory, a field station at Point Reyes. She earned a master's degree at Montana State University, where she studied Antarctic birds, and a doctorate at the University of California, Irvine, where she studied Arctic birds.

== Career ==
Karnovsky sought to teach smaller classes where she could get to know her students better, and began teaching at Pomona College in 2004 as a terrestrial biologist. In 2022, she was a recipient of Pomona College's Wig Distinguished Professor awards.
