= Nina Babel =

German physician and scientist

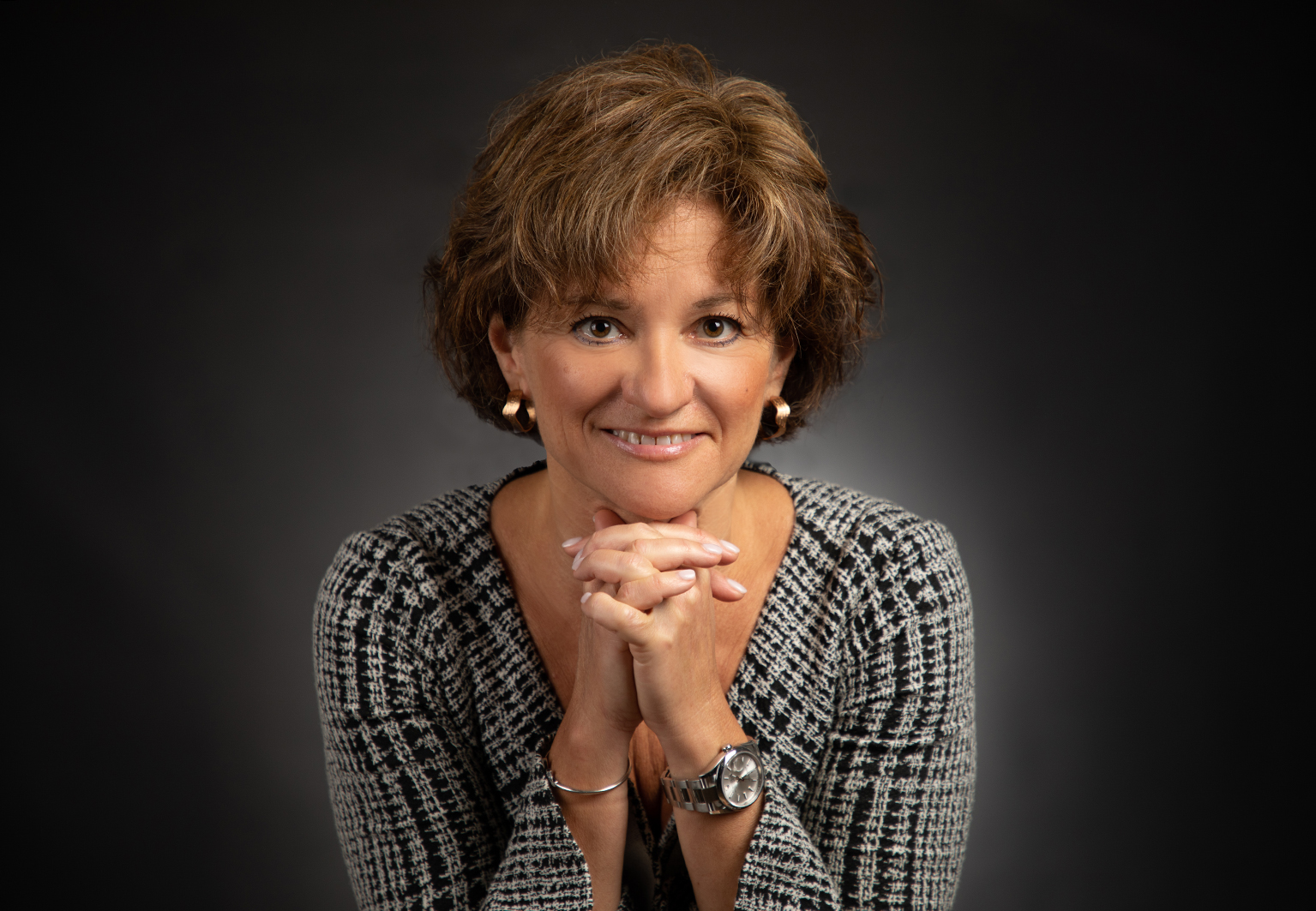
Nina Babel, 2023

Nina Babel is a German physician and scientist. As a professor at Ruhr University Bochum and Charité, she treats patients and performs research in the field of immunodeficiencies and kidney diseases.

== Life ==
Babel is the head of a research group focusing on immunology at the Charité. At Ruhr University Bochum, she heads the Center for Translational Medicine with a focus on immunology and transplantation at Marien Hospital Herne.

She studied medicine at Humboldt University of Berlin and completed her clinical training in the field of internal medicine, nephrology, and immunology at the Charité, where she also obtained her habilitation in 2008. As a Rahel Hirsch habilitation grant recipient, she carried out most of her habilitation work at the Charité and, from 2006 to 2007, as a fellow at the Taussig Cancer Center, Cleveland Clinic (Ohio).

== Research and patient care ==
Babel's laboratory investigates mechanisms underlying the immunopathogenesis of viral diseases and develops new parameters and technologies to monitor the individual immune response and the risk of viral infection and virus-associated complications in immunocompromised patients.

Babel has led several research projects focusing on the host's immune response to SARS-CoV-2. For instance, the researchers discovered that individuals who had a severe course of COVID-19 did not exhibit a diminished immune response in comparison to those who had a mild course of the disease. In another study, it was observed that the development of antibodies after vaccination was lower with immunosuppressants than without, while the cellular immune response was preserved. According to this, patients can benefit from the vaccination despite their immunosuppressive therapy. Babel continues to work on the topics of Sars-CoV-2 immunity, and in particular Long Covid and chronic fatigue. Furthermore, her research topic includes analysis of interaction between host's immune response and herpes viruses such as Epstein–Barr virus.

Babel has been coordinator and principal investigator of several DFG and BMBF projects. She has an h-index of 53, has been involved in over 300 scientific publications, and is editor-in-chief for the Immunosuppression section of the journal Frontiers of Transplantation.

== Young researchers support programs ==
Babel works on programs to support young researchers. After serving as co-spokesperson of the SFB 650 Research Training Group at Charité from 2012 to 2016, she continued her work at Ruhr University Bochum, where she leads the RIMUR Research Training Group. She also leads the Clinician Scientist Program at Ruhr University Bochum, for which she received funding from the DFG in summer 2022.

== Publications (selection) ==
- Seibert, Felix S.; Stervbo, Ulrik; Wiemers, Lea; Skrzypczyk, Sarah; Hogeweg, Maximillian; Bertram, Sebastian; Kurek, Julia; Anft, Moritz; Westhoff, Timm H.; Babel, Nina (November 2023). "Severity of neurological Long-COVID symptoms correlates with increased level of autoantibodies targeting vasoregulatory and autonomic nervous system receptors". Autoimmunity Reviews. 22 (11) 103445. doi:10.1016/j.autrev.2023.103445. ISSN 1873-0183. PMID 37689093.
- Anft, Moritz; Paniskaki, Krystallenia; Giglio, Tina; Wellenkötter, Jacqueline; Blazquez-Navarro, Arturo; Meister, Toni L; Roch, Toralf; Giesecke-Thiel, Claudia; Westhoff, Timm H; Stervbo, Ulrik; Pfaender, Stephanie; Cinkilic, Okan; Babel, Nina (January 2023). "SARS-CoV-2 vaccination improves HBV seroconversion rate through heterological immunity". Kidney International. 103 (103): 223–225. doi:10.1016/j.kint.2022.10.012. PMC 9624106. PMID 36332726.
- Hugo, Christian; Westhoff, Timm H.; Babel, Nina (2022). "Vaccination in patients with kidney failure: lessons from COVID-19". Nature Reviews Nephrology. 18 (11). Nature reviews / Nephrology: 708–723. doi:10.1038/s41581-022-00617-5. PMC 9397175. PMID 35999285.
- Stumpf, Julian; Siepmann, Torsten; Lindner, Tom; Karger, Claudia; Schwöbel, Jörg; Anders, Leona; Faulhaber-Walter, Robert; Schewe, Jens; Martin, Heike; Schirutschke, Holger; Barnett, Kerstin; Hüther, Jan; Müller, Petra; Langer, Torsten; Pluntke, Thilo; Anding-Rost, Kirsten; Meistring, Frank; Stehr, Thomas; Pietzonka, Annegret; Escher, Katja; Cerny, Simon; Rothe, Hansjörg; Pistrosch, Frank; Seidel, Harald; Paliege, Alexander; Beige, Joachim; Bast, Ingolf; Steglich, Anne; Gembardt, Florian; Kessel, Friederike; Kröger, Hannah; Arndt, Patrick; Sradnick, Jan; Frank, Kerstin; Klimova, Anna; Mauer, René; Grählert, Xina; Anft, Moritz; Blazquez-Navarro, Arturo; Westhoff, Timm H; Stervbo, Ulrik; Tonn, Torsten; Babel, Nina; Hugo, Christian (2021). "Humoral and cellular immunity to SARS-CoV-2 vaccination in renal transplant versus dialysis patients: A prospective, multicentral observational study using mRNA-1273 or BNT162b2 mRNA vaccine". The Lancet Regional Health - Europe. 9 100178. Lancet Regional Health Europe. doi:10.1016/j.lanepe.2021.100178. PMC 8299287. PMID 34318288.
- Thieme, Constantin J; Schulz, Malissa; Wehler, Patrizia; Anft, Moritz; Amini, Leila; Blàzquez-Navarro, Arturo; Stervbo, Ulrik; Hecht, Jochen; Nienen, Mikalai; Stittrich, Anna-Barbara; Choi, Mira; Zgoura, Panagiota; Viebahn, Richard; Schmueck-Henneresse, Michael; Reinke, Petra; Westhoff, Timm H; Roch, Toralf; Babel, Nina (December 2022). "In vitro and in vivo evidence that the switch from calcineurin to mTOR inhibitors may be a strategy for immunosuppression in Epstein-Barr virus-associated post-transplant lymphoproliferative disorder". Kidney International. 102 (6): 1392–1408. doi:10.1016/j.kint.2022.08.025. PMID 36103953.
- Thieme, Constantin J; Anft, Moritz; Paniskaki, Krystallenia; Blazquez-Navarro, Arturo; Doevelaar, Adrian; Seibert, Felix S; Hoelzer, Bodo; Konik, Margarethe Justine; Berger, Marc Moritz; Brenner, Thorsten; Tempfer, Clemens; Watzl, Carsten; Meister, Toni L; Pfaender, Stephanie; Steinmann, Eike; Dolff, Sebastian; Dittmer, Ulf; Westhoff, Timm H; Witzke, Oliver; Stervbo, Ulrik; Roch, Toralf; Babel, Nina (September 2022). "Robust T Cell Response Toward Spike, Membrane, and Nucleocapsid SARS-CoV-2 Protesins Is Not Associated with Recovery in Critical COVID-19 Patients". Cell Reports Medicine. 1 (6) 100092. Call Rep Med. doi:10.1016/j.xcrm.2020.100092. PMC 7456276. PMID 32904468.
- Anft, Moritz; Paniskaki, Krystalleni; Blazquez-Navarro, Arturo; Doevelaar, Adrian; Seibert, Felix S; Hölzer, Bodo; Skrzypczyk, Sarah; Kohut, Eva; Kurek, Julia; Zapka, Jan; Wehler, Patrizia; Kaliszczyk, Sviatlana; Bajda, Sharon; Thieme, Constantin J; Roch, Toralf; Konik, Margarethe Justine; Berger, Marc Moritz; Brenner, Thorsten; Kölsch, Uwe; Meister, Toni L; Pfaender, Stephanie; Steinmann, Eike; Tempfer, Clemens; Watzl, Carsten; Dolff, Sebastia; Dittmer, Ulf; Abou-El-Enein, Mohamed; Westhoff, Timm H; Witzke, Oliver; Stervbo, Ulrik; Babel, Nina (December 2022). "COVID-19-Induced ARDS Is Associated with Decreased Frequency of Activated Memory/Effector T Cells Expressing CD11a+". Molecular Therapy. 28 (12). Moleculary Theorie: 2691–2702. doi:10.1016/j.ymthe.2020.10.001. PMC 7543694. PMID 33186542.
- Bacher, Petra; Heinrich, Frederik; Stervbo, Ulrik; Nienen, Mikalai; Vahldieck, Marco; Iwert, Christina; Vogt, Katrin; Kollet, Jutta; Babel, Nina; Sawitzki, Birgit; Schwarz, Carsten; Bereswill, Stefan; Heimesaat, Markus M; Heine, Guido; Gadermaier, Gabriele; Asam, Claudia; Assenmacher, Mario; Kniemeyer, Olaf; Brakhage, Axel A; Ferreira, Fátima; Wallner, Michael; Worm, Margitta; Scheffold, Alexander (November 2016). "Regulatory T Cell specificity directs tolerance versus allergy against aeroantigens in humans". Cell. 167 (4): 1067–1078.e16. doi:10.1016/j.cell.2016.09.050. PMID 27773482.
- Bacher, Petra; Heinrich, Frederik; Stervbo, Ulrik; Nienen, Mikalai; Vahldieck, Marco; Iwert, Christina; Vogt, Katrin; Kollet, Jutta; Babel, Nina; Sawitzki, Birgit; Schwarz, Carsten; Bereswill, Stefan; Heimesaat, Markus M; Heine, Guido; Gadermaier, Gabriele; Asam, Claudia; Assenmacher, Mario; Kniemeyer, Olaf; Brakhage, Axel A; Ferreira, Fátima; Wallner, Michael; Worm, Margitta; Scheffold, Alexander (November 2016). "TCR repertoire analysis by next generation sequencing allows complex differential diagnosis of T cell-related pathology". Cell. 167 (4): 1067–1078.e16. doi:10.1016/j.cell.2016.09.050. PMID 27773482.
- Babel, Nina; Volk, Hans-Dieter; Reinke, Petra (May 2011). "BK polyomavirus infection and nephropathy: the virus-immune system interplay". Nature Reviews: Nephrology. 7 (7): 399–406. doi:10.1038/nrneph.2011.59. PMID 21610680.
