= Raychael Stine =

American painter and educator (born 1981)

- Born: April 19, 1981 (age 44); Chardon, Ohio
- Occupation: Artist

Raychael Stine (born April 19, 1981) is an American painter and educator. She has exhibited nationally and internationally, and is a professor at the University of New Mexico.

== Biography ==
Raychael Stine was born and spent her early years in Chardon, Ohio. Her family moved briefly to New Jersey before settling in north Texas, where she attended Flower Mound High School. She received her BFA in painting at the University of Texas at Dallas. She received an MFA at the University of Illinois Chicago. She lives in Albuquerque, New Mexico, where she is Assistant Professor in Painting & Drawing at the University of New Mexico.

== Subjects and themes ==
Stine is known for her use of dogs as a primary subject of her paintings. About this practice she states, "It's sort of illegal subject matter in the serious contemporary art world because it's really sentimental and soft, and it's not thought of as intellectual or conceptual. But figuring out how to relate to something or understand it physically and visually is like the entire process of a painting."

Stine was selected for New American Paintings Issues 132, 120 and 78 where she was awarded Juror’s Pick, the New Insight Exhibition at Art Chicago, and her work was exhibited in the Texas Biennial 2008.
