= Nina Morozhenko =

Ukrainian astronomer

- Born: Мороженко Ніна Миколаївна; 13 March 1928; Blagodarnensky District
- Died: 10 July 2009 (aged 81); Kyiv
- Education: Leningrad State University
- Scientific career
- Workplaces: Main Astronomical Observatory of Academy of Science of Ukraine
- Thesis: Spektropofotometricheskiye issledovaniya spokoynykh solnechnykh protuberantsev (1984)

Nina Mykolaivna Morozhenko (née Semenova; 13 March 1928, Blagodarne, RSFSR – 10 July 2009, Kyiv) was a Ukrainian astronomer, Doctor of physical and mathematical sciences. Her research considered heliophysics.

== Early life and education ==
Morozhenko studied physics at Saint Petersburg State University. She was a doctoral researcher at Herzen University. Her doctoral research considered the structure and state of calm solar protuberances.

== Research and career ==
After earning her doctorate Morozhenko moved to Kyiv, where she worked at the Main Astronomical Observatory of the National Academy of Sciences of Ukraine. She was made academic secretary in 1962. Morozhenko specialised in heliophysics, with a particular focus on protuberances. Protuberances represent the reddish gaseous substances that are ejected into the corona by the chromosphere. Protuberances can be calm or disruptive, and are very disruptive during solar eclipses. Calm protuberances, which last longer than eruptive ones, can persist for several months.

Morozhenko studied the heterogeneous structure of protuberances and attempted to understand their spectral features. She used transfer and variable source theories to construct a structurally inhomogeneous model of the solar protuberance. She explained the spectral shape of various protuberances by studying their density and fibrousness.

== Personal life ==
She was a member of the International Astronomical Union.

She died on 10 July 2009 in Kyiv.
