= Nina Fisheva =

Azerbaijani art administrator (1930–2010)

Nina Grigoryevna Fisheva (Azerbaijani: Nina Fişşeva; Russian: Нина Фищева; 24 September 1930, Baku – 29 August 2010, Baku) was the Head of the State Cinema and Photo Archives of Azerbaijan of the National Archive Department of Azerbaijan from 1958 to 2009.

The Photo Documents Department of the State October Revolution Archives was established in 1930. In 1943, it was transformed into the Central State Archives of Cinema and Photo Documents of Azerbaijan.

The Archives have more than 22,000 films and more than 400,000 photo documents depicting the most important political and cultural events in the history of Azerbaijan, the oldest of which date back to 1858.

The documents that the Archives own today have come in different ways. Some were brought by Fisheva from her trips to Moscow, Tashkent, Tbilisi, Minsk, and other cities of the Former Soviet Union; some were contributed by various organizations and institutions. The Internet is a new means of replenishing the stock thanks to which the Archives have found many remarkable old photographs, such as color photographs of Old Baku.

Collections of unique photographs donated by Julia Germanovich are among the special possessions of the Archives. These photographs show Baku as it was at the beginning of the 20th century, with its bazaars, tea-houses, and schools.

In 1981, Nina Fisheva received the Honorary Culture Worker of Azerbaijan award. She has also received two diplomas from the Supreme Council of Azerbaijan. Fisheva was a member of the Azerbaijan Cinematographers' Union.
