= Nina Shea =

American lawyer (born 1953)

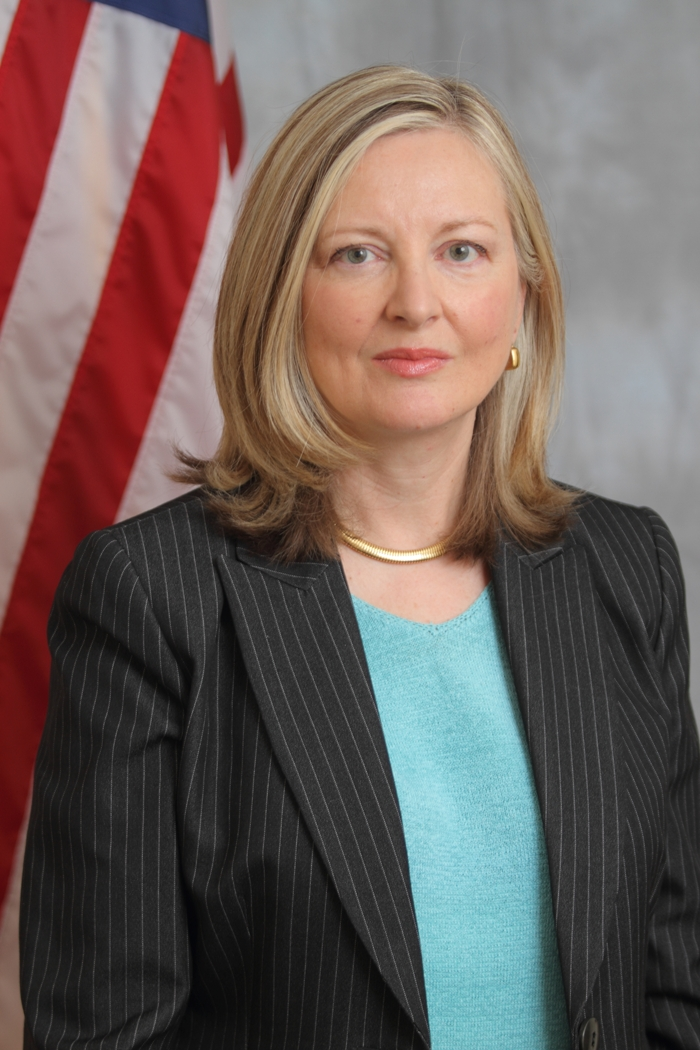

Commissioner of the United States Commission on International Religious Freedom
- In office June 1999 – March 2012; Vice Chair: 2003–2007
- Appointed by: Dennis Hastert; John Boehner
- President: Bill Clinton; George W. Bush; Barack Obama

Personal details
- Born: Nina Hope Shea; August 17, 1953 (age 72)
- Party: Republican
- Spouse: Adam Meyerson
- Education: Smith College; American University (JD)

Nina Hope Shea (born August 17, 1953) is an American international human rights lawyer and international Christian religious freedom advocate.

== Early life ==
A native of Pennsylvania, Shea graduated cum laude from Smith College, and graduated from the Washington College of Law of American University. Shea is Catholic.

Shea is married to Adam Meyerson, president of The Philanthropy Roundtable. They have three sons.

== Career ==
She is a former director of the Center for Religious Freedom at Freedom House, an office which she had helped found in 1986 as the Puebla Institute. She served as a Commissioner on the United States Commission on International Religious Freedom from 1999 to 2012. She has been a Senior Fellow at Hudson Institute since November 2006, and directs the Center for Religious Freedom there. In January 2009, she was appointed as a commissioner on the U.S. National Commission to UNESCO.

She was appointed as a U.S. delegate to the United Nations' Commission on Human Rights.

Shea authored In the Lion's Den (1997) on anti-Christian discrimination. Shea is also the co-author of Silenced: How Apostasy & Blasphemy Codes are Choking Freedom Worldwide (2011).
