= Nina May Owens =

Canadian teacher and painter

- Born: Nina May Pickel; June 16, 1869; Bolton Centre, Quebec, Canada
- Died: June 28, 1959 (aged 90); Montreal, Quebec, Canada
- Known for: Painter
- Spouse: Owen Ernest Owens (m. 1891–1910)

Nina May Owens (June 16, 1869 – 28 June 1959) was a Canadian teacher and painter. She challenged Victorian norms by continuing to paint after she married.

== Biography ==
Nina May Pickel, was born in Bolton Centre, Quebec, on June 16, 1869. She trained to become a teacher at Waterloo Academy. In 1889 she went on to work as a practice teacher Danville, Quebec. She transferred to Montebello in 1890 to continue her work as a practice teacher.

That same year she met Owen Ernest Owens, whom she married in 1891. They had two children before Owens' death from pneumonia in 1910.

Nina was financially able to stop teaching and continue painting. She attended the Art Association of Montreal from 1909 to 1920. Among her classmates were artists from the Beaver Hall Group. In 1918 Owens exhibited at the Royal Canadian Academy of Arts exhibition and she exhibited regularly at Art Association of Montreal from 1910 to 1927. She attended Alfred Laliberté's Modelling Class at the École des beaux-arts de Montréal winning 3rd prize in his Advanced Class.

Owens traveled to Europe in 1925 and in 1936 to 1937 she spent 11 months in Great Britain sketching and painting the countryside.

Owens died in Montreal on 28 June 1959.

The Musée des Beaux-Arts de Sherbrooke held a retrospective exhibition of her works in 1992.
