= Nina Marković-Khaze =

Australian political scientist and journalist

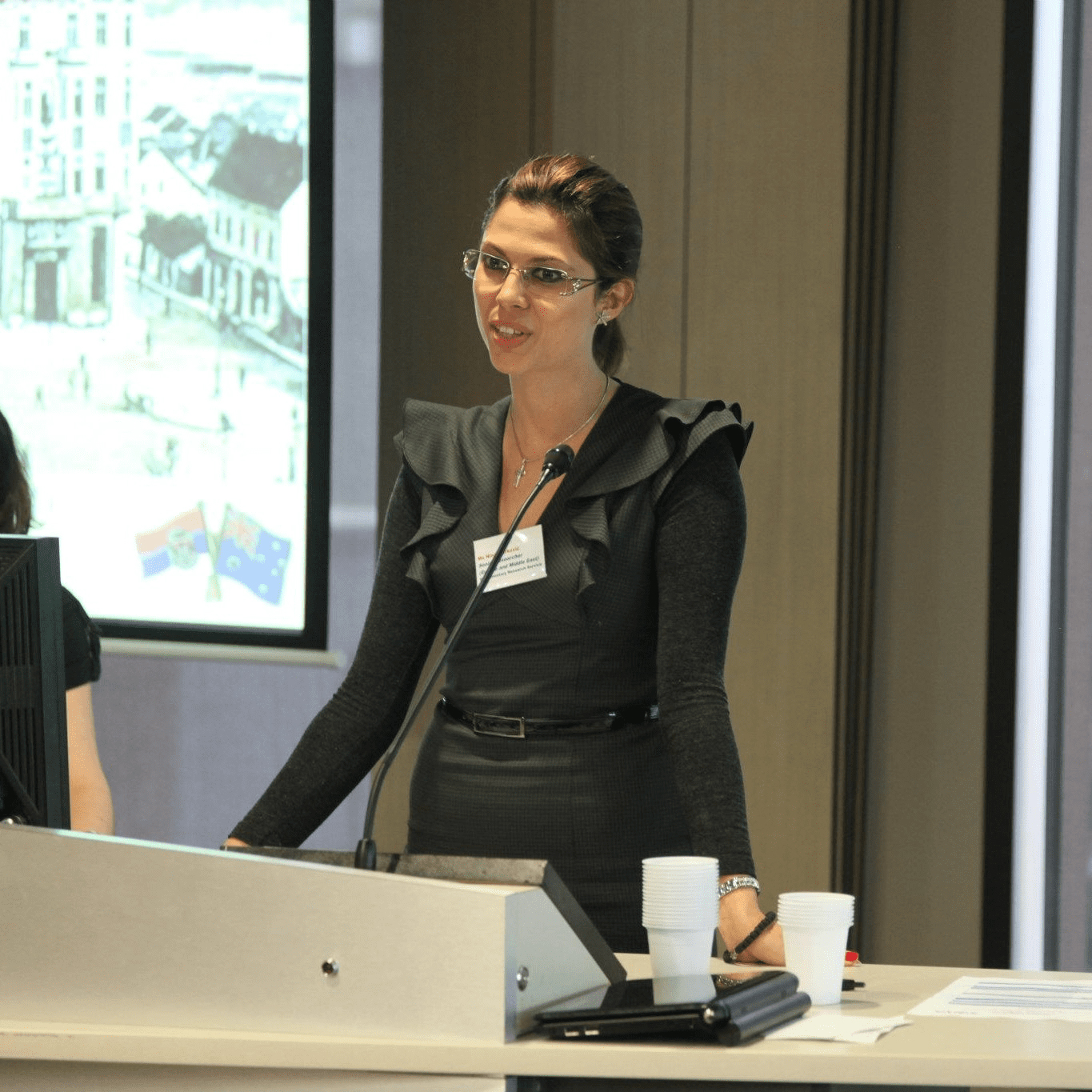
- Born: July 20, 1983; Belgrade, Serbia
- Education: Australian National University
- Scientific career
- Fields: Political Science
- Workplaces: Macquarie University

Nina Marković-Khaze (Serbian: Нина Марковић Казе, Nina Marković Kaze, born July 20, 1983) is an Australian political scientist and journalist.

== Education and career ==
Nina Marković Khaze was born in Belgrade, Serbia, where she grew up and received her primary education. She has lived in Australia since 1999, graduated from the University of Western Australia, and undertook her master's studies in Diplomatic Studies and Italian language at the Australian National University. She got her PhD in Political Science with a thesis on the Historical Cross-Section of Diplomatic Relations Between Serbia and the European Union.

Marković Khaze was a Senior Research Fellow for Europe and the Middle East in the Parliament of Australia, Parliamentary Delegate for the Pacific States, and president of the European Studies Association of Australia and New Zealand. She is a lecturer at the Department of Security Studies and Criminology at Macquarie University in Sydney and a journalist of the Serbian-language program of SBS Radio.

She is one of the founders and a member of the board of directors of the Serbian Council of Australia (SCOFA), a political association of Serbian Australians, a member of the executive committee of the Australasian Association for Communist and Post-Communist Studies, and a member of AusBiotech, a biotech association.

Also, she is Editor-in-Chief of Allergies, Immunity & Microbiome News, a journal of Immunity Group Australia, a company she co-founded with American allergist and immunologist Douglas Jones.

== Publications ==
=== Books ===
- The Immune Fitness Project – Food Allergy Resilience (Immunity Group Australia, 2023), with Douglas Jones
- Australian Migration Files (Impressions Publishing, 2025), with Adam Khaze

=== Selected articles ===
- The Role of Pro-Reform Civil Society in Serbia's Accession to the EU: Oppositional Discourses, Watchdog Role, and EU Advocacy, "Australian and New Zealand Journal of European Studies," No. 10 (3), pp. 24–48 (European Studies Association of Australia and New Zealand, 2018)
- "European Diplomacy in Crisis Lessons" – From the Congress of Berlin of 1878," Reform, Revolution, and Crisis in Europe – Landmarks in History, Memory and Thought (Routledge, 2019)
- "Fleeing Communism – Yugoslav and Vietnamese Post-War Migration to Australia and Changes to Immigration Policy," 30 Years Since the Fall of the Berlin Wall, pp. 405–425 (Springer Singapore, 2020), with Adam Khaze
- The EU's Stability-Democracy Dilemma in the Context of the Problematic Accession of the Western Balkan States, "Journal of Contemporary European Studies," No. 29 (2), pp. 169–183 (Routledge, 2021), with Nicholas Ross Smith and Maja Kovačević
- Is China's Rising Influence in the Western Balkans a Threat to European Integration? "Journal of Contemporary European Studies," No. 29 (2), pp. 234–250 (Routledge, 2021), with Xiwen Wang
- Perceptions of the EU in the Western Balkans Vis-à-Vis Russia and China, "European Foreign Affairs Review," No. 27 (1), pp. 81–108 (Wolters Kluwer, 2022)
