= Nina Saxon =

American graphic designer (born 1953)

Nina Saxon (born 1953) is an American graphic designer, film titles designer, and founder of Nina Saxon Film Design.

== Early life and education ==
Nina Saxon was born in Minneapolis, Minnesota, and grew up in the California San Fernando Valley. She attended the University of California, Los Angeles where she began studying psychology with aspirations of becoming a psychologist, but was drawn to animation after taking a course as an elective. As a student, her first short film depicted a childbirth shot on location at a Planned Parenthood intercut to music. The film helped her to win the Jim Morrison Film Award, a scholarship presented to UCLA films students that exhibit professional promise, and demonstrate artistic talent in film and television directing and producing. She completed a BA in animation with a minor in Psychology.

== Early career ==
Saxon's first job was a six-week project in Mill Valley with academy award-winning director John Korty. It was on this production that she met her mentor, editor Donn Cambern. Utilizing his connections, Cambern assisted Saxon in obtaining a visual effects position with the optical house Modern Film Effects for the fist Star Wars film. It was on this production that Saxon learned about rotoscoping. She used this technique to create the red laser bullets and blaster bolt effect for the three Star Wars films. According to Adam Beckett, Saxon was responsible for the shooting and animating these shots.

After Star Wars, Saxon took a position with Robert Abel and Associates, a visual effects company responsible for innovative effects seen in films such as The Andromeda Strain (film)(1971) and Tron (1982). Here she expanded her technical skills and learned how to paint with light. Light painting is a photographic technique in which the movement of a light source during a long exposure photograph produces a drawn visual record of the movement exposed onto one image.

== Career ==
As one of a dozen designers specializing in movie title design in the mid-1990s, she was considered one of the most sought after according to Benenson of the New York Times.

=== New Wave ===
In 1998 Saxon was hired by New Wave Entertainment as VP and creative director of their design group. New Wave is known as a movie marketing company that developed movie trailers, TV spots, and print ads for studios such as Paramount Pictures, Walt Disney Co., and Columbia Tristar Pictures. The addition of Saxon allowed New Wave to offer title design services to their clients.

== Influence ==
=== Logo period of film title design ===
Saxon's title designs, as well as those created by other designers of the time, represented a shift in aesthetic and philosophy of the form. During the 1970s, Hollywood faced challenges with a new rating system and increased competition from independent production companies. These challenges resulted in a shift in title design from one that was lengthy and set apart from the rest of the film to one focused on brand development, the "logo title". During this time, studios preferred titling that branded the film with a "logo opening" and could be repurposed in printed design. This style of titling set the "logo-title" apart from the rest of the credits which were placed over the opening sequence of the film.

== Selected film and television title design ==
- Oh Heavenly Dog (1980)
- Paternity (1981)
- Going Berserk (1983)
- Romancing the Stone (1984)
- Back to the Future (1985)
- The Jewel of the Nile (1985)
- Gung Ho (1986)
- Triplecross (1986)
- About Last Night (1986)
- Soul Man (1986)
- Babes in Toyland (1986)
- The Accused (1988)
- Teenage Mutant Ninja Turtles II: The Secret of the Ooze (1991)
- Life Stinks (1991)
- Rambling Rose (1991)
- Beauty and the Beast (1991)
- Folks! (1991)
- Gunmen (1993)
- The Fugitive (1993)
- The Secret Garden (1993)
- True Romance (1993)
- Mrs. Doubtfire (1993)
- Wrestling Ernest Hemingway (1993)
- Forrest Gump (1994)
- It Could Happen to You (1994)
- Timecop (1994)
- Something to Talk About (1995)
- Get Shorty (1995)
- It Takes Two (1995)
- Mr. Holland's Opus (1995)
- Eye for an Eye (1996)
- Heaven's Prisoners (1996)
- The Craft (1996)
- The Phantom (1996)
- Striptease (1996)
- The Frighteners (1996)
- Escape from L.A. (1996)
- The Glimmer Man (1996)
- High School High (1996)
- Jungle 2 Jungle (1997)
- Contact (1997)
- Good Burger (1997)
- Under Wraps (1997)
- Glory & Honor (1998)
- Primary Colors (1998)
- Goodbye Lover (1998)
- Six Days Seven Nights (1998)
- Halloween H20: 20 Years Later (1998)
- Simon Birch (1998)
- Rush Hour (1998)
- Holy Man (1998)
- Practical Magic (1998)
- I Still Know What You Did Last Summer (1998)
- Stepmom (1998)
- At First Sight (1999)
- The Corruptor (1999)
- 200 Cigarettes (1999)
- Baby Geniuses (1999)
- Life (1999)
- Dick (1999)
- Molly (1999)
- Bowfinger (1999)
- The Cider House Rules (1999)
- Jakob the Liar (1999)
- A Slight Case of Murder (1999)
- The Bachelor (1999)
- "Mission to Mars" (2000)
- Rules of Engagement (2000)
- Return to Me (2000)
- Big Momma's House (2000)
- Running Mates (2000)
- Duets (2000)
- The Contender (2000)
- Bette (2000)
- Chocolat (2000)
- Antitrust (2001)
- The Wedding Planner (2001)
- "Valentine" (2001)
- Heartbreakers (2001)
- 61* (2001)
- The Princess Diaries (2001)
- Evolution (2001)
- Collateral Damage (2002)
- Eye See You (2002)
- 40 Days and 40 Nights (2002)
- Big Trouble (2002)
- High Crimes (2002)
- The Adventures of Pluto Nash (2002)
- Life with Bonnie (2002)
- People I Know (2002)
- High Crimes (2002)
- Below (2002)
- Holes (2003)
- The Fighting Temptations (2003)
- Against the Ropes (2003)
- Something the Lord Made (2003)
- Eulogy (2003)
- Be Cool (2003)
- "Beauty Shop" (2005)
- Daltry Calhoun (2005)
- Big Momma's House (2006)
- 10th and Wolf (2006)
- RV (2006)
- Snakes on a Plane (2006)
- The Departed (2006)
- Man of the Year (2006)
- The Hoax (2006)
- Deck the Halls (2006)
- Notes from the Underbelly (2007)
- Perfect Stranger (2007)
- Rendition (2007)
- The Jane Austen Book Club (2007)
- Sydney White (2007)
- Notes from the Underbelly (2007)
- Anamorph (2007)
- The Yellow Handkerchief (2008)
- What Just Happened (2008)
- The Accidental Husband (2008)
- Soul Men (2008)
- Ace Ventura Jr.: Pet Detective (2009)
- Fighting (2009)
- Did You Hear About the Morgans? (2009)
- Ace Ventura Jr.: Pet Detective (2009)
- Dear John (2010)
- Salt (2010)
- The Rum Diary (2011)
- Make Your Move (2013)
