= Nina Bradlin =

Singer and stage actress

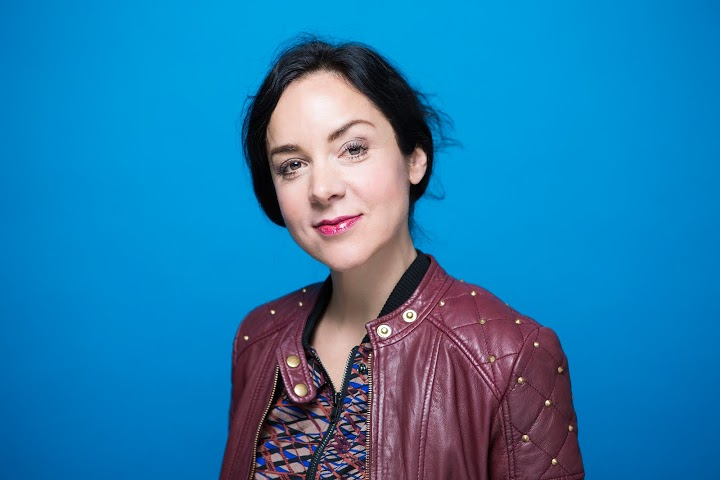
Nina Bradlin

Nina Bradlin is a singer of smooth jazz, as well as a stage actor. Born in Detroit, Michigan, she currently lives and performs in Basel, Switzerland.

== Biography and career ==
Bradlin studied drama and comparative literature. and started her musical career in the early 2000s.

In 2013, Nina Bradlin released her album, Right Where You Are, recorded in Basel, Dublin, and Detroit. In 2015, she released album "Stardust", and in 2020 her latest album "Home Again".

Nina Bradlin appeared as Blanche du Bois in A Streetcar Named Desire directed by Krista Jaquet and performed in Basel, Switzerland and in Helsinki, Finland. She can be seen in short films such as "The Vault" and in the upcoming independent feature film "Oboleo". Before moving to Europe, Nina Bradlin directed the world premiere of an original musical called "Contemporary Furnishings" starring future Tony Award nominees Hunter Foster and Jennifer Laura Thompson. In addition to her music career, she currently teaches acting and works on theater projects in Switzerland.

Discography

- Sela's Song (2010)
- Right Where You Are (2013)
- Stardust (2015)
- Home Again (2020)
