= Nina Berova-Orahovac =

Bessarabian-Bulgarian physician

- Нимфодора "Нина" Берова-Ораховац
- Berova-Orahovac
- Born: Nymphodora "Nina" Berova; 27 November 1859; Kubei, Bessarabia Governorate, Russian Empire
- Died: 23 May 1945 (aged 85); Sofia, Kingdom of Bulgaria
- Other name: Nina Berova-Orahovats
- Education: Imperial Military Medical Academy
- Occupation: physician
- Years active: 1885–1945
- Spouse: Petar Orahovac
- Children: Dimitar Orahovac
- Father: Sava Berov

Nymfodora "Nina" Berova-Orahovac (Bulgarian: Нимфодора "Нина" Берова-Ораховац; 27 November 1859 – 23 May 1945) was a Bessarabian-Bulgarian woman who was a co-founder of the School Health Institute and the student summer camp in Pancharevo. She was raised in the Bulgarian communities of Kubei and Bolhrad in what is now Ukraine. After graduating as a physician from the Medical Academy of Saint Petersburg in Russia, she became the second Bessarabian physician to work in Bulgaria. She completed her residency at the Aleksandrovska Hospital in Sofia, serving as a medic during the Serbo-Bulgarian War. Later she worked in the hospitals in Vidin, Lovech and Koprivshtitsa, before returning to Sofia. Along with Velichko Georgiev, she founded the Bulgarian School Health Institute, to train professionals in hygiene and health to work as school doctors. In 1905, she was one of the founders of the women's association which established summer camps to educate and promote good health for students. She worked as a school nurse until 1915, and remained active in the Bulgarian Medical Association until her death.

== Early life and education ==
Nymphodora "Nina" Berova was born on 27 November 1859 in the village of Kubei in the Bessarabia Governorate of the Russian Empire to Yulia and Sava Berov. Her father, who had been born in Kayraklia, Bessarabia was the priest in Kubei. Later he served at the Transfiguration Cathedral in Bolhrad, was one of the leaders of the Bulgarian immigrant community, and was involved in the founding of the Bolhrad High School. She graduated from the Medical Academy of Saint Petersburg, Russia in 1885. She was the second Bessarabian woman of Bulgarian heritage to become a physician in Bulgaria, after Anastasia Golovina, who earned her credentials in Switzerland in the 1870s.

== Career ==
After completing her studies, Berova moved to Bulgaria and began her residency in 1885 at the Aleksandrovska Hospital in Sofia. She worked as a medic during the Serbo-Bulgarian War, performing surgical procedures in Sofia. Later she worked in the hospitals in Vidin, Lovech and Koprivshtitsa, before returning to Sofia. She was chief of the surgical department of the Vidin Hospital from 1886 to 1890. Then, she served as a senior doctor in Lovech, and in both Koprivshtitsa and Sofia, she served as a specialist in internal diseases. Berova married the Montenegrin physician Petar Orahovac, whose family were also Bulgarian emigrants during Ottoman rule. A year after acquiring his medical credentials in Moscow in 1883, Orohovac moved to Bulgaria. In 1892, their son Dimitar was born. He would become an internationally-known physician and academic.

In 1904, along with Velichko Georgiev, Berova-Orahovac organized the Bulgarian School Health Institute, with the purpose of training professionals in hygiene and health to work as school doctors. At the time, she worked as a school doctor at Kindergarten No. 1 in Sophia, and would continue there until 1915. Many women physicians worked as school doctors after 1904 because of the negative attitude toward women physicians. The competition for posts caused many male doctors and the media to stereotype women in the profession as lacking skills and scientific training and both the physical and mental strength for the job. Working with doctors, such as Ana Selakovich-Ivanova and Desha Kazasova-Gencheva, and other women in 1905, Berova-Orahovac founded the Женско Дружество За Летни Ученически Колонии "Здравец" (Women's Association for the "Health" Summer Student Colony). The idea behind the summer school camp was to provide opportunities for children to participate in healthy environments and strengthen their bodies as well as their minds. The first camp was opened in the village of Pancharevo and was under the supervision of a doctor and a teacher. The facility provided sleeping quarters with a kitchen and dining room to prepare healthy meals for the students. Berova-Orahovac was one of the primary activists in the summer camp movement. She retired as a school hygienist in 1919, but remained active in the Bulgarian Medical Association, of which her husband had been a founder.

== Death and legacy ==
Berova-Orahovac died on 23 May 1945, in Sofia. She has been remembered for her promotion of public health and preventive medicine, as well as her activism in driving training for school doctors and summer camps for children. The summer camp at Pancharevo continued to operate until 1950; however, its properties were taken over by the state when communist rule was implemented in Bulgaria.
