= Russian Organization for Intellectual Property =

Russian performance rights organization

Russian Organization for Intellectual Property VOIS
- Всероссийская организация интеллектуальной собственности ВОИС
- Abbreviation: VOIS
- Formation: 2008
- Headquarters: Moscow
- Location: Russia
- Official language: russian
- General Director: Andrey Krichevsky
- Website: http://rosvois.ru/

The Russian Organization for Intellectual Property VOIS (Russian: Всероссийская организация интеллектуальной собственности, ВОИС) is the collective management society for neighboring rights of Russian performers and labels, established in 2008.

In 2009 Rosohrankultura (the Ministry of Culture Department) accredited VOIS as the sole society to collect and distribute remuneration for related rights owners within the territory of the Russian Federation.

In everyday activity VOIS concludes contracts with music users both in public sphere and broadcasting.

The main goals of VOIS are:

1. To collect the remuneration
2. To distribute the remuneration between Russian and foreign right-holders (according with bilateral agreements with foreign collective societies)
3. To represent Russian related rightholders abroad

Total amount of collected remuneration in 2012 reached about 531,7 mln. Rub.

== See also ==
- Collective rights management
- Related rights
- Association of European Performers' Organisations
