= Nina Weiss =

American artist

Nina Weiss Nina Weiss
- Occupation: Artist

Academic background
- Education: University of Wisconsin–Madison; Temple University

Academic work
- Discipline: Art
- Institutions: School of the Art Institute of Chicago; Columbia College Chicago
- Website: ninaweiss.com

Nina Weiss is a Chicago-area fine artist and teacher.

Weiss taught at the School of the Art Institute of Chicago and Columbia College Chicago for 18 years. Weiss has taught painting, drawing and color classes & workshops in the Chicago area and around the USA. She takes students to Europe every summer to teach her European Landscape Painting and Drawing workshops. Her work has appeared in The Chicago Art Scene. Artists Home & Studios and One Hundred Artists of the Midwest by E. Ashley Rooney. Her work has appeared in two Hollywood films and the television series "Chicago Fire". Exhibitions include New York Art Expo, Peggy Notebaert Nature Museum, J. Petter Galleries, Koehline Art Museum, Union League Club and more.

Weiss has taught educational painting and drawing videos for the Prismacolor company and the online video company CRAFTSY including STARTUP ACRYLIC PAINTING and WATER-BASED MEDIA.

Weiss received a Bachelor of Fine Arts in Painting from the Tyler School of Art, Temple University in Philadelphia. She attended graduate school at the University of Wisconsin–Madison starting in 1980.
