= Nina Elder =

American artist

Nina Elder (born April 9, 1981) is an American transdisciplinary artist, writer, muralist, and educator. Her practice is informed by science, field research, and social justice movements. Elder's research based processes result in realistic drawings, performative lectures, and video work. Her writing and teaching hybridize art and science to connect nature and culture. She travels extensively, participating in scientific research and lecturing at universities. She has exhibited nationally and internationally.

== Biography ==
Nina Elder was born and spent her childhood in Colorado Springs, Colorado. She attended Palmer High School, where she studied with art teacher and activist Floyd Tunson. She received a BFA in studio art from the University of New Mexico. She received an MFA at the San Francisco Art Institute, where she studied critical economic theory. She is faculty at the University of Nevada, Reno and affiliated with the University of Oregon and Colorado College. She now lives off-the-grid in Datil, New Mexico.

== Subjects and themes ==
Elder is known for her detailed drawings of geologic processes, including pit mines, nuclear test sites, and glacial debris. She often collaborates with scientists and academic institutions as part of her creative process. She uses non-traditional drawing materials that she collects from the landscape, including radioactive charcoal, wildfire charcoal, and pulverized rocks. Major themes in her work include glacial erratics, mining, deep time, forest fire ecology, and geology.

== Awards, exhibitions, and publications ==
In 2022, Elder was named one of 12 Artists to Know Now by Southwest Contemporary. She received the Pollock-Krasner Award in 2017 and was featured in New American Paintings. She was the 2020 commencement speaker for the Minneapolis College of Art and Design. She has participated in residencies at the Tamarind Institute, the Ucross Foundation, the Ellis Beauregard Foundation, the Sitka Center for Art and Ecology, among others.

Elder has had solo exhibitions and major installations at the University of New Hampshire Museum of Art, Southern Utah Museum of Art, the Anchorage Museum, SITE Santa Fe, Central Features Contemporary Art, and the Albuquerque Museum.

Elder's work has been featured in Hyperallergic, Art in America, Vice, Southwest Contemporary, and on PBS. Her writing has been published in Edge Effects Journal, American Scientist, and various exhibition catalogs and research publications. Elder has held awarded research positions including Art + Environment Research Fellow at the Nevada Museum of Art, a Polar Lab Research Fellow at the Anchorage Museum, and a Researcher in Residence in the Art and Ecology Program at the University of New Mexico.
