= Nina Spreitzer =

Slovenian handball player

Personal information
- Nationality: Slovenian
- Born: 4 March 1998 (age 28) Ljubljana, Slovenia
- Height: 1.78 m (5 ft 10 in)

Sport
- Sport: Handball
- Position: Centre back
- Current club: RK Krim
- Number: 9
National team
Years	Team	Apps	(Gls)
–	Slovenia	75	(40)

Nina Spreitzer (born Žabjek, 4 March 1998) is a Slovenian handball player for RK Krim and the Slovenian national team.

She was selected to represent Slovenia at the 2017 World Women's Handball Championship.

She has played her entire career for RK Krim, where she has won the Slovenian Championship every season between 2017 and 2024.
