= Nina Dudnik =

American social entrepreneur, science diplomacy advocate

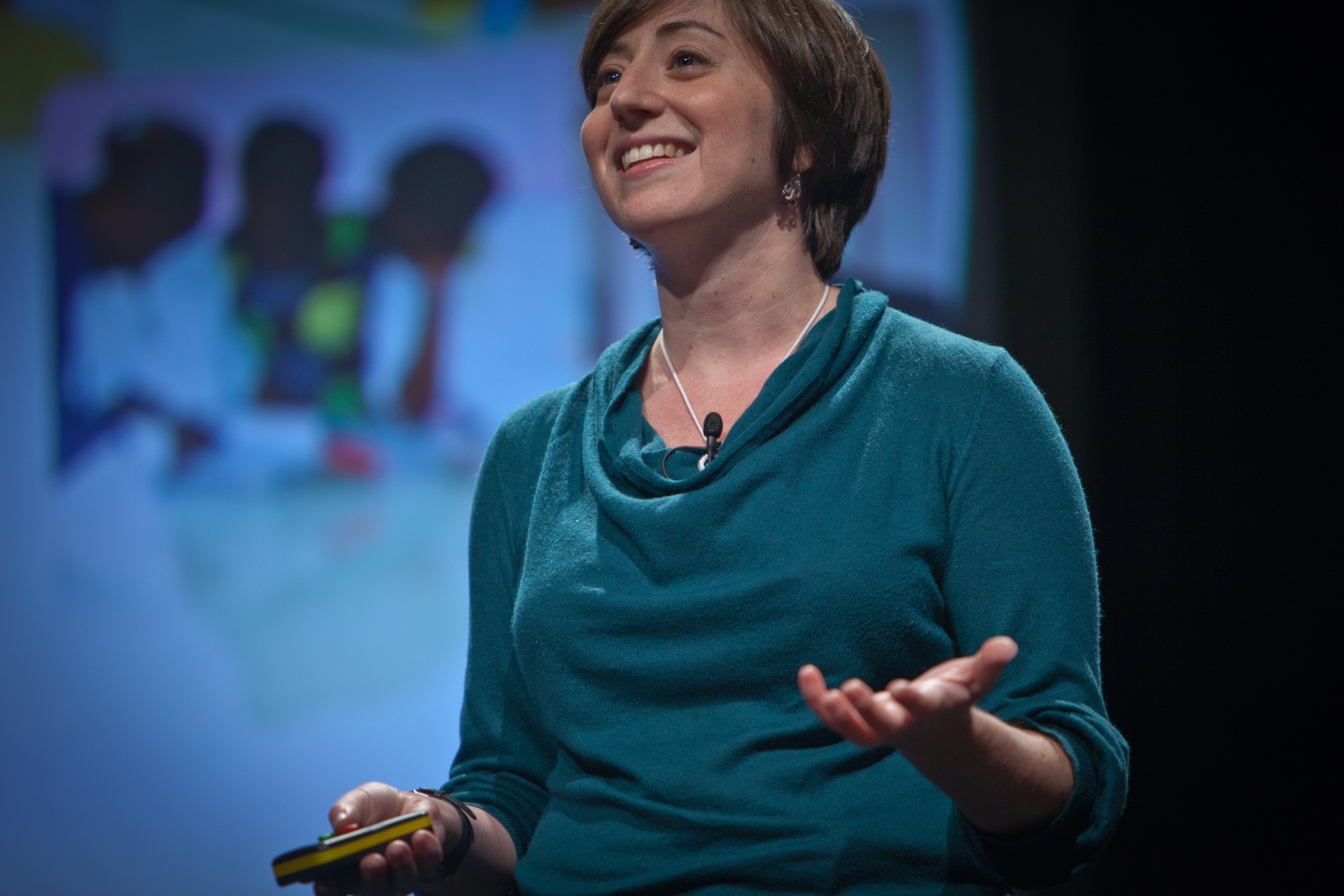
- Education: Harvard University Brown University
- Occupations: Director of Policy, MilliporeSIgma
- Known for: Global development, science diplomacy, social entrepreneurship
- Awards: John F. Kennedy New Frontier Award, TEDGlobal Fellow, Boston Business Journal Innovation All Star

Nina Dudnik is an American social entrepreneur, science diplomacy advocate, and the Founder and former CEO of Seeding Labs, a US-based nonprofit organization investing in building scientific capacity in the developing world. Dudnik founded the organization in 2003 as a graduate student studying at Harvard University, where she received her PhD in molecular biology.

== Education and early career ==
Dudnik received her Bachelor of Science in biochemistry from Brown University. Between college and graduate school, she worked in agricultural development as a consultant for CGIAR (Consultative Group for International Agricultural Research) in Italy, and then became a Fulbright scholar in Côte d'Ivoire. After her year in Africa, she returned to the United States to attend Harvard University, where she received her PhD in molecular biology. She did her doctoral work in the laboratory of Dr. Kami Ahmad, where she ultimately published her dissertation, "Histone dimers on the move: Nucleosome assembly systems for H2A and H2AV in Drosophila."

== Global development work ==
Dudnik had personally felt the effects of lack of access to scientific resources in developing countries when doing her Fulbright work in Côte d'Ivoire, where she was working to breed better varieties of rice. There, she saw a gap between a wealth of scientific talent and a dearth of access to research equipment to put that talent to use. When she returned to the United States to pursue her doctoral degree, she worked to bridge that gap. She led a group of fellow students in collecting surplus biological equipment and supplies at Harvard University to send to labs in developing countries to support the research they were doing at their local institutions. This effort became the basis of Seeding Labs, which formally launched in 2007 when Dudnik was awarded the Echoing Green fellowship. A year later, Seeding Labs was established as a 501(c)3 nonprofit organization in 2008.

Dudnik and her team expanded Seeding Labs beyond equipment transfer, developing exchange programs to train scientists from developing countries in America. She promoted the organization's vision as a TEDGlobal Fellow, a PopTech Social Innovation Fellow, and at the World Economic Forum. They have received funding and support from a combination of government organizations like the United States Agency for International Development, academic institutions like Harvard University, and multinational corporations like Merck.

== Science advocacy efforts ==
Dudnik has written about the need to build scientific capacity in developing countries to take on the world's most pressing health challenges for outlets like Scientific American, Time, and Quartz, drawing attention to the lack of funding and research support for countries in the global South. After the 2014 Ebola outbreak in West Africa, she published an op-ed for the Wall Street Journal underscoring the need to support developing scientific talent within Africa, which could have enabled earlier public health mobilization on the ground and prevented a wider Ebola outbreak without reliance on Western aid.

A woman in science herself, Dudnik has also written about issues of diversity, equity, and inclusion in STEM fields. She is currently an Advisory Board member for the grassroots nonprofit 500 Women Scientists, which is working to make science open, inclusive, and accessible by promoting women scientists in leadership.

== Awards and honors ==
- Echoing Green Global Fellow, 2007
- TEDGlobal Fellow, 2010
- PopTech Social Innovation Fellow, 2010
- Elle's Inspirational Women, The Fixers, 2011
- John F. Kennedy New Frontier Award, 2014
- Scientific American's 100 Most Influential People in Biotechnology, 2015
- New England Biolabs Passion in Science Humanitarian Duty Award, 2016
- Boston Business Journal Innovation All Star, 2017
