= Nina Kirso =

Soviet and Ukrainian singer (1963–2020)

Background information
- Born: August 4, 1963; Poltava, Ukrainian SSR, USSR, (now Ukraine)
- Died: April 30, 2020 (aged 56) Poltava, Ukraine
- Genres: pop
- Occupations: singer; actor
- Instrument: Vocals
- Years active: 1988–2020

Nina Vladislavovna Kirso (Ukrainian: Ніна Владиславівна Кірсо); 4 August 1963 – 30 April 2020) was a Soviet and Ukrainian singer in the disco genre. She was the lead singer of the pop group Freestyle from 1988 to 2018. On April 30, 2020, Nina Kirso died at the age of 56. She was buried at the Monastery Cemetery in Poltava.

== Career ==
In 2014, the Freestyle group celebrated its 25th anniversary. By tradition, the artists met a new creative year on stage. Friends of the team also joined the festive show, including Mikhail Gritskan, with whom Nina Kirso sang the composition "Old House".

== Death ==
In 2018, she suffered a large stroke at her home, the artist had suffered a massive hemorrhagic stroke, and the situation was complicated by the untimely provision of medical care. In 2020, she died at the age of 56.
