= Nina Davies =

Nina Davies may refer to:

- Nina Davies (1881–1965), British archaeological illustrator who often worked as a team with her husband with both publishing work using the name N. de Garis Davies
- Nina Davies (cyclist) (born 1974), Welsh racing cyclist
