= Nina Brown Baker =

American author of biographies aimed at children

- Born: December 31, 1888; Galena, Kansas, U.S.
- Died: September 1, 1957 (aged 68); Brooklyn Heights, New York City
- Occupations: Teacher, writer
- Spouse: Sidney J. Baker (m. 1915)
- Children: 2
- Writing career
- Genre: Biographer

Nina Brown Baker (December 31, 1888 – September 1, 1957) was an American author of biographies aimed at children.

== Biography ==
Nina Brown was born in Galena, Kansas on December 31, 1888, to Frank and Belle (née Warren) Brown. She attended the University of Colorado where she completed a teaching certificate, graduating in 1911. She worked in Galena for a year before moving to Allison, Colorado to run a small school. The experience was uncomfortable; the town was little more than a couple of buildings and Baker was required to chop her own wood and other chores. She needed to ride a horse, an activity she had never learned before. She moved to Kansas City, Missouri where she took business courses and took office jobs. There, she met her future husband, Sidney J. Baker. After marriage, her teaching career was over.

Baker had first submitted a story which was accepted when she was nineteen. She had earned twenty five dollars for a short story to Good Housekeeping. When she was no longer teaching Baker returned to writing and had various pieces published leading to her first mystery book for children in 1931. She wrote several similar mystery stories before moving on, in about 1940, to writing biographies of famous individuals aimed at young people. By the end of her career she had produced over 25 books.

== Personal life ==
Baker married Sidney J. Baker in 1915. The couple had two daughters, Berenice and Nina. They moved around from Omaha to St. Louis and Chicago before settling in Brooklyn Heights in 1938. Baker died at her home on September 1, 1957 in Brooklyn, aged 68.

== Selected works ==
- Cyclone in calico : the story of Mary Ann Bickerdyke
- Amerigo Vespucci
- Juarez : hero of Mexico
- Juan Ponce de León
- He wouldn't be king : the story of Simón Bolívar
- Nickels and dimes : the story of F.W. Woolworth
- Peter the Great
- Sir Walter Raleigh
- Sun Yat-sen
- Henry Hudson
- The story of Christopher Columbus
- The Chinese riddle, a mystery story for girls
- The Secret of Hallam House
