= Nina Dimitrieff =

20th-century Russian-American opera singer

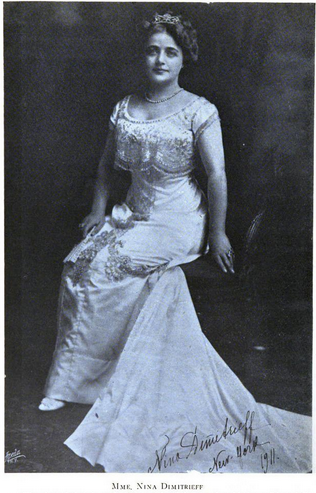
Nina Dimitrieff, from a 1913 festival program.

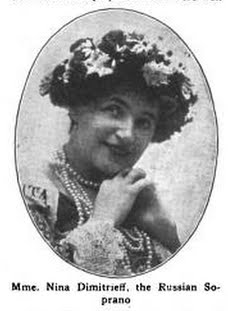
Nina Dimitrieff, from a 1916 publication.

Nina Dimitrieff (born 1880s – died after 1952), also seen as Nina Dmitrieff and later as Nina Massell, was a Russian soprano singer, active in the United States after 1910.

== Early life ==
Nina Dmitrieff self-reported as being born in Saint Petersburg in August 1881 or 1882, to Pheophan Dimitrieff and Baroness Alexandria Von Russell.

She was described in publicity as "daughter of the famous Russian general Pheophan Dimitrieff", and educated at Smolny Convent in Saint Petersburg, where she was a schoolmate of Elena of Montenegro.

== Career ==
Dimitrieff made her American debut as Margarita in The Damnation of Faust at the 1910 Worcester Music Festival. In that same year, the New York Times opined that "Her voice is not notable for fine quality, being, in fact, somewhat hard and unyielding; nor is she equally successful in many different styles of songs."

In 1911, she sang in California with other Russian musicians, and sang at concert conducted by Leopold Stokowski, and sang at a fundraiser for tuberculosis prevention in Pittsburgh. In 1913 Dimitrieff sang at "Verdi Night" at the May Festival of the Albany Musical Association, and gave a joint recital with Russian cellist Vladimir Dubinsky at New York's Aeolian Hall.

She returned to Aeolian Hall with a recital of Russian traditional songs in 1916, at which she also wore Russian costumes and gave a lecture on the history of Russian church music and folksongs. Also in 1916, she and other Russian artists including Mischa Levitzki, Anna Pavlova, and a balalaika orchestra performed at a benefit in Connecticut, for Russian prisoners of war.

Dimitrieff made several recordings for the Victor Talking Machine Company in 1916. Later in life, she taught voice classes, and accompanied other concert performers on piano.

== Personal life ==
Nina Dimitrieff married Jacob (James) Massell, a voice teacher and writer, in New York in June 1910. They continued living in New York through at least 1920. She was widowed when he died in 1948 in The Bronx. She was still alive to renew the copyright on her husband's book, To Sing or Not to Sing, in 1953.
