= Nino (name) =

- Nino is an Italian masculine name, a diminutive of Antonino, Giannino, Saturnino, Severino and names ending in "-nino" as well as of Gaetano and Giovanni. It is also used in Greece, Spain, and the Hispanosphere.
- In South Slavic countries, Nino is a hypocorism of Ninoslav.
- Nino is a Georgian name of Assyrian origin that is a popular feminine name, possibly related to the story of the husband of Semiramis, the founder of the city of Nineveh. It was popularized by the 4th century A.D. conversion of Georgia to Christianity by a Roman woman, Saint Nino, a relative of St. George, who came from Constantinople. In Slavic languages, the name is often written as Nina, a name that has multiple meanings.

== Nino in Georgia ==
- Nino, Princess of Mingrelia (1772 – 1847), Georgian princess royal
- Nino Abesadze (born 1965), Georgian-Israeli politician
- Nino Ananiashvili, birthname of Nina Ananiashvili (born 1963), Georgian ballerina
- Nino Batsiashvili (born 1987), Georgian chess grandmaster
- Nino Burjanadze (born 1964), Georgian politician
- Nino Chavchavadze (1812 – 1857), Georgian princess
- Nino Chkhartishvili (born 1999), Georgian footballer
- Nino Chkuaseli (born 1988), Georgian footballer
- Nino Dadeshkeliani (1890 – 1931), Georgian author
- Nino Diasamidze (born 1992), Georgian gymnast
- Nino Yakovlevna Dumbadze, known as Nina Dumbadze (1919 – 1983), Soviet discus athlete
- Nino Gurieli (born 1961), Georgian chess player
- Nino Gvenetadze (born 1964), Georgian magistrate
- Nino Gvetadze, Georgian classical pianist
- Nino Aleksi-Meskhishvili (1896 – 1956), Georgian actor
- Nino Haratischwili (born 1983), Georgian writer
- Nino Imeretinsky (1807-1847), Georgian royal princess
- Nino Iobashvili (born 1984), Georgian politician
- Nino Janjgava (born 1964), Georgian composer
- Nino Kalandadze (born 1977), Georgian politician
- Nino Katamadze (born 1972), Georgian jazz singer
- Nino Khomeriki (born 1998), Georgia chess Woman Grandmaster
- Nino Khurtsidze (1975 – 2018), Georgian chess player
- Nino Kipiani, Georgian lawyer
- Nino Kirtadze (born 1968), Georgian journalist, filmmaker and actress
- Nino Lomjaria (born 1984), Georgian lawyer
- Nino Louarsabishvili (born 1977), Georgian tennis player
- Nino Machaidze (born 1983), Georgian soprano
- Nino Maisuradze (born 1982), Georgian-French chess player
- Nino Nakashidze (1872 — 1963), Georgian writer
- Nino Odzelashvili (born 1990), Georgian sambo practitioner and judoka
- Nino Pasikashvili (born 1991), Georgian footballer
- Nino Qazarashvili (born 1979), Georgian diver
- Nino Ramishvili (1910 - 2000), Georgian ballerina
- Nino Salia (1898 – 1992), Georgian historian and philologist
- Nino Salukvadze (born 1969), Georgian shooter
- Nino Sulaberidze, known by the stage name Nina Sublatti (born 1995), Georgian singer, songwriter, and model
- Nino Surguladze (born 1977), Georgian mezzo-soprano
- Nino Sutidze (born 1992), Georgian footballer
- Nino Tibilashvili (born 1997), Georgian wheelchair fencer
- Nino Tsiklauri (born 1993), Georgian alpine skier
- Nino Tsilosani (born 1982), Georgian politician
- Nino Uchadze (born 1965), Georgian sport shooter
- Saint Nino (c. 296 – c. 338 or 340), Greek Christian

== Other ==
=== Given name ===
- Nino (priestess), Athenian priestess
- Nino Adom-Malaki (born 2004), English footballer
- Nino Anderlini (1926–2004), Italian cross country skier
- Nino Aquila (died 2013), Italian philatelist
- Nino Assirelli (1925 – 2018), Italian racing cyclist
- Nino Bertasio (born 1988), Italian golfer
- Nino Besozzi (1901 – 1971), Italian actor
- Nino Bibbia (1922 – 2013), Italian skeleton racer and bobsledder
- Nino Bixio (1821 – 1873), Italian general, patriot and politician
- Nino Bolzoni (1903 – 1972), Italian rower
- Nino Borsari (1911 – 1996), Italian cyclist
- Nino Bule (born 1976), Croatian football
- Nino Buonocore (born 1958), Italian singer-songwriter
- Nino Camardo (born 1949), Italian painter
- Nino Castelli (1898–1925), Italian rower
- Nino Cerruti (1930–2022), Italian fashion designer
- Nino Cesarini, nickname of Antonio Cesarini (1889–1943), Italian model
- Nino Cipri, American speculative fiction author
- Nino Cocchiarella (born 1933), Professor of logic and ontology
- Nino Crisman (1911–1983), Italian actor and film producer
- Nino Cristofori (1930–2015), Italian politician
- Nino Da Silva (born 1979), Brazilian footballer
- Nino DeFranco (born 1955) The DeFranco Family guitarist
- Nino Defilippis (1932 – 2010), Italian road bicycle racer
- Nino del Arco (born 1958), lawyer and former child actor
- Nino Del Pesco (1959-2019), American musician
- Nino Defilippis (1932–2010), Italian cyclist
- Nino Eller (fl. 1931–1942), Italian actor
- Nino Everaers (born 1999), Dutch football player
- Nino Fernandez (born 1984), German actor
- Nino Ferrer stage name of Nino Agostino Arturo Maria Ferrari (1934–1998), Italian-French singer
- Nino Filastò (1938–2021), Italian lawyer and writer
- Nino Frank (1904 − 1988), Italian-born French film critic
- Nino Galović (born 1992), Croatian footballer
- Nino Gorissen (born 1997), Dutch basketball player
- Nino Habun (born 1979), Croatian sprinter
- Nino Henry (born 1992), Antiguan cricketer
- Nino Imperato, known as N. Imperato (born c. 1890s), Italian stamp forger
- Nino Kirov (1943 — 2008), Bulgarian chess Grandmaster
- Nino Kouter (born 1993), Slovenian footballer
- Nino Lo Bello, American journalist
- Nino Lombardo (died 2018), Italian politician
- Nino Longobardi (born 1953), Italian artist
- Nino Luraghi (born 1964), Italian historian
- Nino Mangione (born 1987), American politician
- Nino Marcelli (c. 1890 – 1967), Italian composer and conductor
- Nino Marcelli (born 2005), Slovak footballer
- Nino Marchesini (1895 – 1961), Italian actor
- Nino Marchetti (1909 – 1983), Italian actor
- Nino Marković (born 1962), Croatian handball player
- Nino Martini (1902 — 1976), Italian operatic tenor and actor
- Nino Martoglio (1870 — 1921), Italian writer
- Nino Merola (born 1991), British real tennis player
- Nino Muñoz (born 1973), Chilean-Canadian photographer
- Nino Navarra (1885 – 1917), Italian poet, writer and orator
- Nino Niederreiter (born 1992), Swiss ice hockey player
- Nino Nini (died 1564), Roman Catholic prelate
- Nino Oliviero (1918 – 1980), Italian composer
- Nino Pasti (1909–1992), Italian politician
- Nino Pavese (1904 – 1979), Italian actor
- Nino Pavić, nickname of Ninoslav Pavić, European businessman
- Nino Pecoraro (1899–1973), claimed and debunked Italian spiritualist medium
- Nino Pekarić (born 1982), Serbian footballer
- Nino Pirrotta (1908 – 1998), Italian musicologist
- Nino Pisano (fl. 1349 – 1368), Italian sculptor
- Nino Pungaršek (born 1995), Slovenian footballer
- Nino Quevedo (1929 – 2006), Spanish screenwriter and film director
- Nino Randazzo (1932 – 2019), Italian politician
- Nino Raspudić (born 1975), Bosnian and Herzegovinian, philosopher, writer and political analyst
- Nino Ricci (born 1959), Canadian novelist
- Nino Rojas (born 1987), Chilean footballer
- Nino Konis Santana (1957 – 1998), East Timorese freedom fighter
- Nino Sanzogno (1911 – 1983), Italian conductor and composer
- Nino Schurter (born 1986), Swiss cross-country cyclist
- Nino Segarra (born 1954), Puerto Rican musician
- Nino Serdarušić (born 1996), Croatian tennis player
- Nino Sozzani (1889 – 1977), Italian general
- Nino Strano (1950 – 2023), Italian politician
- Nino Taranto (1907 – 1986), Italian film actor
- Nino Tempo (1935 – 2025), American musician, singer, and actor
- Nino Terzo (1923 – 2005), Italian actor
- Nino Vaccarella (1933 – 2021), Italian race car driver
- Nino Valeri (1897 - 1978), Italian historian
- Nino Vella (1992 – 2024), French composer, pianist, singer, and music producer
- Nino Vingelli (1912 – 2003), Italian film actor
- Nino Vitale (born 1970), American politician
- Nino Ziswiler (born 1999), Swiss association football player
- Nino Žugelj (born 2000), Slovenian footballer

=== Nickname/stagename ===
- MC Nino, stagename of Terry Jones, vocalist and keyboardist for English music group Baby D (dance group)
- Nino, nickname of Phillip Martin III (born 1968), African-American entertainer and businessman
- Nino (footballer, born 1943) (Eidnilson José Torres Alves), Brazilian football forward
- Nino (footballer, born 1980) (Juan Francisco Martínez Modesto), Spanish football striker
- Nino (footballer, born 1983) (Constantino Ibarra Navarro), Spanish football defender
- Nino (footballer, born 1997) (Marcilio Florencio Mota Filho), Brazilian football defender
- Nino Alejandro, nickname of Christopher Caesar Alejandro (born 1976), Filipino musician
- Nino Antonelli, nickname of Cosimo Antonelli (1925 – 2014), Italian water polo player
- Nino Arrúa, nickname of Saturnino Arrúa (born 1949), Paraguayan footballer
- Nino Baragli, whose birthname is Giovanni Baragli (1925 – 2013), Italian film editor
- Nino Baskoro, nickname of Anindyo Baskoro, vocalist for Indonesian band RAN (Indonesian group)
- Nino Benvenuti, nickname of Giovanni Benvenuti (born 1938), Italian boxer and actor
- Nino Bianco, nickname of Antonio Bianco (1951 – 2009), South African scientist
- Nino Bongiovanni, nickname of Anthony Thomas Bongiovanni (1911 – 2009), American baseball player and manager
- Nino Bravo stage name of Luis Manuel Ferri Llopis (1944 – 1973), Spanish singer
- Nino Buscató, also known as Francisco Buscató or Francisco Buscató (born 1940), Spanish basketball player and coach
- Nino Castellini, nickname of Antonio Castellini (1951 – 1976), Italian boxer
- Nino Castelnuovo, nickname of Francesco Castelnuovo (1936–2021), Italian actor
- Nino Costa, nickname of Giovanni Costa (1826 – 1903), Italian painter
- Nino Cottone, nickname of Antonio Cottone (1904/1905 – 1956), Sicilian Mafioso
- Nino Culotta, pen name of John O'Grady, (1907 – 1981), Australian writer
- Nino D'Angelo, nickname of Gaetano D'Angelo (born 1957), Italian singer
- Nino de Angelo, stagename of Domenico Gerhard Gorgoglione (born 1963), German singer
- Nino del Arco, nickname of Leonardo del Arco Barrera (born 1958), Spanish actor
- Nino Di Matteo nickname of Antonio Di Matteo (born 1961), Italian magistrate
- Nino Durden, nickname Gino Floyd Durden (born 1963), American police officer
- Nino Escalera, nickname of Saturnino Escalera Cuadrado (1929–2021), Puerto Rican baseball player
- Nino Espinosa, nickname of Arnulfo Acevedo Espinosa (1953 – 1987), Dominican baseball player
- Nino Farina, nickname of Giuseppe Antonio Farina (1906 – 1966), Italian racing driver
- Nino Firetto, nickname of Anthony Edward Paolo Firetto (born 1957), British entertainer
- Nino Frassica, nickname of Antonio Frassica (born 1950), Italian actor
- Nino Gaggi, nickname of Anthony Frank Gaggi who was also known as "Antonino" (1925 – 1988), American organized crime figure
- Nino Garris, nickname of Stefano Garris (born 1979), German basketball player
- Nino Giarratano, nickname of Anthony Giarratano (born 1962), American baseball coach
- Nino Giuffrè, nickname of Antonino Giuffrè (born 1945), Italian mafioso
- Nino Guerreiro nickname of Éderson da Silva Lima (born 1981), Brazilian footballer
- Nino Herman (Chananya) (born 1952), Israeli art-photographer
- Nino Host-Venturi, whose real name is Giovanni Host-Venturi, (1892 – 1980), Italian fascist politician and historian
- Nino Lema, nickname of Benign Lema Mejuto (born 1964), Spanish footballer
- Nino Manfredi, nickname of Saturnino Manfredi (1921 – 2004), Italian actors
- Nino Nipote, nickname of Antonio Nipote (1925–1997), Italian singer
- Nino Nutrizio nickname of Stefano Nutrizio (1911–1988), Dalmatian Italian journalist
- Nino Oxilia, whose birthname is Angelo Agostino Adolfo Oxilia (1889–1917), Italian playwright
- Nino Paraíba, nickname of Severino de Ramos Clementino da Silva (born 1986), Brazilian footballer
- Nino Porzio, whose birthname is Antonino Porzio (born 1972), Italian singer and actor
- Nino Pršeš, stagename of Vahidin Pršeš, Bosnian singer
- Nino Ramsby (born Nina Ramsby, 1972), Swedish singer-songwriter
- Nino Rešić, stage name of Nikola Rešić who was born Amir Rešić (1964 – 2007), Bosnian and Serbian singer
- Nino Rota, nickname of Giovanni Rota Rinaldi (1911 – 1979), Italian composer
- Nino Rotolo, nickname of Antonio Rotolo who is also known as Antonino (born 1946), Italian Mafia boss
- Nino Rovelli, nickname of Angelo Rovelli (1917 – 1990), Italian bobsledder
- Nino Salvo, nickname of Antonio Salvo (1929 – 1986), Italian businessman
- Nino Santos, nickname of Alecsandro Aparecido dos Santos (born 1984), Brazilian footballer
- Nino Scalia, nickname of Antonin Scalia (1936 – 2016), American jurist
- Nino Schembri, nickname of Antônio Schembri (born 1974), Brazilian mixed martial artist
- Nino Spirlì, nickname of Antonino Spirlì (born 1961), Italian politician
- Nino Staffieri, also known as Bassano Staffieri (1931 – 2018), Italian bishop
- Nino Sydney, Hrvoj Oskar Ninoslav Pleminiti Somogji (died 2022), Australian architect
- Nino Tahvili, a nickname of Omid Tahvili (born 1970), Iranian gangster
- Nino Tempo, whose birthname is Antonino LoTempio (1935–2025), American entertainer
- Nino Vieira, nickname of João Bernardo Vieira (1939 – 2009), Bissau-Guinean politician
- Nino Visconti, whose real name is Ugolino Visconti (died 1298), Italian judge
- Nino Xypolitas, whose birthname is Stefanos Sakellarios Xypolitas and is known professionally as Nino (born 1981), Greek singer
- Nino Zec, nickname of Ninoslav Zec (born 1949), Yugoslav footballer
- Nino, nickname for Thanapat Thaothawong also known as Thaiboy Digital (born 1994), Thai rapper.

=== Middle name ===
- Egisto Nino Ceccatelli (born 1943), Italian photographer
- Vittorio Nino Novarese (1907 – 1983), Italian costume designer

=== Surname ===
- Carlos Santiago Nino (1943–1993), Argentine philosopher
- Consiglio Di Nino (born 1938), Italian who served as a Canadian politician
- Esteban Nino (born 1986), Argentine cricketer
- Lynn Di Nino (born 1945), American artist

== Fictional characters ==
- Nino, the mage girl from the video game Fire Emblem: The Blazing Blade
- Nino, the younger brother of Victor from the comedy-drama film Raising Victor Vargas
- Nino Falcone, one of the main characters from The Camorra Chronicles book series by author Cora Reilly.
- Nino Lahiffe, a character in the animated series Miraculous: Tales of Ladybug & Cat Noir, the best friend of male protagonist Adrien Agreste
- Nino Nakano, The second sister of the Nakano sisters of The Quintessential Quintuplets
- Nino Quincampoix, the romantic male lead character in the Amélie film and musical
- Nino Sarratore, one of the main characters of the Neapolitan Novels series by Italian author Elena Ferrante (adapted on television for HBO, Rai and TIMvision in 2018 under the name of the first novel My Brilliant Friend).
- Nino, the wizard boy and main character of the Brazilian children's programme "Castelo Rá-Tim-Bum".

== See also ==
- Nino (disambiguation)
- 9 (disambiguation)
- Neno (name)
- Nilo (name)
- Nina (name)
- Niño (name)
- Ninos (name)
- Nin (surname)
- Ning (surname)
- Nico (given name)
- Nuno (given name)
- Nuño, given name
- NIO (disambiguation)
- Niko (disambiguation)
- Nano (disambiguation)
- Nono (disambiguation)
- Nini (disambiguation)
- Santo Niño (disambiguation)
- Nino and the Ebb Tides, musical group
- Ninho
