= Movement for Peace (disambiguation) =

Movement for Peace is a British organisation.

Movement for Peace may also refer to:

- A peace movement
- Movement for Peace with Justice and Dignity, a Mexican movement protesting the Mexican drug war
- Movement for Peace and Socialism, an Italian political party founded by Nino Pasti in 1986
