= Enrico Mattei Airfield =

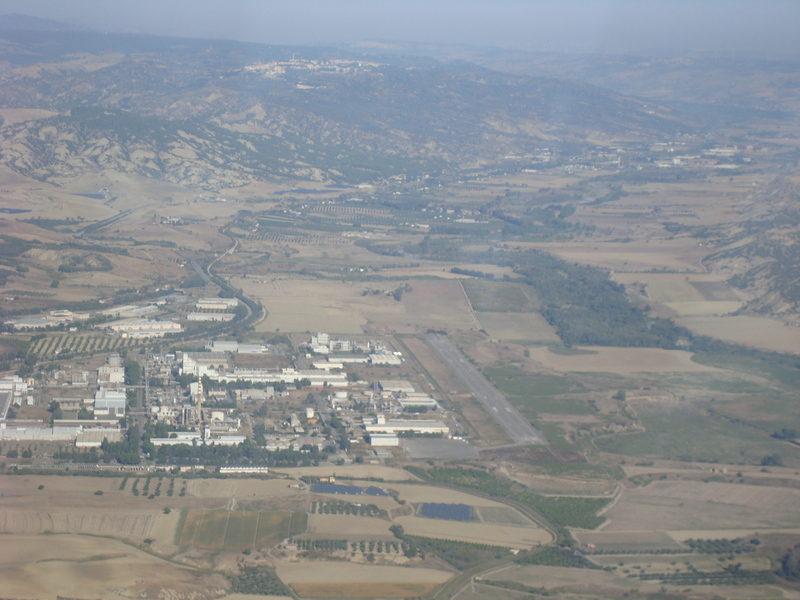
- IATA: none; ICAO: none

Summary
- Airport type: Public
- Serves: Pisticci, Basilicata, Italy
- Location: Pisticci Scalo, Pisticci, Province of Matera, Italy
- Closed: December 16, 2017
- Elevation AMSL: 157 ft (48 m)
- Coordinates: 40°25′57″N 16°33′16″E
- Interactive map of Enrico Mattei Airfield

Runways
Direction	Length		Surface
Direction	ft	m	Surface
13/31			Asphalt

The Enrico Mattei Airfield (Italian: Aviosuperficie Enrico Mattei) is an aerodrome in Pisticci Scalo, a frazione in the comune of Pisticci in the province of Matera, roughly 4 km north of the town.

In the 2010s an attempt was made to strengthen the structure so that it could become a real airport ("Basilicata Airport") but as of December 16, 2017 it is not in operation.

== History ==
The structure was built in the 1960s on the perimeter of the Anic plant during the industrialization of the Basento Valley at the initiative of Enrico Mattei as part of his strategy to increase his personal speed of movement between Eni sites. After having remained unused for a long time, in October 2007 a project was delivered to the Basilicata region which includes the construction of infrastructure works and the improvement of services for the creation of a third-level regional civil airport, for a total expected investment of approximately 8 million euros.

== Gallery ==
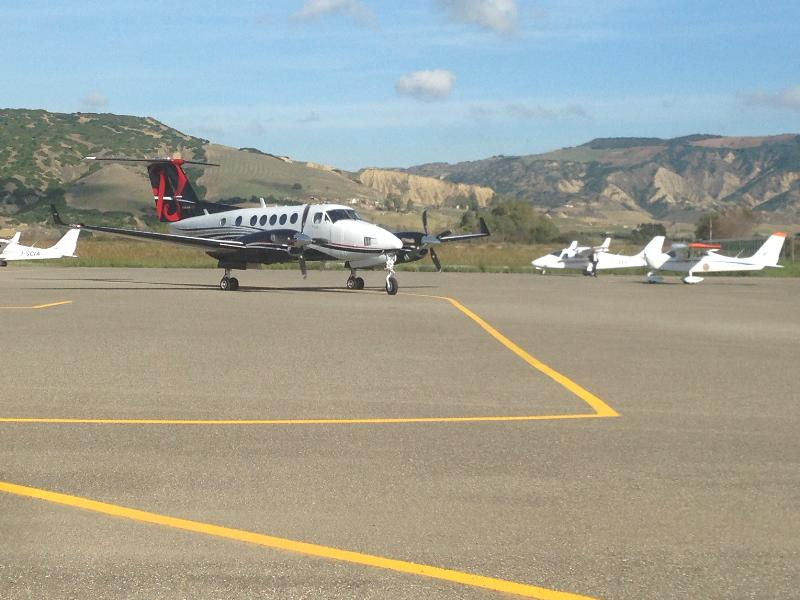
Beechcraft Super King Air

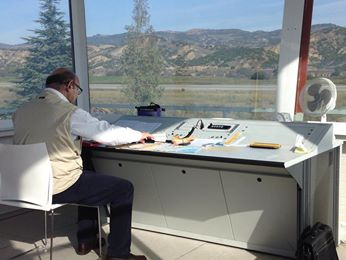
Control Room

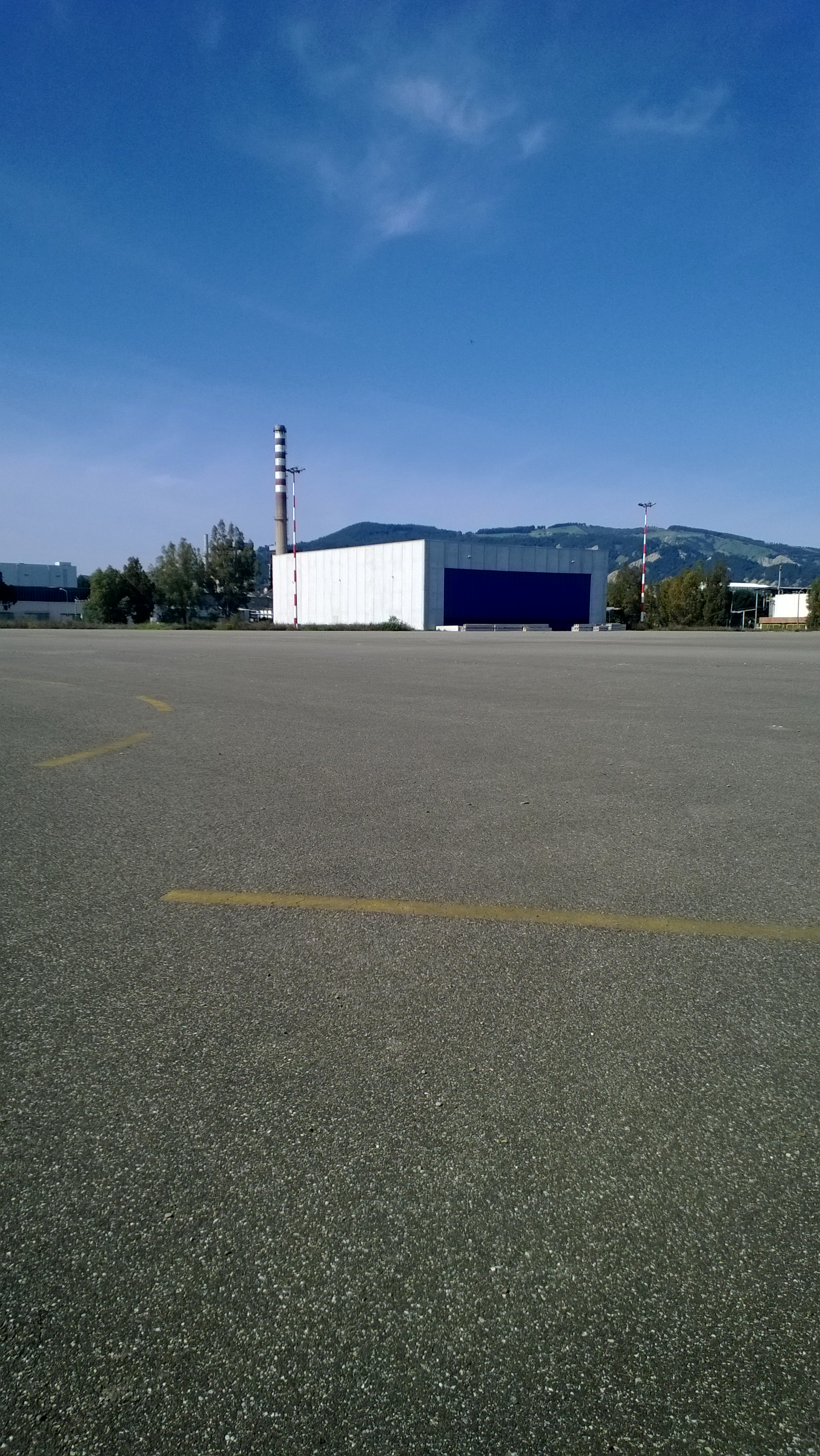
Hangar

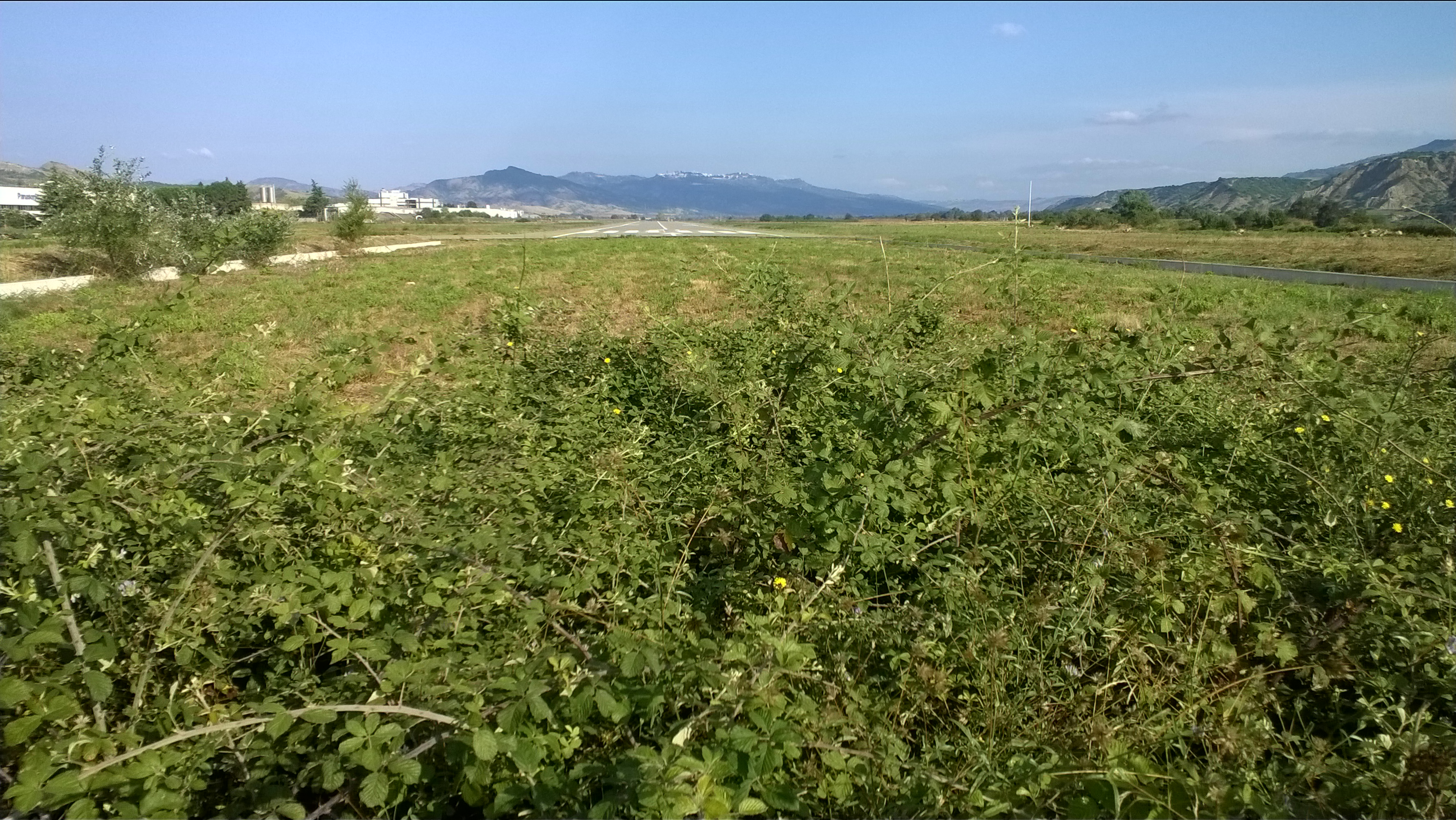
Rear view of the runway
