= Nicholas Rhabdas =

14th century Byzantine mathematician

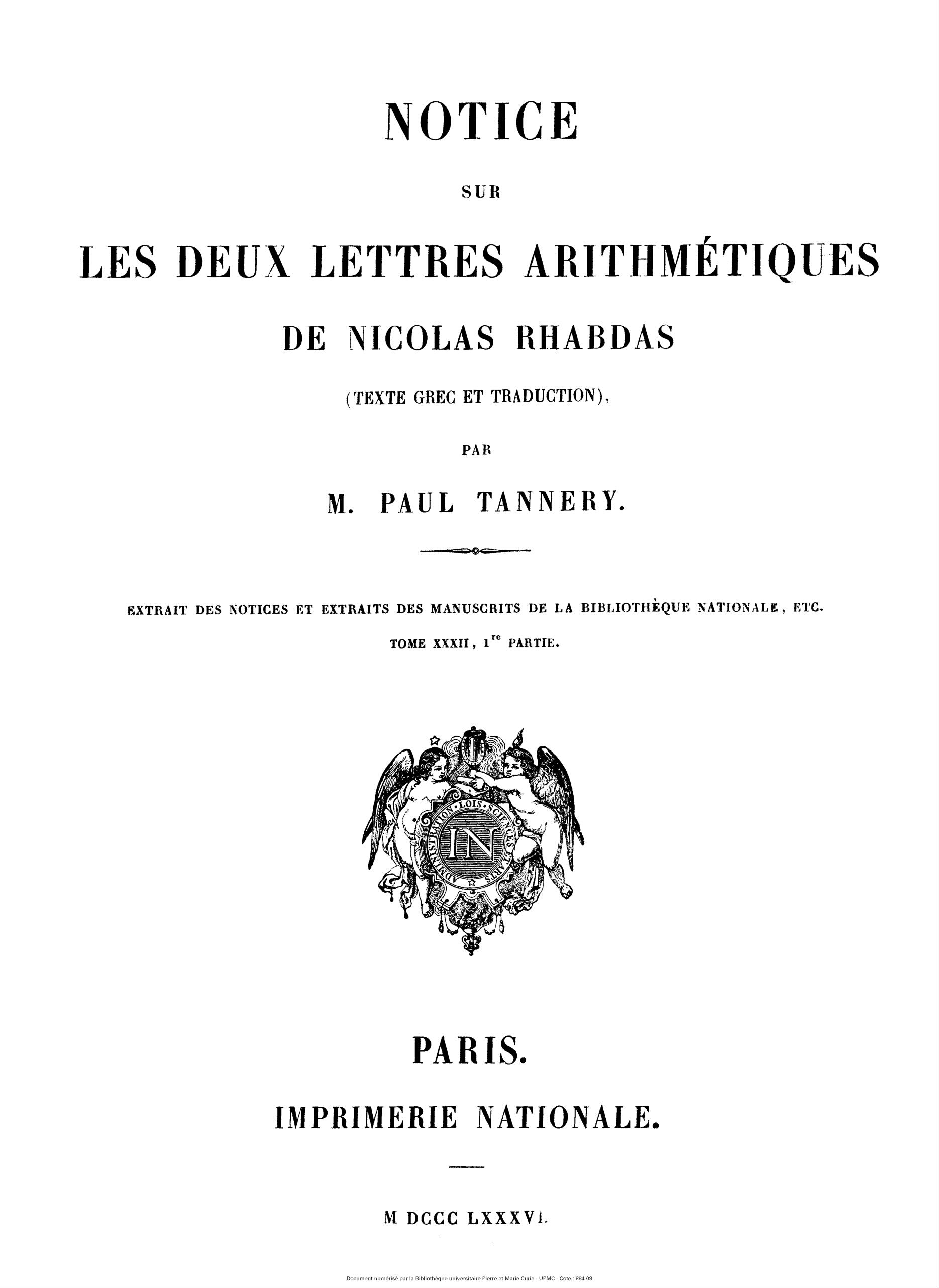
First page of Notice sur les deux lettres arithmétiques de Nicolas Rhabdas, published in 1886 in French.

Nicholas Artabasdos Rhabdas (Note: Also spelled as Nicolaus Rhabdas, Nicolaus Smyrnæus, Nicolaus Artabasdus Rhabdas, and Artabasdus Nicolaus Rhabdas.) was an early-14th century Byzantine mathematician. Born in Smyrna, he occupied a position in imperial administration in Constantinople. He is known for three mathematical letters and an unpublished grammatical treatise.

== Biography ==
Little is known about his life. Nicholas Artabasdos Rhabdas was born in Smyrna, and occupied a "high-brow imperial functionary of the imperial fiscal administration" position in Constantinople c. 1320–1342. Nicholas Adontz argued, based on his name (from Armenian Artavazd) that he was certainly Armenian and had "just arrived in Smyrna from the east" and was not an old resident of Byzantium.

A. Riehle offered new periodization of Rhabdas' life, and assumed that he was born c. 1295, based on a letter to Andronikos Zarides, that tells that "a partial solar eclipse will occur on June 26, 1321, while a lunar eclipse will take place on July 10, 1321." Manuel Moschopoulos dedicated to Rhabdas a treatise on magic squares, and calls him "arithmetician and geometer"; the Greek word for "geometer" can also be translated as "land-surveyor". Through Moschopoulos and Zarides, pupils of Maximos Planudes, Rhabdas can be connected to Planudes' school. Through his mathematical works, Rhabdas was also connected to Nikephoros Gregoras.

== Mathematical works ==
Rhabdas is known for three mathematical works written in the form of letters.

First one, to Theodore Tzavoukhes of Klazomenai, usually called "Letter to Tzavoukhes", is about arithmetical computation of fractions, square roots of nonsquare numbers, the date of Easter, and the so-called Palamede's Tables. In the letter Rhabdas calculates the date of Easter for a "current year", that's stated as 1341.

Second letter, to George Khatzykes, who served under Andronikos II, usually called "Letter to Khatzykes", is on the value of the Greek alphabetical numbers, on finger-reckoning ("how to represent integers from 1 to 9,999 on the fingers of the hands"), on the four arithmetical procedures, and on the order of numbers in a base-ten system. The second letter is more advanced then the first one, "explaining the operations with fractions with a sequence of unit fractions (of the type 3 + 1/3 + 1/14 + 1/42 ···) and the extraction of the square root of a non-square number. This is followed by a procedure for calculating the date of Easter and a series of practical problems involving the money, weights, and measures used at that time."

Third letter, on Easter Computus, sometimes called "Letter to Myrsiniotes", was addressed to Demetrius Myrsiniotes, an older friend of Rhabdas. Fabio Acerbi has found that most of the calculations in the letter are correct, but Rhabdas' Computus "contains some serious methodological mistakes ... suggesting that the material for which Rhabdas claims original authorship was, in fact, drawn from other sources."

The structure of all three letters is identical; all three starts with an extract from the beginning of Diophantus' Arithmetica.

He is also known for a treatise on grammar written for his son, Paul Artabasdos. There, Rhabdas gave "a grammatical compendium whose aim is expounding the appropriate use of words, in order to avoid barbarisms and solecisms."

In 2019, a new work of Rhabdas was found. Written on November 16, 1322, it contains a "procedure by means of which every arithmetic and geometric means can be found, either being of a double ratio or of a triple or of a multiple or of a multiple-epimoric or of a multiple-epimeric, or epidimeric, and in general of whatever it is of all ratios". The unpublished work was found in a codex in Paris. Acerbi calls this Procedure "a poor piece of mathematics", marred with errors.
