= Ninoslav =

Ninoslav is a Serbian and Croatian given name. Notable people with the name include:

- Ninoslav Erić (born 1976), Serbian politician
- Ninoslav Krstić (1946–2012), Serbian and Yugoslav general
- Ninoslav Milenković (born 1977), Bosnian footballer
- Ninoslav Pavelić (born 1973), Croatian handball coach
- Ninoslav Pavić, Croatian media mogul
- Ninoslav Parmaković (born 1982), Croatian footballer
- Ninoslav Radovanović (born 1940), Serbian cardiac surgeon
- Ninoslav Saraga (born 1969), Croatian rower
- Ninoslav Tmušić (born 1973), Serbian basketball player
- Ninoslav Zec (born 1949), Serbian footballer

== See also ==
- Nino (name)
