= University of Florence =

Public university in Florence, Italy

Coordinates: 43°46′40″N 11°15′31″E

- Università degli Studi di Firenze
- Latin: Florentina Studiorum Universitas
- Type: Public
- Established: 1859; 167 years ago
- Affiliations: EUA, CESAER
- Rector: Alessandra Petrucci
- Administrative staff: 2,288
- Students: 51,000
- Location: Florence, Italy
- Campus: Urban
- Sports teams: CUS Firenze
- Website: www.unifi.it

The University of Florence (Italian: Università degli Studi di Firenze) (UNIFI) is an Italian public research university located in Florence, Italy. It comprises 12 schools and has around 50,000 students enrolled.

== History ==
The university dates from 1859, when Leopold II, Grand Duke of Tuscany lost power and a group of disparate higher-studies institutions were grouped together into the Istituto di Studi Superiori Pratici e di Perfezionamento. A year later, this was recognized as a fully-fledged university by the government of the Kingdom of Sardinia, when it annexed the United Provinces of Central Italy. In 1865, the new Kingdom of Italy chose Florence as its temporary capital, but it was replaced by Rome soon after the Capture of Rome in 1870.

In 1923, the Istituto was renamed as a University by the Italian Parliament.

An earlier university in Florence was the Studio Fiorentino, which was established by the Florentine Republic in 1321. The Studium was recognized by Pope Clement VI in 1349, and authorized to grant regular degrees. The Pope also established that the first Italian faculty of theology would be in Florence. The Studium became an imperial university (referring to the Holy Roman Empire) in 1364, but in 1473 it was moved to Pisa, when Lorenzo the Magnificent gained control of Florence. Charles VIII moved it back to Florence in 1497, but in 1515 it was moved to Pisa again when the Medici family returned to power.

== Organization ==
The university is subdivided into 12 schools, which are: Agriculture; Architecture; Arts; Economics; Education; Engineering; Law; Mathematics, Physics and Natural Sciences; Medicine and Surgery; Pharmacology; Political Science; and Psychology.

Faculties are located in traditionally strategic areas based on their subject matter. The Faculty of Economics, Faculty of Law and the Faculty of Political Sciences are in the Polo delle Scienze Sociali (campus of social sciences), in the Novoli district, near the new courthouse. The Faculty of Medicine and Surgery, the Faculty of Pharmacology, and certain scientific and engineering departments are in the Careggi district, close to the hospital. The Faculty of Engineering is located at the S. Marta Institute, whereas the Faculty of Agriculture is in front of the Parco delle Cascine. The Faculty of Mathematical, Physical and Natural Sciences is located in Sesto Fiorentino. The Faculty of Architecture is in the center of the city, as the Accademia di Belle Arti, home of Michelangelo's David. The Faculties of Literature, History, Philosophy, and Pedagogy are in the centre of Florence.

University rankings

Global – Overall
- QS World: =404 (2026)

== School of Law ==
The University hosts one of the leading Italian law schools, repeatedly recognised as a national "Department of Excellence" by the Italian Ministry of Education, University, and Research. Alumni and faculty members of the University of Florence School of Law have held leading positions in government. They include Presidents of the Italian Constitutional Court Silvana Sciarra, Paolo Grossi, Ugo de Siervo, and Enzo Cheli, President of the International Criminal Tribunal for the former Jugoslavia and Special Tribunal for Lebanon Antonio Cassese, Judge of the International Court of Justice Giorgio Gaja, Judge of the Court of Justice of the European Union Roberto Mastroianni, former Prime Ministers of the Italian Republic Matteo Renzi and Giuseppe Conte, and members of the Constituent Assembly Piero Calamandrei and Giorgio La Pira.

== Notable people ==
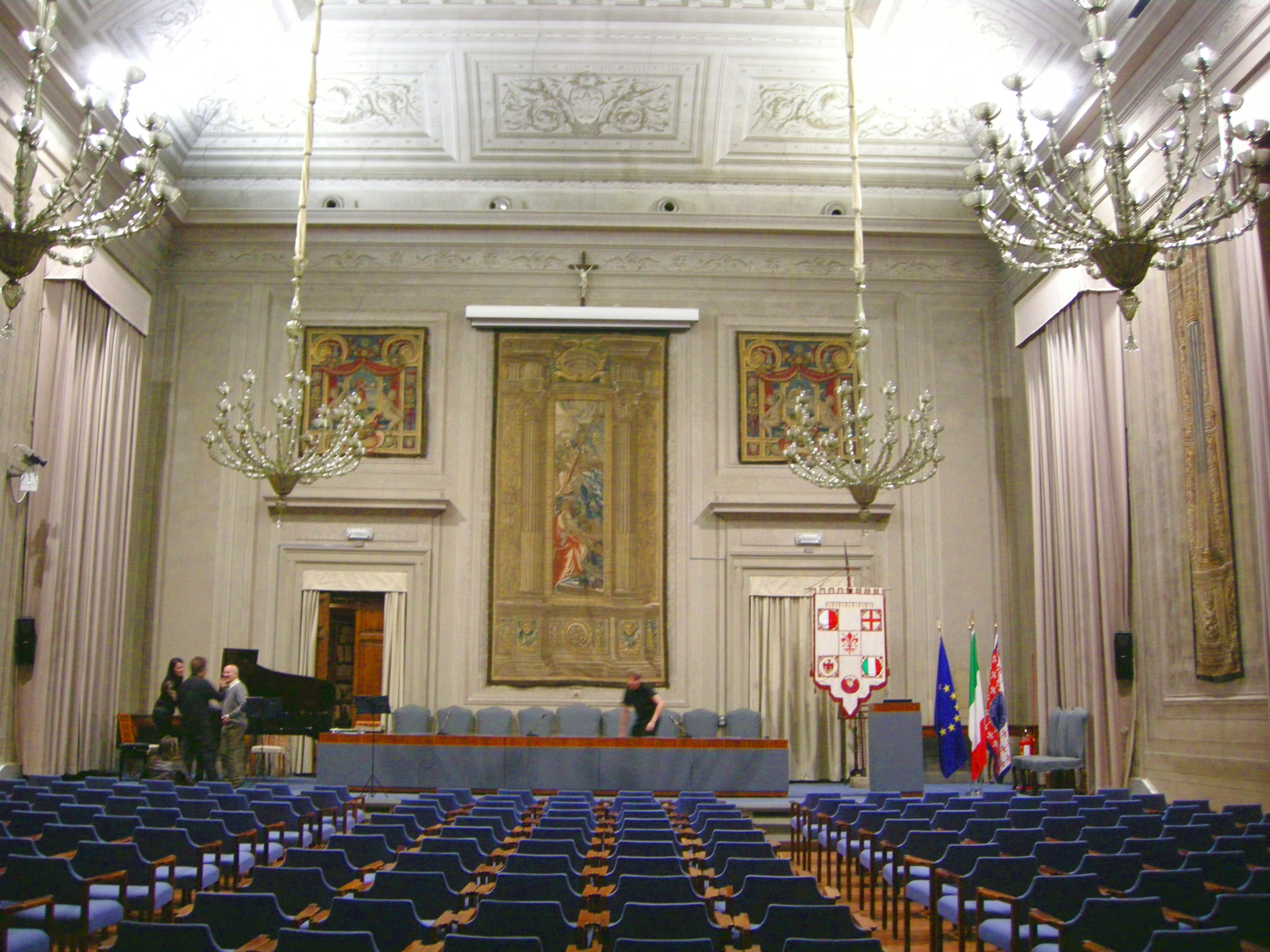
Rectorate's auditorium

=== Alumni ===
Notable alumni of the University of Florence include:

- Italian journalists Indro Montanelli, Oriana Fallaci, Nadia Toffa
- Former Governor General of Canada and current Secretary-General of La Francophonie Michaëlle Jean
- Pope Pius II
- Italian Prime Ministers Giovanni Spadolini, Lamberto Dini and Matteo Renzi
- Kelantan royal family Tengku Muhammad Fa-iz Petra
- Italian political leaders Giorgio La Pira
- Architect Pier Carlo Bontempi
- President of the European Parliament, David Sassoli.
- Architect Hamid Gabbay
- Astrophysicist Margherita Hack
- Immunologist Paola Ricciardi-Castagnoli
- Philosopher Giacomo Marramao
- United Nations official Annalisa Ciampi
- Poets Margherita Guidacci and Mario Luzi
- Doctor Francesco Antommarchi, personal doctor of Napoleon
- Judge Abdulqawi Ahmed Yusuf of the International Court of Justice
- Philosopher Giovanni Gentile
- Indian Luge Player Shiva Keshavan
- Francesco Milleri, CEO of Luxottica
- Giulio Racah, Acting President of the Hebrew University of Jerusalem
- Mirella Levi D'Ancona, art historian
- Egisto Nino Ceccatelli, photographer
- Football coach Francesco Farioli (studied Philosophy and Sports Science)
- Cultural anthropologist Anita Seppilli
- Physicist Gian-Luca Oppo

=== Faculty ===
- John Argyropoulos taught Greek from 1456.
- Raphael Badius, dean in 1681
- Carlo Emilio Bonferroni, statistician
- Giovanni Boccaccio, poet, professor of Ancient Greek and Literature
- Piero Calamandrei, jurist, professor in the faculty of law, born in 1889.
- Antonio Cassese, international jurist, president of several international tribunals
- Mario Draghi, prime minister of Italy from 2021 to 2022, President of ECB, full professor of Monetary Economics and Monetary Policy in the faculty of Political Science from 1981 to 1991.
- Enrico Fermi, physicist and Nobel Prize winner, professor of Mathematical Physics
- Giorgio Gaja, international jurist, former member of the International Law Commission and judge of the International Court of Justice
- Paolo Grossi, judge of the Constitutional Court of Italy
- Mario Luzi, poet, professor of French language and Literature
- Giovanni Sartori, political scientist, professor of Political Science, born in 1924 in Florence.
- Giovanni Spadolini, historian and important Italian politician, professor of Contemporary History, born in 1925 in Florence.
- Leonardo da Vinci carried out studies on anatomy at the Santa Maria Nuova Hospital in the center of town which is today a teaching hospital affiliated with the University of Florence.
- Giuseppe Conte, prime minister of Italy from 2018 to 2021, teaches private law

== Points of interest ==
- Museo Galileo
- Museo di Storia Naturale di Firenze
- Orto Botanico di Firenze

== See also ==
- List of forestry universities and colleges
- List of Italian universities
- List of medieval universities
