= Raphael Badius =

Italian historian

Raphael Badius was a Florentine Dominican of the seventeenth century.

== Overview ==
Badius was versed in Tuscan and Florentine antiquities, and his researches made him conversant with matters of history and hagiography. He rendered assistance to the Jesuit Fathers, Godfrey Henschen and Papebroch, in their labours on the Acta Sanctorum, as they themselves acknowledge.

As Chronicler of the Convent of Santa Maria Novella, Florence, he was also known to the historian and bibliographer Cinellus, who makes frequent mention of the learned Dominican's knowledge of the literature and writers of Florence. In 1681, he was Dean of the University of Florence.
