= Manuel Moschopoulos =

Byzantine commentator and grammarian

Manuel Moschopoulos (Latinized as Manuel Moschopulus; Greek: Mανουὴλ Μοσχόπουλος), was a Byzantine commentator and grammarian, who lived during the end of the 13th and the beginning of the 14th century and was an important figure in the Palaiologan Renaissance. Moschopoulos means "little calf," and is probably a nickname.

== Life ==
Moschopoulos was a student of Maximos Planudes and possibly his successor as a head of a school in Constantinople, where he taught throughout his life. A mysterious and ill-documented excursion into politics led to his imprisonment for a while.

== Works ==
His chief work is Erotemata grammaticalia (Ἐρωτήματα Γραμματικά), in the form of question and answer, based upon an anonymous epitome of grammar, and supplemented by a lexicon of Attic nouns. He was also the author of scholia on the first and second books of the Iliad, on Hesiod, Theocritus, Pindar and other classical and later authors; of riddles, letters, and a treatise on the magic squares. His grammatical treatises formed the foundation of the labors of such promoters of classical studies as Manuel Chrysoloras, Theodorus Gaza, Guarini, and Constantine Lascaris. As an editor, while making many false conjectures, he was responsible for clearing many long-standing errors in the traditional texts. His comments when original, are mainly lexicographical.

Moschopoulos' treatise on magic squares is dedicated to Nicholas Rhabdas, his contemporary mathematician.

Other works include an anti-Latin theological pamphlet. A selection from his works under the title of Manuelis Moschopuli opuscula grammatica was published by F. N. Titze (Leipzig, 1822); see also Karl Krumbacher, Geschichte der byzantinischen Litteratur (1897) and M. Treu, Maximi monachi Planudis epistulae (1890), p. 208.
