= Pietro Luigi M. Leone =

Italian Byzantinist and literary critic (1937–2023)

- Born: 16 May 1937; Pisticci, MT, Basilicata, Kingdom of Italy
- Died: November 29, 2023 (aged 86); Pisticci, MT, Basilicata, Italy
- Occupation: University professor
- Known for: Critical editions of John Tzetzes and Nicephorus Gregoras

Academic background
- Education: University of Naples Federico II
- Thesis: Ioannis Tzetzae Historiae
- Doctoral advisor: Vittorio De Falco

Academic work
- Discipline: Classics
- Sub-discipline: Byzantine studies
- Institutions: University of Lecce (1975–2010)

Pietro Luigi Martino Leone (16 May 1937 – 29 November 2023) was an Italian philologist and university professor, Emeritus of Byzantine studies of the University of Salento. He was a prolific textual critic and editor and a specialist in Byzantine literature.

== Biography ==
Born in Pisticci in the Matera province, Leone enrolled in the University of Naples and graduated in classics from there in the early 1960s, tutored by Vittorio De Falco. After some years of teaching at the "Emanuele Duni" high school in Matera, in his native Basilicata, he obtained an assistantship at the University of Naples; since 1975 he was Professor in Byzantine studies at the University of Salento, where he taught for the rest of his career. In 1980, he chaired the IV Italian Congress of Byzantine Studies (Lecce – Calimera) and edited the proceedings. In 1982 he chaired a congress in memory of Nicola Festa, held in Pisticci.

Leone retired from teaching in 2010 and was made Emeritus. He had one brother, Antonio "Nino", who served as master of the local middle school, and two sisters named Lidia and Silvia. He died in 2023 aged 86, in his native village. The civic museum of his native town has been named after him.

== Research activity ==
Leone was primarily a textual critic and an editor of unpublished (or badly published) Byzantine texts, and worked on texts written in the Byzantine learned language (the so-called Hochsprache). He unearthed new works by the rhetor and philosopher Nicephorus Gregoras (fl. 14th century) and published several prose works of the same: two speeches to the emperor Andronikos II Palaiologus, a speech to Hugh of Cyprus, philosophical dialogues and treatises against Barlaam of Seminara, hagiographical works – including his biography of the emperor Constantine the Great –, and his whole letters collection. He also wrote exegetical essays of some difficult passages of Gregoras' philosophical works.

The Byzantine author whom Leone studied the deepest and longest, however, was John Tzetzes (fl. 12th century). Leone provided the first modern edition of Tzetzes' most important works: the Historiae, an extensive commentary in verses on his own correspondence (of which he also studied the textual history, the manuscript tradition, the notes by the author himself, and various textual and exegetical aspects); the Letters themselves, which he published in the Teubner collection; the Carmina Iliaca, a re-telling of the Trojan War; and the Theogonia. Additionally, Leone published — often in editio princeps — other poems and minor works by Tzetzes. He also studied the manuscript tradition of Tzetzes' works and their fortune throughout the Byzantine millennium.

Leone edited the fictional epistles of Claudius Aelianus (fl. 2nd–3rd century), the letters of the Byzantine philologist Maximus Planudes and those of the Greek humanist Theodorus Gaza; he studied the Byzantine scholia to and the Byzantine paraphrases of the Alexandra by Lycophron (which he also critically edited), and studied the manuscript transmission of Johannes Zonaras' Epitome historiarum. In the 1970s, he revised the text of Aeschines' speeches – focusing on the papyri and their contributions – and published it with facing Italian translation for UTET.

A lesser part of his scholarship was dedicated to the 11th/12th-century judge and poet Michael Haploucheir, to the manuscript tradition of the minor works of George-Gregory of Cyprus (fl. 13th century), to the 14th century Byzantine statesman Nikephoros Choumnos, to Tryphiodorus (3rd or 4th century), to Stesichorus (6th century BC) and to the humanist Julius Pomponius Laetus. He also edited rhapsodies 1 and 22 of Homer's Iliad for a non-scholarly audience.

Belgian Byzantinist Alice Leroy-Molinghen once described his indefatigable research and scholarship as an "activité devourant" (a devouring activity).

== Works ==
The following bibliography is adapted and augmented from the list edited in the Festschrift in Leone's honor. Abbreviations follow the standards set by L'Année philologique, adding:

- ALF(Le): Annali della Facoltà di Lettere e di Filosofia. Lecce (various places and publishers; 1965–1980).
- ALF(Mc): Annali della Facoltà di Lettere e di Filosofia. Macerata (various places and publishers; 1968–2010).
- ALF(Na): Annali della Facoltà di Lettere e di Filosofia. Naples (Naples: various publishers; 1952–1980).
- RB: Rivista di Bizantinistica (Milan: CUSL; 1991–1994).
- RSBS: Rivista di Studi Bizantini e Slavi (Bologna: Patron; 1981–1983).

=== Monographs ===
- Aelianus, Cl. (1974). Leone, P. L. M. (ed.). Epistulae rusticae. Testi e Documenti per la Storia dell'Antichità, 43. Milan: Cisalpino-Goliardica.
- Aeschines (1977). "Orazioni". In Leone, P. L. M.; Malcovati, E.; Marzi, M. (eds.). Oratori attici minori. Vol. I. Turin: UTET. pp. 329–797.
- Gaza, Th. (1990). Leone, P. L. M. (ed.). Epistulae. Speculum, 12. Naples: D'Auria.
- Gregoras, N. (1975). Leone, P. L. M. (ed.). Fiorenzo o intorno alla sapienza. Byzantina et Neohellenica Neapolitana, 4. Naples: Università.
- Gregoras, N. (1982). Leone, P. L. M. (ed.). Epistulae. Vol. II: Epistulae. Galatina: Congedo.
- Gregoras, N. (1983). Leone, P. L. M. (ed.). Epistulae. Vol. I: Prolegomena et indices. Galatina: Congedo.
- Gregoras, N. (1994). Leone, P. L. M. (ed.). Vita Constantini. Studi e testi dei «Quaderni Catanesi», 1. Catania: CULC. OCLC 848655896.
- Homer (1969a). Leone, P. L. M. (ed.). Iliade. Canto I. Turin: Paravia.
- Homer (1969b). Leone, P. L. M. (ed.). Iliade. Canto XXII. Turin: Paravia.
- Leone, P. L. M., ed. (1983). Studi Bizantini e Neogreci. Atti del IV Congresso Nazionale di Studi Bizantini (Lecce, 21–23 aprile 1980; Calimera, 24 aprile 1980). Saggi e Ricerche, 3. Galatina: Congedo. ISBN 8877862203.
- Planudes, M. (1991). Leone, P. L. M. (ed.). Epistulae. Classical and Byzantine Monographs, 18. Amsterdam: Hakkert. ISBN 9789025609368. ISSN 1381-2955.
- Leone, P. L. M., ed. (2002). Scholia vetera et paraphrases in Lycophronis Alexandram. Galatina: Congedo. ISBN 8880864262.
- Tzetzes, I. (1968). Leone, P. L. M. (ed.). Historiae. Naples: Libreria Scientifica Editrice.
- Tzetzes, I. (1972). Leone, P. L. M. (ed.). Epistulae. Bibliotheca Teubneriana. Leipzig: B. G. Teubner.
- Tzetzes, I. (1995). Leone, P. L. M. (ed.). Carmina Iliaca. Studi e testi dei «Quaderni Catanesi», 2. Catania: CULC.
- Tzetzes, I. (2007). Leone, P. L. M. (ed.). Historiae (2nd ed.). Galatina: Congedo. ISBN 9788880867548.
- Tzetzes, I. (2015). Leone, P. L. M. (ed.). La leggenda troiana (Carmina Iliaca). Satura, 15. Lecce: Pensa MultiMedia. ISBN 9788867603145.
- Tzetzes, I. (2019). Leone, P. L. M. (ed.). Theogonia. Quaderni di «Satura», 2. Lecce: Pensa MultiMedia. ISBN 9788867606658.

=== Articles ===
- Leone, P. L. M. (1961). "Prolegomena ad Io. Tzetzae Historias". BZ (in Latin). 54 (2): 266–285. doi:10.1515/byzs.1961.54.2.266.
- Leone, P. L. M. (1963a). "Gli scolii alle Historiae di Giovanni Tzetzes". SIFC. 24 (2): 190–229.
- Leone, P. L. M. (1963b). "Significato e limiti della revisione delle Historiae di Giovanni Tzetzes". Aevum. 37 (3/4): 239–248. JSTOR 20859618.
- Leone, P. L. M. (1964–1965). "Excerpta Vaticana ex Io. Tzetzae Commentario in Lycophronem et Historiis". AAT (in Latin). 99: 381–488.
- Leone, P. L. M. (1965). "Tzetziana". In Bruno, G. (ed.). I cento anni del liceo "Duni" di Matera: studi e testimonianze. Fasano: Schena. pp. 221–229.
- Leone, P. L. M. (1967). "Per una edizione critica delle Historiae di Giovanni Tzetzes". BPEC. N. S. 15: 99–107.
- Leone, P. L. M. (1968a). "La Palinodia di Stesicoro". ALF(Na). 11: 5–28.
- Leone, P. L. M. (1968b). "La Presa di Troia di Trifiodoro". Vichiana. 5: 59–108.
- Leone, P. L. M. (1969). "Michaelis Hapluchiris versus cum excerptis". Byzantion (in Latin). 39: 251–283. JSTOR 44169955.
- Leone, P. L. M. (1970). "Nicephori Gregorae "Antilogia" et "Solutiones quaestionum"". Byzantion (in Latin). 40 (2): 471–516. JSTOR 44171217.
- Leone, P. L. M. (1970–1971). "Ioannis Tzetzae Iambi". RSBN (in Latin). 6–7: 127–157.
- Leone, P. L. M. (1971). "Nicephori Gregorae ad imperatorem Andronicum II Palaeologum orationes". Byzantion (in Latin). 41: 497–519. JSTOR 44170325.
- Leone, P. L. M. (1971–1972). "Il Φιλομαθὴς ἢ περὶ ὑβριστῶν di Niceforo Gregora". RSBN. 8–9: 171–201.
- Leone, P. L. M. (1972). "Un'epistola di Nicola Pepagomeno a Niceforo Gregora". Byzantion. 42 (2): 523–531. JSTOR 44170369.
- Leone, P. L. M. (1972–1973). "Nicephori Gregorae opuscula nunc primum edita". ALF(Mc) (in Latin). 3–4 (2): 731–782.
- Leone, P. L. M. (1973). "A proposito di una lettera del protonotario Nicola Lampeno a Niceforo Gregora". Byzantion. 43 (2): 344–359. JSTOR 44171246.
- Leone, P. L. M. (1973–1974a). "Appunti per la storia del testo di Eschine". ALF(Mc). 5–6: 11–43.
- Leone, P. L. M. (1973–1974b). "Le epistole di Niceforo Choumno nel cod. Ambros. gr. C 71 sup". EEBS. 39–40: 75–95.
- Leone, P. L. M. (1975a). "Alcuni appunti sul Florentios di Niceforo Gregora". Byzantino-Sicula. 2: 335–345.
- Leone, P. L. M. (1975b). "Appunti e note su alcuni opuscoli di Niceforo Gregora". Nicolaus. 3 (2): 319–341.
- Leone, P. L. M. (1975c). "Sulle Epistulae rusticae di Claudio Eliano". ALF(Mc). 8: 45–64.
- Leone, P. L. M. (1976a). "Le Lettere rustiche di Claudio Eliano". ALF(Le). 7: 55–74.
- Leone, P. L. M. (1976b). "Per l'edizione critica dell'epistolario di Niceforo Gregora". Byzantion. 46 (1): 13–47. JSTOR 44170484.
- Leone, P. L. M. (1980). "La corrispondenza di Niceforo Gregora". Quaderni del Syculorum Gymnasium. 8: 183–232.
- Leone, P. L. M. (1981a). "Barlaam in Occidente". Studi in onore di M. Marti. Vol. I. Galatina: Congedo. pp. 427–476.
- Leone, P. L. M. (1981b). "L'encomio di Niceforo Gregora per il re di Cipro (Ugo IV di Lusignano)". Byzantion. 51 (1): 211–224. JSTOR 44170679.
- Leone, P. L. M. (1983a). "Il Dramation di Michele Hapluchir". Studi in onore di D. Adamesteanu. Galatina: Congedo. pp. 228–238.
- Leone, P. L. M. (1983b). "La Vita Antonii Cauleae di Niceforo Gregora". Nicolaus. 11 (1): 3–50.
- Leone, P. L. M. (1983c). "La patria di Giulio Pomponio Leto". Annali del Dipartimento di Scienze Storiche e Sociali (Università di Lecce). 2: 129–136.
- Leone, P. L. M. (1983d). "Per una nuova edizione critica delle Epistole di Massimo Planude (III)". RSBS. 3: 81–93.
- Leone, P. L. M. (1984a). "I Carmina Iliaca di Giovanni Tzetzes". QC. 6 (12): 377–405.
- Leone, P. L. M. (1984b). "Ancora sulla Presa di Troia di Trifiodoro". QC. 6 (13): 5–15.
- Leone, P. L. M. (1984c). "Note sulle fonti dei ΤΡΩΙΚΑ". Ἀθηνᾶ. 69: 213–217.
- Leone, P. L. M. (1984d). "Noterelle Tzetziane". Lirica greca da Archiloco a Elitis. Studi in onore di F. M. Pontani. Padova: Liviana. pp. 249–258.
- Leone, P. L. M. (1984e). "Per una nuova edizione critica delle Epistole di Massimo Planude (I)". Byzantion. 54 (1): 193–219. JSTOR 44170325.
- Leone, P. L. M. (1984f). "Per una nuova edizione critica delle Epistole di Massimo Planude (IV)". Ἀθηνᾶ. 69: 195–211.
- Leone, P. L. M. (1984g). "Sulla tradizione manoscritta dei Carmina Iliaca di Giovanni Tzetzes". Orpheus. 5: 357–381.
- Leone, P. L. M. (1985a). "La patria di Giulio Pomponio Leto". Nuovi Orientamenti. 94: 37–44.
- Leone, P. L. M. (1985b). "Ancora sulla patria di Giulio Pomponio Leto". Nuovi Orientamenti. 95: 43–45.
- Leone, P. L. M. (1985c). "Noterelle Tzetziane (II)". QC. 7 (14): 286–292.
- Leone, P. L. M. (1985d). "Noterelle Tzetziane (III)". QC. 7 (14): 293–309.
- Leone, P. L. M. (1985e). "Sulla tradizione manoscritta dei Carmina Iliaca di Giovanni Tzetzes (III)". Βυζαντινά. 13 (2): 773–776.
- Leone, P. L. M. (1985f). "Un "documento" su Antonio Acciaiuoli e Maria (Melissena) nel cod. Barocc. gr. 194". QC. 7 (13): 5–9.
- Leone, P. L. M. (1986a). "Due opuscoli di Giorgio di Cipro nel cod. Laur. gr. Plut. LVI 3". QC. 8 (15): 58–62.
- Leone, P. L. M. (1986b). "Gli Pseudo-Phocylidea nel cod. Paris. Suppl. gr. 915". Scritti in onore di Giuseppe Codacci Pisanelli. Milano: Giuffré. pp. 261–264. ISBN 8814008132.
- Leone, P. L. M. (1986c). "Su due letterati pisticcesi del sec. XVI". Nuovi Orientamenti. 97: 33–42.
- Leone, P. L. M. (1986d). "Sulla tradizione manoscritta dei Carmina Iliaca di Giovanni Tzetzes (I)". Studi albanologici, balcanici, bizantini e orientali in onore di Giuseppe Valentini, S.J. Studi Albanesi. Studi e Testi, 6. Firenze: L. S. Olschki. pp. 295–346. ISBN 9788822233905.
- Leone, P. L. M. (1987a). "La Passio sancti Codrati di Niceforo Gregora". EEBS. 47: 275–294.
- Leone, P. L. M. (1987b). "Nota su alcune lettere di Teodoro Gaza". QC. 9 (18): 425–430.
- Leone, P. L. M. (1987c). "Su alcune lettere di Teodoro Gaza (nota cronologica)". QC. 9 (18): 437–442.
- Leone, P. L. M. (1987d). "Sulla corrispondenza di Teodoro Gaza". QC. 9 (18): 443–449.
- Leone, P. L. M. (1987e). "Teodoro Gaza in Calabria". QC. 9 (18): 419–423.
- Leone, P. L. M. (1988). "Per una nuova edizione critica delle Epistole di Massimo Planude (II)". Orpheus. 9: 102–108.
- Leone, P. L. M. (1989a). "Appunti su Teodoro Gaza". QC. 1: 59–78.
- Leone, P. L. M. (1989b). "L'Encomium in Patriarcham Antonium II Cauelam del filosofo e retore Niceforo". Orpheus. 10: 404–429.
- Leone, P. L. M. (1989c). "Sulla tradizione manoscritta dei Carmina Iliaca di Giovanni Tzetzes (II)". Ἀθηνᾶ. 80: 197–219.
- Leone, P. L. M. (1991a). "La tradizione manoscritta degli scholia in Lycophronem (I)". QC (in Latin). 3: 33–76.
- Leone, P. L. M. (1991b). "Nicephori Gregorae de Sanctissimae Deiparae nativitate praesentatione atque educatione oratio". QC (in Latin). 3: 1–31.
- Leone, P. L. M. (1991c). "Noterelle Tzetziane (IV)". RB. 1 (2): 23–28.
- Leone, P. L. M. (1991d). "Sull'Hypomnema in S. Luciam di Giovanni Tzetzes". RB. 1 (2): 17–21.
- Leone, P. L. M. (1991e). "Un'epitome dei Carmina Iliaca di Giovanni Tzetzes". RB. 1 (2): 11–16.
- Leone, P. L. M. (1992). "Le lettere di Teodoro Gaza". In Cortesi, M.; Maltese, E. V. (eds.). Dotti bizantini e libri greci del secolo XV. Atti del convegno Internationale, Trento, 22–23 ottobre 1990. Napoli: D'Auria. pp. 201–218. ISBN 9788870920864.
- Leone, P. L. M. (1992–1993a). "La tradizione manoscritta degli scholia in Lycophronem (II)". QC. 4–5: 45–58.
- Leone, P. L. M. (1992–1993b). "Miscellanea critica (I)". QC. 4–5: 61–70.
- Leone, P. L. M. (1994a). "In margine al Concilio: a proposito di una lettera di Teodoro Gaza". In Viti, P. (ed.). Firenze e il concilio del 1439. Convegno di studi, Firenze, 29 novembre – 2 dicembre 1989. Vol. II. Firenze: L. S. Olschki. pp. 921–929. ISBN 9788822241627.
- Leone, P. L. M. (1994b). "La technologia attribuita a Niceforo Gregora nel cod. Papiensis (Bibl. Univ.) gr. 363". Orpheus. 15: 157–160.
- Leone, P. L. M. (1994c). "La tradizione manoscritta dell'Epitome historiarum di G. Zonaras (I)". Σύνδεσμος. Studi in onore di Rosario Anastasi. Catania: Istituto di Studi Bizantini e Neoellenici. pp. 221–262. OCLC 31141096.
- Leone, P. L. M. (1995). "L'epitome tomana dei Persiani di Eschilo". Scritti in onore di A. D'Addario. Vol. II. Lecce: Conte. pp. 347–351. ISBN 8885979580.
- Leone, P. L. M. (2002). "La tradizione manoscritta degli scholia in Lycophronem (III)". QC-SAM. 1: 95–122.
- Leone, P. L. M. (2003a). "La tradizione manoscritta degli scholia in Lycophronem (IV)". QC-SAM. 2: 101–121.
- Leone, P. L. M. (2003b). "La tradizione manoscritta degli scholia in Lycophronem (V)". QC-SAM. 2: 123–150.
- Leone, P. L. M. (2003c). "Miscellanea critica (II)". SOC. 7: 39–47.
- Leone, P. L. M. (2004a). "La tradizione manoscritta degli scholia in Lycophronem (VI)". SOC. 8: 5–22.
- Leone, P. L. M. (2004b). "Miscellanea critica (III)". In Febronia, E. (ed.). Politica retorica e simbolismo del primato: Roma e Costantinopoli, secoli IV-VII. Atti del Convegno internazionale, Catania, 4–7 ottobre 2001: omaggio a R. Soraci. Vol. II. Catania: CULC. pp. 347–351. ISBN 8885979580.
- Leone, P. L. M. (2007a). "Noterelle tzetziane (V)". QC-SAM. 6: 19–27.
- Leone, P. L. M. (2007b). "Miscellanea critica (IV)". QC-SAM. 6: 29–34.
- Leone, P. L. M. (2007–2008). "La tradizione manoscritta degli scholia in Lycophronem (VII)". QC-SAM. 6–7: 5–18.
- Leone, P. L. M. (2019). "Noterelle Tzetziane (VI)". SOC. 23 (2): 125–133.

== Festschrift ==
- Vox, O.; Laudizi, G., eds. (2009). Satura Rudina: studi in onore di Pietro Luigi Leone. Lecce: Pensa MultiMedia. ISBN 9788882326777.

== Bibliography ==
- Benvenuto, C. N. (2025). "Studi bizantini in Basilicata". In Bianchi, N.; Benvenuto, C. N.; Monno, P. (eds.). La biblioteca ritrovata: I libri di Nicola Festa (1866–1940) e altre storie di libri in mostra. Bari: Università. pp. XLV–XLVII. ISBN 978-88-6629-097-1.
- Coniglio, G. (7 December 2023). "Un ricordo del prof. Pietro Luigi Leone. Il noto filologo merita una via". pisticci.com (in Italian).
- Follieri, E. (1997). "La filologia bizantina in Italia nel secolo XX". In Acconcia Longo, A.; Perria, L.; Luzzi, A. (eds.). Byzantina et Italograeca. Studi di filologia e di paleografia. Raccolta di Studi e Testi, 195. Rome: Edizioni di Storia e Letteratura. pp. 3–39. ISBN 9788890013843.
- Garzya, A. (1980). "Vittorio de Falco". Gnomon. 52 (5): 505–506. JSTOR 27687583.
- Garzya, A. (1983). "Commemorazione di Vittorio de Falco". In Leone, P. L. M. (ed.). Studi Bizantini e Neogreci. Atti del IV Congresso Nazionale di Studi Bizantini (Lecce, 21–23 aprile 1980; Calimera, 24 aprile 1980). Galatina: Congedo. pp. 43–49. ISBN 9788877862204.
- Giannachi, F. G. (14 February 2024). 9giornatalinguaellenica (Video) (in Italian). 3:10:15 minutes in – via YouTube.com.
- Leroy-Molenghin, A. (1977). "Le Florentios de Nicéphore Grégoras". Byzantion. 77: 533–535. JSTOR 44170531.
- Martina, F. (13 June 2025). "Dedicato a Pietro Leone il Museo Civico di Pisticci". Giornalemio.it (in Italian).
- Puglia, E. (2013). "Vittorio de Falco (1898–1980)". In Capasso, M. (ed.). Hermae. Scholars and Scholarship in Papyrology. Vol. III. Pisa – Roma: Fabrizio Serra. pp. 83–85. ISBN 9788862276184.
- Rhoby, A. (2023). "Corpus Fontium Historiae Byzantinae: Stand der Publikationen (Dezember 2023)". Jahrbuch der österreichischen Byzantinistik. 73: 335–339. doi:10.1553/joeb73s335.
