= Maximus Planudes =

Byzantine scholar (c. 1260 – c. 1305)

Byzantine Empire Ambassador to the Republic of Venice
- In office 1295–1296

Personal details
- Born: c. 1260 Nicomedia, Bithynia (modern-day İzmit, Kocaeli, Turkey)
- Died: c. 1305 Constantinople, Byzantine Empire (modern-day Istanbul, Turkey
- Occupation: Ambassador, monk, scholar, anthologist, translator, mathematician, grammarian and theologian

Academic background
- Academic advisor: George Pachymeres

Academic work
- Notable students: Manuel Bryennios

Maximus Planudes (Ancient Greek: Μάξιμος Πλανούδης, Máximos Planoúdēs; c. 1260 – c. 1305 (Note: Older sources give 1330; the transliteration varies; the Oxford Classical Dictionary (2009) uses Planudes.)) was a Byzantine Greek monk, scholar, anthologist, translator, mathematician, grammarian and theologian at Constantinople. Through his translations from Latin into Greek and from Greek into Latin, he brought the Greek East and the Latin West into closer contact with one another. He is now best known as a compiler of the Greek Anthology.

== Biography ==
Maximus Planudes lived during the reigns of the Byzantine emperors Michael VIII and Andronikos II. He was born at Nicomedia in Bithynia in 1260, but the greater part of his life was spent in Constantinople, where as a monk he devoted himself to study and teaching. On entering the monastery he changed his original name Manuel to Maximus.

Planudes possessed a knowledge of Latin remarkable at a time when Rome and Italy were regarded with some hostility by the Greeks of the Byzantine Empire. To this accomplishment he probably owed his selection as one of the ambassadors sent by emperor Andronikos II in 1295–96 to remonstrate with the Venetians for their attack upon the Genoese settlement in Galata near Constantinople. A more important result was that Planudes, especially by his translations, paved the way for the revival of the study of Greek language and literature in western Europe.

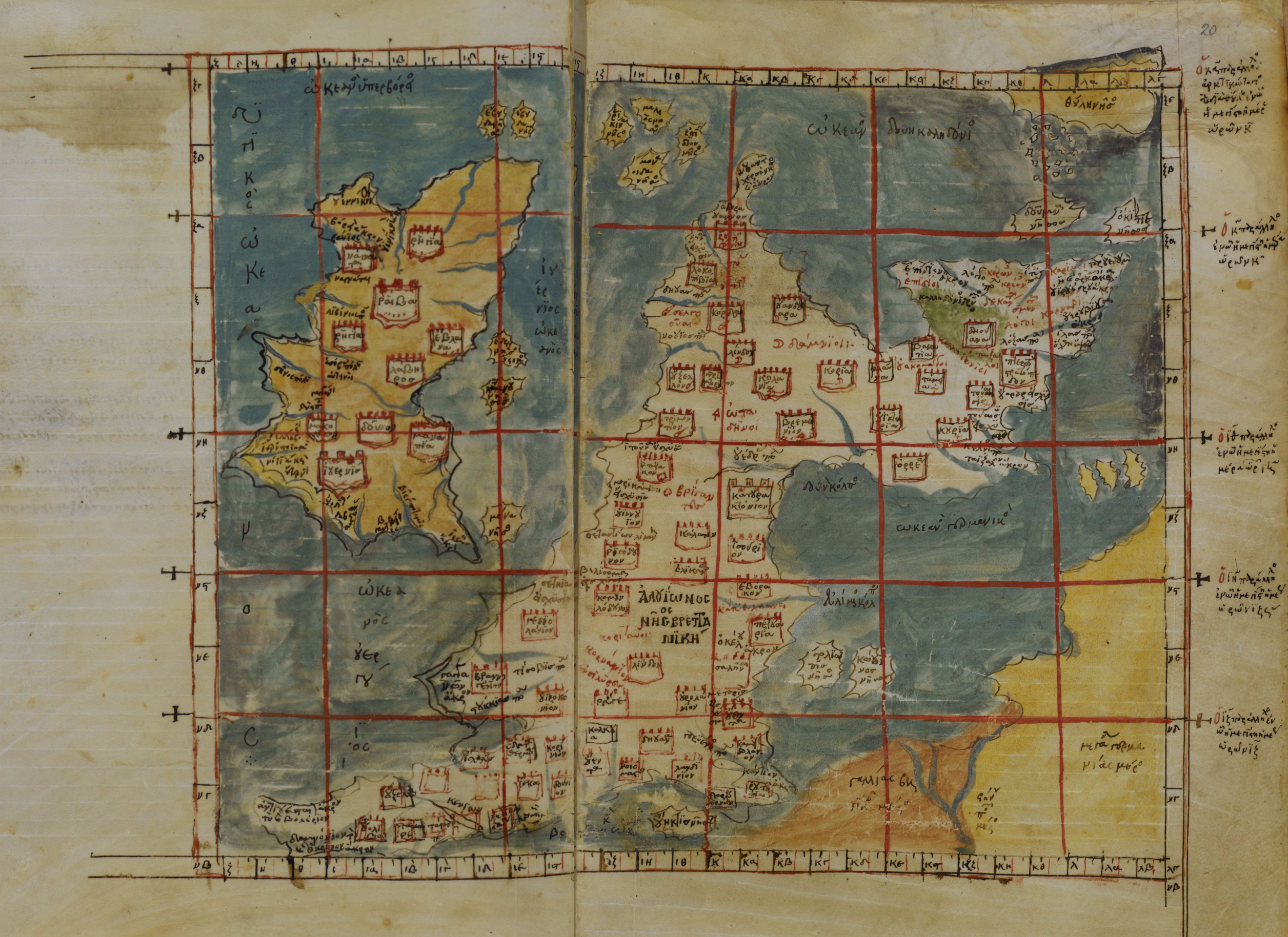
The early-14th century map of the British Isles from the Codex Vatopedinus 655, sometimes associated with Planudes.

He was the author of numerous works, including: a Greek grammar in the form of question and answer, like the Erotemata of Manuel Moschopulus, with an appendix on the so-called "political verse"; a treatise on syntax; a biography of Aesop and a prose version of the fables; scholia on certain Greek authors; two hexameter poems, one a eulogy of Claudius Ptolemaeus—whose Geography was rediscovered by Planudes, who translated it into Latin—the other an account of the sudden change of an ox into a mouse; a treatise on the method of calculating in use amongst the Indians; and scholia to the first two books of the Arithmetic of Diophantus.

His numerous translations from the Latin included Cicero's Somnium Scipionis with the commentary of Macrobius; Ovid's Heroides and Metamorphoses; Boethius' De consolatione philosophiae; and Augustine's De trinitate. Traditionally, a translation of Julius Caesar's De Bello Gallico has been attributed to Planudes, but this is a much repeated mistake. These translations were not only useful to Greek speakers but were also widely used in western Europe as textbooks for the study of Greek.

It is, however, for his edition of the Greek Anthology that he is best known. This edition, the Anthology of Planudes or Planudean Anthology, is shorter than the Heidelberg text (the Palatine Anthology), and largely overlaps it, but contains 380 epigrams not present in it, normally published with the others, either as a sixteenth book or as an appendix.

J. W. Mackail in his book Select Epigrams from the Greek Anthology, has this to add of him:

Among his works were translations into Greek of Augustine's City of God and Caesar's Gallic War [sic]. The restored Greek Empire of the Palaeologi was then fast dropping to pieces. The Genoese colony of Pera usurped the trade of Constantinople and acted as an independent state; and it brings us very near the modern world to remember that Planudes was the contemporary of Petrarch.

He is recorded as one of the first people to use the word "million".

== Ptolemy's Geography ==
According to Berggren & Jones (2000) and Mittenhuber (2010) many of the extant manuscripts of Ptolemy's Geography can be connected with the activities of Planudes. Within the stemma, manuscript groups UKFN and RVWC both descend from a recension by Planudes; only manuscript X (Vat.gr.191) is independent.

Regarding Planudes' work in rediscovering the Geography, a 47-line hexameter poem of his survives on the work. The summary of the poem by Berggen & Jones (2010) is as follows:

"What a great wonder, the way that Ptolemy has brought the whole world into view, just like someone making a map showing just a little city. I never saw anything so skillful, colorful, and elegant as this lovely geographia. This work lay hidden for countless years and found no one to bring it to light. But the emperor Andronikos exhorted the bishop of Alexandria, who took great troubles that a certain free-spirited friend of the Byzantines should restore a likeness of the picture worthy of a king."

== Sources ==
- Editions include: Fabricius, Bibliotheca graeca, ed. Harles, xi. 682; theological writings in Migne, Patrologia Graeca, cxlvii; correspondence, ed. M Treu (1890), with a valuable commentary
- Douglas, A. & Cameron, E. (2009). "Anthology". In S. Hornblower & A. Spawforth (eds.). The Oxford Classical Dictionary. Oxford University Press. (Also Oxford Reference Online.)
- Fisher, E. A. (1991). "Planoudes, Maximos". In A. P. Kazhdan (ed.). The Oxford Dictionary of Byzantium. Oxford University press. (Also Oxford Reference Online.)
- P. L. M. Leone (ed.), Maximi Planudis epistolae, Amsterdam (1991).
- K. Krumbacher, Geschichte der byzantinischen Litteratur (1897)
- J. E. Sandys, History of Classical Scholarship (1906), vol. i
