= Nino Herman =

Israeli art-photographer (born 1952)

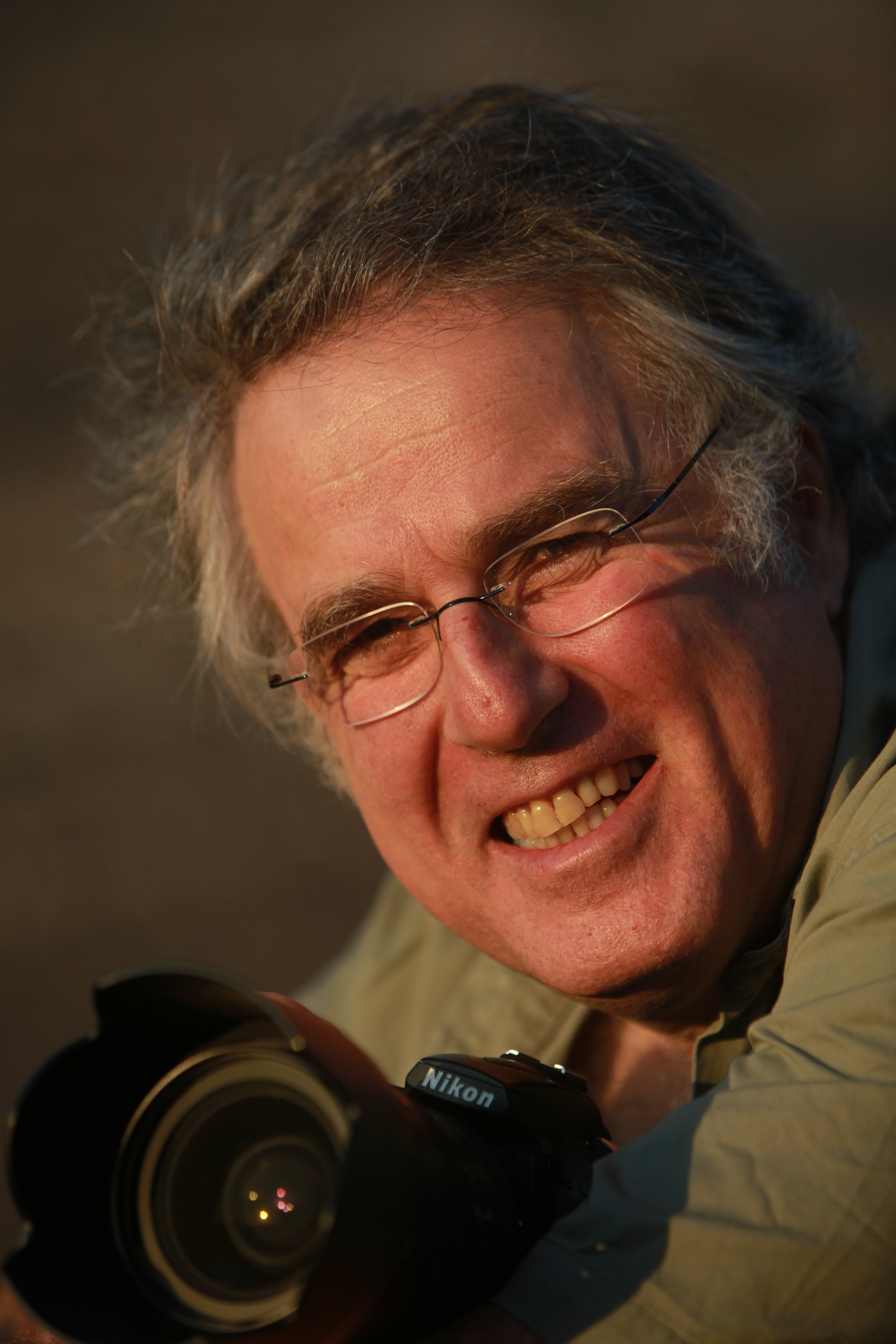
Herman

Nino (Chananya) Herman (Hebrew: נינו (חנניה) הרמן; born 1952) is an Israeli art-photographer.

== Biography ==
Nino Herman was born in Tel Aviv, and raised in Ramat Gan from the age of four. His father Gaby (Gabriel) Herman, was among the founders of Kibbutz Ein Gev. His mother, Lore Herman, was born in Berlin. After the Nazi takeover, her family fled to the Netherlands. In World War II, after her twin brother Heini was murdered in Mauthausen, the family went into hiding in Amsterdam. Lore was active in the Dutch resistance movement. After World War II, Herman's parents met in Amsterdam and made "Aliyah". In Israel, Lore began painting. He has an older sister, Judith. At the age of two, Nino became affected by poliomyelitis and the disease left him handicapped. Herman's paternal grandfather, Dr. Yehuda Hugo Herrmann (1887-1940), born in Mährisch-Trübau (Moravská Třebová), was one of the leaders of the Bar Kochva organization. He was editor of the "Selbstwehr" and "Jüdische Rundschau" and worked with Shmuel Yosef Agnon on the Passover-book "Chad Gadya" (1914) and the Hanukkah-book "Maoz Tzur" (1918). He immigrated to Palestine in 1934 and settled in Jerusalem.

His maternal grandfather, Erich Pintus, was one of the directors of the Shell Oil Company in Germany.

== Photography career ==
At the age of 17, Herman began to work as assistant at the photo-studio of Ephraim Kidron in Tel Aviv (1969-1971).

He also worked as freelance photographer for newspapers, for "Olam HaKolnoa", together with the journalist G. Itor (1971-1973).

In 1973–1974, Herman worked in Tel Aviv as photographer on behalf of the Government Press Office. Together with photographers Shaya Segal and Shmuel Rachmani, he founded the Photo-Agency 24+, providing pictures to the Maariv newspaper (1974-1977). He worked on behalf of Maariv as news and feature photographer, and later as photographer at the Jerusalemite edition of the newspaper. Together with the photographer Eli Hershkowitz he founded the photo-agency "Zoom 77" which provided pictures to Yedioth Ahronoth, Associated Press, and Time Magazine (1977-1979).

Between 1979 and 1986, Herman was back at the Government Press Office. He provided photographic coverage of the peace treaty between Israel and Egypt, and accompanied Israeli Prime Ministers Menachem Begin, Yitzhak Shamir, and Shimon Peres in their trips in Israel and abroad.

Herman's pictures, from the archives of the Government Press Office and of the Maariv newspaper, appeared in official brochures, in books and in various group exhibitions. In 1979, Herman married Tchiya, in 1981 they were among the founders of Nataf, a small community-village on the hills of Judea, and went to live there. They had three children.

In 1987–1998, Herman worked as pictures editor at the Maariv news desk. After an accident that left him injured, he quit this job. In 2000 his son Yair, who served as photographer in the IDF, was killed in a road accident, and Nino stopped photographing.

In 2009 he came back, as art photographer, specialized also in snapshots of people.

Ronit Tzur, the curator of the exhibition "Tel Aviv – Berlin in transition", wrote: "In dozens of snapshots taken of ordinary people on the street, and of various ethnic groups, he draws a map of Tel Aviv South. His approach with sensitivity, and full respect for every individual, enables Nino to produce a sort of authentic and credible documentary. His camera catches sidewalk scenes and captures the atmosphere of the city whose life flows on streets and in coffee shops."

Herman pictures also nature, his recent collection "Outside my window", shown in the framework of "Daily Images" in August 2015 at the "Erev Rav" site, entertains a dialogue with painting.

In 2000–2012, Herman was art advisor at "Set Productions" for the movies of Dan Setton, the winner of the Emmy Award.

His writings and pictures appear in the "Grand angle" blog 2011–2013, in Maariv nrg "Wind objective", in "Photographs on site, and "second opinion". Since 2009 he keeps a personal picture blog, "Domains of the heart".

He is a member of the cooperative Gallery "A place for Art", at Kiriat Hamelacha, Tel Aviv South.

In 2016 he exhibits solo exhibition at the Laurie M. Tisch Gallery at JCC Manhattan in New York.

== Gallery ==
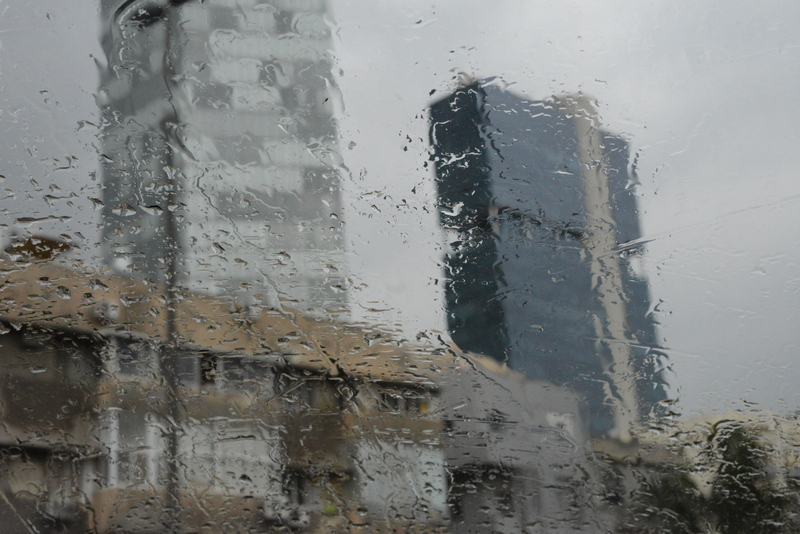
Urban view, The rain series, 2015

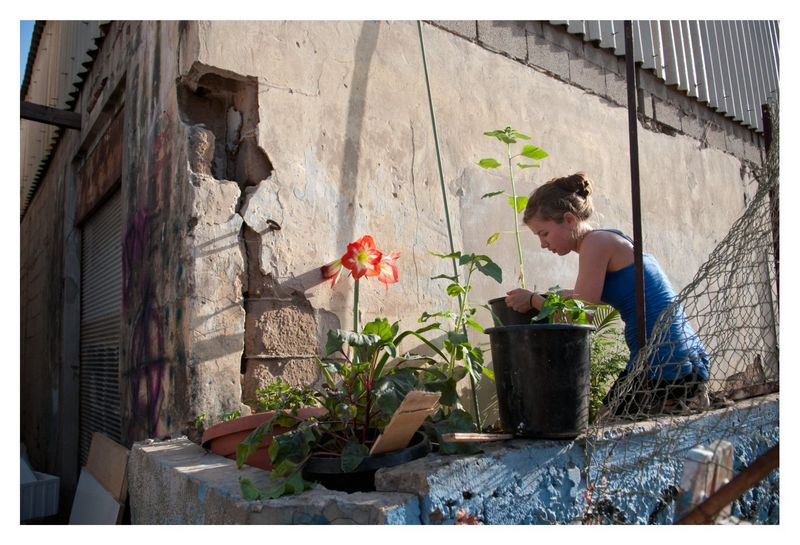
Gardening in the city, Florentin, 2013

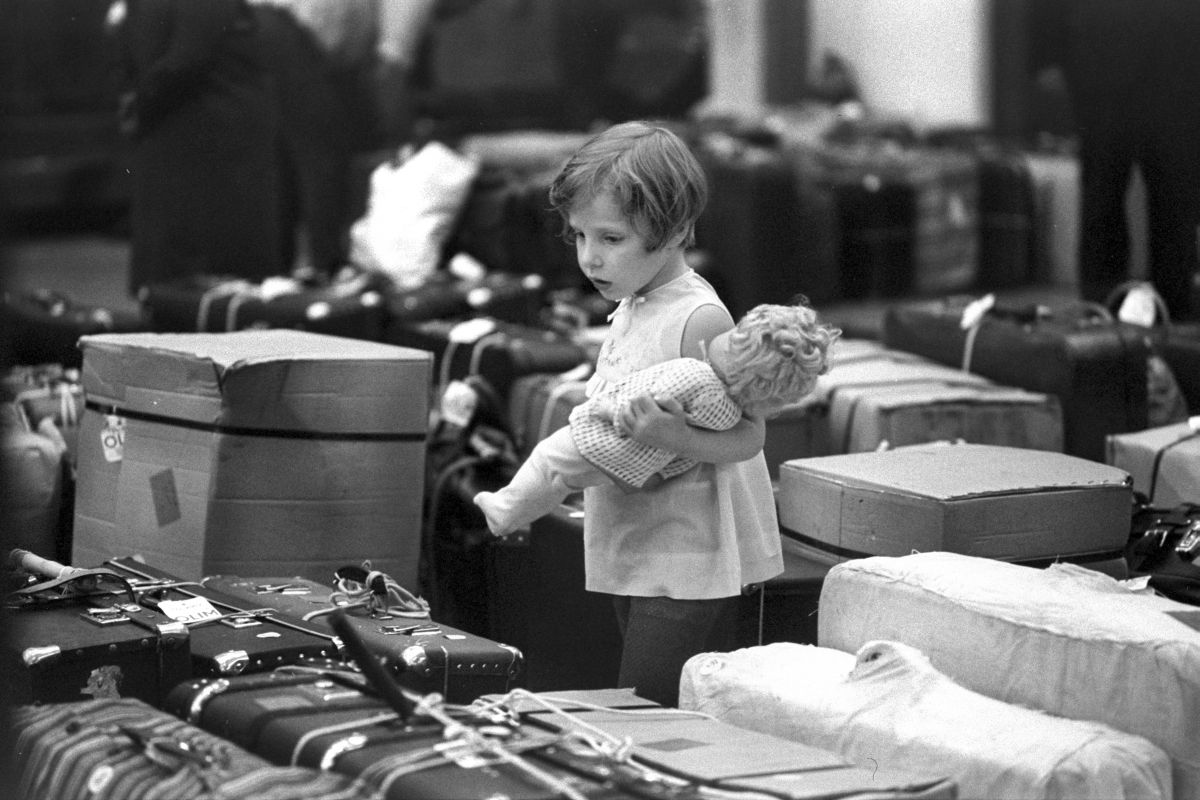
Immigration: a child with a doll in Ben Gurion Airport, 1973

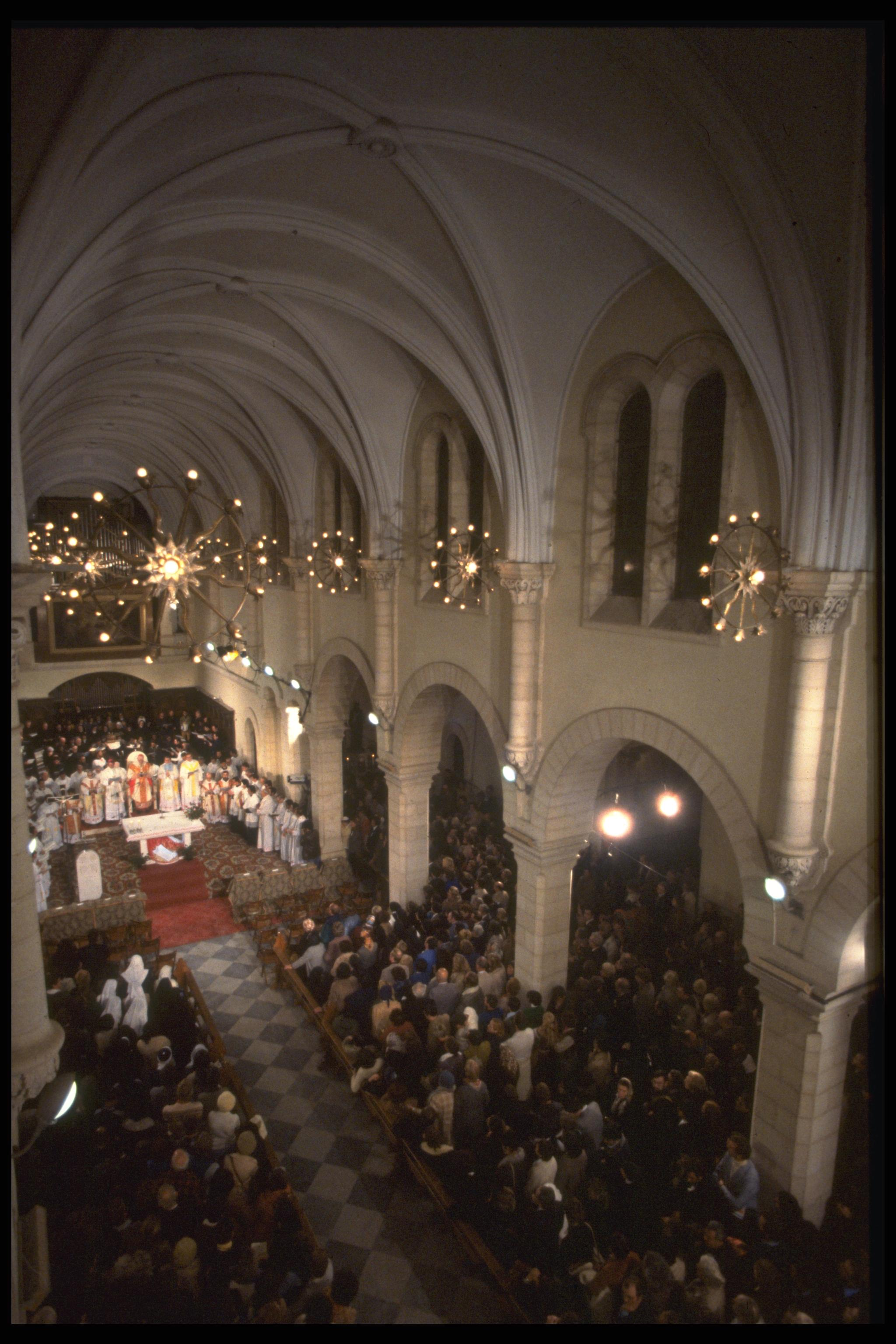

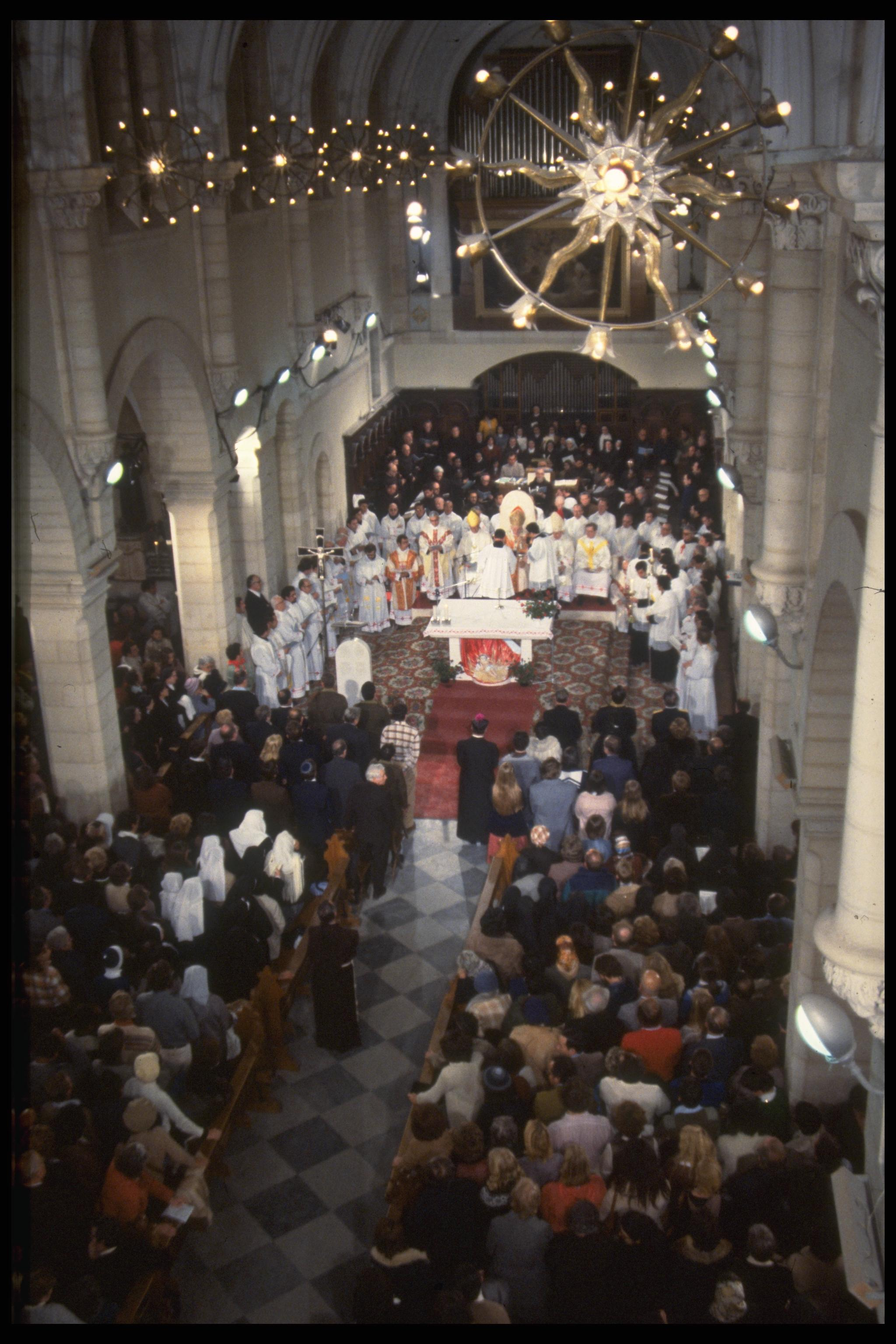

== Solo exhibitions ==
- 2009 "Anita Ice Parlor", moments for everyone, curator Tchiya Herrmann, advisor Joel Florentin
- 2011 "Movie images II", Tel Aviv Cinematheque, curator Tchiya Herrmann, advisor Udi Rosnoin
- 2011 "Between Nataf and Florentin", Eretz Israel Museum, Tel Aviv, curator Joel Kantor
- 2012 "Not a private name", Hebrew Culture House, curator Yael Kotler Kalderon
- 2012 "Movie images", Jerusalem Cinemateque, curator Tchiya Herrmann
- 2013 "Echos" at Bar Kayma Tel Aviv, curator Tchiya Herrmann
- 2014 "Naan photo paper" at Kibbutz Gallery, curators Hamutal Friedberg and Dorit Kopit
- 2016 "Bamakom. The photography of Nino Herman", The Laurie M. Tisch gallery, New York
- 2017 "Passer-by", Artist's House, Rishon Le Zion, curator: Jennifer Bloch.
- 2017 Artist wall - Nino Herman in "Photosophia" by Pierre Poulain", studio gallery, curator: Shuki Kook
- 2017 "Notes from Tel Aviv", Jewish community centre of Kraków", curator: Tamar Eisen Goldstein
- 2018 "BAMAKOM (in the Place) Photographs of Israel Spanning Four Decades by Nino Herman", PJCC Art Gallery, Osher Marin, Kurland Stairwell Gallery, San Francisco.
- 2019/20 - "City/Village", Artspace Tel Aviv, curator: Nir Harmat.
- 2021 - "Open space", Beit Daniel, curator: Yahel Sachs.
- 2024 - "Know This, Fragile Time", Artspace Tel Aviv.

== Group exhibitions ==
- 2013 "Tel Aviv – Berlin in transition", "Beit Bebyamini", curator Ronit Zor
- 2013 A bridge to the invisible the New Akropolis, Tel Aviv, curator Ira Bess
- 2013 "Nothing" the Artists House Rishon LeZion, curators Jenifer Bloch, Chen Balili, Rafy Carmel, Ester Shoshani
- 2013 Exhibition at Bank HaPoalim, the Organization for prevention of HIV, curators Li Mor, Cohen
- 2014 "Timeout" the Zadik Gallery Jaffa, curators Yaira Jasmin and Tsipi Menashe
- 2014 The prime Minister in slippers, at the Knesset, curator Avi Ohajon
- 2014 Art About – Israeli Worldwide Exhibition, Jewish Art exhibition, Munich, curator Li-Mor Cohen
- 2015 "Bastards" differences as creative process, at Open from Aleph Gallery, curator Kobi Carmi
- 2015 "Bread and Roses" exhibition and sale, at the Shenkar College of Engineering and Design
- 2016 "Tel Aviv, Berlin, in transit", Benyamini Contemporary Ceramics Center, curator: Ronit Zur
- 2016 "Bar Kochba – the historical memory and the myth of a hero, Eretz Israel Museum, curator Sara Tur-El
- 2016 "100th birthday" Yitzhak Shamir with a steel pencil, the Menachem Begin Memorial Centre and Prime Minister's office
- 2016 "C / ABC, Landscape in three parts", Benjamin Gallery, curator Sivan Feinsilber and Tamar Eisen
- 2016 "Homeland, MIgdal Ziv, Ramat HaChayal, curators Etty Fabian and Orit Kimmel
- 2016 "9 X Artist Wall", Artspace Tel Aviv
- 2017 "Dayan family album 1908-2017", Sturman house, curator Guy Raz.
- 2017 “Until She Did Not Know” (Ad lo Yadaa), Ben-Ami Gallery, Tel-Aviv, curator: Johanan Herson.
- 2017 "Reflection", Modi'in-Maccabim-Re'ut artist's house, curators: Gabi Yair, Nava Ron
- 2018 "I to Eye", Israel Museum, Curator: Shir Meller-Yamaguchi.
- 2018 "70 Artists celebrating 70 years for Israel!", Three Rivers Art Project, NY.
- 2018 "Late Blooming", Avraham hostel, Tel Aviv, curator: Dafna Abulafia.
- 2018 "Lost Landscapes and Hidden Maps", Nahum Gutman Museum of Art, Tel Aviv, curator: Monica Lavi.
- 2018 "Artist Walls*9", Art Space Tel Aviv, curator: Nir Harmat.
- 2018 "Israeli chutzpah", Holon Institute of Technology, curator: Michal Chill.
- 2019 "Missing link", Modi'in-Maccabim-Re'ut artist house, curators: Gabi Yair and Tal Gelfer.
- 2020 "Few days", Art Space Tel Aviv, curator: Nir Harmat.
- 2020 "BANAI: A Musical Journey from Persia to Jerusalem", Tower of David Museum, curator: Tal Cobo.
- 2020 "The Landscape & the Sacred", Contemporary Art Exhibition – Mitzpe Hayamim, curator: Sharon Toval.
- 2021 "Dawn", Artspace Tel Aviv, curator: Yair Barak.

== See also ==
- Visual arts in Israel
