= Nino Everaers =

Dutch footballer (born 1999)

Personal information
- Date of birth: 8 August 1999 (age 27)
- Place of birth: Maastricht, Netherlands
- Height: 1.81 m (5 ft 11 in)
- Position: Midfielder

Team information
- Current team: Meerssen
- Number: 8

Youth career
- –2018: MVV

Senior career*
Years	Team	Apps	(Gls)
2018–2020	MVV	10	(0)
2020–	Meerssen	57	(17)
- * Club domestic league appearances and goals as of 05:01, 4 August 2025 (UTC)

Nino Everaers (born 8 August 1999) is a Dutch footballer who plays as a midfielder for Meerssen.

== Career ==
He made his Eerste Divisie debut for MVV Maastricht on 9 November 2018 in a game against FC Volendam, as a 66th-minute substitute for Doğan Gölpek.

On 3 May 2020, Everaers joined Meerssen.
