= Nino Camardo =

Italian painter (born 1949)

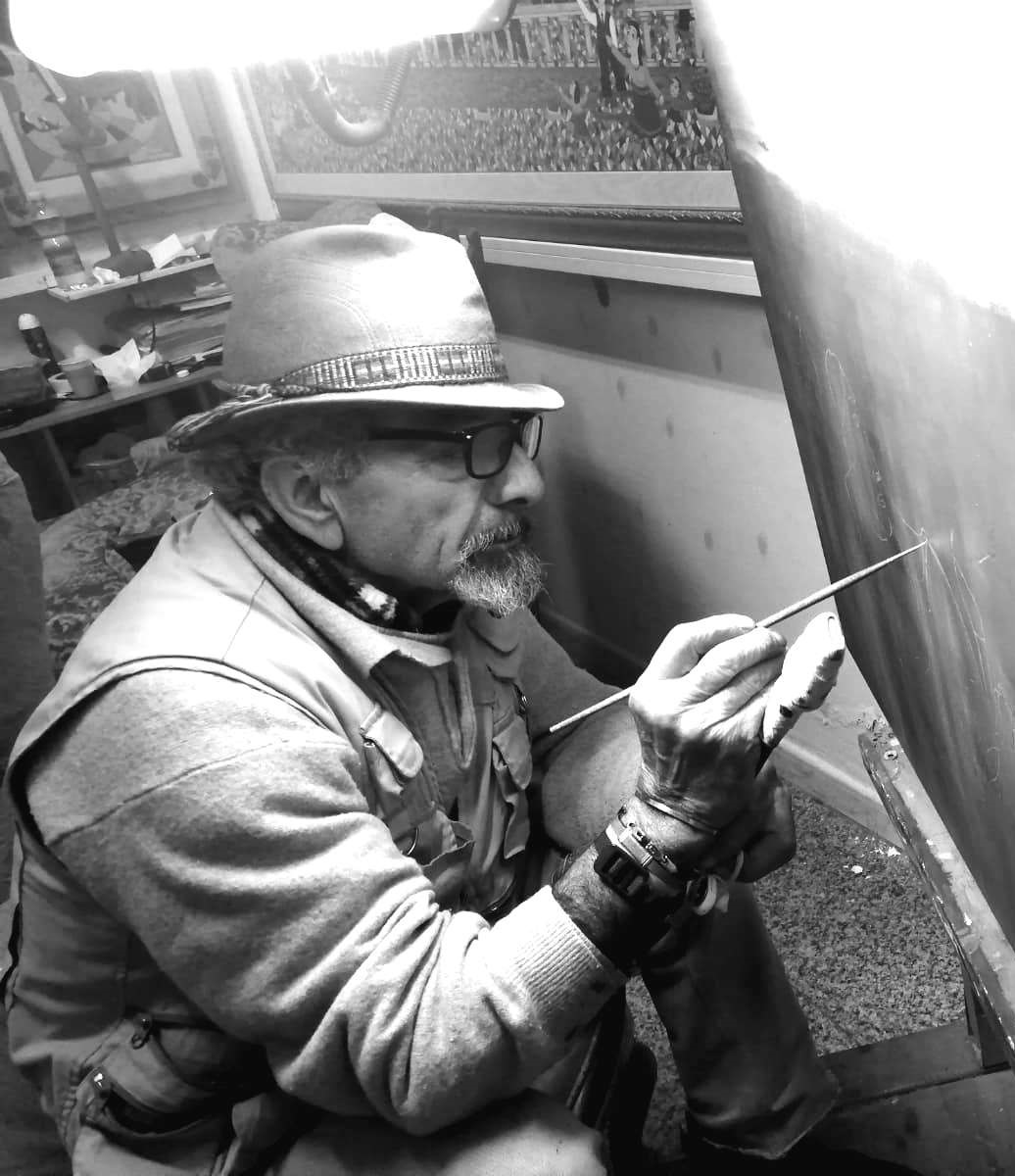
- Nino Camardo
- Born: 24 February 1949 (age 77); Pisticci, Italy
- Occupation: Painter
- Known for: naïve art

Nino Camardo (born 24 February 1949 in Pisticci) is an Italian naïve art painter.

== Early life ==
He was born in Pisticci, in the province of Matera, on 24 February 1949.

== Career ==
Camardo paints subjects in a naïve art style, telling stories of love and poetry through primitive expression. Camardo's career began in the 1970s and received critical recognition.

== Recognition ==
- Prize of the Centro Studi di Roma
- Art in the World Prize

He exhibited at the Palazzo delle Esposizioni in Rome. He is mentioned in art publications, including several editions of The Great Masters of the History of Art and the Bolaffi National Catalog of naïve art. He lives in Tuscany.

== Bibliography ==
- Catalogo Nazionale Bolaffi d'Arte Moderna, no. 8, 1973.
- Catalogo Novecento, profili di artisti contemporanei.
- Catalogo d'Arte GELMI.
- Catalogo nazionale Bolaffi dei naifs, n.2, Giulio Bolaffi Editore.
- Monografia, Nino Camardo, 1976.
- Monografia, Nino Camardo, 1980, by Margonari, Renzo.
- Monografia, Nino Camardo, Palazzo delle Esposizioni del Comune di Roma, 5–20 June 1975.
- Catalogo, Mostra personale di Nino Camardo : pittore naif : dal 5 al 16 febbraio 1971.
- Monografia, Nino Camardo, pittore naif, a cura della Associazione culturale Campano-Lucana.
- Atlante dell'Arte Contemporanea, Edizioni DeAgostini, 2020.ISBN 978-88-5117-183-4
