= Giannino =

Giannino can be both a masculine given name and a surname. It is most common among Italian people. Notable people with this name include:

== As a given name ==
- Giannino Bianco (1944 – 2016), an Italian racing cyclist
- Giannino Bulzone (1911 – 1987), an Italian long-distance runner
- Giannino Castiglioni (1884 – 1971), an Italian sculptor
- Giannino Caruana Demajo (born 1958), a Maltese judge
- Giannino Ferrari dalle Spade (1885 – 1943), an Italian jurist
- Giannino Marzotto (1928 – 2012), an Italian racing driver and entrepreneur

== As a surname ==
- Jessica Giannino (born 1991), an American local politician from Massachusetts
- Oscar Giannino (born 1961), an Italian jurist and politician
