= Movement for Peace =

- Founded: October 2013; 12 years ago United Kingdom
- Founder: Suhaib Saqib
- Type: Non-profit; INGO
- Headquarters: United Kingdom
- Location: Global
- Website: www.movementforpeaceglobal.org

Movement For Peace is a global movement led by Suhaib Saqib, that raises awareness and engages the global community with issues relating to peace, counter-extremism, human rights, justice and education.

== History ==
Movement For Peace was founded in 2013. In 2015, the founder, Suhaib Saqib, at the age of 17, was nominated for the International Children's Peace Prize.

== See also ==
- Anti-war movement
- Peace movement
