= Egisto Nino Ceccatelli =

Italian photographer (born 1943)

Egisto Nino Ceccatelli (born 5 May 1943, in Livorno) is an Italian photographer best known for his ethnographic work depicting people and cultures of various parts of the world.

== Early life ==
Ceccatelli graduated from the University of Florence with a thesis in ethnology and has followed courses in England to improve his English (University of Cambridge) and to enrich his knowledge in photography (University of London).

== Career and current life ==
His artistic skills began in the 1960s at the Metastasio Theatre of Prato where he joined the Teatro Studio: there he gained experience as a scenographer and play director. Later on, he moved to Rome where he worked in the film dubbing industry adapting several films into the English language, among these Porcile directed by Pier Paolo Pasolini. Ceccatelli had already met Pasolini in Morocco whilst working on the film Edipo Re and that experience proved to be crucial for his photography. Egisto Nino Ceccatelli has produced a precious variety of ethno-photographic documentation. Of particular interest are his researches on the Saharawi (Algerian Sahara) with 3 photobooks and various exhibitions, on the Dani (Irian Jaya, Indonesia), on the Dyak (Kalimantan, Indonesia), on the Bonda (Orissa, India), on the northern tribes of Laos, on the Sirionò (Beni, Bolivia), on the rural population of Transilvania (Romania), and on the agropastoral culture of the inhabitants of the Calvana mountains in Tuscany (Italy). Ceccatelli has even produced a series of short films between the mid-70s and the beginning of the 90s and conducted three successful TV programs such as Il mio milione, Il bosco dei sogni and Itinerari fuori porta. He has participated in the 26th and 27th edition of "Festival dei popoli di Firenze" with two photo exhibitions of ethno-anthropologic nature and many of his photographs have been used to illustrate posters, catalogs and books. In 1995 he founded together with Renzo Carlesi the Centro Sperimentale di Fotografia of Prato where he currently teaches photography composition. In October 2005, as a member of the Italian team, Egisto Nino Ceccatelli won the FIAP World Cup for colour prints. In 2012 he co-produced the successful photobook Prato, la nostra città e la nostra gente on his hometown of Prato focusing on the big cultural and economic transformations the city has gone through in the past 30 years. In 2013 on the occasion of his 70th birthday he was awarded by the Municipality of Prato the rare honorary award "Gigliato pratese" for his lifetime achievements. The event was followed by a special evening showcasing a selection of his best works. In 2017 and 2018 Ceccatelli lived for various months in Bethlehem to document as a photographer, the Basilica of Nativity restoration undertaken by the Italian firm Piacenti Spa.

== Short films ==
- La laguna di Hemingway (1988)
- Soave come la morte (1989)
- Labyrinth (1989)
- I dani della Nuova Guinea (1990)
- I semi della speranza (1991)
- Ma dimmi, che piedi hai? (1992)

== Photo publications ==
- Saharawi, il popolo, la storia (1994)
- Saharawi, una ricerca sul campo (1998)
- La Calvana, storie ed immagini (2003)
- Oltre lo sguardo (2004)
- Camminando insieme (2005)
- Hotel Miramare (2008)
- Calvana (2011)
- Prato, la nostra città e la nostra gente (2012)
- Saharawi, nella terra dei piccoli ambasciatori di pace (1983-2013) (2013)
- Monte Morello, storie, bellezze e la sua gente (2015)
- Carmignano, le radici e le ali (2015)
- Betlemme, il suo tesoro e la sua gente (2020)
