= Pisticci =

- Comune
- Comune di Pisticci
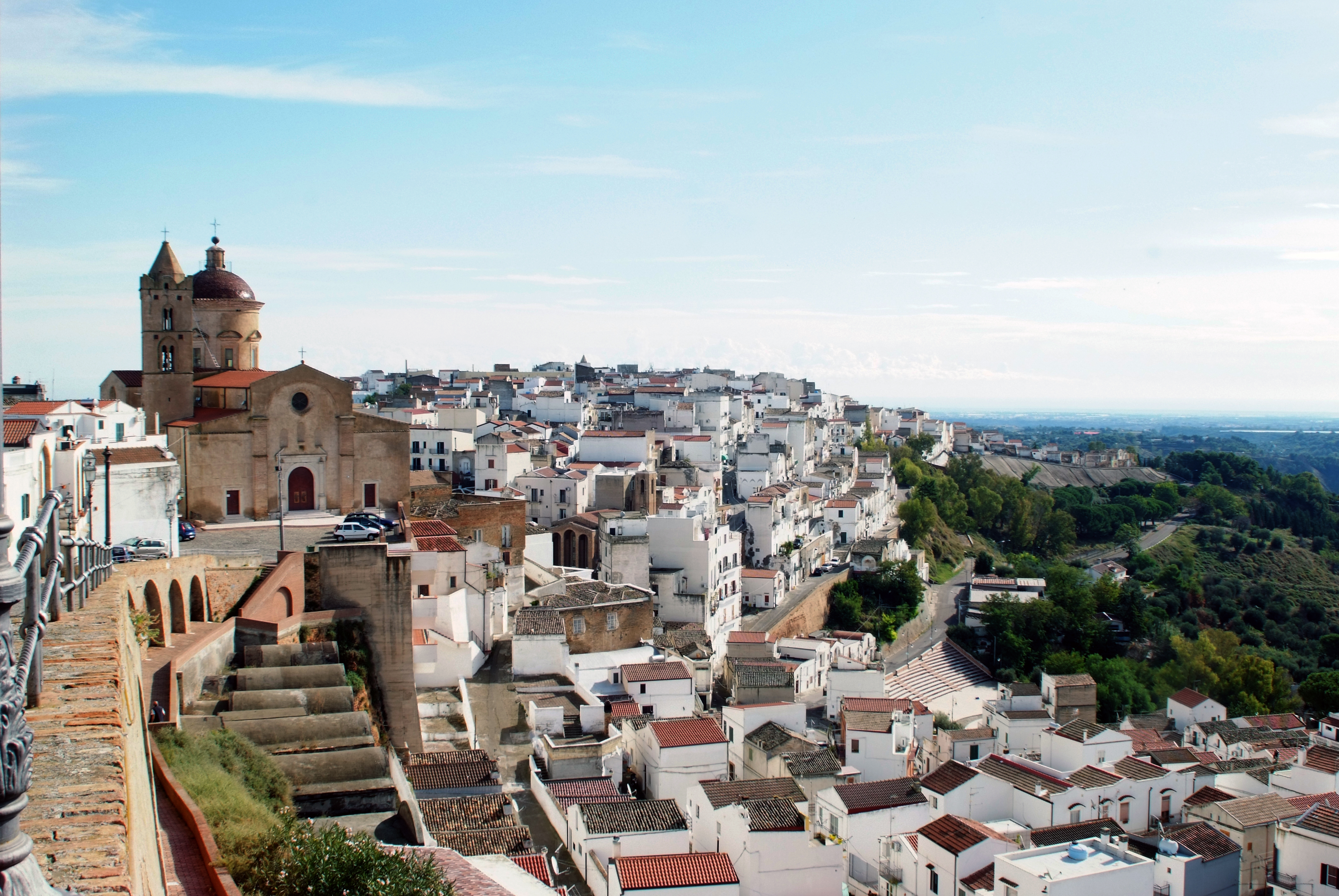
- View of Pisticci

- Coat of arms

- Location of Pisticci in Italy Pisticci (Basilicata)
- Coordinates: 40°23′N 16°33′E
- Country: Italy
- Region: Basilicata
- Province: Matera (MT)
- Frazioni: Casinello, Centro Agricolo, Marconia, Pisticci Scalo, Tinchi

Government
  - Mayor: Domenico Alessandro Albano

Area
  - Total: 231 km^{2} (89 sq mi)
- Elevation: 364 m (1,194 ft)

Population (31 December 2015)
  - Total: 17,768
  - Density: 76.9/km^{2} (199/sq mi)
- Demonym: Pisticcesi
- Time zone: UTC+1 (CET)
  - Summer (DST): UTC+2 (CEST)
- Postal code: 75015
- Dialing code: 0835
- ISTAT code: 077020
- Patron saint: St. Roch
- Saint day: 16 August
- Website: www.comune.pisticci.mt.it

Pisticci (Metapontino: Pestìzze; Latin: Pesticium) is a town comune in the province of Matera, in the Southern Italian region of Basilicata. Pisticci is the fourth most populous town in the region and the most populous in the province after Matera. It is known for being the production site of Amaro Lucano, a renowned Italian liqueur.

== Saints Peter and Paul Mother Church ==
The church stands on the site of an early church which dates from 1212, retaining its bell tower and two of its stained glass windows. In 1542 it was expanded by the addition of two extra aisles, constructed by Pietro and Antonio Laviola, two brothers who were later accused of murder in Mantua.

The church is in the Romanesque-Renaissance style, with an angled roof, and is built in the shape of a Latin cross, with three aisles. On the left and right are small chapels, under which are buried the remains of important local people. Each chapel has a statue by the sculptor Salvatore Sacquegna. The interior walls of the church are decorated with 18th-century pictures painted by Domenico Guarino, among which Our Lady of Mount Carmel, the Madonna del Pozzo, and the Mysteries of the Rosary are especially notable.

== History ==
From April 1939 and during World War II, Pisticci was the site of a concentration camp considered the first in Fascist Italy. On 14 September 1943, the Special Air Service raided the camp and freed approximately 200 prisoners captive there.

== Notable people ==
- Pietro Luigi M. Leone (1937–2023), Byzantinist and academic
- Nino Camardo (born 1949), artist
