= Nino Nipote =

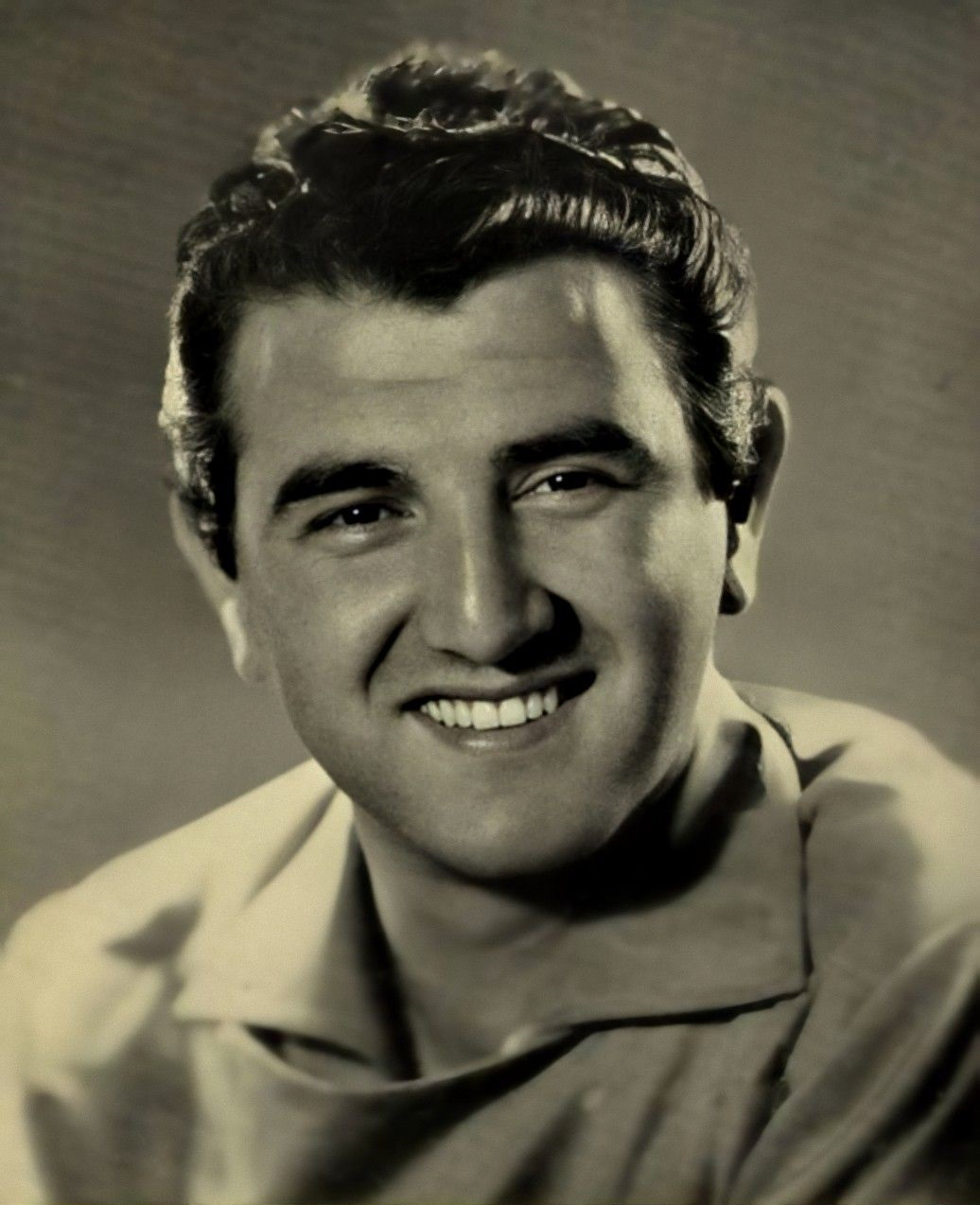

Background information
- Born: Antonio Nipote; 24 August 1925; Naples, Italy
- Died: 4 March 1997 (aged 71) Naples, Italy
- Genre: Neapolitan song
- Years active: 1950–1962
- Labels: Cetra, Vis Radio, Harmony record

Antonio Nipote, better known as Nino Nipote (24 August 1925 – 4 March 1997), was an Italian singer.

== Biography ==
Last of ten sons, Nino Nipote (real name Antonio Nipote) was born in Naples on 24 August 1925, in the Vicaria district.

In 1947 he participated in L'ora del dilettante, a competition for new entries organised by ENAL at the Tarsia Theater (the current Roberto Bracco). The president of the commission, Vittorio Parisi, recommended him a period of study with the master Nino Campanino. After two years of lessons Nino passed a first selection at the radio, and after another audition he passed from the direction of the Campese orchestra to the Anepeta orchestra.

In 1950 he began to record his first discs for the record company Cetra, with the Anepeta and Vinci orchestras. The following year he participated in the Piedigrottissima della Cetra with the songs 'A vocca 'e Cuncettina and Fenesta rosa, along with other singers, including Aurelio Fierro and Eva De Paoli. In 1953 he took part in the Piedigrotta Abici, interpreting Nisciuno by Antonio Vian and, in the same year, he participated in the magazine of Amedeo Greco Poesie e Canzoni with Tina De Paolis, Agostino Salvietti, Aurelio Fierro and Alberto Amato. The following year, in 1954 he was in the cast of the second Festival of Naples where, in conjunction with Katyna Ranieri, he performed Canta cu mme. The other song proposed entitled Ched'è l'ammore, dubbed by Carla Boni, had less luck and was eliminated in prime time. In the same year he triumphed at the Piedigrotta Acampora with the songs Vela sulitaria and Piazzetta azzurra. In 1955 at the Piedigrotta Bideri he proposed the tune 'O 'nzisto and, in the same year, he participated in the 1st Festival della Canzone Italiana e Napoletana organized by the Anepeta orchestra.

In 1957 he changed record labels, passing to Aldo Scoppa's Vis Radio and participated in the Festival of Naples with the songs Passiggiatella and Tutto me parla 'e te. In the meantime he participated to numerous programs of variety with Tecla Scarano, Alberto Amato, Aldo Tarantino and others.

He retired from the music scene in the first half of the 1960s.

He died in Naples on 4 March 1997.

== Partial discography ==
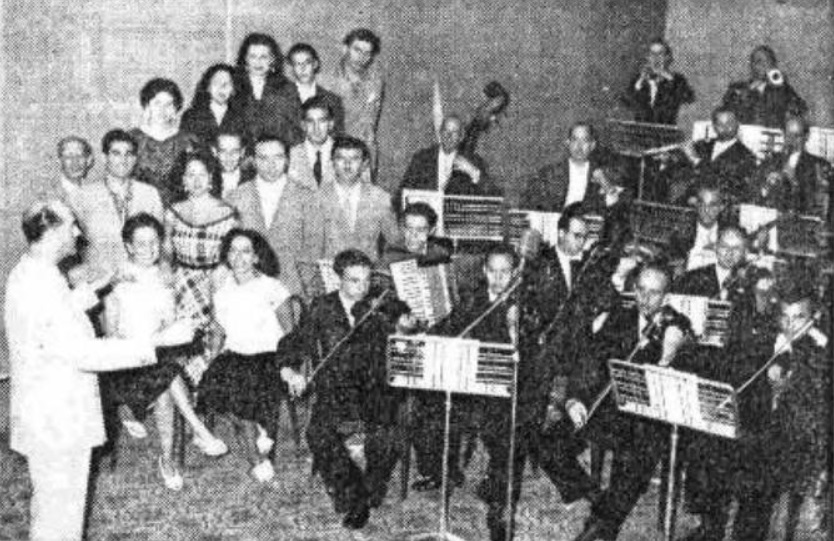
The corps of singers and the orchestra directed by Luigi Vinci of the "Vetrina di Piedigrotta"

=== Singles ===
- 1951 – 'A vocca 'e Cuncettina/Fenesta rosa (Cetra, DC 5369)
- 1951 – Ddoie lettere/Nemmeno 'e rrose (Cetra, DC 5372)
- 1951 – Fra Napule e Milano/Uocchie 'e brillante (Cetra, DC 5385)
- 1951 – Scurriato schiocca/Vulesse addeventà (Cetra, DC 5386)
- 1951 – Sole grigio/Luna, lù!... (Cetra, DC 5389)
- 1951 – Mezzanotte senza 'e stelle/Femmene, sciure e musica (Cetra, DC 5390; side B sings Antonio Basurto)
- 1952 – Voca guagliò/'O princepe indiano (Cetra, DC 5574; side B sings Pina Lamara)
- 1952 – Li funtanelle/Tuppe... ttu' (Cetra, DC 5575; side B sings Pina Lamara)
- 1952 – 'A riggina d''e tarantelle/Sciummo (Cetra, DC 5576; side A sings Pina Lamara)
- 1952 – Lassame sunnà/Maria è robba mia! (Cetra, DC 5577; side A sings Pina Lamara)
- 1952 – 'A litoranea/Nustalgia (Cetra, DC 5578; side A sings Antonio Basurto)
- 1952 – Margellina/Desiderio 'e sole (Cetra, DC 5583; side B sings Domenico Attanasio)
- 1953 – Venite 'o chiatamone/Margarita e Mastru Ciccio (Cetra, DC 5805; side B sings Maria Vittoria)
- 1953 – Fenestella 'e Marechiaro/Guaglione 'e pianino (Cetra, DC 5807)
- 1953 – 'N coppa 'e Camaldule/Giuramento (Cetra, DC 5810)
- 1953 – Dannazione d'o core/Poveri rrose (Cetra, DC 5848; side A sings Antonio Basurto)
- 1953 – Fuoco 'e ammore/'O vico d'e suspire (Cetra, DC 5889)
- 1954 – Fantasia 'e nnammurate/Tu puorte 'o stesso nomme (Cetra, DC 5948)
- 1954 – Ched'è l'ammore/Balcone Chiuso (Cetra, DC 6019)
- 1954 – Canta cu' mme/Rota 'e fuoco e faccia 'e neve (Cetra, DC 6020; side B sings Antonio Basurto)
- 1954 – Pulecenella/Tre rundinelle (Cetra, DC 6021; side A sings Pina Lamara)
- 1954 – Embe 'Mberebe' 'Mbembe'/'O gallo e 'a gallina (Cetra, DC 6110)
- 1954 – 'E spingole francese/Funtana all'ombra (Cetra, DC 6126)
- 1954 – 'E vetrine/Ciccillo e Vincenzella (Cetra, DC 6171)
- 1955 – 'E llampare/Geluso 'e te (Cetra, DC 6318; disc recorded with the Quintetto Partenopeo, lato A canta Tullio Pane)
- 1955 – Luna chiara/Curiosità (Cetra, DC 6319; disc recorded with the Quintetto Partenopeo)
- 1955 – 'O ritratto 'e Nanninnella/Me songo 'nnammurato 'e te (Cetra, DC 6320; disc recorded with the Quintetto Partenopeo)
- 1955 – Luna janca/'A bonanema 'e ll'ammore (Cetra, DC 6323; disc recorded with the Quintetto Partenopeo, side A sings Luciano Glori)
- 1955 – Nun voglio fa 'o sergente/Chitarre e manduline (Cetra, DC 6331)
- 1955 – Maruzzella/So' chiacchiere (Cetra, DC 6334; side B sings Tullio Pane)
- 1955 – 'A dispettosa/'O 'nfinfero (Cetra, DC 6381)
- 1955 – 'O 'nzisto/Povera figliulella (Cetra, DC 6382)
- 1955 – 'Nnammuratella/Spatella argiento (Cetra, DC 6383)
- 1955 – Vienetenne a Positano/Bella campagnola (Cetra, DC 6384)
- 1956 – Napule nun more/Zampugnaro 'nnammurato (Cetra, DC 6497)
- 1956 – Lacreme napulitane/I te vurria vasà (Cetra, DC 6498)
- 1956 – Scetate/Guapparia (Cetra, DC 6499)
- 1956 – Come pioveva/Fili d'oro (Cetra, DC 6500)
- 1957 – Tu vuò fà l'americano/Serenatella sciuè sciuè (Vis Radio, Vi-5778)
- 1957 – Storta va diritta vene/Cantammola 'sta canzone! (Vis Radio, Vi-5853)
- 1957 – Passiggiatella/Serenatella 'e maggio (Vis Radio, Vi-5854)
- 1957 – Ma che guaglione/Scugnezziello 'nnammurato (Vis Radio, Vi-5961)
- 1957 – Serenata a Carulina/Pazzagliona (Vis Radio, Vi-5962)
- 1961 – Nisciuno/Che vuo' capì (Harmony record, HCN 0018)

=== Compilations ===
- 1953 – Piedigrotta '53 (Cetra, LPA 5; with Antonio Basurto, Maria Vittoria)
- 1954 – 2º Festival della Canzone Napoletana (Cetra, LPA 13; with Pina Lamara, Tullio Pane)
- 1955 – Il Golfo Incantato (Cetra, LPA 39; with Delfina Basso, Luciano Glori, Tullio Pane)
- 1957 – 5º Festival della Canzone Napoletana (Vis radio, ViMT 24049)
- 1964 – Concerto per Napoli vol. 2 (Vis Radio, VIS LP 2066)
- 1971 – Festival Della Canzone Napoletana (1) (Seven Seas, SR-615~6)
- 2015 – Le canzoni dei ricordi, Vol. 29 (Canzoni e cantanti anni 1940 e 1950) (Archivi del Novecento)
