= Lynn Di Nino =

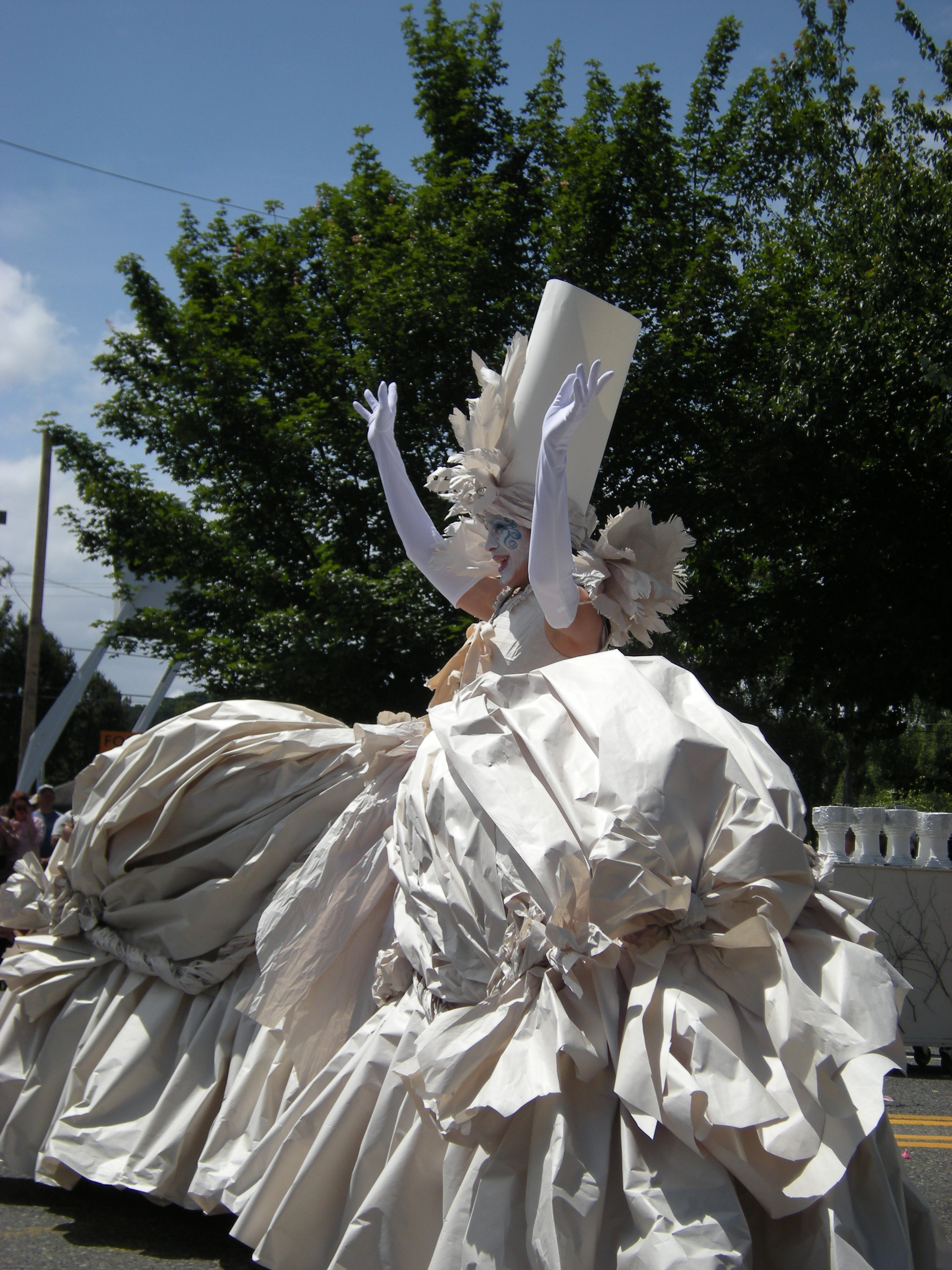
- Ice Queen costume from 2009 Fremont Solstice Parade
- Born: January 5, 1945 (age 81); Roswell, New Mexico
- Elected: Former President of Northwest Designer Craftsmen
- Website: www.lynndinino.com

Lynn Di Nino (born January 5, 1945) is an American artist residing in Tacoma, Washington. In 2017, Di Nino was awarded the Washington State Governor's "Artist of the Year" Award.

== Biography ==
A self-taught artist, Lynn Di Nino works in a variety of media, often in collaboration with other artists. Raised by a single mother of five who worked as a waitress, she collected many throw-aways in order to create her art projects. Lynn became a full-time artist after a recession lay-off at Seattle Mental Health where she worked as a recreational therapist. She is known for her whimsical animal sculpture with a welded steel skeleton created from fabric or concrete, often incorporating found objects. She also works with recycled materials on projects involving social and political observations.

== Work ==
Examples of her work include:

- Chalkboard chicken in 1993, which became a business selling molded concrete art objects. Sold business in 2001.
- Created the armatures used by seven other artists to create the Fremont Solstice Parade and Earth Day Ice Queen Costumes in 2009.
- Burnham & Root Uprooted assemblage sculptural work memorializing the demolished Luzon Building.
- Coats of Many Sweaters apparel made from recycled sweaters.
