= Nino Pasti =

Italian politician

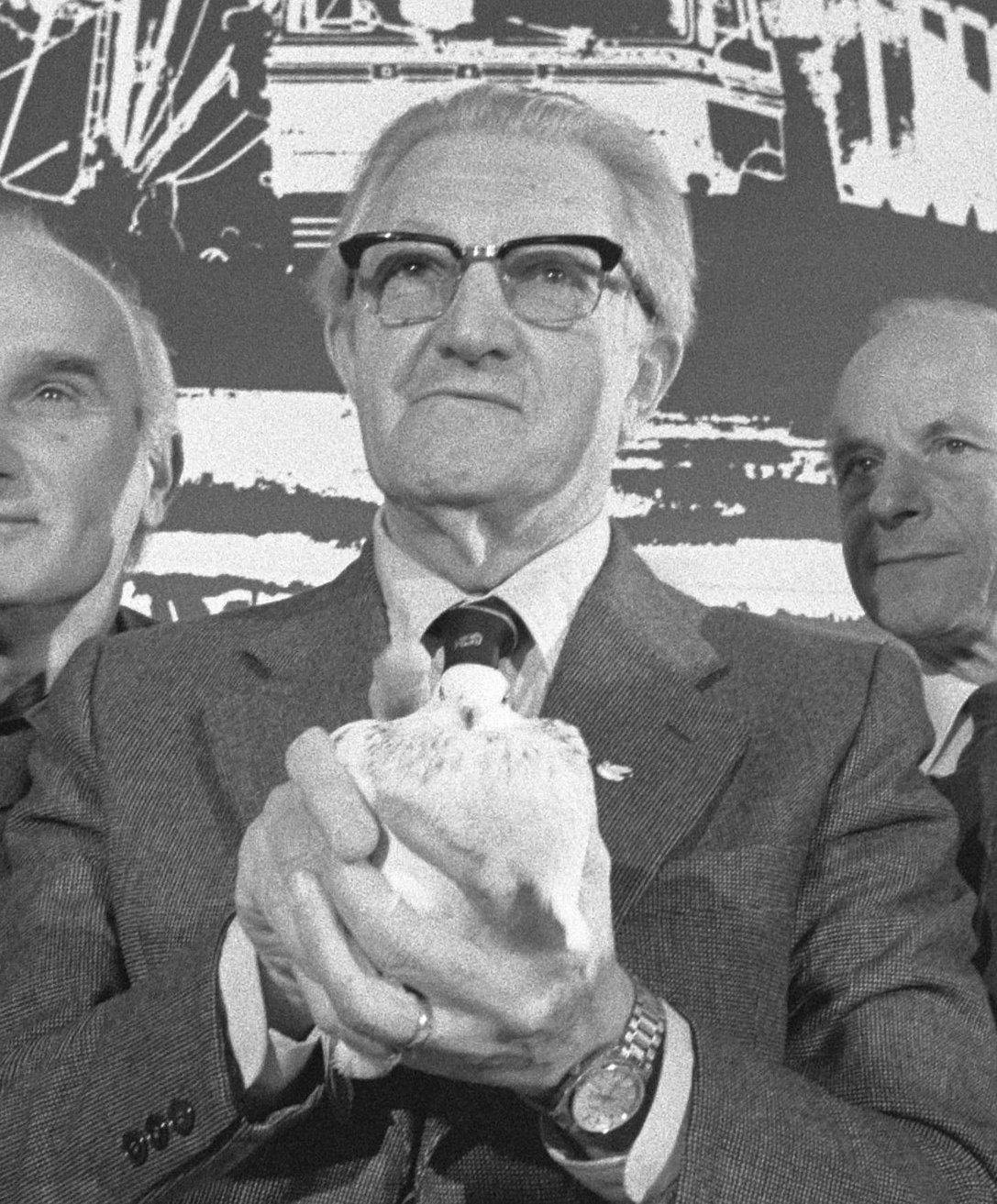

Member of Senate
- In office 1976–1983

Personal details
- Born: 18 April 1909 Bologna
- Died: 21 August 1992 (aged 83) Rome
- Profession: Politician, journalist

Nino Pasti (18 April 1909 – 21 August 1992) was an Italian politician, journalist and general of the Italian Air Force.

== Biography ==
Born in Bologna in 1909, he fought in the Ethiopian War in 1939 and in the Second World War until 1941, when he was taken prisoner by the British in Danakil. In the postwar period, he held important positions as an air squad general such as deputy chief of staff of the Air Force, president of the Higher Council of the Armed Forces and NATO Deputy Supreme Commander in Europe for nuclear affairs.

In 1976, Pasti accepted from Ugo Pecchioli the proposal to run as an independent leftist on the PCI lists and was elected to the Senate in the same year and in 1979. He entered on a collision course with the party leaders regarding the equidistant judgment that these had given of NATO after the Prague Spring and the events in Warsaw (Solidarność), while in his opinion the US military strategy was becoming increasingly aggressive.

The disagreement with the party arose on the occasion of the defensive deployment of NATO missiles in Comiso in response to those already installed by the Soviet Union. On 30 November 1986, Pasti founded the Movement for Peace and Socialism, and took special interest in the struggle against nuclear weapons until his death in 1992.
