= Niño (name) =

- Gender: Male
- Language: Spanish

Origin
- Meaning: Boy, child, kid
- Region of origin: Spain, Latin America, Philippines

Other names
- Pet names: Nene, Nano
- Anglicisations: Nino, Ninio
- Related names: Niña

Niño (Spanish for boy) is a given name, nickname and surname of Spanish origin. The appearance of the surname dates back to medieval Spain, where several prestigious families had the surname, such as the Niño de Guevara family of Bishops from Andalusia, and the Niño brothers, who were involved in the Discovery of the Americas. Because of the popularity of the surname at the time of the colonization, it is now most common in countries such as Colombia, Mexico and Venezuela, while relatively rare in Spain.

The term Niño has also been used as a nickname since at least the 13th century, when the illegitimate son of King Alfonso X was known as "El Niño". The nickname has been especially popular among flamenco singers, such as el Niño de Cabra (1890s), el Niño del Carmen (1900s), el Niño Escacena (1900s), el Niño Genil (1920s), el Niño Ricardo (1930s), el Niño Pérez (1930s), el Niño de Almadén (1950s), el Niño de Málaga (1950s), el Niño de Utrera (1950s), el Niño de Murcia (1950s), el Niño Josele (2000s) and Niño de Elche (2010s). A related word and nickname is nene, by which several people are known, such as Argentine footballer Juan Héctor Guidi, Cuban singer Pedro Lugo and Moroccan drug trafficker Mohamed Taieb Ahmed. The nickname nano (e.g. singer Román León, F1 driver Fernando Alonso) is less common.

== Given name ==
Although rarely used as a forename in Spain or Latin America, Niño is a common name in the Philippines.

- Niño del Mar C. Volante, known as Nyoy Volante (born 1978), Filipino entertainer
- Niño Martin Eday (born 1993), Filipino mountain bike athlete
- Niño Ramírez (1912 – ???), Filipino long jump athlete

== Nickname ==
- Francis Alcantara, known as "Niño", (born 1992), Filipino tennis player
- Alfonso Fernández el Niño (c. 1243–1281), Spanish nobleman
- José Fernández (pitcher), known as "Niño", (1992–2016), Cuban baseball player
- Niño Valdés (born Geraldo Ramos Ponciano Valdés) (1924–2001), Cuban boxer
- Niño Muhlach (born Angelo Jose Rocha Muhlach, 1971), Filipino actor
- Niño de Murcia, Spanish flamenco singer and guitarist
- Niño Josele (born Juan José Heredia, 1974), Spanish guitarist
- Niño Ricardo (born Manuel Serrapí Sánchez, 1904–1972), Spanish flamenco composer and guitarist
- Niño Fidencio (born José Fidencio de Jesús Sintora Constatino, 1898–1938), Mexican curandero
- Niño Rivera (born Andrés Echevarría Callava, 1919–1996), Cuban musician

== Surname ==
- Alex Niño (born 1940), Filipino comics artist
- Andrés Niño (1475 – c. 1530), Spanish navigator
- Eduardo Niño (born 1967), Colombian footballer
- Edward Niño Hernández (born 1986), Colombian dwarf
- Carlos Gabriel Niño (born 1977), American celebrity
- Henry Niño (born 1997), Nicaraguan footballer
- Ilva Niño (1933–2024), Brazilian actress, director and theater teacher
- Juan Niño (born 1990), Colombian footballer
- José Ferrándiz y Niño (1847–1918), Spanish politician
- Joselyn Alejandra Niño, alias La Flaca, (1990s – 2015), Mexican suspected assassin
- Libardo Niño (born 1968), Colombian cyclist
- Miguel Ángel Niño (born 1968), Colombian cyclist
- Omar Niño Romero (born 1976), Mexican boxer
- Orlando García Niño (born 1995), Mexican footballer
- Pablo Niño (born 1978), Spanish footballer
- Pablo Sánchez Niño (born 1995), Spanish footballer
- Pedro Alonso Niño (1455 – c. 1505), Spanish explorer
- Pero Niño (1378–1453), Spanish privateer
- Rafael Antonio Niño (born 1949), Colombian cyclist
- Víctor Niño (born 1973), Colombian cyclist

=== Double-barreled surnames ===
- Fernando Niño de Guevara (patriarch) (d. 1552), Spanish archbishop
- Fernando Niño de Guevara (1541–1609), Spanish cardinal
- David Niño de Guzmán (1969–2011), Bolivian journalist and editor
- Homero Niño de Rivera (born 1975), Mexican politician
- Juan Niño de Tabora (died 1632), Spanish general
- Sofia Niño de Rivera (born 1981), Mexican entertainer

== See also ==
- Niño (disambiguation)
- Neno (name)
- Nilo (name)
- Nina (name)
- Niña (name)
- Nino (name)
- Ninos (name)
- Nin (surname)
- Ning (surname)
- Ninho
- Nano (disambiguation)
- Nono (disambiguation)
- Nini (disambiguation)
- 9 (disambiguation)
- NIO (disambiguation)
- Niko (disambiguation)
