= Nilo =

Nilo may refer to:

- Nilo (name)
- Nilo, Cundinamarca, a town in Colombia

== See also ==
- Nilo-Saharan languages
- Nilo Rukundpur, a village in Patepur Tehsil, Vaishali, Bihar, India
- Nilo Syrtis, a region just north of Syrtis Major Planum on Mars
- Nile (disambiguation)
