= Cabeza de Vaca (film) =

- Theatrical release poster
- Directed by: Nicolás Echevarría
- Written by: Guillermo Sheridan Nicolás Echevarría
- Based on: Naufragios y comentarios by Álvar Núñez Cabeza de Vaca
- Starring: Juan Diego; Daniel Giménez Cacho; Roberto Sosa; Carlos Castañón; Gerardo Villarreal
- Cinematography: Guillermo Navarro
- Edited by: Rafael Castanedo
- Music by: Mario Lavista
- Release date: February 1991
- Running time: 112 minutes
- Country: Mexico
- Languages: Spanish; Latin

Cabeza de Vaca is a 1991 Mexican film directed by Nicolás Echevarría and starring Juan Diego about the adventures of Álvar Núñez Cabeza de Vaca (c. 1490 – c. 1557), an early Spanish explorer, as he traversed what later became the American South.

Cabeza de Vaca was one of four survivors of the Narváez expedition and shipwreck. He became known as a shaman among the Native American tribes he encountered, which helped him survive. His journey of a number of years began in 1528. After his return to Spain, he published his journal in 1542. The screenplay by Guillermo Sheridan and Nicolás Echevarría is based on Cabeza de Vaca's journal Naufragios y comentarios ("Shipwrecks and Commentaries").

The film was entered into the 41st Berlin International Film Festival. The film was selected as the Mexican entry for the Best Foreign Language Film at the 63rd Academy Awards, but was not accepted as a nominee.

A DVD version was released in 2012.

== Cast ==
- Juan Diego as Alvar Núñez Cabeza de Vaca
- Daniel Giménez Cacho as Dorantes
- Roberto Sosa as Cascabel / Araino
- Carlos Castañón as Castillo
- Gerardo Villarreal as Estevanico
- Roberto Cobo as Lozoya (as Roberto 'Calambres' Cobo)
- José Flores as Malacosa
- Eli 'Chupadera' Machuca as Sorcerer
- Farnesio de Bernal as Fray Suárez
- Josefina Echánove as Anciana Avavar
- Max Kerlow as Man in Armor
- Óscar Yoldi as Esquivel
- Beau Melanson as Pánfilo de Narváez

== Reception ==
The film was included in The 100 Best Films of Mexican Cinema list published by the magazine Somos in July 1994 in the 61st position.

== Awards and nominations ==
Organization	Category/Award	Recipient(s)	Result	Ref
Ariel Awards	Best Cinematography	Guillermo Navarro	Nominated	
Ariel Awards	Best Score	Mario Lavista	Nominated	
Ariel Awards	Best Set Design	José Luis Aguilar and Tolita Figueroa	Nominated	
Ariel Awards	Best First Work	Nicolás Echevarría	Nominated	
Berlin International Film Festival	Golden Bear	Nicolás Echevarría	Nominated	
Guadalajara International Film Festival	Dicine Award	Nicolás Echevarría	Won	

== See also ==
- List of submissions to the 63rd Academy Awards for Best Foreign Language Film
- List of Mexican submissions for the Academy Award for Best Foreign Language Film
