= Huichol art =

Type of art

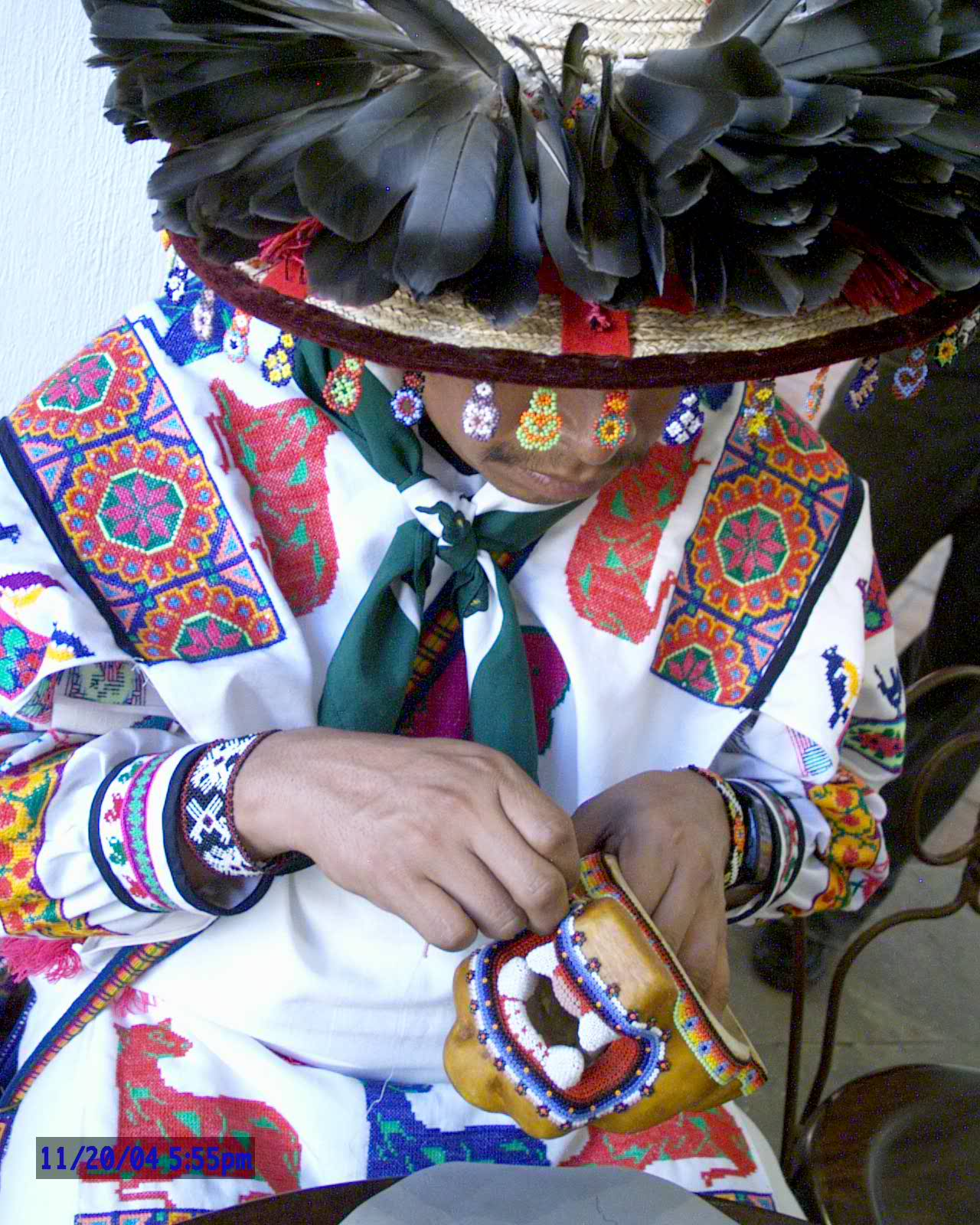
Huichol working on a beaded jaguar head

Huichol art broadly groups the most traditional and most recent innovations in the folk art and handcrafts produced by the Huichol people, who live in the states of Jalisco, Durango, Zacatecas and Nayarit in Mexico. The unifying factor of the work is the colorful decoration using symbols and designs which date back centuries. The most common and commercially successful products are "yarn paintings" and objects decorated with small commercially produced beads. Yarn paintings consist of commercial yarn pressed into boards coated with wax and resin and are derived from a ceremonial tablet called a nierika. The Huichol have a long history of beading, making the beads from clay, shells, corals, seeds and more and using them to make jewelry and to decorate bowls and other items. The "modern" beadwork usually consists of masks and wood sculptures covered in small, brightly colored commercial beads fastened with wax and resin.

While the materials have changed and the purpose of many of the items have changed from religious to commercial purposes, the designs have changed little, and many retain their religious, symbolic and cultural significance. Many outsiders experience Huichol art as tourists in areas such as Guadalajara and Puerto Vallarta, without knowing about the people who make the items, and the meanings of the designs. There are some notable Huichol artists in the yarn painting and beadwork fields, and both types of work have been commissioned for public display and is considered a high value craft.

== The Huichol People ==
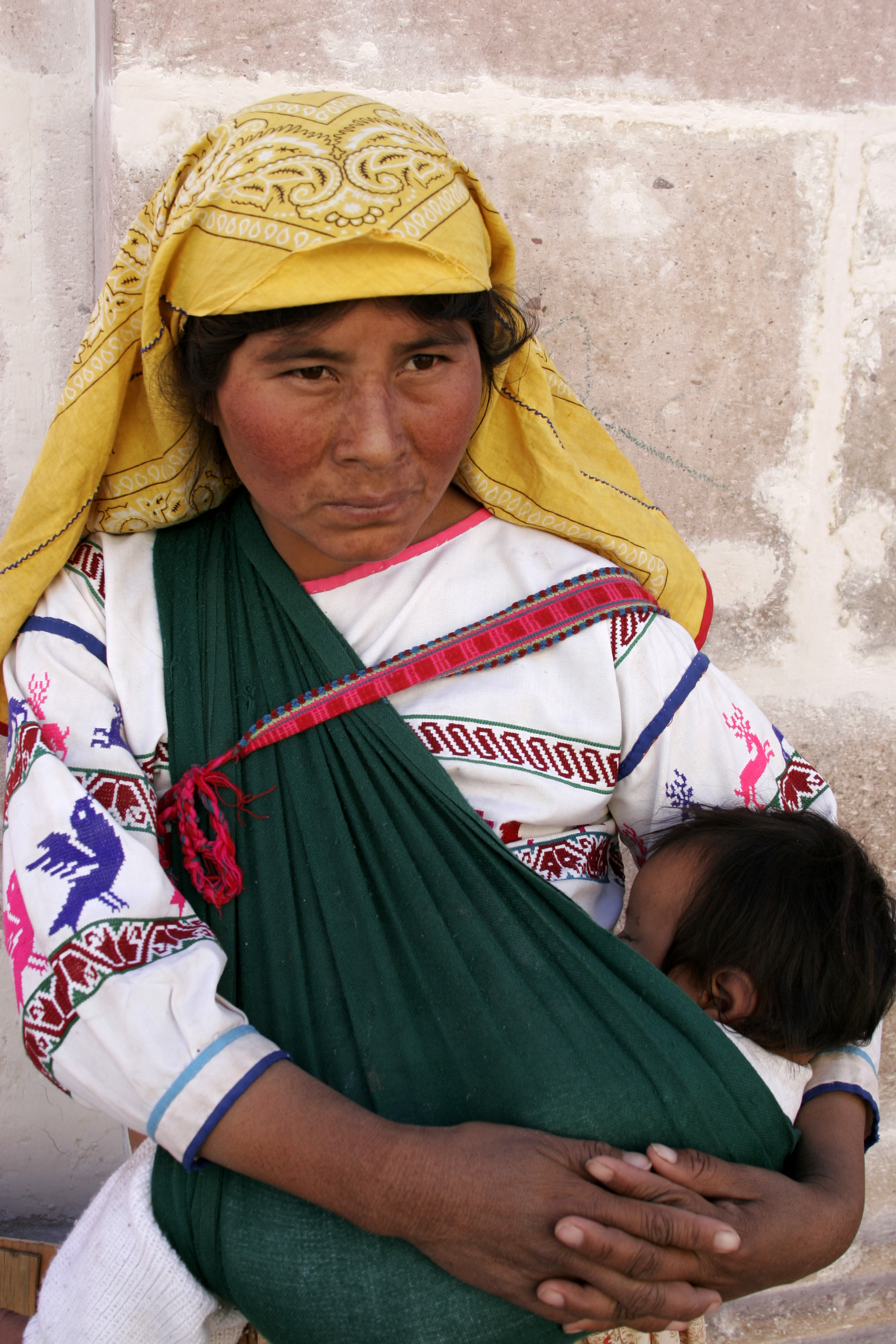
Huichol woman and child

The Huichols are an indigenous people who mostly live in the mountainous areas of northern Jalisco and parts of Nayarit in north central Mexico, with the towns of San Andrés, Santa Catarina and San Sebastián as major cultural centers. Their numbers are estimated at 50,000 and the name Huichol is derived from the word Wirriarika, which means soothsayer or medicine man in the Huichol language.

After the Spanish arrived in the 16th century, the Huichols retreated into the rugged mountains of northern Jalisco and Nayarit. They converted to Christianity in the colonial period by Franciscan missionaries, most of the native Huichol culture managed to survive intact due to the isolation, and because the area lacked mineral or other resources of interest to the Spanish. Mexican historian and anthropologist Fernando Benítez states that the Huichols have probably maintained their ancient belief systems better than any other indigenous group in Mexico. Much of this isolationist tendency remains intact although economic circumstances have forced a number of good Huichols to migrate to areas such as Guadalajara, and coastal areas to work or sell their wares.

The religious faith of the Huichols is still based on a "trinity" of veneration of the deer, corn and peyote. The last is ritually gathered each year on a long pilgrimage to the desert area of San Luis Potosí, where the people are said to have originated and used by shamans. The importance of this and the pantheon of gods is seen in their stylistic representations on just about everything that the Huichol decorate. They did not have a written language until recently, so these symbols were and are the primary form of preserving the ceremonies, myths and beliefs of ancient Huichol religion.

== Yarn painting and beadwork ==
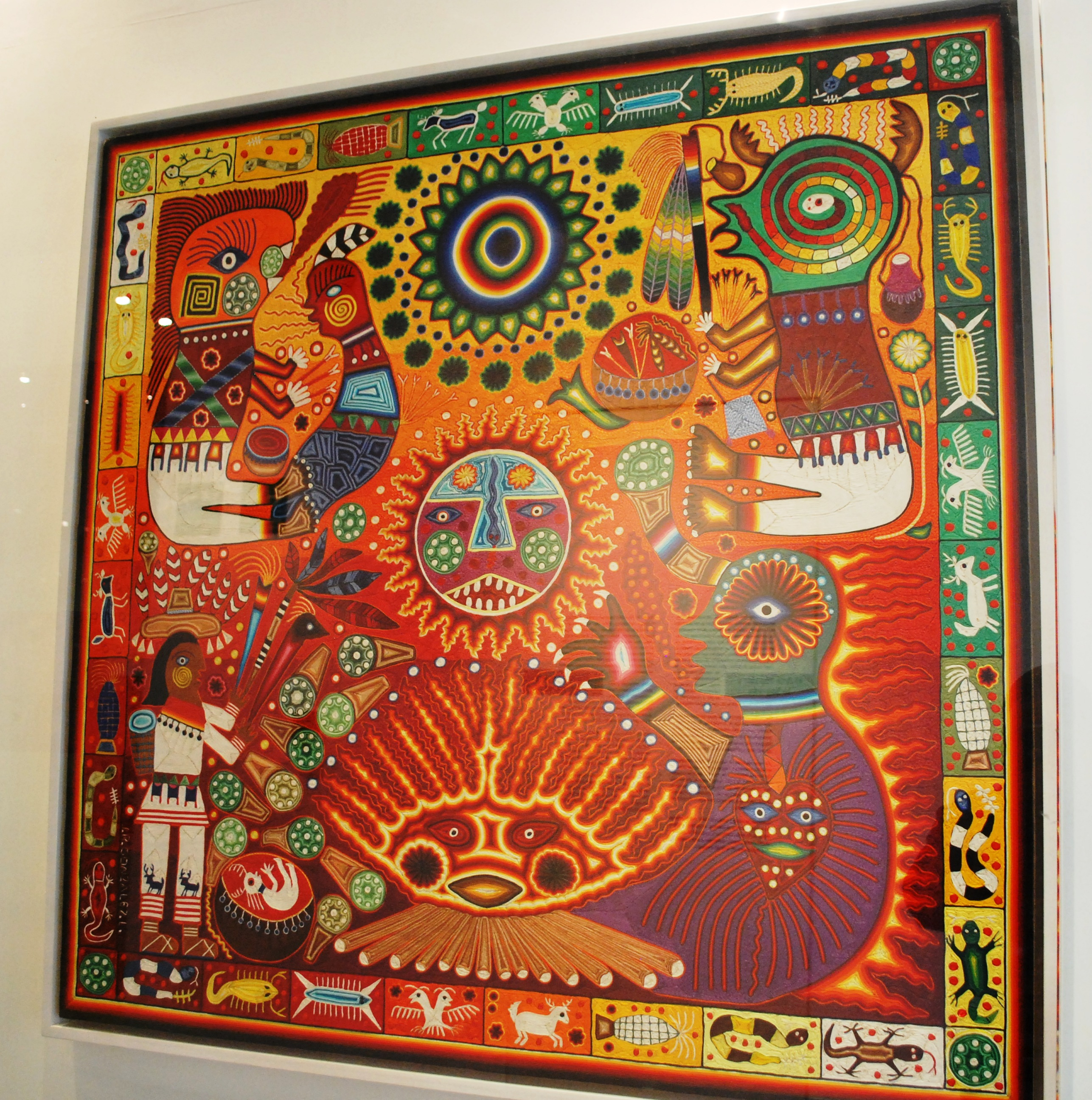
Yarn painting at the Museo de Arte Popular in Mexico City

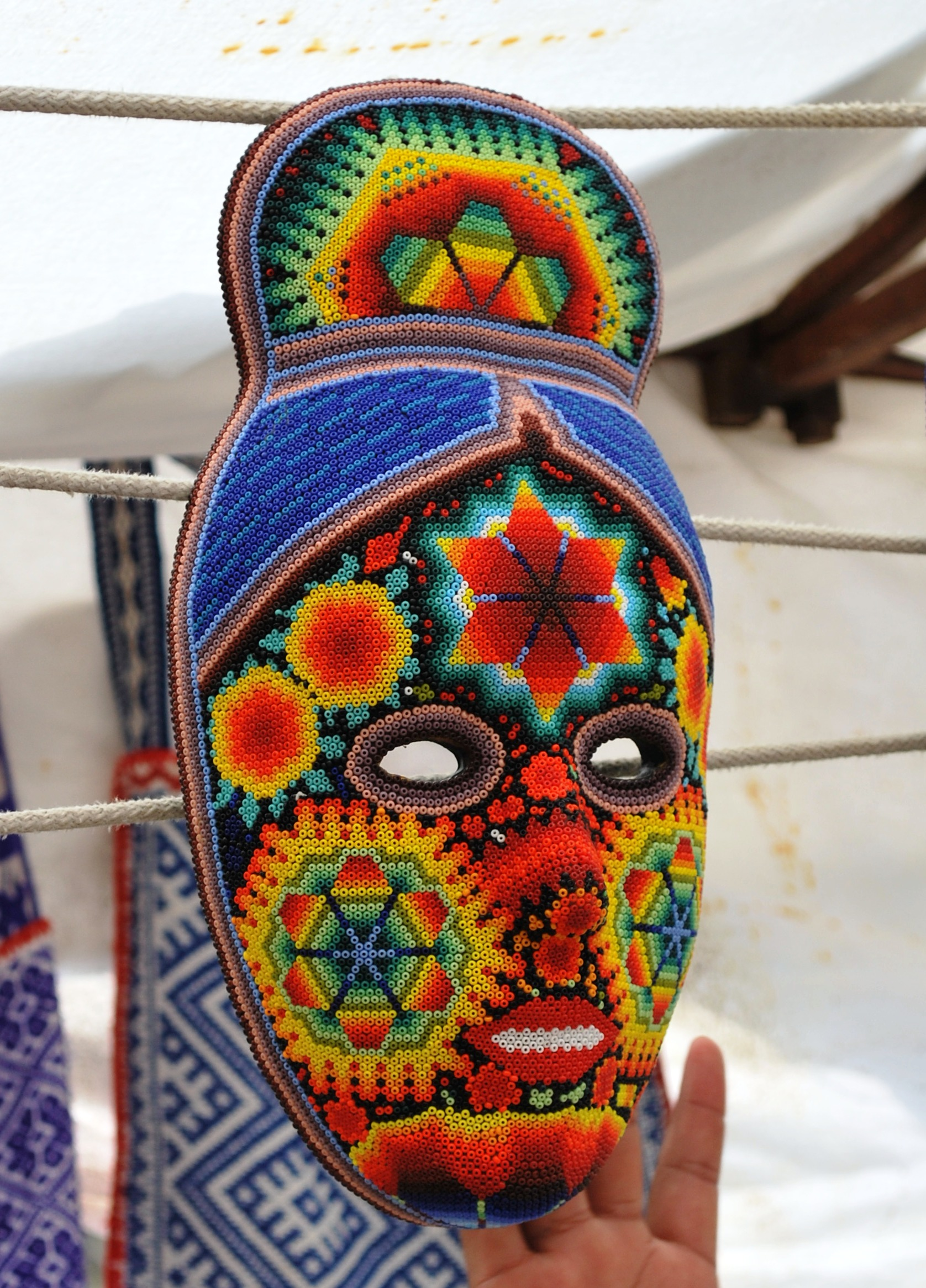
Beaded mask on sale in Tepotzotlán, State of Mexico

The best known Huichol art is made with modern, commercially produced items such as yarn and small beads. The Tepehuánes of Durango adapted the yarn paintings. These have replaced many of the traditional materials such as clay, stone and vegetable dyes. Making and decorating items with beads did not begin with importation of European glass beads, as it did with a number of indigenous cultures to the far north. Techniques for making and using beads have been in place long before that with beads made from bone, clay, stone, coral, turquoise, pyrite, jade and seeds. Huichol art was first documented in the very late 19th century by Carl Lumholtz. This includes the making of beaded earrings, necklaces, anklets and even more.

What mostly links the yarn paintings and beaded objects made today is the continuance of the traditional patterns used for centuries to represent and communicate with the gods. The use of commercial materials has allowed for the production of more elaborate designs and brighter colors, as well as more flexibility in how traditional concepts are rendered. It has also allowed that the production of commercialized folk art along with the production of strictly religious items. The commercialization of Huichol art began when a Franciscan priest by the name of Ernesto Loera Ochoa began a Huichol museum at the Basilica of Our Lady of Zapopan just north of Guadalajara. One of the artists exhibited here was Ramón Medina Silva, whose work was exhibited and sold at the museum. Medina's work came to the attention of American Peter Furst, who suggested that Ramón represent the traditions and beliefs of his people by pressing colored yarn into a wax and resin-covered baseboard. These yarn paintings first appeared in 1962 in Guadalajara and were derived from "nierikas" a small board or disc with a hole or mirror in the center. Nierikas were initially produced by shamans to represent visions they experienced while consuming peyote, then left as offerings to the gods in places such as caves, temples and streams.

These modern yarn paintings quickly proved popular and were imitated. They have also developed into complex designs which can take weeks to complete. The yarn paintings led to experimentation with other commercially produced materials such as beads, which have taken the place of yarn for many Huichol artisans. This beading has been expanded to include the decoration of jaguar heads, masks of the sun and moon and various animal forms.

This art produced for commercial purposes has provided an important, sustainable source of income for the Huichols. Even though new materials are being used, traditional symbols are maintained and transmitted to younger generations. However, the production of goods for commercial markets has caused a certain amount of controversy. One question concerns the "authenticity" of the yarn and bead art given the current forms’ modern origins. One person to do this was Fernando Benítez, who was particularly disturbed by the depiction of the dead as floating heads in yarn paintings; something he said was not traditionally Huichol. (origensbarnett) Much of the "authenticity" of the modern works has to do with the continued use of traditional symbols and designs. However, some items of Huichol items can be deemed non-traditional or borderline traditional, such as the production of Christmas tree decorations, masks of the sun and moon, the use of the jaguar (a Mesoamerican symbol) and the incorporation of modern images such as airplanes and modern buildings into designs. Selling of the items has not been easy for the Huichol either, with limited outlets such as tourist venues, especially Puerto Vallarta, Guadalajara and San Miguel de Allende as well as sales to middlemen who can earn much more from the works than they can.(CRUruibe)

== Noted Huichol artists ==
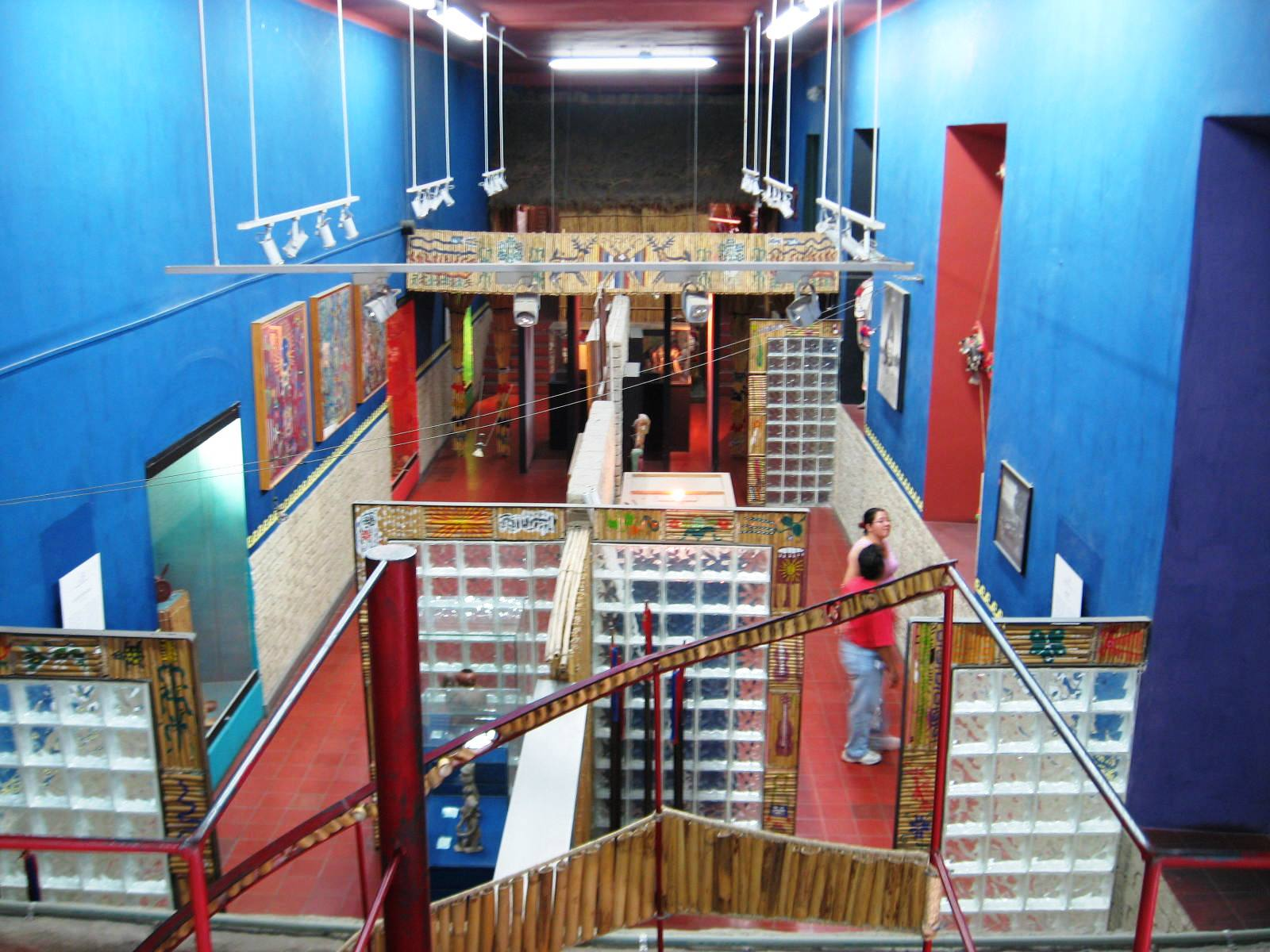
Inside the Huichol museum in the Basilica of Zapopan, Jalisco

Notable Huichol artists include Emeteria Ríos Martínez, who has done a number of yarn painting murals. José Benítez Sánchez is a shaman-artist, who helped to expand yarn painting from its early decorative function to larger more vision like pieces. Pablo Taizan is also a shaman in the village of Mesa de Tirador. He principally does beadwork featuring animal figures used in healing. Santos de la Torre made a great mural for the metro station Palais Royal at the Louvre, Paris. In 2013 Mexican portrait documentary 'Echo of the Mountain', originally known in Spanish as Eco de la montaña directed by Nicolás Echevarría released based on his experiences during the mural creation.

== More traditional items ==
Although the yarn paintings and items decorated with beads are the best known and most widely sold pieces, the Huichols continue to make a number of other types of folk art and handcrafts. Urus, or prayer arrows, are ceremonial arrows created to be shot into the air and petition the gods for special blessings. They are also sometimes left at certain places or sent down rivers. These arrows are decorated with symbols and designs related to the petition.

From the far past to the present, men, women and children all wear woven bags around their waist to carry personal objects. These bags are colored and otherwise decorated for aesthetic and to magically protect the wearer.

A "kuka" is a three dimensional ceremonial mask which is decorated by beading. These masks evolved from small gourd bowls originally covered in seeds, bone, clay, coral and shell, but these have been replaced by commercially produced beads. It is from these masks that the modern practice of covering wooden sculptures of snakes, dolls, small animals, jaguar heads and other forms is derived.

Nearika are highly decorated ceremonial objects that can be circular or diamond-shaped. When Carl Lumholtz did his writing on the Huichol, he named the circular ones "frontal shields" and the diamond-shaped ones as "eyes" and giving rise to the concept of the "God's eyes," applied to a Huichol cross. Nearika are tablets of wood or bamboo which are heavily decorated placed into certain sacred areas. Often they focus on a face of a sun, moon or person. From these the new tradition of yarn paintings developed, and the most traditional of these still show the round face of Tau, the Sun, in the middle.

== Huichol decorative designs ==
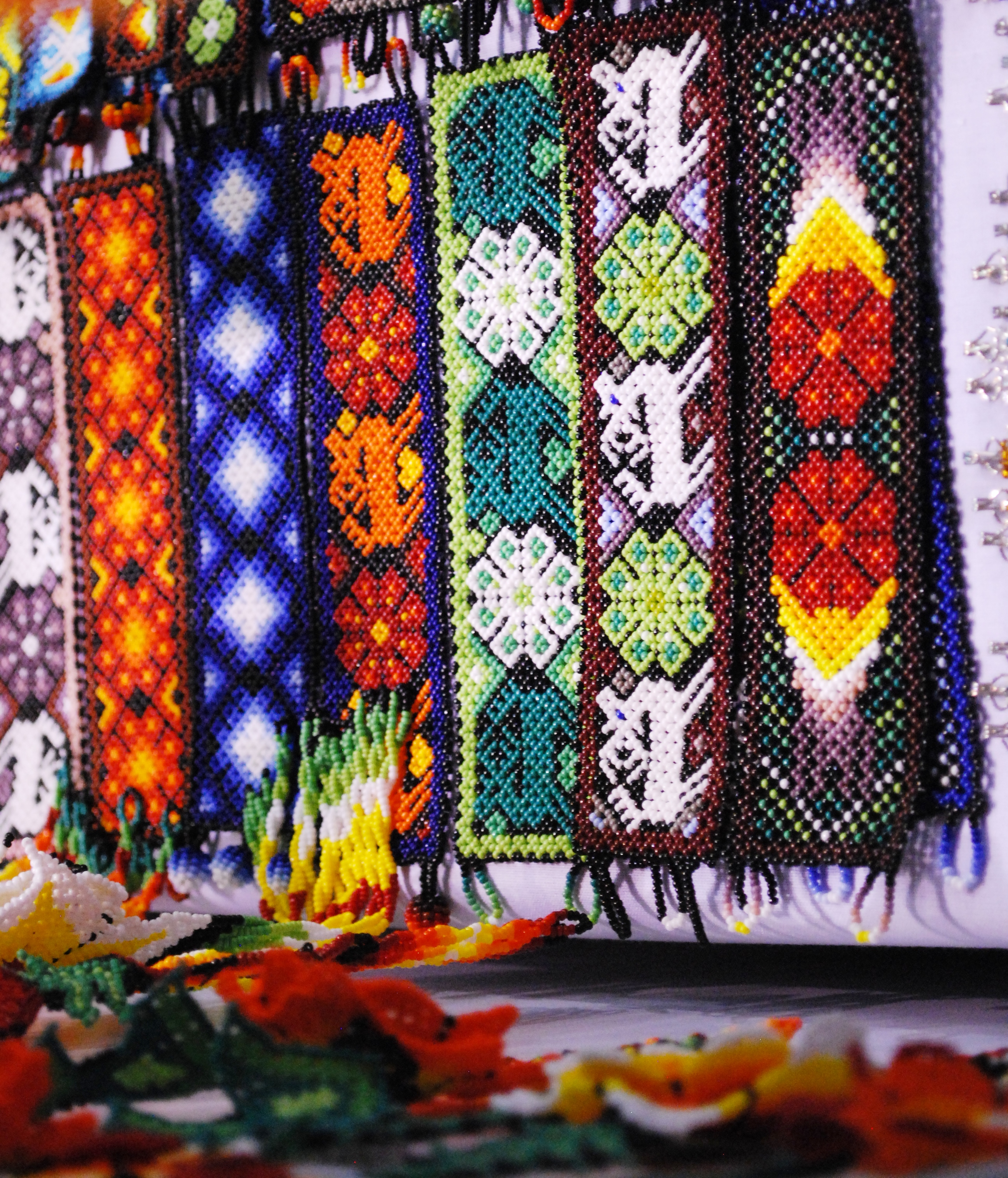
Huichol beadwork for sale at the annual FONART exposition in Mexico City

Most Huichol patterns and designs have religious and cultural significance. These patterns can be found on a wide variety of objects including carved and beaded on masks, gourds, musical instruments and embroidered on clothing objects such as belts, sashes, side bags, and more. Most have religious significance and many are influenced by visions which occur during peyote rituals. Much of what is known about Huichol designs and symbols was put together by Norwegian explorer and ethnographer Carl Lumholtz in the late 19th century, but Huichol art and decoration has since become more varied. However, plant and animal motifs remain the most common and most retain their original meaning.

When ceremonial or religious items are made, all aspects of the making from materials to colors to designs are important as they are identified with particular gods and meanings. Mesquite and the color reddish brown belong to Tatewari, who is of the earth and the wood of the Brazil tree is related to Tayuapa or "Father Sun." Symbols such as the golden eagle and macaws are related to Tatewari. Shapes such as the deer, coyote, pine tree or whirlwind can be associated with Tamat's Kauyumari, who shaped the world. The salate tree, the armadillo and the bear are associated with Takutzi Nakahue, the mother of all gods and of corn. The toto is a small white flower with five petals associated with the rainy season. Sashes and belts often have designs that mimic the markings on the backs of snakes, which are also associated with rain, along with good crops, health and long life. The zigzag lines that emanate from all living things represent communication with the deities. The butterfly motif is reminiscent of the Itzpapolotl or Obsidian Butterfly, a principal deity of the classical Aztecs.

The most common motifs are related to the three most important elements in Huichol religion, the deer, corn and peyote. The first two are important as primary sources of food, and the last is valued for its hallucinogenic properties which give shamans visions.

== Exhibitions of Huichol art ==
Most outsiders’ experience with Huichol artwork comes from visiting areas such as Guadalajara and Puerto Vallarta and seeing the work being sold. These vendors are mostly Huichol women who come into these cities from rural villages.

The artwork varies greatly in size, with some as large as murals. In 2010, the Institute of the Americas at the University of California, San Diego, held an exhibit of Huichol art targeting tourists who visit the west coast of Mexico, especially those who traveled by boat.

The Museo de Arte Popular in Mexico City held a temporary exhibit in 2009 comparing the art of the Huichol people with that of the aborigines of northern Australia entitled "Magica huichol: rito aborigen" ("Huichol Magic: Aborigine Ritual"). The aim was not to show any historical connection but rather to show the similarity of style between two disparate cultures.

The art gallery Arte Marakame has a permanent exhibition of huichol art made with crystal beads and yarn painting, also as a fusion of huichol art and Alebrije from Oaxaca, in Morelia, Michoacan, Mexico.

The Bead Museum in Glendale, Arizona, held an exhibit called "The HuicholWeb of Life: Creation and Prayer".

Huichol work has been commissioned for public display. There is a permanent display of twelve Huichol murals at the Lindbergh International Airport at Terminal 3. A Huichol bead mural was commissioned for the Paris Métro at the Palais Royal-Musee de Louvre station. It was donated by the Mexico City Metro to France, as a returned favor for the Art Nouveau Bellas Artes station entrance which was donated by France to Mexico. The work is called "Huichol Thought and Soul" and measures 2.4 by 3 meters in total divided into 80 panels of 30 cm by 30 cm, created by artist Santos de la Torre.

One of the most recent commissioned works is the "Vochol," a Volkswagen Beetle which was covered in Huichol designs using 2,277,000 beads fastened to the body of the car using a special heat-resistant resin. The car was commissioned by the Association of Friends of the Museo de Arte Popular and other public and private enterprises to be auctioned off to benefit Mexican artisans.

Huichol yarn painting
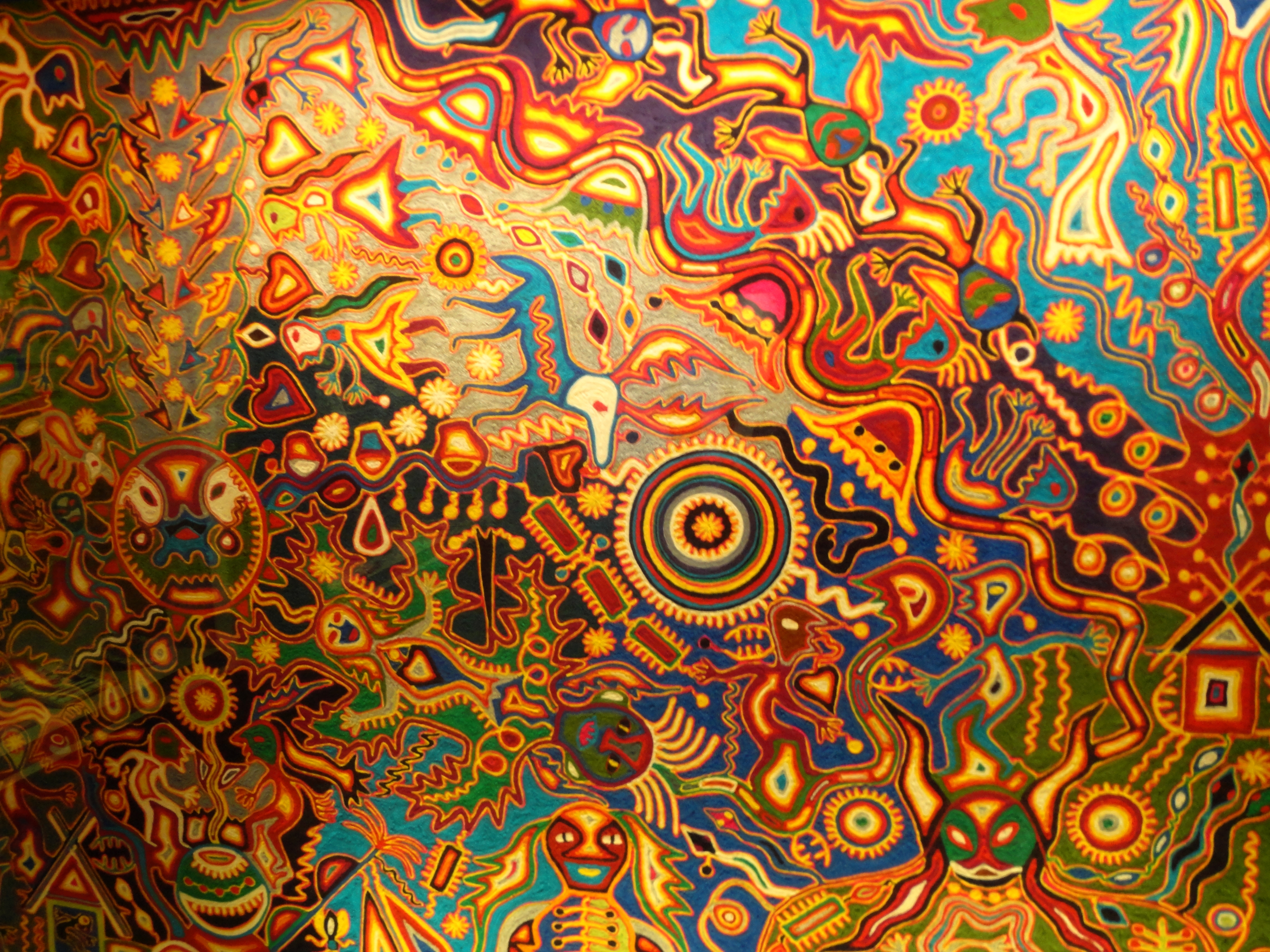

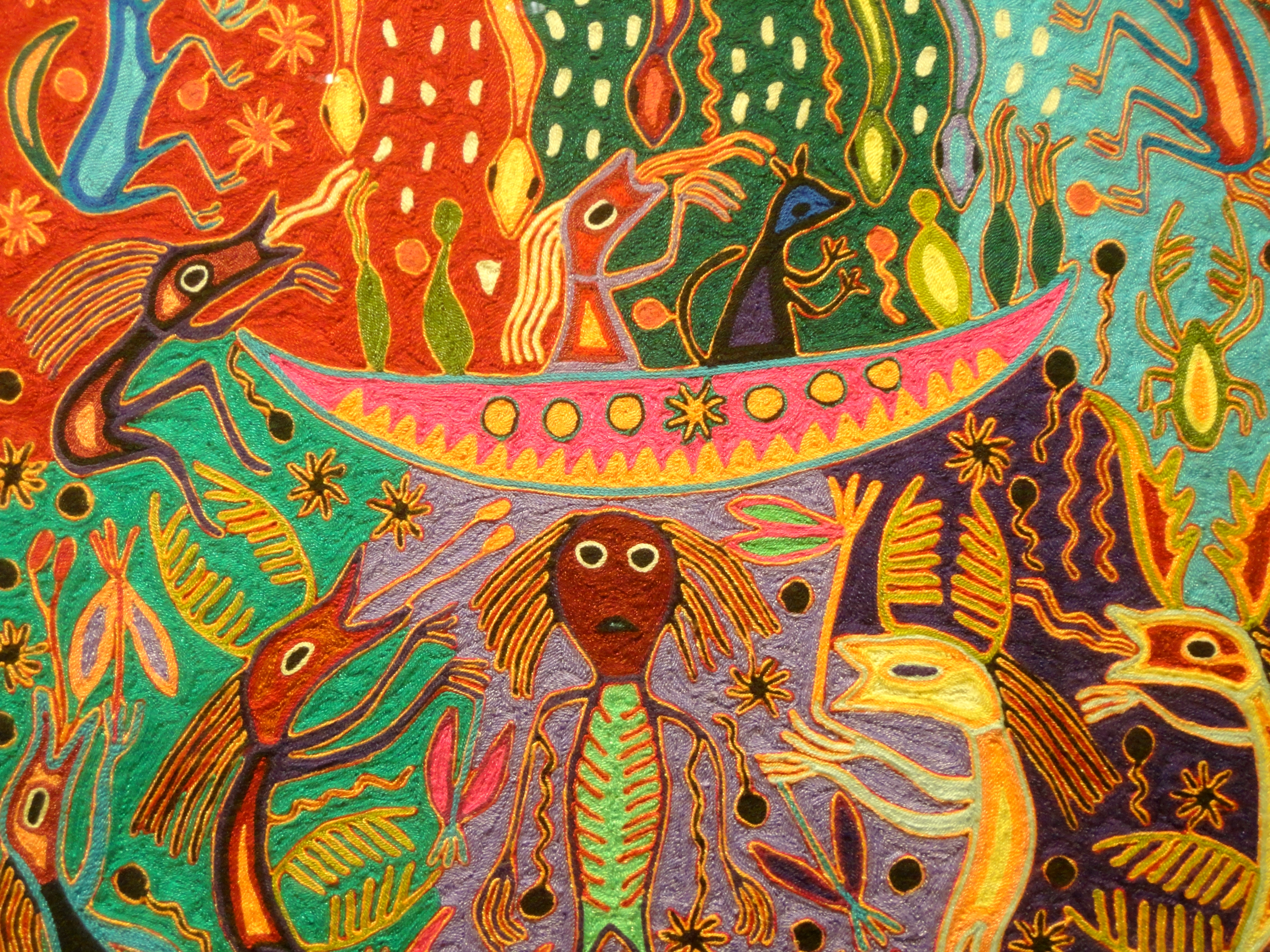

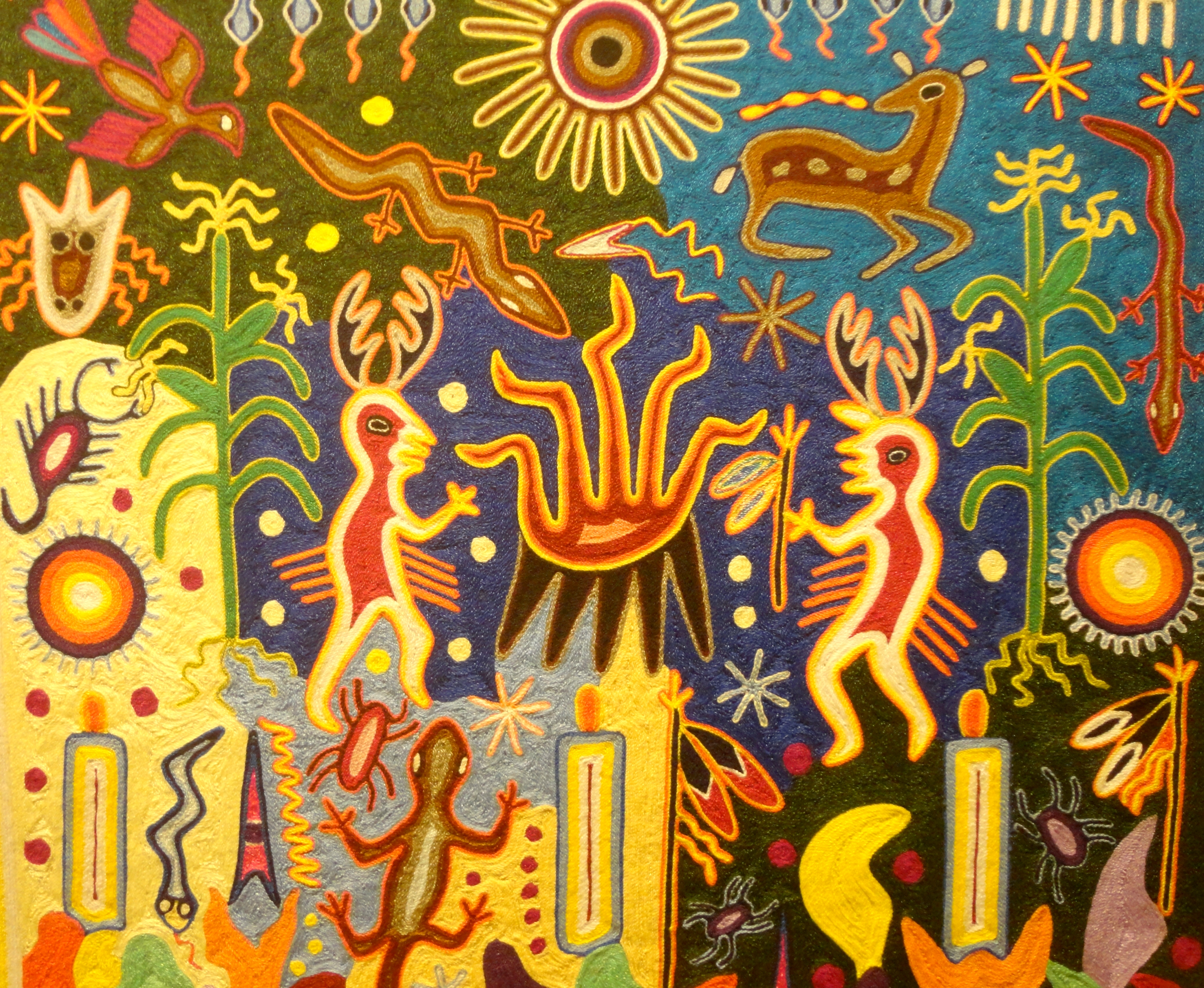

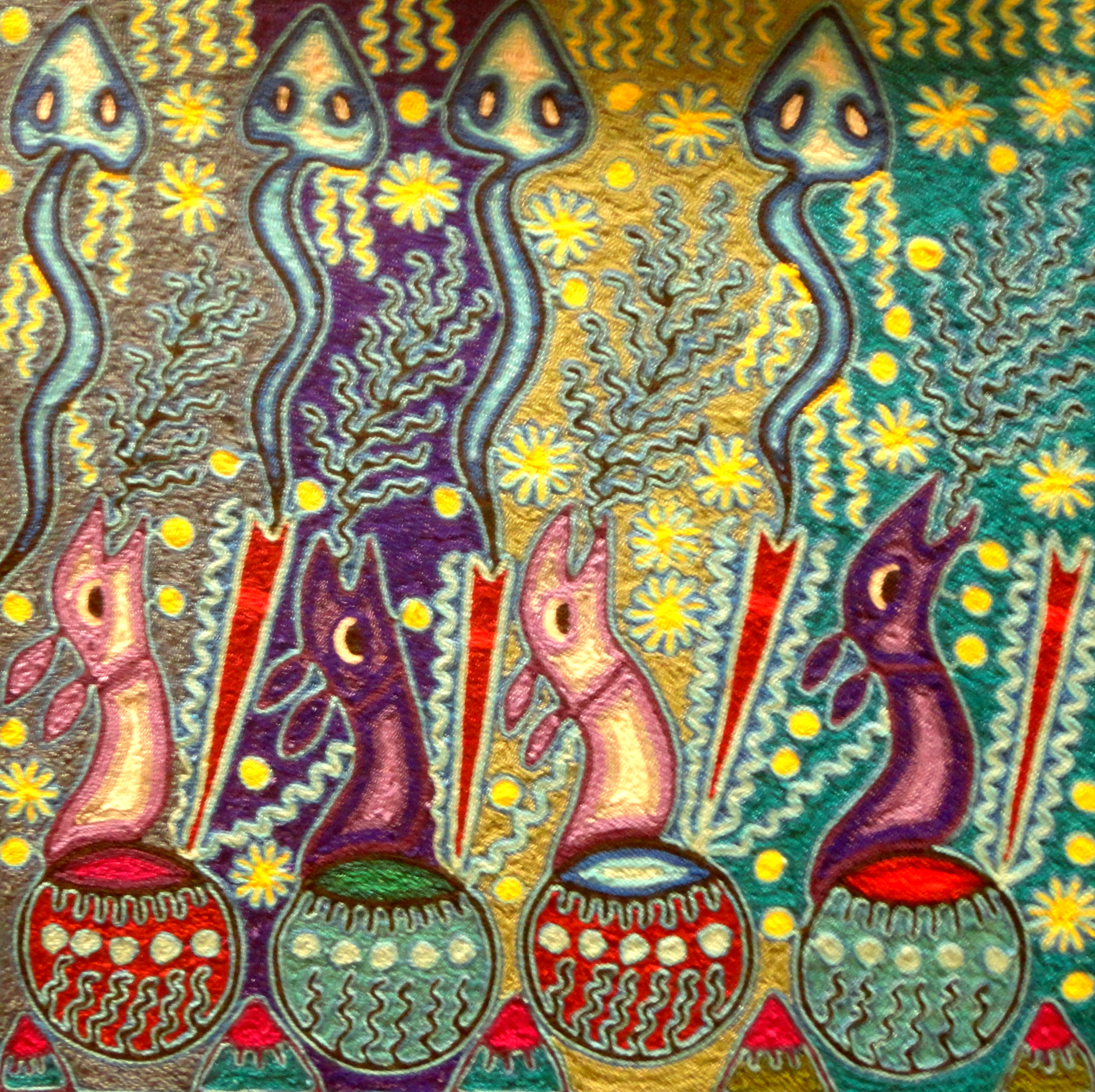

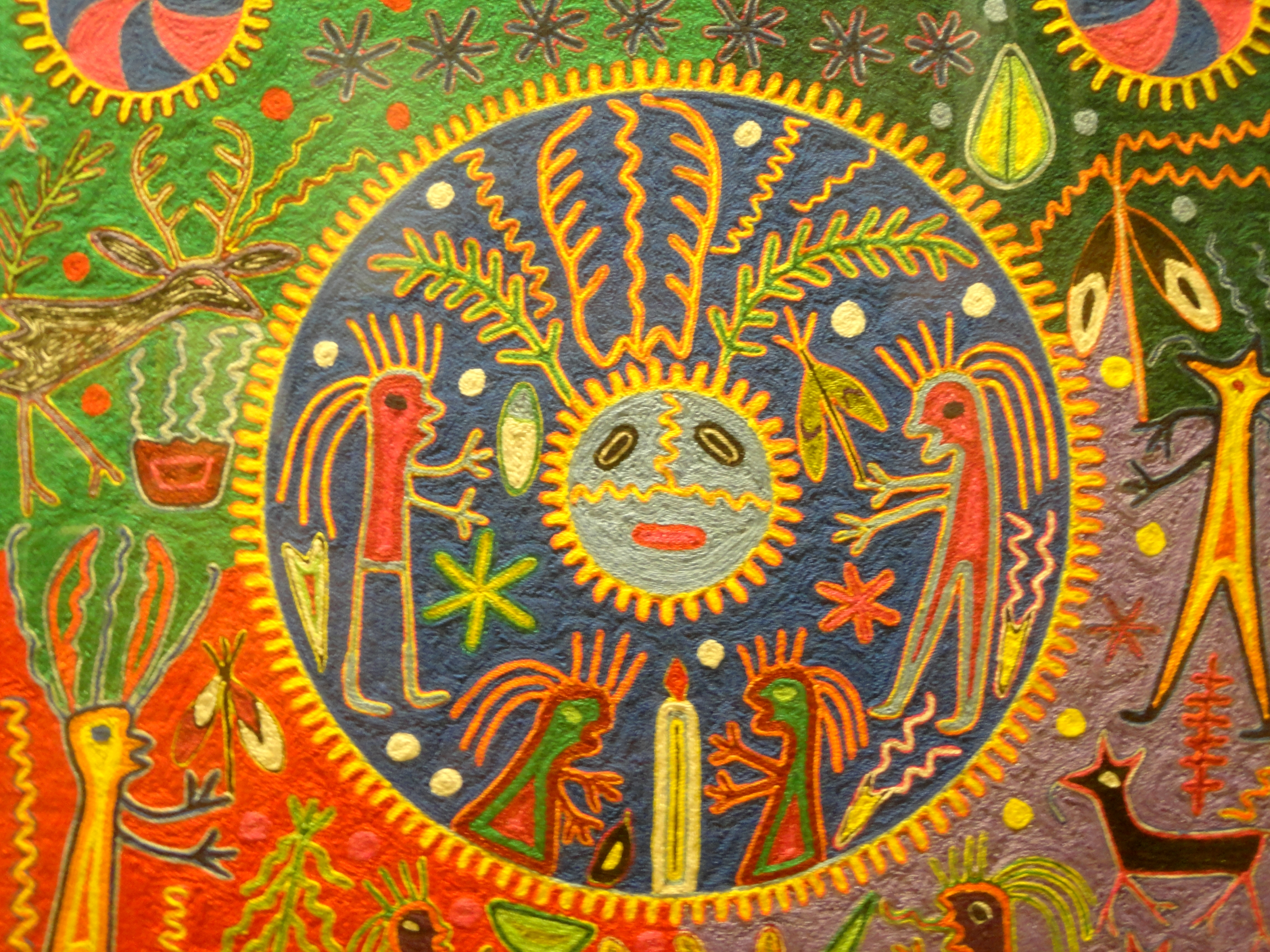
