= Santos de la Torre =

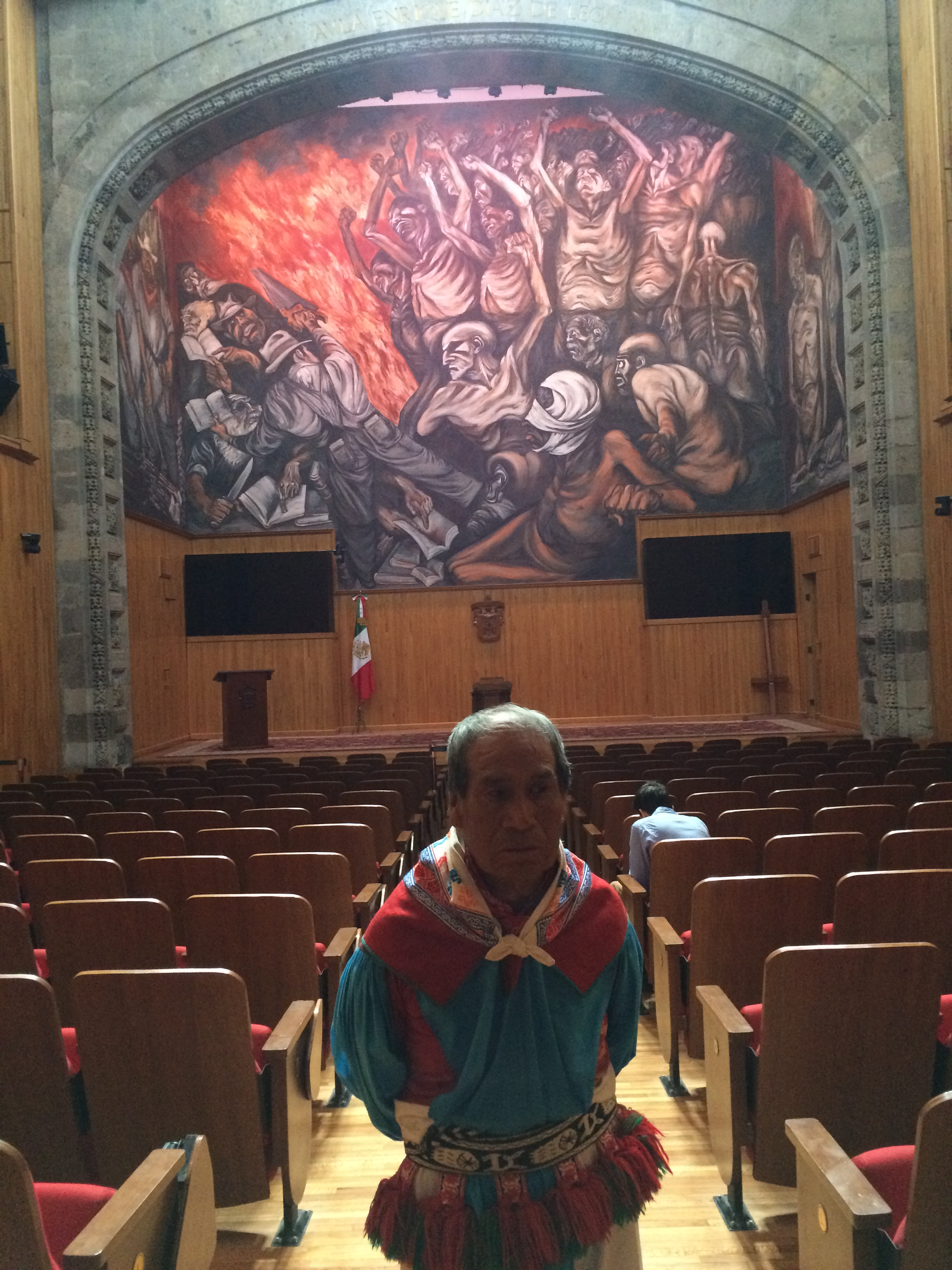
- De la Torre in front of the mural "The people and their false leaders", by José Clemente Orozco
- Born: Santa Catarina Cuexcomatitlan, Jalisco, Mexico
- Occupation: Huichol artist
- Spouse: Graciela de Santigo
- Writing career
- Language: Huichol, Spanish
- Genre: Artist

Santos Motoapohua de la Torre (born April 28, 1942 in Santa Catarina Cuexcomatitlán, Jalisco) is one of the most world renowned Huichol artists. His works aim to capture the mystery and magnificence of the Wixárika (Huichol people) and their spiritual beliefs. His main works are displayed in Paris, Chicago, Zacatecas and Nayarit. His Huichol name, "Motoapohua", translates to "Echo of the mountain".

== Career ==
When he was young, Santos de la Torre lived in poverty. On his conversations with Mexican writer Fernando Alarriba, he described his first experience with Hikuri (peyote), where he found a mystic reality that he gradually understood with the help of his father, a Mara'akame (Huichol Chaman) that guided him in the interpretation of his visions and dreams.

His artistic career started at 23 years old, at the pinnacle of Huichol contemporary art portrayed globally by artists like José Benítez Sánchez and Tutukila Carrillo Sandoval. His brother, Jesus, asked him to travel to Mexico City to sell arts and crafts and learn basic techniques of Huichol art crafting. It was in Mexico City where young Santos learned Spanish and began the creation of works based on personal designs. In 1968 he met John C. Lilly and his wife Colette, who were mesmerized by his work. They bought his first works and asked him for more information about the enigmatic Huichol culture. Santos agreed to take them to the community of Santa Catarina, where the couple made a crucial documentary task for expanding and protecting Huichol culture internationally at the top of the psicodelia culture.

With Lilly's protection, the artist met architect Eduardo Terrazas who invited him to collaborate with team of Huichol artists that took part on creating an identity logo for the 1968 Summer Olympics. His collaboration continued for various years and it allowed him to take part in contemporary art projects like Tablas, which took places at Palacio de Bellas Artes in 1972, in which Terrazas made a visual exploration of geometric structures inspired on Huichol art. At the end of the 70's he made a series of woodblocks with yarn, symbol of the SAHOP under the leadoff architect Pedro Ramirez Vazquez.

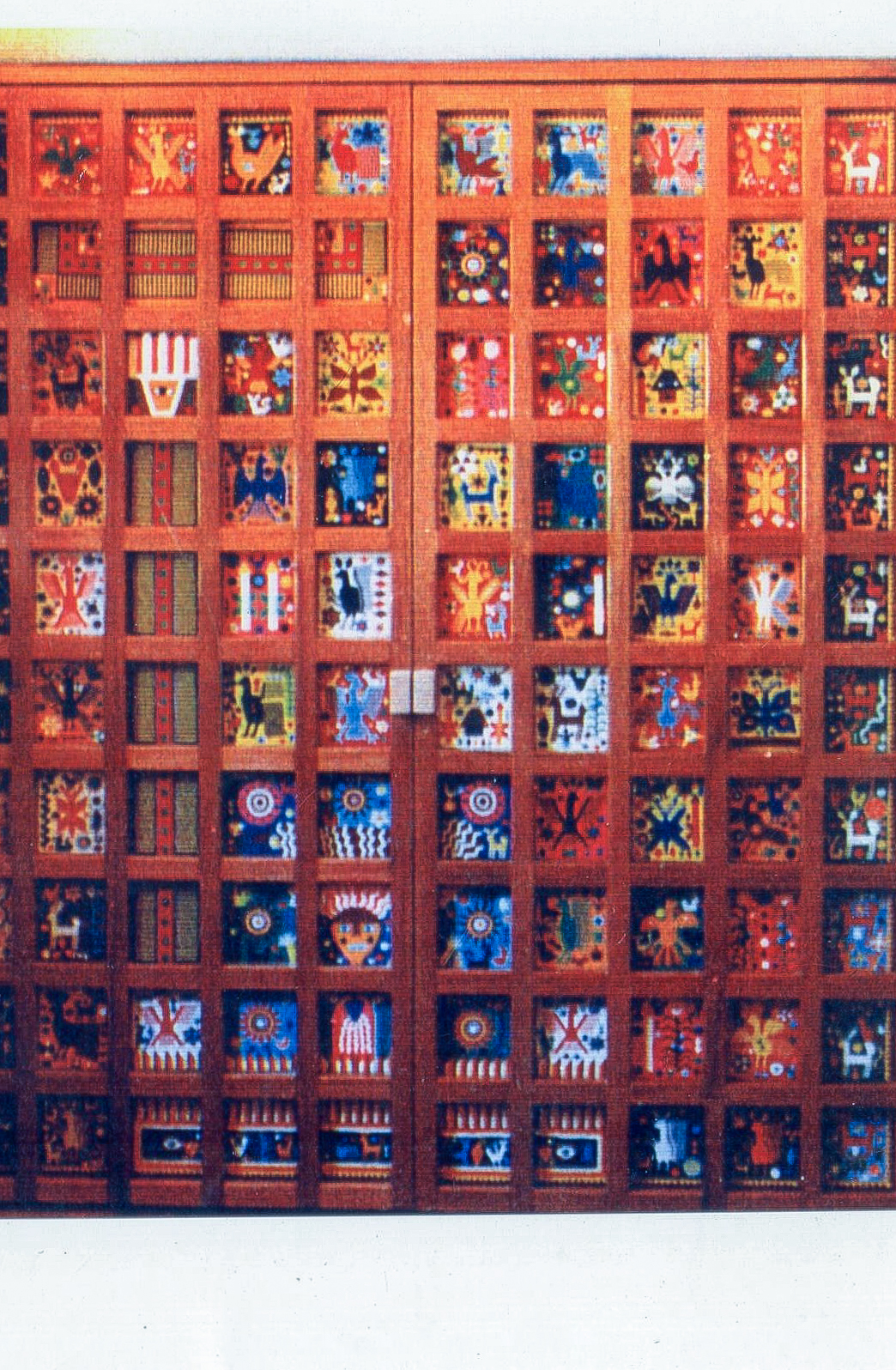
"Sound of music". This work is the basis of the monumental murals of maestro Santos de la Torre.

Santos de la Torre's life in Mexico City allowed him observe the enormous value of the art of his ethnic group, nationally and internationally. However, he came into a big leap of uncertainty and repulsion due to the exploitation towards Huichol artists and craftsmen that took him to isolate at the heart of Jalisco's Sierra and stop creating art for almost 10 years.

After a great deal of time working in the fields, Santos started looking for new ways of expressions, leading him to create new artworks. These groundbreaking works of his demonstrated a deep experience when it came to the myths, Gods, ancestors, and principles that created the Huichol cosmogony. This is how he and his family created Sonido de Musico, composed by 100 pieces of 15 x 15 cm that would become the mark of murals that made his career on a global level. In 1993 he obtained resources from the Programa de Fomento a Proyectos y Coinversiones Culturales del Fondo Nacional para la Cultura y las Artes with his work Misterio y viaje de los tres espíritus sagrados.

After this work came Pensamiento y alma Huichol (1997) located at the Palais-Royal Musée du Louvre station in Paris; Visión de un mundo místico (2001) located at Museo Zacatecano; El nuevo amanecer (2003) which belongs to the “Folk art" collection at the National Museum of Mexican Art in Chicago; Eco de la montaña (Echo of the Mountain) (2014), centerpiece of Nicolas Echavarria's documentary, and Diosa madre del caballo, Xotori K`kyari (2016), at the Hotel Playa Tierra Tropical located in San Francisco, Rivera Nayarit.

In 2016 he exhibited his work in Mazatlán, which seek establishing a dialog between the Huichol people and the Haida people, from Canada, through art. He has also shown his work in Zacatecas and Mexico City.

In 2017, the Congress of the State of Jalisco gave him the Order “José Clemente Orozco" for his distinguished work in the painting field. Nowadays, Santos de la Torre continues creating arts at small, medium and grand format, and also maintains, along his family, a crafts workshop.

== Meaning of his work ==
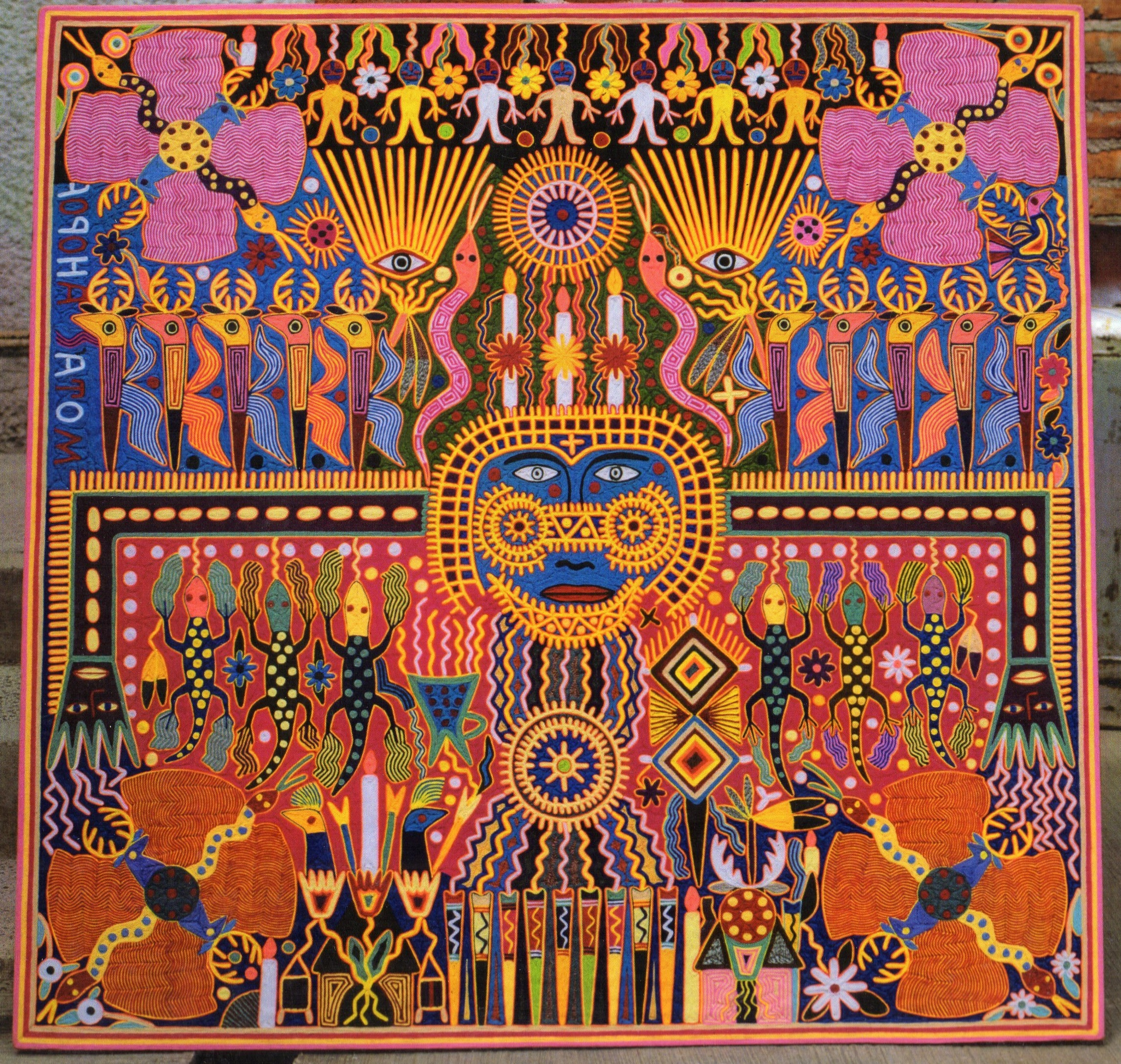
"God of the deers", work of Santos de la Torre made in stamen technique on triplay and Campeche wax.

Santos de la Torre was the object of interviews and articles in 2014 (from the Prize of the Press that the film Eco de la montaña received at the 29th Festival Internacional de Cine en Guadalajara) in which he explained that his murals should be seen from bottom to top, like trees grow, and that making one took about eight months.

He uses Czech beads made from glass, pine wood as a base and Campeche wax as glue. However, far from his technical mastery in crafting with these and other materials, the artist considers that the highlight of his work is due to an insatiable search for expressing his experiences and knowledge about the Huichol culture.

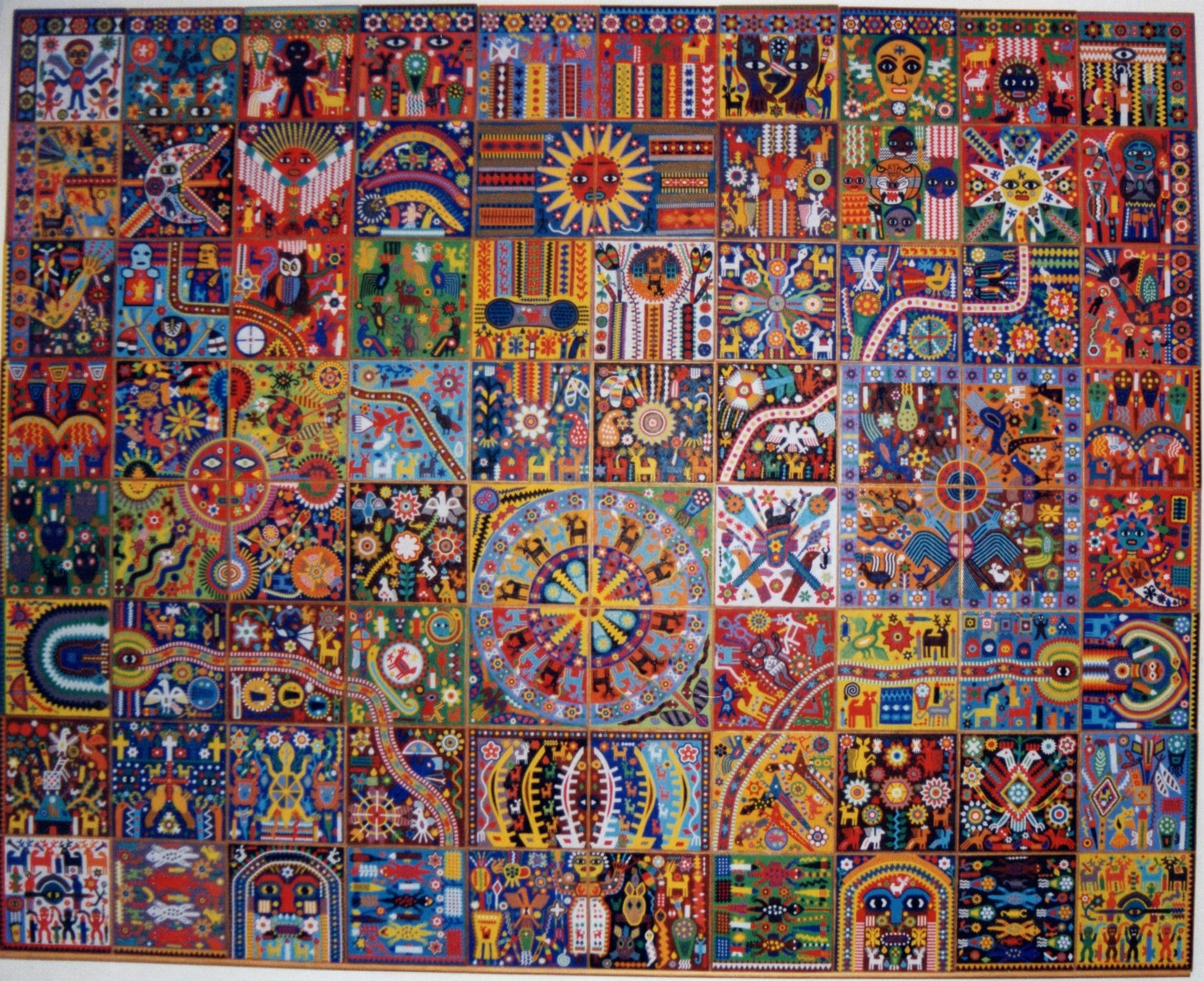
Mural, "Misión de un mundo místico".

De la Torre has gone on pilgrimages in all sacred territories of the Wixárika people, and bases his work in personal visions like on explanations about rituals and chants of the Mara´akames; since his youth he has practiced meditation, dream interpretation, and stayed close to the ancestral memory of the Huichol community thru the use of peyote. On his interviews with Fernando Alarriba, the artist pointed that the mission of the Huichol art consists in offering a close up to the roots of sacred deities of life that manifest and have been immortalized since memorial times in rituals, shamanic chants, ceremonies and artistic expressions of his community.

== Palais-Royal Huichol mural ==
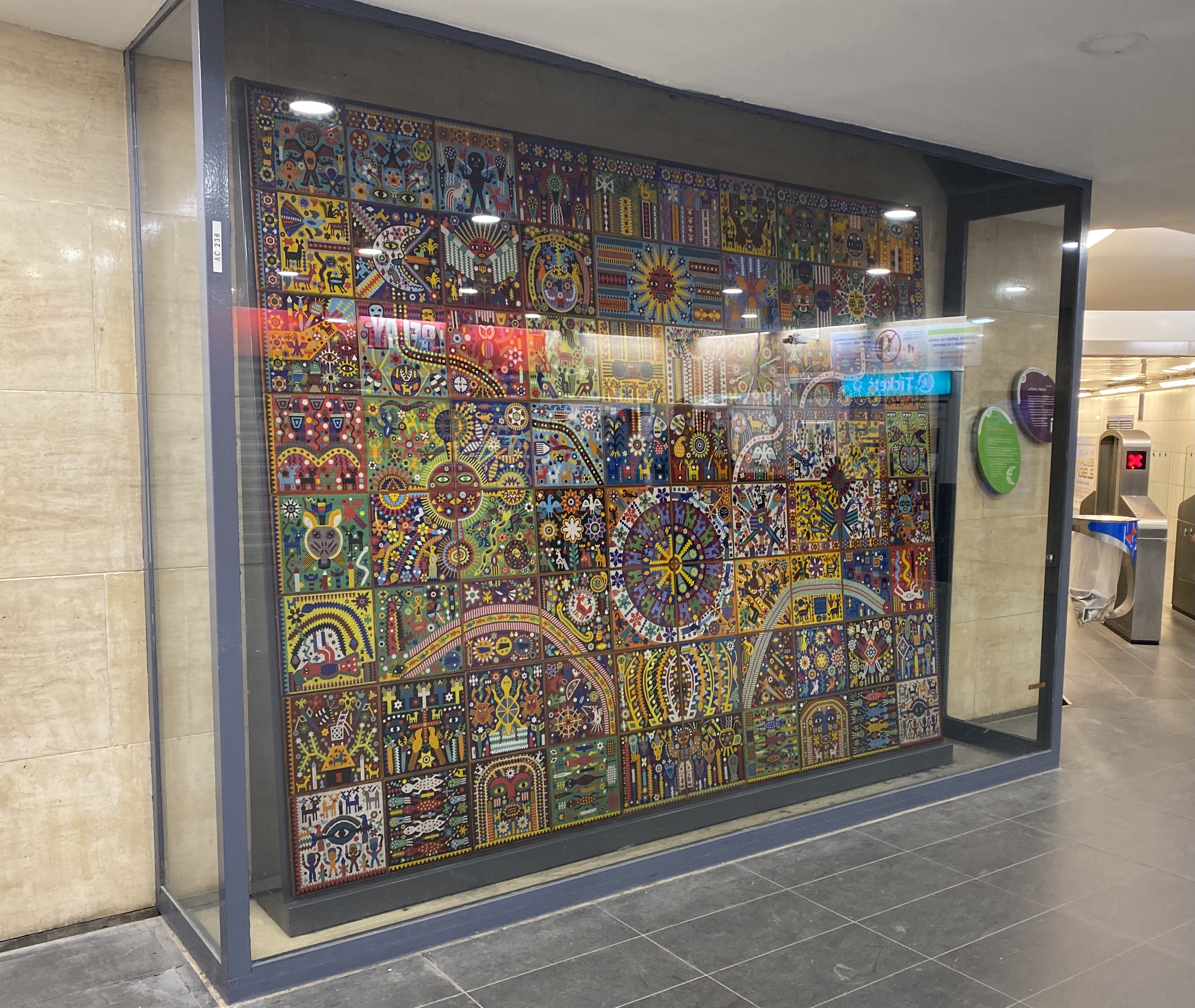
The mural at the station

Pensamiento y alma Huichol was created in 1997 Palais Royal-Musée du Louvre station as part of the RATP Group - Mexico City Metro alliance. This is his most renowned and talked about work, which represents Huichol deities, ancestors, myths, flora and fauna on a horizontal tripctic of the underground, the earth and the sky. The work is composed by 80 boards and elaborated with two million beads of two millimeters apiece. It is located at the Palais-Royal Musée du Louvre towards the Carrousel du Louvre. On this work, researcher Miguel Gleason comments on his book México insólito en Europa: “Its perhaps the most impressive and detailed work in Europe, composed by more of two million beads that shows the cosmogony of that community (Huichol people)".

Despite the international renown of this work, Santos de la Torre didn't receive the payment agreed by the Government of Mexico during the presidency of Ernesto Zedillo, nor was he invited to the inauguration of this mural, plus this was not installed the way it should be, being fixed later.

Filmarker Nicolas Echavarria took this incident at the beginning of Eco de la montaña, a film focused on the elaboration of a new mural that works like a trip to the spectator to dive into the rituals, beliefs, symbols and visions of the Huichol community. Thanks to this film, Santos de la Torre was again the center of attention of Mexican art and allowed him to travel to places like UAE and Germany, expanding the list of countries that have welcomed thanks to his work that also include France and India.
