= Agenzia Fides =

News agency of the Vatican

Agenzia Fides Logo

Agenzia Fides is the missionary news agency of the Vatican. It is based in the Palazzo di Propaganda Fide in Rome, and is part of the Congregation for the Evangelization of Peoples. The image archive of the agency includes about 10,000 photographs documenting the history of Catholic missions during the years from 1930 to 1990.

== History ==
Agenzia Fides was formed on 5 June 1927, as the first missionary news agency of the Roman Catholic Church and was approved by Pope Pius XI. The agency started to issue editions in English, French and Polish (the latter only for a short period) followed by those in Italian (1929), Spanish (1930), German (1932), Chinese (1998), Portuguese (2002) and Arabic (2008). Since 1998 Fides Service went online with up to five reports daily concerning non-European events. Its homepage includes statistical information and details of missionaries who have been killed.

In 2011, the director David Niño de Guzmán was found dead. While the official explanation from investigators pointed to suicide, family, friends and co-workers questioned this finding and believed his death was murder.

The current director is Prof. Luca de Mata.

== See also ==
- List of news agencies
- Luciano Alimandi
