= Esperanza (Charles Aznavour song) =

1961 song by Charles Aznavour

"Esperanza" is a 1961 hit song by Charles Aznavour with French lyrics written by Aznavour after the original instrumental composition by Ramón Cabrera Argotes. The Aznavour version commences "Esperanza, esperanza, le bonheur en nos coeurs...".

The Spanish original also achieved popularity in its own right particularly the Spanish-language version by Nino de Murcia, but the French version of Aznavour was successful even in Spanish speaking countries.

== Versions ==
- António Machin
- Digno Garcia 1970
- Enrique Montoya 1959
- Nino de Murcia 1961
- Johnny Forsell, Finland 1962
- Los Machucambos 1962
- Los Matecoco 1962
- Orera 1962
- Radmila Karaklajić 1963
- Ralf Carsten, German lyrics by Loose 1962
- Manuel de Gomez y su Orquesta Tipica 1963
- Ping Ping (Al Verlane and his Montebello's) 1962
- Orchestre Des Champs Elysées 1966
- Les Scarlet
- Charlie Level et Les Carnaval's
- Didier Boland et L'Orchestre Des Rois Avec Les "Gilles Choeurs" PBM France
