= Nilo (name) =

Nilo is both a given name and a surname. Also the Italian, Portuguese and Spanish pronunciation of the Nile river. Notable people with the name include:

Given name:

- Nilo Acuña, professional footballer who played in Uruguay
- Nilo Alcala, Filipino composer, arranger, and singer
- Nilo Alves da Cunha, Brazilian footballer
- Nilo Carretero, Argentine footballer
- Nilo Cruz, Cuban-American playwright and pedagogue
- Nilo Floody, Chilean modern pentathlete
- Nilo Guimarães, São Toméan businessman and politician
- Nilo Murtinho Braga, Brazilian footballer
- Nilo Peçanha, Brazilian politician
- Nilo Pereira, Brazilian journalist and teacher
- Nilo da Silva, Brazilian modern pentathlete

Surname:

- Joy Nilo, Filipino composer
- Humberto Nilo, director of the University of Chile school of arts
- Prisco Nilo, Filipino meteorologist

== See also ==
- Nilo (disambiguation)
- Niño (name)
- Nino (name)
