= Mario Lavista =

Mexican composer, writer, and intellectual (1943–2021)

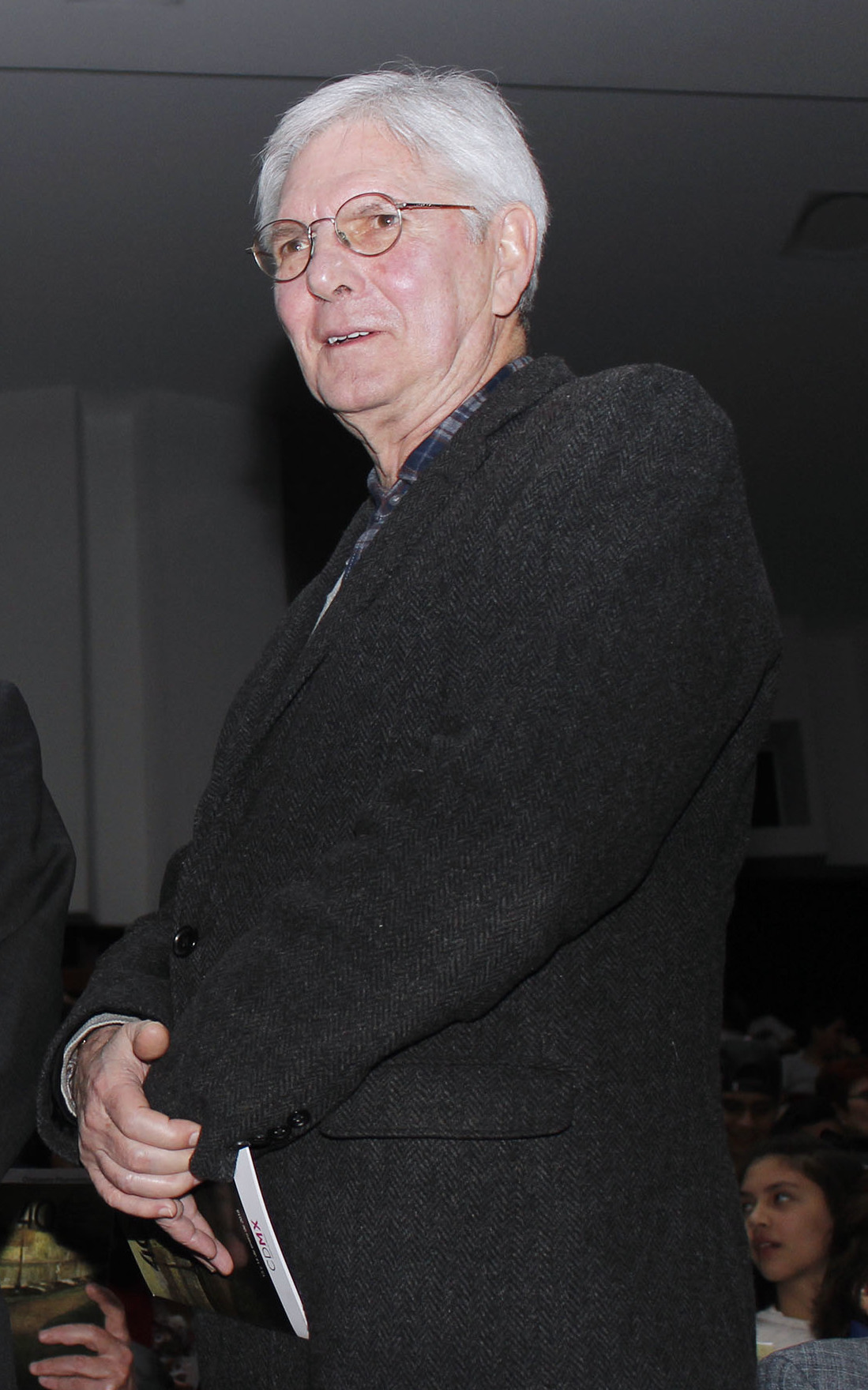
Lavista in 2018

Mario Lavista (April 3, 1943 – November 4, 2021) was a Mexican composer, writer and intellectual.

== Life and career ==
Lavista was born in Mexico City. He enrolled in the Composition Workshop (Taller de Composición) at the National Conservatory in 1963, under the guidance of Carlos Chávez, Héctor Quintanar, and Rodolfo Halffter. In 1967 he received a scholarship from the French government to study at the Schola Cantorum in Paris, where he studied with Jean-Étienne Marie. During his time in Europe, he attended courses by Henri Pousseur, Nadia Boulanger, Christoph Caskel, and Karlheinz Stockhausen.

In 1970 he founded Quanta, a collective improvisation group. He also worked at the electronic music studios of Tokyo radio and television in 1972. At the end of the 1970s and beginning of the 1980s he closely collaborated with renowned performers in solo and chamber works where he explored unusual timbre possibilities by the use of extended techniques. In 1982, he founded Pauta, one of the most important music journals in Latin America, and continued to serve as its chief editor. In 1987, he received a Guggenheim Fellowship for his first (and only) opera Aura, based on the short story by Carlos Fuentes. Aura premiered in 1988 at the Palacio de Bellas Artes in Mexico City.

Lavista approached religious genres in a series of compositions where he used Medieval and Renaissance procedures, such as the symbolic use of certain intervals, canonic permutations, and isorhythm, most evident in the Missa ad Consolationis Dominam Nostram, a central work in his oeuvre.

He received multiple awards and honors: Premio Nacional de Ciencias y Artes and the Medalla Mozart in 1991, an honorable mention from the Sistema Nacional de Creadores del Fondo Nacional para la Cultura y las Artes in 1993, and membership in the prestigious El Colegio Nacional since 1998. Lavista’s works are frequently performed in Europe and throughout the Americas, where he travelled regularly to give lectures and seminars in composition. Since 1970 he taught music analysis and composition at the National Conservatory in Mexico City. Additionally, he was visiting professor at the University of Chicago, Cornell University, the University of California San Diego, Indiana University, McGill University, University of North Texas, and The University of New Mexico.

He composed incidental music for plays, film scores (mostly in conjunction with Nicolás Echevarría), orchestral pieces, and vocal music.

In 2013, Lavista won the Tomás Luis de Victoria Composition Prize, the foremost recognition for musical creativity for Ibero-American composers.

== Music ==
=== Chamber works ===
- Antifonia, mixed quintet
- Cante, guitar ensemble
- Canto del Alba, flute solo
- Cinco Danzas Breves, woodwind quintet
- Cuaderno de Viaje, viola or violoncello solo
- Danza de las Bailarinas de Degas, flute and keyboard
- Diacronia, string quartet
- Dialogos, violin and keyboard
- Elegia (a la muerte de Nacho), flute and keyboard
- Gargantua, string quartet and woodwind ensemble
- Lacrymosa, chamber orchestra
- Marsias, oboe and ensemble
- Natarayah, guitar solo
- Quotations, violoncello and keyboard
- Reflejos de la Noche, string orchestra or string quartet
- Responsorio in Memoriam Rodolfo Halffter, bassoon and ensemble
- String Quartet No. 6
- Tres Danzas Seculares, violoncello and keyboard

=== Orchestral works ===
- Sinfonia Modal
- Cello Concerto
- Clepsidra
- Ficciones
- Hacia el Comienzo, medium voice and ensemble
- Lyhannh

=== Songs ===
- Dos Canciones, medium voice and piano

=== Solo keyboard ===
- Mater Dolorosa, organ solo
- Pieza Para un Pianista y un Piano, piano solo
- Simurg, piano solo

== Sources ==
- Alonso-Minutti, Ana R. (2008). "Resonances of Sound, Text, and Image in the Music of Mario Lavista." Ph.D. Diss. Davis: University of California, Davis.
- Aharonian, Coriún (2000). An Approach to Compositional Trends in Latin America, International Society for the Arts, Sciences and Technology (ISAST).
- Cortez, Luis Jaime (1988). Mario Lavista: Textos en torno a la música, Mexico City: CENIDIM.
- Delgado, Eugenio (1993). "El lenguaje musical de Aura", Heterofonía, vol. 26, no. 108 (January–June): pp. 45-51. Mexico City: CENIDIM.
- Orellana, Joaquín (1977). "Hacia un lenguaje propio de Latinoamérica en música actual". Alero, third quarter, no. 24 (Guatemala City, May–June 1977).
