= José Benítez Sánchez =

Wixárika (Huichol) Mexican artist (1938-2009)

- Yucaye Kukame
- Born: August 17, 1938; San Pablo, El Nayar, Nayarit
- Died: July 1, 2009 (aged 70); Tepic, Nayarit
- Known for: Painting
- Notable work: Tatutsi Xuweri Timaiweme
- Style: Yarn painting
- Awards: National Prize for Arts 2003

José Benítez Sánchez, also known as Yucaye Kukame (San Pablo, El Nayar, Nayarit, August 17, 1938 - Tepic, Nayarit, July 1, 2009), was a Wixárika or Huichol artist. His yarn paintings have being exhibited in numerous galleries and museums in the United States, Canada, Japan, and Europe. He is considered one of best exponents of the Huichol art form of yarn painting.

The technique used in his paintings involves coating flat wooden boards with a sticky beeswax adhesive called Campeche wax, then placing thick and thin wool yarn of vibrant colors on top.

== Life ==
The artist was born in San Pablo, Mesa del Jueroche, Municipality of El Nayar, Nayarit. According to his people's tradition, he was named Yucauye Kukame, which means 'Silent Walker', and, like his ancestors, he was raised to be a mara'akame, or shaman. At age 16 he left his Huichol community to work as a day laborer on the coast of Nayarit. It was there that he learned to speak Spanish and Mexican culture.

He worked as a sweeper in the offices of the National Indigenist Institute in Tepic, under Salomón Nahmad, (Note: Salomón Nahmad is a renowned anthropologist. He is also a National Arts Prize recipient, but from 2018.) who encouraged him to start making art. Nahmad also promoted Benítez to handcraft caretaker and purchaser, and asked him to go to Huichol communities to promote handcraft making.

In the 1960s, he worked as a street sweeper and, eventually, as a translator for the government in the most remote Huichol communities. He studied yarn painting as an apprentice of Ramón Medina Silva, who improved his technique.

He began making his first yarn paintings in 1963 in a workshop he set up in Comala.

In 1968, he was known as a representative of Huichol culture, so he was asked to dance and played his people's music with the xaweri (violin) during the 1968 Mexico Olympic Games.

Alongside his workshop activities, he worked at the Coordinating Center of the Huichol Cora and Tepehuano Plan, choosing authentic crafts from the indigenous peoples of the region.

In 1971, Benítez acted as a link between the Mexican government and indigenous artisans selling crafts through government offices.

Yarn paintings quickly became a commercial success, and Benítez's work gained international recognition.

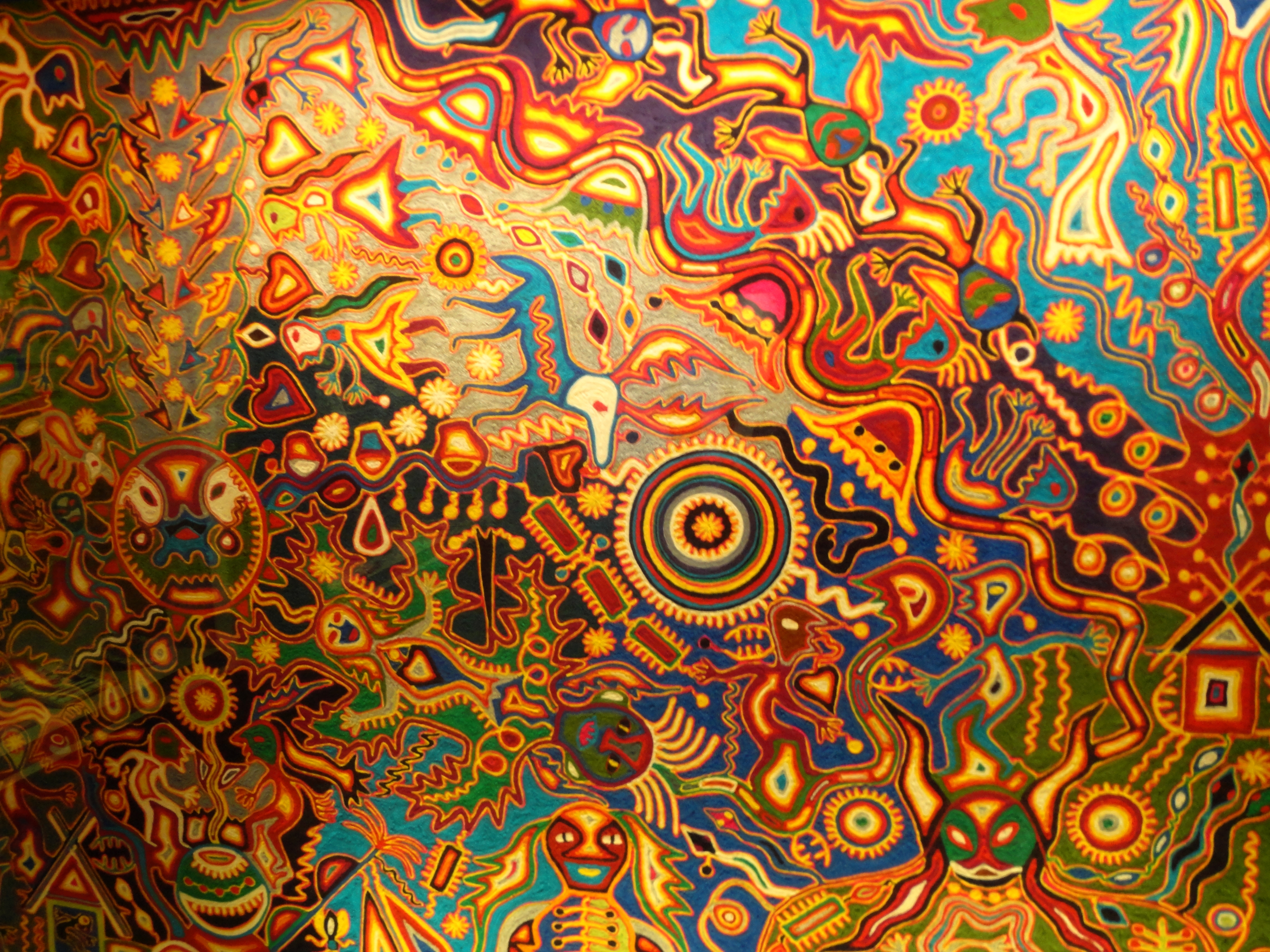
«Tatutsi Xuweri Timaiweme» in the Anthropology and History Museum

In the 1970s, Juan Negrín who was studying the Huichol culture, promoted Benítez and his art by arranging public exhibitions of Benítez's work. In the 1970s and 1980s, a growing Mexican and international excitement about Huichol arts was fostered by gallery and museum exhibitions. An exhibition of Huichol art was held in 1975–1976 in California (Sacramento and San José). The exhibition was curated by Juan Negrín Fetter and featured work by José Benítez Sánchez (Huichol name: Yucauye Kukame) and Tutukila (Spanish name: Tiburcio Carrillo Carrillo). Negrín mounted further exhibitions in Guadalajara, Mexico City, and Europe and published several books, articles, and catalogues featuring Benítez, Tutukila, Juan Ríos Martínez, Guadalupe González Ríos, and Pablo Taisan (Huichol name: Yauxali); for descriptions of these exhibitions, see the accounts by Negrín (1975, 1977, 1979, 1985, 1986).

Benítez taught his art form to several Huichol apprentices, including Juan Ruiz Martínez, who later developed a particular style.

In 1972, he founded the Zitakua huichol community.

He resumed the shamanic tradition that he had interrupted, making several pilgrimages through the land of his people, in the mountains, the desert, and the coast. These long absences renewed his artistic inspiration, which was reflected in his works that gradually became more complex and sophisticated. For the last decades of his life, he split his time between creating art and taking extended journeys to sacred Huichol sites.

He died on the morning of July 1, 2009, at a hospital in Tepic.

== Exhibitions ==
In 1972, some of his works were exhibited in several states of Mexico, and later in the United States at the San José Museum of Art in California (1976), at the Tropenmuseum in Amsterdam, Netherlands, and four other European cities (1984–1985), reaching its peak at the Museum of Modern Art in Mexico (1986). Additionally, his works were exhibited at the Convent of Pollença in Mallorca in 1991. In March 2008, he participated in the Fourth Mítica Comala Festival, Echoes of the Coast, in Comala, Colima, presenting his exhibition "Steps of the Silent Walker." In July 2011, the tribute exhibition "José Benítez Sánchez, mara' akame: El Caminante Silencioso" was held at the Museo Universitario de Artes Populares María Teresa Pomar.

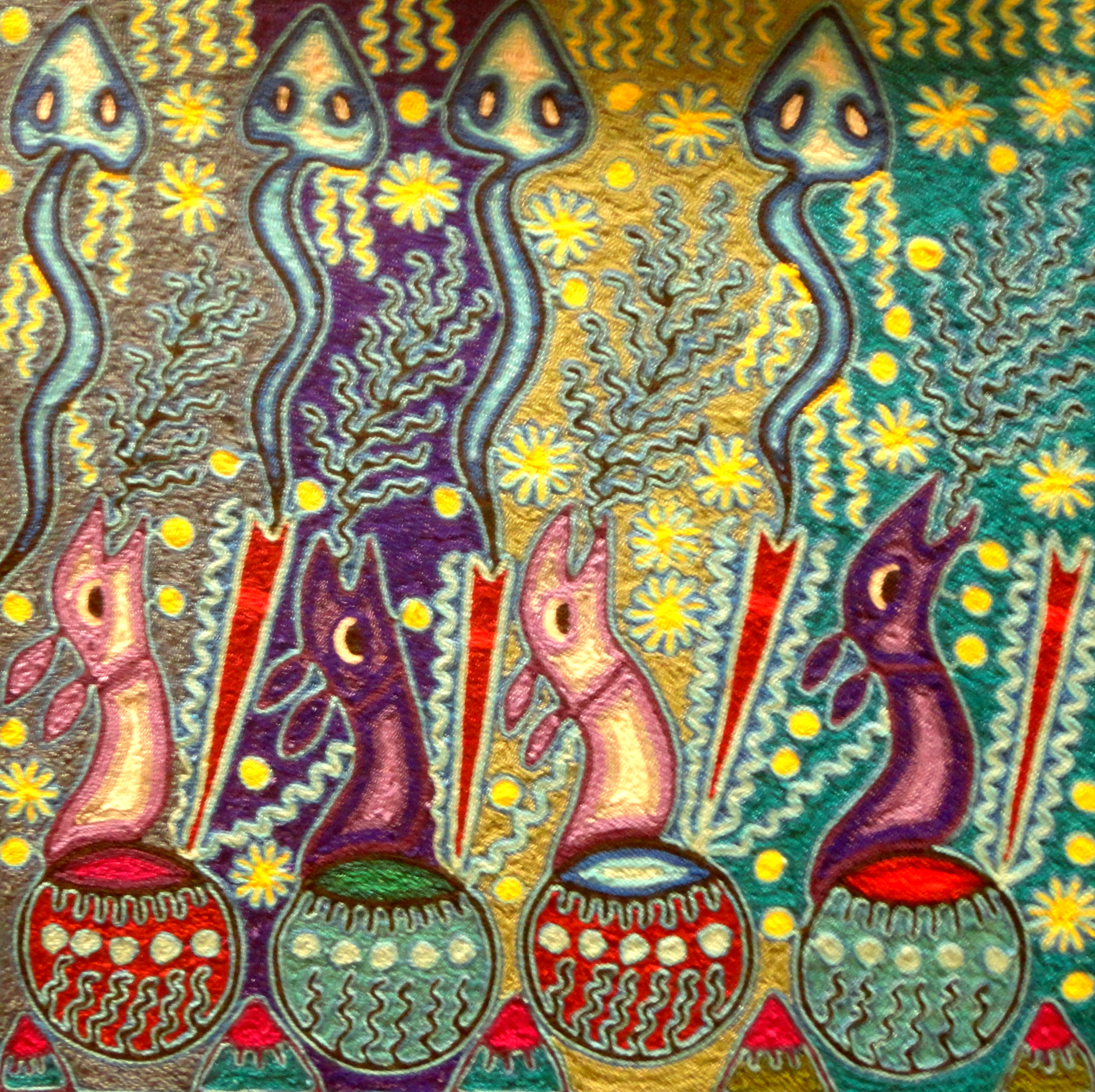
Ancient deities being born from ceremonial gourds.

Since 1994, the University of Pennsylvania Museum of Archaeology and Anthropology has a permanent collection of Huichol yarn paintings, including works by Benítez.

Since 2001 the Juárez light rail station in Guadalajara features a mural created by artist Benítez, called La semilla del mundo (English: The seed of the world). It represents the origin of the three worlds according to the Wixárika worldview.

When Benítez died, his unfinished work La creación del mundo - Kiekari Muyu Tawewitsie (English: The creation of the world) was exhibited at the Centro Universitario del Norte. Only 9 of the 21 projected panels were finished. In 2023, his son Fidencio Benítez Rivera concluded the remaining panels. It has been exhibited in campuses of the University of Guadalajara, such as CUCEA.

His art is part of the permanent collection of the National Museum of Anthropology in Mexico City.

== Awards ==
- 2003: Silver Eagle Medal at the October Cultural Festival in Guadalajara.
- 2003: National Prize for Arts in the 'Popular Arts and Traditions' category.

== See also ==
- Huichol art
- Santos de la Torre
