= Nin =

Nin or NIN may refer to:

- National identification number, a system used by governments around the world to keep track of their citizens
- National Information Network
- National Institute of Nutrition, Hyderabad, an institution in Hyderabad, India
- Netherlands Institute for Neuroscience, a neuroscience research institute in Amsterdam, the Netherlands
- Nine Inch Nails, an American industrial rock band founded by Trent Reznor
- NIN (magazine), a Serbian political magazine
- NIN (cuneiform), the Sumerian sign for lady
- NIN (gene), a human gene
- Nin (surname), a surname
- Nion or Nin, a letter in the Ogham alphabet
- Akira Nishitani (a.k.a. Nin or Nin-Nin), co-creator of the game Street Fighter II
- Anaïs Nin, French-Cuban author
- Nin Pandit, British civil servant
- Nin, Croatia, a town in the Zadar County in Croatia
  - Bishop Gregory of Nin, an important figure in the 10th century ecclesiastical politics of Dalmatia.

== See also ==
- Nin (surname)
- National Insurance number
