= Nin (surname) =

Nin is a surname of Catalan origin. Notable people with the surname include:

- Alberto Nin Frías (1878-1937), Uruguayan writer
- Anaïs Nin (1903–1977), French-born author and diarist
- Andrés Nin (1892-1937), Spanish revolutionary
- Joaquin Nin (1879-1949), Cuban pianist and composer
- Joaquin Nin-Culmell (1908–2004), Cuban-Spanish composer
- Rodolfo Nin Novoa (born 1948), Uruguayan politician, former Vice President

== See also ==
- Nin (disambiguation)
- Nia (given name)
- Nina (name)
- Niño (name)
- Nino (name)
