= Niño Fidencio =

Mexican folk saint

Curandero, Folk Healer
- Born: José de Jesús Fidencio Constantino Síntora; October 17, 1898
- Died: October 19, 1938 (aged 40); Espinazo, Nuevo León, Mexico
- Venerated in: Fidencista Christian Church, Folk Catholicism
- Major shrine: Espinazo, Nuevo León, Mexico
- Feast: 19 March
- Patronage: Healings, cures, protection from diseases

José de Jesús Fidencio Constantino Síntora (October 17, 1898 – October 19, 1938), better known as el Niño Fidencio, was a Mexican curandero. Today he is revered by the Fidencista Christian Church. The Catholic Church does not recognize his official status as a saint, but his following has extended through the northern part of Mexico and the southwest of the United States. This situation allows El Niño Fidencio to be recognized as a folk saint.

While in elementary school, he met Father Segura, as well as Enrique López de la Fuente, who was the janitor as well as his friend, and later, his protector. They both worked to help the priest with religious services, and it was at this time that Fidencio learned to work with herbs and how to cure.

== Adolescence and adult life ==
In 1912, Enrique and Fidencio left for the city of Morelia, Michoacán, where Fidencio worked as a kitchen servant until his friend Enrique decided to join the Mexican Revolution, causing them to be separated for nine years. Fidencio then moved to Loma Sola, Coahuila, where he lived with his sister Antonia.

At the age of fifteen, Fidencio attended school in Mina, Nuevo León. According to Raúl Cadena, Fidencio did not develop sexually, could not grow facial hair, had a high-pitched voice, and never engaged in sexual activity.

In 1921, Enrique returned from the revolutionary struggle and went to work for Antonio L. Rodríguez at the San Rafael mine in Espinazo (Nuevo León), a village about 120 miles from the Rio Grande. There he had several children, and, needing help in caring for them, went to his childhood friend. Fidencio came to town that year, and remained there for the rest of his life. It was at this point that he began to perform healings.

On February 8, 1928, President Plutarco Elías Calles visited Espinazo and attended a healing session with Niño Fidencio. Although the president's ailment was unknown to the public at the time, Enrique records that he was suffering from nodular leprosy.

== Cures ==
In 1925, as Fidencio was working as a laborer, he began attending to those who were sick and/or injured, such as women in labor. As he progressed in his work, his reputation as a divine healer began to spread. In 1927, Fidencio cured the owner of the Espinazo estate of a disease that multiple licensed doctors could not diagnose and treat.

Fidencio was famous for operations without anesthesia without causing pain to patients, and for relating cures to specific places in the village, such as a Peruvian pepper tree where he would toss fruit or other objects at the people gathered there, with those being hit being cured, or a muddy pool in which he would submerge his followers. Subsequent tests revealed that the pool had a large sulfur content which may have contributed to the healing effects. Citizens of both Mexico and the United States believed in the powers of Fidencio, that they would travel hundreds of miles on foot, by train, or by car to his ranch in Nuevo León, Mexico.

According to devotees, Fidencio continues to work miracles through people called cajitas or materias who channel his power.

== Influence ==
By 1927, Fidencio's popularity grew rapidly. One newspaper reported that more than 4,000 people from different class levels were in attendance at the Espinazo hacienda to experience Fidencio's healing powers.

During his life, a multitude of imitators and impostors appeared, the death of one of whom was mistaken for Fidencio's own. The falsified death was announced by the press, and his funeral prompted a massive outpouring of emotion. His actual death came just over a year later. Decades later, he still dominates the economy of the town of Espinazo, and his fame is the key to the town's tourist activity, as well as to the sale of products related in some fashion to his cures and his person.

== Backlash ==
While many people believed Fidencio was a great healer, the state of Nuevo León created a case against him for "illegally practicing medicine." Various medical professionals and health authorities described Fidencio as a "medical fraud". They believed that he was in it for fame and fortune, not to provide cures.

== Media ==
"Niño Santo" series can be watched on NBC Universo.

Quentin Tarantino references Niño Fidencio by name in the movie Death Proof.

A film about him was directed by Nicolás Echevarría.
