= Nilo Syrtis =

Region on Mars

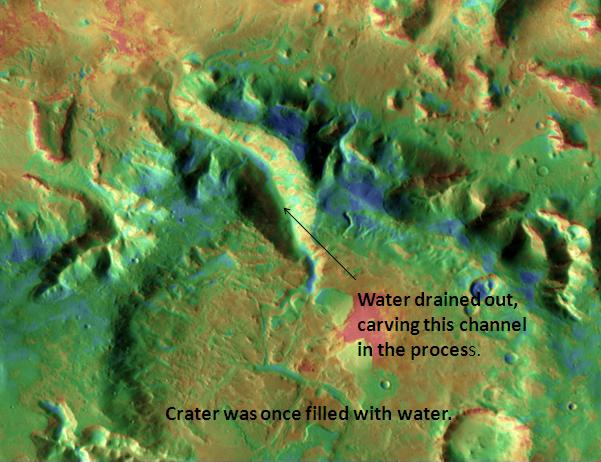
- Channel in Nilosyrtis that was formed when a lake in a 45-mile-wide crater drained, as seen by THEMIS.
- Coordinates: 23°N 76°E

Nilo Syrtis (or Nilosyrtis) is a region just north of Syrtis Major Planum on Mars, at approximately 23°N, 76°E and an elevation of −0.5 km. It marks a region of transition (a "crustal dichotomy") between southern highland and northern lowland terrain, and consists of isolated peaks and mesas. On average, the drop in elevation between the two terrains is 5,500 meters (18,000 feet).

== Mars Science Laboratory ==
Nilosyrtis is one of the sites proposed as a landing site for the Mars Science Laboratory. However, it did not make the final cut. It was in the top 7, but not in the top 4. The aim of the Mars Science Laboratory is to search for signs of ancient life. It is hoped that a later mission could then return samples from sites identified as probably containing remains of life. To safely bring the craft down, a 12-mile-wide, smooth, flat circle is needed. Geologists hope to examine places where water once ponded. They would like to examine sediment layers.

== Gallery ==
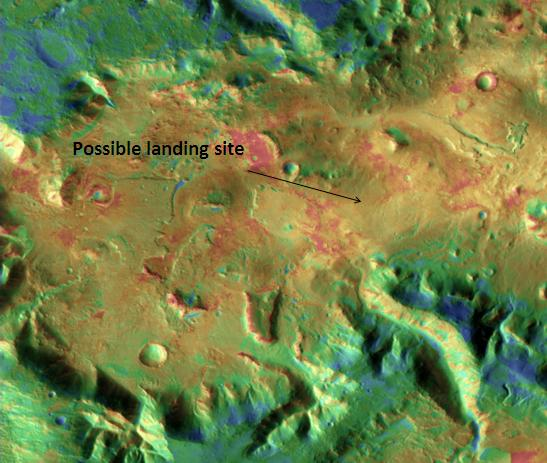
Landing Site in Nilosyrtis, as seen by THEMIS. Site is flat and contains water-altered clay minerals.

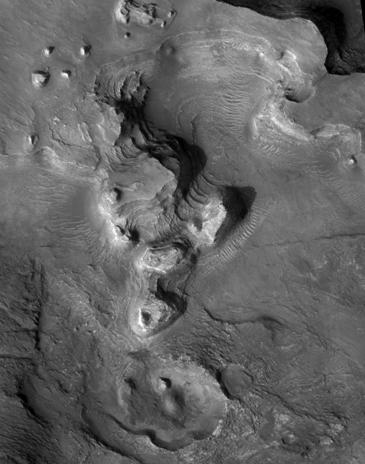
Nilosyrtis, as seen by HiRISE.

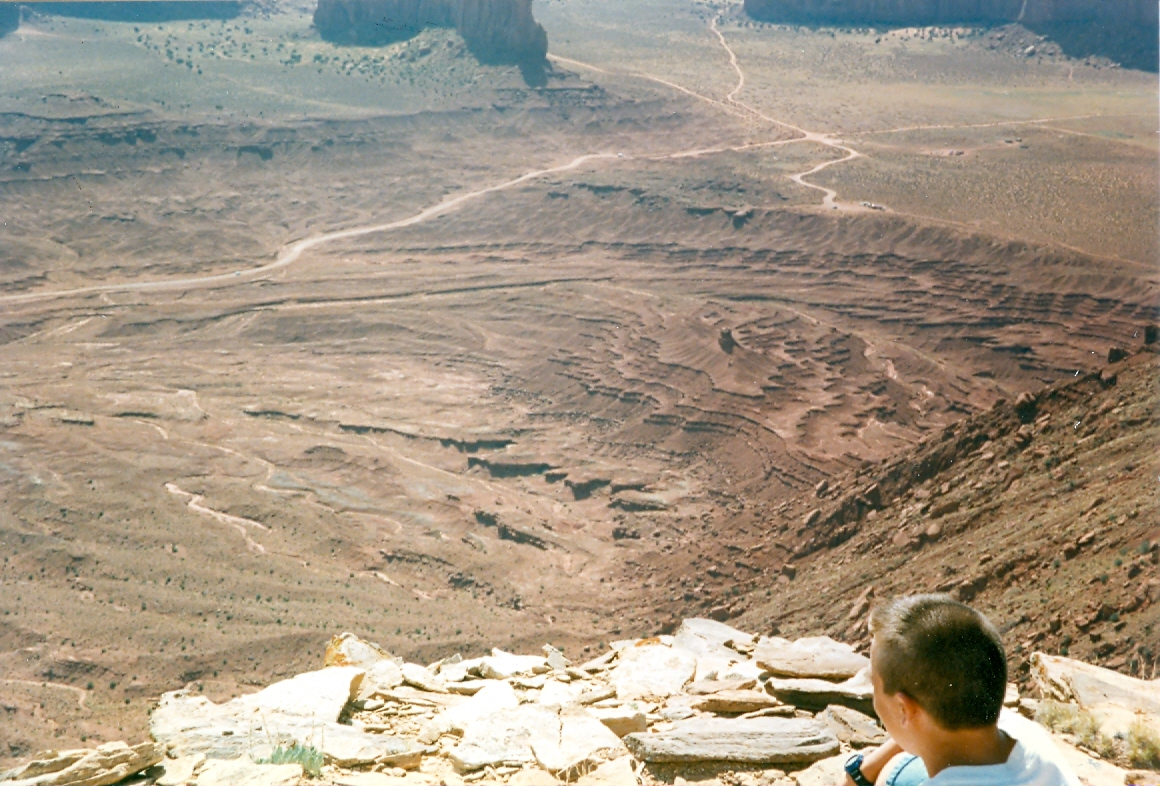
Layers in Monument Valley. These are accepted as being formed, at least in part, by water deposition. Since Mars contains similar layers, water remains as a major cause of layering on Mars.
