= David Niño de Guzmán =

Bolivian journalist and editor (1969–2011)

- Born: 30 December 1969; Uncía, Potosí, Bolivia
- Disappeared: 19 April 2011; La Paz, Bolivia
- Status: Found dead
- Died: 19 April 2011 (aged 41); La Paz, Bolivia
- Cause of death: explosion
- Body discovered: Renè Zavaleta Avenue near Miraflores on 21 April 2011
- Education: University of Saint Francis Xavier
- Occupations: Journalist and editor
- Years active: 16
- Employer: Fides News Agency (ANF)
- Title: Chief Editor
- Spouse: Sandra Flores (separated)
- Partner: Sheyla C. (former)
- Children: Two sons

David Niño de Guzmán (30 December 1969 – 19 April 2011), a Bolivian journalist and editor, was chief editor for Fides News Agency (ANF) when he disappeared and was found dead two days later in the periphery of La Paz, Bolivia. While the cause of his death was an explosive device, the agency behind his death is suspicious and still disputed.

== Personal ==
David Niño de Guzmán was born on 30 December 1969 in Uncía, Potosí, Bolivia. He studied communications at the University of San Francisco Xavier de Chuquisaca. He was a resident of La Paz, Bolivia. He married Sandra Flores. The couple had two children and were separated at the time of his death.

== Career ==
David Niño de Guzmán had spent 16 years in journalism. He had previously worked as a journalist for the newspapers La Razón, El Diario, Última Hora, and the widely circulated Presencia. He also once worked in television for Cadena A-Canal 36. He assumed the position of chief editor in March 2010 after working for Fides News Agency (ANF) for 4 years.

== Death ==
Mentioned locations within Bolivia relative to the capital city Sucre.

Witnesses say David Niño de Guzmán either had an argument with his ex-girlfriend, with whom he had a child, or that he received a threatening phone call. In either case, he left work after a phone call.

Afterward, Guzmán was not seen for two days until authorities were notified of a discovery of a body in a ravine near the Orkojahuira River by Avenida Zavaleta (René Zavaleta Avenue) and near Miraflores neighborhood. His body was identified at the morgue by his family. An autopsy showed Guzmán died on 19 April 2011 due to stomach damage caused by the detonation of a bomb.

== Investigation ==
Press freedom NGOs and the five Bolivian press associations were quick to call for an investigation into his death. The Office of the Special Rapporteur urged an investigation to determine whether his murder may have had a possible connection to his work as a journalist. President Evo Morales ordered the investigation of Guzmán's death, as many believed it to be a murder.

While authorities ruled his death a suicide, his colleagues, family, and friends, believe it was a homicide.

A full investigation led to the Public Prosecutor's Office ruled Guzmán's death a suicide. Their findings showed Guzmán had held the bomb to his chest before detonation and his hands had no injuries from resistance. There was also no evidence of his arms or hands being tied. Blasting caps and dynamite were found in his apartment. Psychological assessments had shown Guzmán to be emotionally disturbed leading up to the incident. He also was found to have suffered from obsessive–compulsive disorder (OCD).

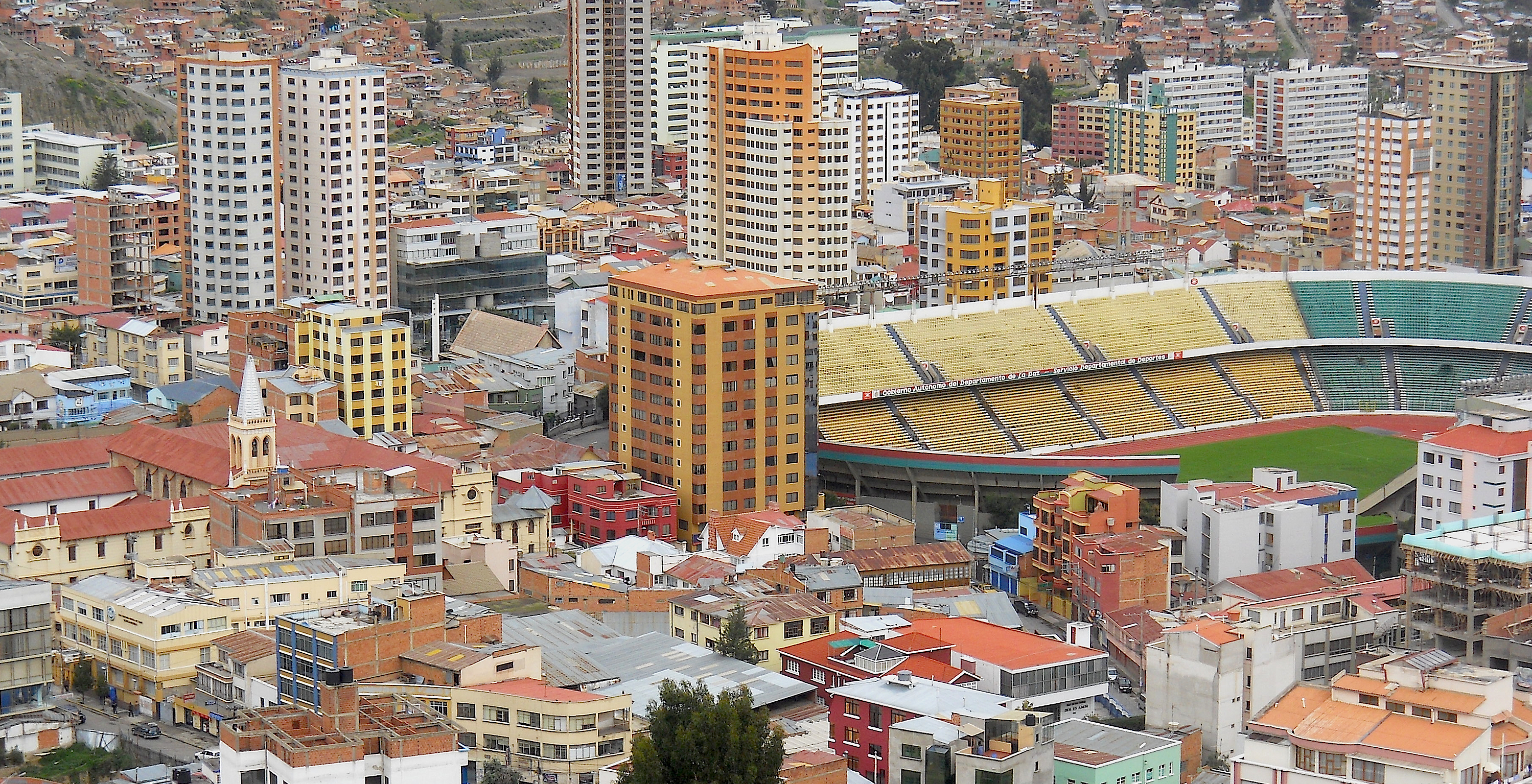
The Miraflores neighborhood of La Paz, Bolivia.

His wife, however, holds the opinion that he was murdered. The couple had been separated for five years. She argues that Guzmán didn't like explosive weapons. She also noted that he had become anxious leading up to the day of his death and there was no suicide note. She believes he received threats over the phone. She suggested that information he published had something to do with his death. His girlfriend, with whom he had a child, was also of the opinion that he was murdered. She said he was indecisive and would have been unable to carry through such an act. Her lawyer also said that the distance he would have had to travel to the scene of his death was too far. His colleagues said he was not robbed. They believed he had been dragged some distance. His body showed signs of torture and his shirt torn. His stomach had damage, as well as his left arm. The case remained closed for over one year with no new evidence. His colleagues also believe his case was closed under pressure by someone in justice.

== Context ==
In 2011, David Niño de Guzmán's death was the only instance of a fatality associated with journalism in Bolivia. Long after his case was closed, journalists continued to raise his name as a victim of violence against journalists in Bolivia. While the Committee to Protect Journalists still have not confirmed Guzmán as a work-related death, it has confirmed two other Bolivian journalists, Carlos Quispe Quispe of Radio Municipal killed 29 March 2008 in Pucarani and Juan Carlos Encinas, a freelance journalist, killed 29 July 2001 in Catavi.

== Impact ==
A march was held in honour of David Niño de Guzmán on 27 April 2011. Demonstrators urged authorities to hold a full investigation into his death and for life insurance for media workers. Additionally, the government was looking into low salaries, the long working days of journalists, arbitrary layoffs, medical insurance, and mistreatment of media workers by their employers.

== Reactions ==
Reporters Without Borders insisted those responsible be punished.

Irina Bokova, director-general of UNESCO, said, "I urge the Bolivian authorities to thoroughly investigate the brutal death of David Niño de Guzmán. Bringing to light the circumstances, and punishing those responsible, sends an important signal that freedom of expression is an inviolable right, and that the existence of a diverse and independent media is vital for informed public debate."

Media workers urged the government for a full investigation, life insurance, and other improvements to their working conditions. While authorities ruled David Niño de Guzmán's death a suicide, however, many still believe it was a homicide, José Luis Columba, head of the Asociación Nacional de la Prensa (National Press Association) in Bolivia, pointed to the violent nature of his death as an indicator of murder.

== See also ==
- Media of Bolivia
