= Niño de Murcia =

French singer and guitarist

Niño de Murcia (Zeneta, Murcia) is a French flamenco singer and guitarist, born in Spain and moved to France at age of 20 years, known for his Spanish / Latin songs. He was signed to Disques Festival label that released most of his recordings. He sang mainly in Spanish, but also released a number of songs in French and a number of other languages and was famous internationally, notably in Europe, Africa and the Middle East. His Spanish language songs "El Emigrante" and "Esperanza" (originally by Charles Aznavour) remain iconic songs of the early 1960s in France, as well as his famous covers of many classics like "Granada", "Guantanamera", "Malagueña" etc.

== Awards ==
Niño de Murcia won the "Grand Prix du Disque" award by the Académie du Disque Français.

== Discography ==
=== Albums ===
Title and details	Notes
La Tani: Type: Album; Released: 1958	Track list: 1. La Tani; 2. Media Granaina; 3. La Romaria Lorena; 4. Pot-pourri espagnol 5. Alegrias; 6. Cale; 7. Muerte de Manolete; 8. Rosas
Malagueña / Granada: Type: Album; Released: 1958	Track list: 1. La Tani; 2. Media Granaina; 3. La Romaria Lorena; 4. Al Amor; 5. Alegria de Jerez; 6. Malagueña; 7. Muerte de Manolete; 8. El Soldado De Levita; 9. Cale; 10. Alegrias; 11. Rosas; 12. Granada
Mira Mira: Type: Album; Released: 1958	Track list (tracks 1–5 with Hector Perez & Morenita Sanz / tracks 6–10 with Jean Bouchety and his Orchestra): 1. Mira Mira; 2. Celitos; 3. El Berebito; 4. Puentecito; 5. Ay del Ay; 6. Maria Morena; 7. Historia de un amor 8. Si Vas a Catalayud; 9. Bolera Gitano; 10. Luna Serrana
Esperanza: Type: Album; Released: 1962	Track list: 1. Esperanza; 2. Madrid Madrid; 3. Granada; 4. Cinquième danse des Granados; 5. Mi Jaca; 6. Puerta del Sol; 7. Malagueña; 8. Mirame Morenita; 9. El Soldado de Levita; 10. Valencia; 11. Camino Verde; 12. Angelitos Negros

=== Minis ===
Year	Main release	Other tracks
1958	"Fiesta de Navidad"	"Mi Nina", "El Bele Bele", "Faraon"
1959	"Du Moment qu'on s'aime	"Amour d'Espagne","Toute une année", "Vive Paris"
1961	"Esperanza"	"Mi Jaca", "Nostalgia India", "Mirame Morenita"
1961	"Guantanamera"	"Mírame Soledad", "Sahara", "Mar, Cielo y Sierra"
1961	"Puerta del Sol"	"La Cravana y El Viento", "5ème Danse De Granados", "Noce a Rio"
1962	"Adiós Mi Vida"	"Sinceridad", "Clavelitos", "El Festival"
1962	"Mi Flamenco Twist"	"Madrid Madrid", "Por Tu Amor", "Penalti"
1962	"El Cordobes"	"Cari, Cari, Caridad", "Justicia", "Muchas Gracias Señorita"
1963	"Cuarenta Noches"	"Cancion Torera", "Carino Mio", Llorar Llorar (Y'Aura Y'Aura)"
1965	"La luna y el toro"	"Corazon de madera", "Soy pecador", "En Murcia"

=== Compilations ===
- 2007: Guitares, mes amies
- 2015: Niño de Murcia: 50 succès essentiels 1957-1962 (2 CDs)

Tracklist: CD 1: 1. "El emigrante" (3:27) 2. "Guitares, mes amies" (2:58) 3. "Jusqu'au bout du monde" (1:59) 4. "Antonio Vargas Heredia" (from Noche de Andalucía) (5:04) 5. "La tani" (from Vendetta en Camargue (2:59) 6. "El berebito" (2:38) 7. "Ay del ay (Bulerias)" (2:51) 8. "Mira mira" (3:13) 9. "Puentecito" (3:00) 10. "Celitos" (2:00) 11. "María Morena" (1:49) 12. "Historia de un amor" (2:38) 13. "Bolero gitano" (3:26) 14. "Luna serrana" (2:51) 15. "Du moment qu'on s'aime" (3:01) 16. "Amour d'Espagne" (2:44) 17. "Toute une année" (3:07) 18. "Vive Paris" (3:20) 19. "Les gitans" (3:55) 20. "Tanto tienes tanto vales" (2:46) 21. "Le gitan et la fille" (3:35) 22. "Camino verde" (3:47) 23. "Malagueña" (4:03) 24. "El soldado de levita" (2:53) 25. "Que nadie sepa mi sufrir" (2:41)
CD 2: 1. "Granada" (3:55) 2. "Vénus" (2:30) 3. "Melodía perdida" (2:39) 4. "Eva la Gitana" (from La Femme et le Pantin) (3:05) 5. "Murcia de mi sueños" (3:38) 6. "Valencia" (2:22) 7. "Angelitos negros" (2:27) 8. "Si vas a Calatayud" (3:12) 9. "Luna de miel" (3:03) 10. "Puerta del sol" (3:36) 11. "La caravana y el viento" (2:59) 12. Danse espagnole N°5 "Andalucia" (5:15) 13. "Noche a Río" (2:10) 14. "Esperanza" (2:57) 15. "Nostalgia India" (3:39) 16. "Mi jaca" (3:01) 17. "Mírame Morenita" (2:12) 18. "Mi flamenco twist" (2:07) 19. "Madrid" (2:32) 20. "Por tu amor" (2:43) 21. "Penalti" (2:34) 22. "Sinceridad" (2:45) 23. "Clavelitos" (2:42) 24. "El festival" (2:20) 25. "Adiós mi vida" (3:00)
