= Orlando García (footballer) =

Mexican footballer (born 1995)

Personal information
- Full name: Orlando García Niño
- Date of birth: 12 April 1995 (age 31)
- Place of birth: Ciudad Victoria, Tamaulipas, Mexico
- Height: 1.78 m (5 ft 10 in)
- Position: Defender

Youth career
- 2012–2013: UAT

Senior career*
Years	Team	Apps	(Gls)
2013–2017	UAT	31	(0)
2017–2018	Atlético Reynosa	28	(0)
2018–2019	Nayarit	28	(0)
2019–2020	Matamoros	18	(2)
2021	Saltillo	6	(0)
- * Club domestic league appearances and goals as of March 17, 2021

Orlando García Niño (born 12 April 1995) is a Mexican footballer who plays as a defender for Saltillo. Throughout his career life, he has been associated with different clubs in the Mexican football league.
