= Nicolás Echevarría =

Mexican film director

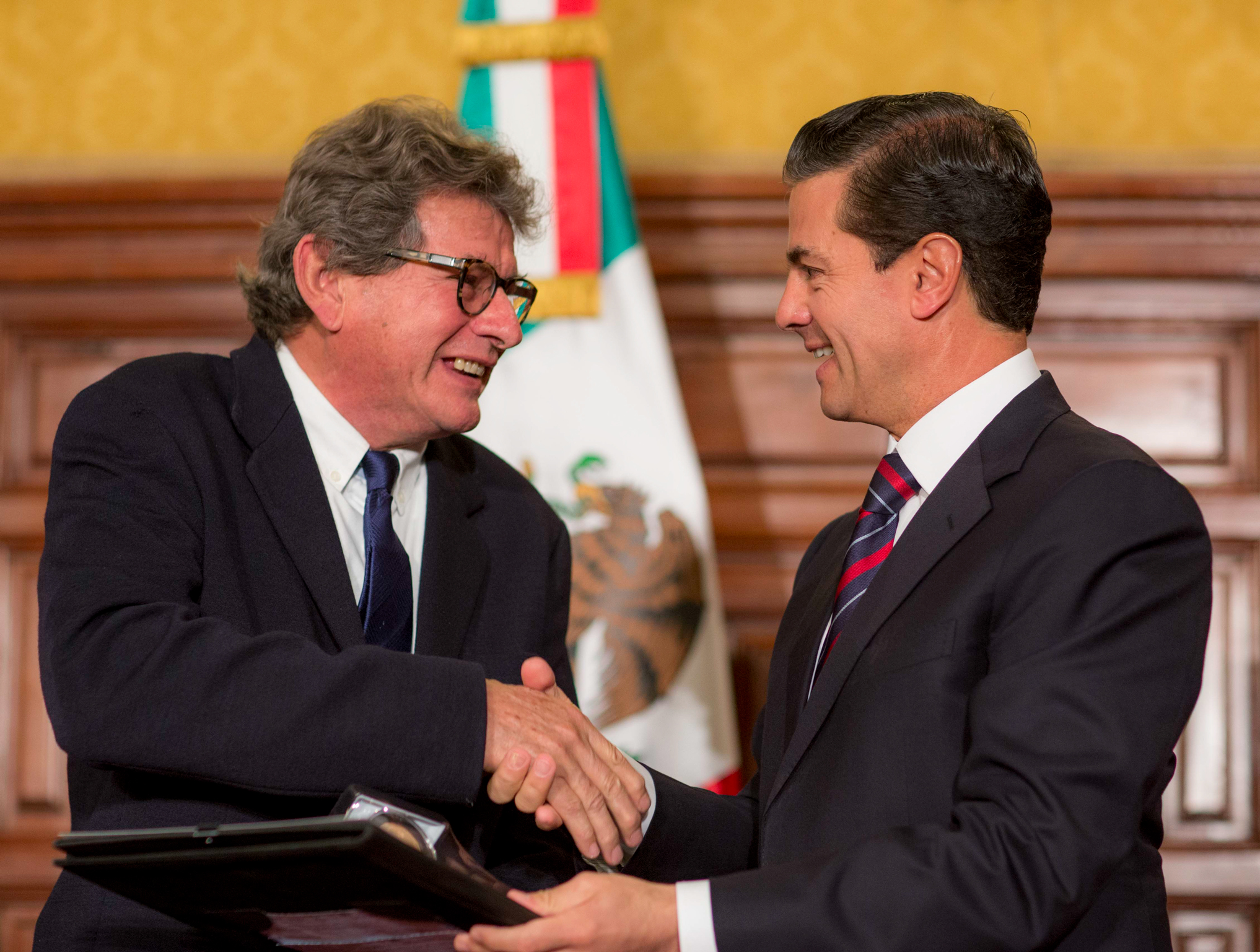
- Nicolás Echevarría (left) receiving Arts and Literature National Prize 2017.
- Born: 8 August 1947 (age 78); Nayarit, Mexico
- Occupations: Film director Cinematographer
- Years active: 1973-present

Nicolás Echevarría (born 8 August 1947) is a Mexican film director and cinematographer. He has directed over 20 films since 1973. His 1991 film Cabeza de Vaca was entered into the 41st Berlin International Film Festival.

Echevarría draws on his Mexican heritage in early films. He discusses his observations of Mexican spirituality in an interview with Betsy Sussler: “I have worked with about ten groups of Indians in Mexico, and the things that I have come across most often—related to all of them is this: there are two worlds, one belongs to everyday life—to man, we get up, we take a shower, we think about what we eat for breakfast, what we’ll do for the day . . . Now there is another world, it could be called the Sacred Space.” He lived with the Huichol people for two years and made three films with them. Echevarría features a Mexican Shaman woman in his 1978 documentary María Sabina, mujer espíritu.

== Selected filmography ==
- María Sabina: mujer espíritu (1978)
- Poetas campesinos (1980)
- Niño Fidencio, el taumaturgo de Espinazo (1981)
- Cabeza de Vaca (1991)
- Vivir mata (2001)
- Eco de la montaña (2014)
