= Girl (disambiguation) =

A girl is a young female human.

Girl or The Girl may also refer to:

== Film ==
- Girl (1965 film), a Yugoslav film directed by Mladomir Puriša Đorđević
- Girl (1994 film), an Australian film directed by Peter Thompson
- Girl (1998 film), an American drama film starring Dominique Swain
- Girl (2018 film), a Belgian drama film
- Girl (2020 film), an American-Canadian thriller film
- Girl (2023 film), a British drama film
- The Girl (1969 film) (Diankha-bi), by Senegalese director Mahama Johnson Traoré
- The Girl (1987 film), a British-Swedish film directed by Arne Mattsson
- The Girl (2000 film), a French-American romantic drama film directed by Sande Zeig
- The Girl (2009 film), a Swedish drama film directed by Fredrik Edfeldt
- The Girl (2012 independent film), a film starring Abbie Cornish
- The Girl (2012 TV film), a British film directed by Julian Jarrold
- The Girl (2014 film), a Chinese romantic comedy film

== Literature ==
=== Comics ===
- Girl (comics), a set index article listing items relating to comics

=== Novels ===
- The Girl (novel), a 1978 novel by Meridel Le Sueur
- Girl (Nelson novel), a 1994 novel by Blake Nelson
- Girl (O'Brien novel), a 2019 novel by Edna O'Brien

=== Short stories ===
- The Girl (short story), a 1974 short story by Joyce Carol Oates
- "Girl" (short story), a 1978 story by Jamaica Kincaid

=== Other literature ===
- The Girl: A Life in the Shadow of Roman Polanski, a 2013 memoir by Samantha Geimer

== Music ==
- Girl (band), a 1979–1982 English glam metal band

=== Albums ===
- Girl (Dannii Minogue album), 1997
- Girl (Eskimo Joe album), 2001
- Girl (Magic Dirt album), 2008
- Girl (Maren Morris album), 2019
- Girl (Pharrell Williams album), 2014
- The Girl (album), by Charlotte Perrelli, 2012
- Girl, by Coco & Clair Clair, 2024

=== Songs ===
- "Girl" (Beatles song), 1965
- "Girl" (Beck song), 2005
- "Girl" (Davy Jones song), 1971
- "Girl" (Destiny's Child song), 2005
- "Girl" (Maren Morris song), 2019
- "Girl" (Paul Wall song), 2006
- "Girl" (The Time song), 1982; written by Prince, who later recorded a different song with the same title (see below)
- "Girl" (William Wei song), 2015
- "Girl (Why You Wanna Make Me Blue)", by the Temptations, 1964
- "Girl", by 2hollis from Star, 2025
- "Girl", by Anouk from Hotel New York, 2004
- "Girl", by Baroque, 2016
- "Girl", by Built to Spill from The Normal Years, 1996
- "Girl", by Chaeyoung from Lil Fantasy Vol. 1, 2025
- "Girl", by Chris Spedding from Enemy Within, 1986
- "Girl", by Danzig from Danzig II: Lucifuge, 1990
- "Girl", by Duffy from Endlessly, 2010
- "Girl", by Empire of the Sun from Walking on a Dream, 2008
- "Girl", by Holly Humberstone from Paint My Bedroom Black, 2023
- "Girl", by the Internet from Ego Death, 2015
- "Girl", by Jamie xx from In Colour, 2015
- "Girl", by Pat Benatar from Go, 2003
- "Girl", by Prince, B-side of the single "America", 1985
- "Girl", by Pseudo Echo from Love an Adventure, 1985
- "Girl", by the Records from Shades in Bed, 1979
- "Girl", by Robots in Disguise from Get RID!, 2005
- "Girl", by Stereophonics from Language. Sex. Violence. Other?, 2005
- "Girl", by Suicide from Suicide, 1977
- "Girl", by Tori Amos from Little Earthquakes, 1992
- "Girl", by Whitesnake from Come an' Get It, 1981
- "Girl", by Wifiskeleton from Suburban Daredevil, 2024
- "Girl (You Captivate Me)", by ? and the Mysterians from Action, 1967
- "The Girl", by City and Colour from Bring Me Your Love, 2008

== Other uses ==
- Girl (Chinese constellation)
- The Girl (TV series), a 2016 Colombian drama series
- Girl Skateboard Company, an American skateboard company

== See also ==
- Girlhood (disambiguation)
- Girlfriend (disambiguation)
  - The Girlfriend (disambiguation)
  - Ex-Girlfriend (disambiguation)
- Girls (disambiguation)
  - The Girls (disambiguation)
- Niña (disambiguation)
- "Girlie" (song), by the Peddlers
- The Young Girl, a Malian film
