= Nino =

Nino or Niño may refer to:

== People ==
- Nino (name)
- Niño (name)
- Antonin Scalia, American Supreme Court justice whose nickname was "Nino"
- Kazunari Ninomiya, Japanese artist whose nickname is "Nino"

== Songs ==
- "Niño" (Belanova song), 2005
- "Niño" (Ed Maverick song), 2021
- "Nino", a song from the album Growing Up by the Linda Lindas, 2022

== Film ==
- Nino (1972 film), an Argentine film directed by Federico Curiel
- Nino (2025 film), a French film directed by Pauline Loquès

== Other uses ==
- El Niño, a climate pattern in the tropical Pacific Ocean
- NINO, an abbreviation for National Insurance number in the United Kingdom
- Niño, the smallest conga drum
- Nino (novel), a 1938 children's novel by Valenti Angelo
- Niño (TV series), a 2014 Philippine TV series
- Philips Nino, a PDA-style device
- The Netherlands Institute for the Near East (NINO, Dutch: Nederlands Instituut voor het Nabije Oosten)

== See also ==
- El Niño (disambiguation)
- Santo Niño (disambiguation)
- Ninos (disambiguation)
- Niños (disambiguation)
- Cyclonic Niño
- Niño Jesús
- Cave of Niño
- Niña (disambiguation)
- Nina (disambiguation)
