= Adelfas =

Coordinates: 40°24′01″N 3°40′15″W

- City neighborhood
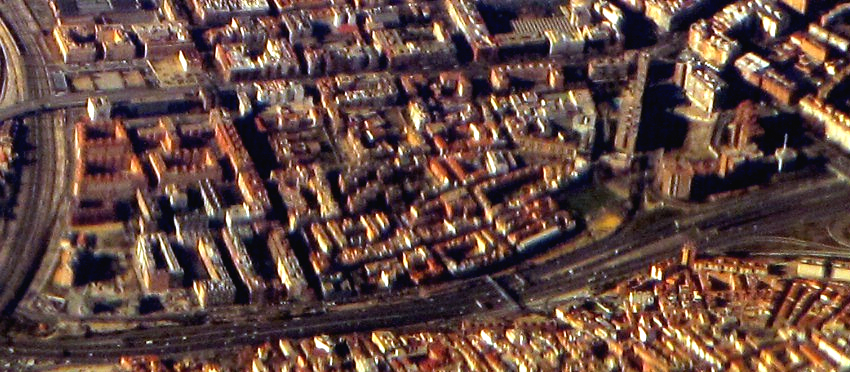
- Interactive map of Adelfas
- Country: Spain
- Region: Community of Madrid
- Municipality: Madrid
- District: Retiro

Area
  - Total: 0.640692 km^{2} (0.247373 sq mi)

Population (2020)
  - Total: 18,886
  - Density: 29,478/km^{2} (76,346/sq mi)

Adelfas is an administrative neighborhood (barrio) in Madrid of the Retiro district. . It is located in the extreme south of the district, so it only delimits with 3 of the 5 neighborhoods of the district: Pacífico to the west, Niño Jesús to the east and Estrella to the northeast. It is a middle class neighborhood, and it is also the neighborhood of the district with the newest architecture. This neighborhood was formerly known as "Las Californias". This name is attributed to the homonymous street that was the backbone of neighborhood.

== Demography ==
It has a population of 12,105 as of January 1, 2006 . The evolution of demographics in the neighborhood has experienced a great increase over the last 20 years. Thus in 1986 the population of the neighborhood was 12,105, in 1991 it was 13,068, in 1996 it was 12,629 and in 2001 it was 14,453. Therefore, if we take the 1986 population as a reference, it has increased by 38%, while the population of the City of Madrid, in the same period, has only grown by 4.8%. In 2020, the population is 18,886.

| Year | Population | Population evolution |
|---|---|---|
| 1986 | 12,105 | 100 |
| 1991 | 13,068 | 108.0 |
| 1996 | 12,629 | 104.3 |
| 1998 | 12,877 | 106.4 |
| 1999 | 12,940 | 106.9 |
| 2000 | 13,414 | 110.8 |
| 2001 | 14,453 | 119.4 |
| 2002 | 15,208 | 125.6 |
| 2003 | 16,149 | 133.4 |
| 2004 | 16,260 | 134.3 |
| 2005 | 16,408 | 135.5 |
| 2006 | 16,705 | 138.0 |
| 2020 | 18,886 | |

The average age of the neighborhood is 41.12 years. Despite being an age not much lower than the average for the city (42.00 years), it is the lowest in a district characterized by its aging since the average age of the district is 43.88 years.

It has a foreign population of 1,747, which represents 10.46% of the population. The most represented community is that of Ecuadorians, with a total of 381 people. The next community is the Colombian one with 136 people, and closely followed by Romanians, with 123 people. Immigration from the European Union contributes 154 people.

== Transport ==
=== Cercanías Madrid ===
No Cercanías station serves this neighborhood. The closest are Méndez Álvaro (C-1, C-5, C-7 and C-10) and Atocha (C-1, C-2, C-3, C-4, C-5, C-7, C-8, C-10) in the Atocha neighborhood of the neighboring Arganzuela district.

=== Metro of Madrid ===
Lines 1 and 6 serve the neighborhood with the stations of Pacífico (both lines), Puente de Vallecas (L1) and Conde de Casal (L6)

=== Buses ===
Within the network of the Municipal Transport Company of Madrid, the following lines provide service to this neighborhood:

| Line | Terminals |
|---|---|
| 8 | Pza. Legazpi - Valdebernardo |
| 10 | Pza. Cibeles - Palomeras |
| 14 | Pza. Conde de Casal - Avda. Pío XII |
| 24 | Atocha - Well of Uncle Raimundo |
| 32 | Pza. Jacinto Benavente - Pavones |
| 37 | Gta. Cuatro Caminos - Vallecas Bridge |
| 54 | Atocha - Bº Vilano |
| 56 | Diego de León - Vallecas Bridge |
| 57 | Atocha - Alto del Arenal |
| 63 | Avda. Felipe II - Bº Santa Eugenia |
| 113 | Méndez Álvaro - Pza. Ciudad Lineal |
| 136 | Pacific - Madrid South |
| 141 | Atocha - Buenos Aires |
| 143 | Pza. Manuel Becerra - Villa de Vallecas |
| 145 | Pza. Conde de Casal - Ensanche de Vallecas |
| 148 | Pza. Callao - Vallecas Bridge |
| 156 | Pza. Manuel Becerra - Pza. Legazpi |
| 310 | Pacific - El Pozo Station |
| AND | Pza. Conde de Casal - Vallecas Polytechnic |
| N9 | Pza. Cibeles - Ensanche de Vallecas |
| N10 | Pza. Cibeles - Palomeras |
| N25 | Pza. Alonso Martínez - Villa de Vallecas |
