= The Girls =

The Girls may be:

== Books ==
- The Girls (Lansens novel), a 2005 novel by Lori Lansens
- The Girls (Cline novel), a 2016 novel by Emma Cline
- The Girls, a 1921 novel by Edna Ferber

== Films ==
- The Girls (1961 film), a Soviet comedy film
- The Girls (1968 film), a Swedish drama film
- The Girl (1987 film), a British-Swedish drama film

== Music ==
- The Girls (musical), a musical based on Calendar Girls
- The Girls (Seattle band), Seattle punk band
- The Girls (1960s band), an American all-female band from the '60s
- "The Girls" (Calvin Harris song), 2007
- "The Girls" (Blackpink song), 2023

== See also ==
- Girl (disambiguation)
- Girls (disambiguation)
