= Neena =

Neena may refer to:

== People ==
- Neena (Hindi actress)
- Neena (Tamil actress)
- Neena Beber, American television producer
- Neena Cheema, Indian TV and film actress
- Neena Gill, Member of the European Parliament for the West Midlands
- Neena Gupta, Indian film and television actress and director-producer
- Neena Haridas, Indian journalist
- Neena Kulkarni, Indian film actress and producer
- Neena Kurup, Indian film and TV actress who works in Malayalam Cinema
- Neena Verma, Indian politician from Madhya Pradesh

== Others ==
- Neena (film), a 2015 Indian Malayalam-language film by Lal Jose
- Neena Thurman a.k.a. Domino, a Marvel Comics character

== See also ==
- Nena (disambiguation)
- Nina (disambiguation)
