= La Niña (disambiguation) =

La Niña (Spanish for 'The Little Girl') is an ocean-atmosphere phenomenon, the complement of El Niño.

La Niña may also refer to:

== Arts and entertainment ==
=== Television ===
- La niña (TV series), a Colombian drama series

=== Music ===
- La Niña (album), a 2021 album by Spanish singer Lola Índigo
- La Niña (singer) (born 1991), Italian singer-songwriter and actress

== See also ==
- Niña (disambiguation)
- El Niño (disambiguation)
