= Ninos (name) =

Ninos is a given name and a surname. Notable people with this name include the following:

== Given name ==
- Ninos (priestess), Athenian priestess
- Ninos Aho (1945–2013), Assyrian poet and activist
- Ninos Gouriye (born 1991), Dutch footballer
- Ninos Khoshaba (born 1970), Assyrian-Australian politician
- Ninos Nikolaidis (born 1998), Greek rower
- Gaboro (born 2000), Assyrian-Swedish rapper, real name Ninos Khouri

== Surname ==
- Tony Ninos (1919-2014), American politician and businessman
- Cindy Ninos (born 1972), Greek skeleton racer

== See also ==
- Ninos (disambiguation)
- Niños Héroes
- Niño (name)
- Nino (name)
- Niños (disambiguation)
- Nios (disambiguation)
- Nines (disambiguation)
- Nanos (disambiguation)
