= Ninos =

Ninos may refer to:

- Ninus, founder of Nineveh
- Tukulti-Ninurta (disambiguation), several ancient kings
- Nineveh, in Greek sources
- Ninos (name), a popular (male) Assyrian forename, and less commonly surname
- Ninos (priestess), a priestess executed in classical Athens

== See also ==
- Nino (disambiguation)
