= Ninho (disambiguation) =

Ninho (born 1996) is a French rapper.

Ninho can also refer to:

- Ninho da Garça, an alternative name for Estádio Municipal Professor Dario Rodrigues Leite
- Ninho do Urubu meaning "The Vulture's Nest", or Centro de Treinamento George Helal, is the training ground and youth team headquarters of Brazilian football club Flamengo
- Ninho (footballer), Juan Luís Bermudes Nascimento (1903–1979), Brazilian footballer

== See also ==
- El Niño (disambiguation)
