= My Girlfriend =

My Girlfriend may refer to:

- "My Girlfriend" (Relient K song)
- "My Girlfriend" (Sean Kingston song)
- "My Girlfriend", a song by Lil' Romeo from Romeoland
- "My Girlfriend", a song by Uncle Kracker from Happy Hour
- My Girlfriend (TV series), a 2019 Chinese television series

== See also ==
- Girlfriend (disambiguation)
