= Girls (disambiguation) =

Girls are young female humans.

Girls or The Girls may also refer to:

== Film and television ==
- Les Girls, a 1957 musical directed by George Cukor
- The Girls (1961 film), a USSR comedy directed by Yuri Chulyukin
- The Girls (1968 film), a Swedish drama directed by Mai Zetterling
- The Girls, a 2007 British short film starring Duncan Duff
- Girls (1980 film), a French-West German-Canadian drama film directed by Just Jaeckin
- Girls (1919 film)
- Girls (2007 film), an Egyptian drama film also known as Balad El Banat
- Girls (2014 film), a Chinese film directed by Wong Chun-chun
- Girls (2016 film), an Indian film
- "Girls" (Serial Experiments Lain episode)
- Girls (TV series), a 2012–2017 HBO series
- "Girls", an episode of Heartstopper

== Literature ==
- Girls (comics)
- The Girls (Lansens novel), 2005 novel by Lori Lansens
- "Girls" (short story), a short story by Mrinal Pande
- The Girls, a 1921 novel by Edna Ferber
- The Girls (Cline novel), 2016 novel by Emma Cline

== Music ==
=== Performers ===
- The Girls (1960s band), an American pop group
- Girls (band), an American indie rock band from San Francisco

=== Albums ===
- Girls (Aespa EP) or the title track (see below), 2022
- Girls (Exo-CBX EP), 2018
- Girls (Eric Stewart album), 1980
- Girls (Yung Baby Tate album), 2021

=== Songs ===
- "Girls" (Aespa song)
- "Girls" (Beastie Boys song)
- "Girls" (Beenie Man song)
- "Girls" (Kid Cudi song)
- "Girls" (The Kid Laroi song)
- "Girls" (Marcus & Martinus song)
- "Girls" (The Prodigy song)
- "Girls" (Rita Ora song)
- "Girls" (Sugababes song)
- "Girls" (The 1975 song)
- "Girls" (Tina Turner song), co-written by David Bowie and later recorded by him
- "Girls", a song by D12 from the album Devil's Night
- "Girls", a song by David Johansen from the album David Johansen
- "Girls", a song by Death in Vegas from the album Scorpio Rising
- "Girls", a song by Diana Ross from the album Ross
- "Girls", a song by Dwight Twilley
- "Girls", a song by Fabolous from the album Real Talk
- "Girls", a song by Fake Shark – Real Zombie! from the album Liar
- "Girls", a song by Girl in Red
- "Girls", a song by Marina and the Diamonds from the album The Family Jewels
- "Girls", a song by Miranda Lambert from the album Platinum
- "Girls", a song by Nature from Nature World: Code M
- "Girls", a song by N-Dubz from the album Love.Live.Life
- "Girls", a song by Nizlopi from the album Half These Songs Are About You
- "Girls", a song by Queen City Kids
- "Girls", a song by Seven
- "Girls", a song by The Dare from the album What's Wrong with New York?
- "Girls", a song by The Sugarhill Gang from the album Livin' in the Fast Lane
- "Girls", a song by twlv from the album K.I.S.S
- "Girls", B-side of the single "Catch Me If You Can" by Girls' Generation
- "Girls...", a song by Marshall Crenshaw from his self-titled debut album
- "Girl$", a song by Stand Atlantic from Was Here
- "Girls (Part 1)", a song by The Moments and The Whatnauts
- "Run the World (Girls)", by Beyoncé Knowles
- "The Girls" (Calvin Harris song)
- "The Girls (Can't Turn Me Down)", a song by Kep1er

== Other uses ==
- Girls, Inc., a non-profit education and advocacy group
- Girls (play), a 1910 play by Clyde Fitch

== See also ==
- Girl (disambiguation)
- Girls Girls Girls (disambiguation)
