= Grace Ives =

American singer-songwriter (born 1995)

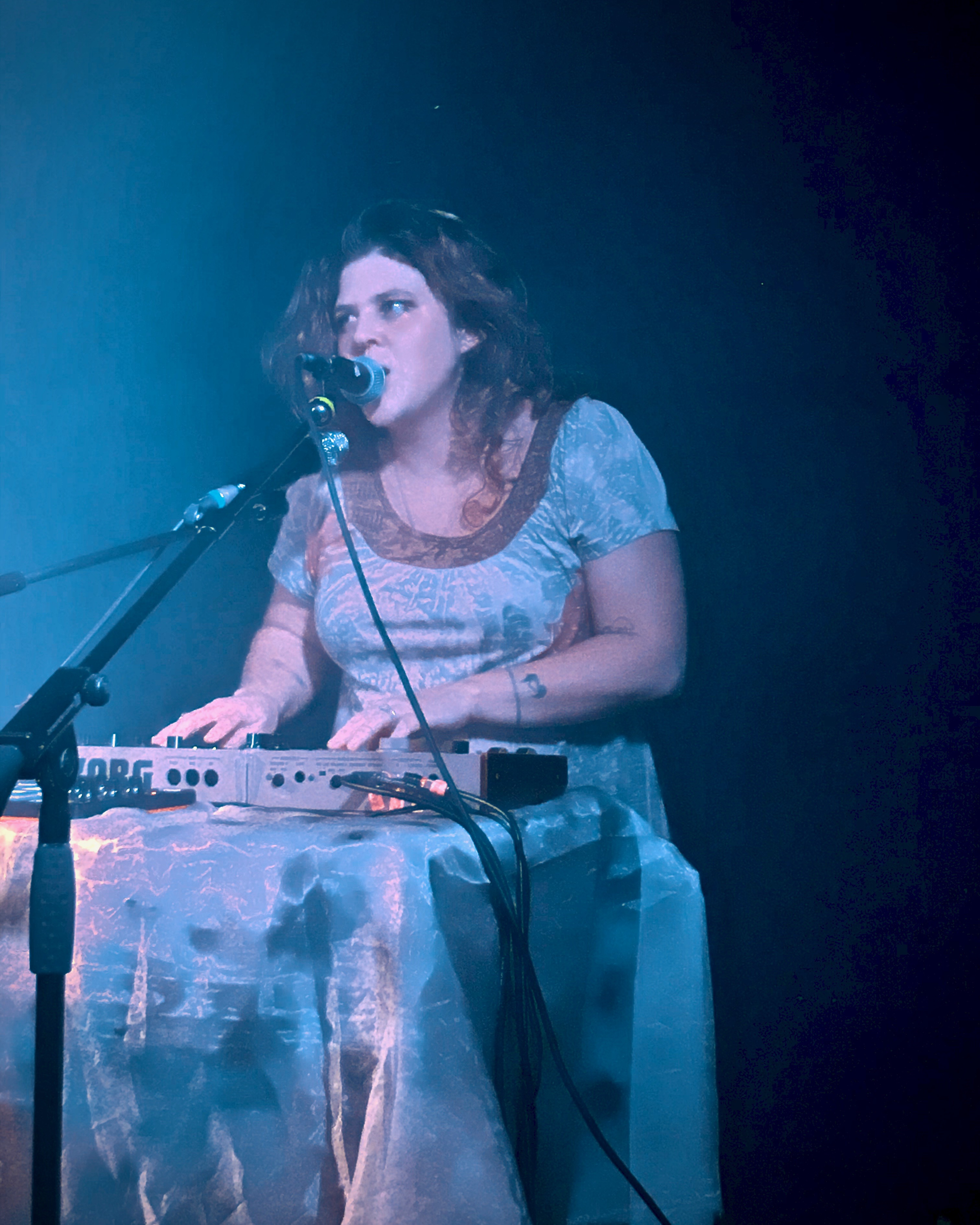
- Ives performing on microKORG at Yes Basement in Manchester, England, 2022

Background information
- Born: c. 1995; New York City, U.S.
- Origin: Brooklyn, New York, U.S.
- Genres: Synth-pop; electronic
- Occupations: Singer; songwriter; musician
- Instruments: Vocals; keyboards
- Years active: 2016–present
- Labels: True Panther Sounds; Harvest; Universal
- Website: graceives4u.com

Grace Ives (born c. 1995) is an American singer-songwriter. Her music has been positively reviewed by publications including Stereogum, which featured her on its Best New Bands of 2019 list, and Pitchfork, which awarded her second studio album Janky Star (2022) its Best New Music rating.

== Early life and education ==
Ives was born circa 1995 in New York City. She was raised in Gowanus, Brooklyn. Her parents worked as a cinematographer and a creative director in the music industry. As a teenager, she participated in the School of Rock program. Ives went to college at Maryland Institute College of Art to study graphic design before transferring to the State University of New York at Purchase. While in college, she began working on music in her dorm room.

== Career ==
Ives released her debut EP, Really Hot, in 2016. She released her debut album, 2nd, on April 22, 2019. She released Janky Star, her second album, on June 10, 2022. In August 2022, she performed her song "Lullaby" on Jimmy Kimmel Live!.

Ives was the support act for Swedish singer Lykke Li on her North American tour supporting new studio album Eyeye (2022).

In October 2025, she released three new songs: "Avalanche," "Dance with Me" and "My Mans". Her album Girlfriend was released on March 20, 2026.

In September 2026, she opened for Robyn in Toronto playing at Scotiabank Arena.

She will be a supporting act on the European leg of Olivia Rodrigo's Unraveled Tour in 2027.

== Personal life ==
Ives lives in the Queens borough of New York City.

== Equipment ==
- Roland MC-505

== Discography ==
- 2nd (2019)
- Janky Star (2022)
- Girlfriend (2026)
