= Locomía =

Spanish pop group

Locomía (also known as Loco Mía) was a Spanish pop group popular in the late 1980s and 1990s. They combined elements of tropical with British music of the new wave and New Romantics. Their first hit was the eponymous song "Locomia".

The original members were Xavier Font, Manuel Arjona, Gard Passchier, and Luis Font. In 1982, the latter two were replaced by Juan Antonio Fuentes (later replaced by Santos Blanco) and Carlos Armas, and later Francesc Picas replaced Xavier Font. At one time, there was also a female member, Lurdes Iribar.

It was disbanded in 1993 due to internal conflict and legal actions.

They often appeared in extravagant outfits that combined Spanish matador pants with frilly jackets done in eighteenth-century style. Fan-twirling was an important part of both their stage performance and their music videos. Both their outfits and their fan-twirling became trademarks of the group and contributed to their popularity.

The band was popular among the gay community, although they were instructed to avoid talking about their sexuality in interviews.

On June 15, 2018, their singer Santos Blanco died at the age of 46, from natural causes.

On July 16, 2018, another ex-member, Frank Romero, died at the age of 46, in Huelva (Spain) from bacterial infection.

On November 18, 2023, another ex-member, Francesc Picas, died at the age of 53.

In May 2024 the film Disco, Ibiza, Locomía was released about the band.

On July 1 2026, Manuel Arjona died at the age of 58.

== Discography ==
- Taiyo (1989)
  - Rumba Samba Mambo, a single from the album
- Loco Vox (1991)
- Party Time (1992)
- Samba Pasion (1999)
- Corazon (2001)
- Loco Mia (2007)
- Imperium (2013)
