= Girlfriend (disambiguation) =

A girlfriend is a female friend or a romantic partner.

Girlfriend(s) or Girl Friend(s) may also refer to:

== Film and television ==
- Girl Friends (1936 film), a Soviet film
- Girlfriends (1978 film), an American comedy-drama starring Melanie Mayron
- Girlfriends (2006 film), a French film
- Girlfriends (2009 film), a South Korean film
- Girlfriends (2021 film), a Spanish film
- Girlfriends (2025 film), a Coming of Age, LGBT Mandarin, Cantonese language film
- Girlfriends (American TV series), an American TV sitcom
- Girl friends – Freundschaft mit Herz, a German drama TV series
- Girlfriends (2012 TV series), a British reality TV series
- Girlfriends (2018 TV series), a British drama TV series
- Girlfriend (2004 film), a Hindi film
- Girlfriend (2010 film), a Canadian-American drama film by Justin Lerner
- Girlfriend (2018 film), a Bengali action film
- Girl Friend (2002 film), an Indian Telugu-language romantic drama film
- "Girlfriend" (My Hero), a TV episode
- "Girlfriends" (Flight of the Conchords), an episode of Flight of the Conchords
- "The Girlfriend" (The Amazing World of Gumball), an episode of The Amazing World of Gumball

== Literature ==
- Girlfriend (magazine), an Australian magazine for teenage girls
- Girlfriends (magazine), an American women's magazine
- Girlfriends (short story collection), an American short story collection by Emily Zhou
- Girl Friend (manga), a Japanese manga by Masaya Hokazono and Court Betten
- Girl Friends (manga), a Japanese yuri manga series by Milk Morinaga

== Music ==
- Girlfriend (group), an Australian pop group
- Girl Friends (group), a South Korean pop duo
- Girlfriend (Grace Ives album)
- Girlfriend (Matthew Sweet album)
- Girlfriend (The Driver Era album)
- Girlfriends (self-titled album)
- The Girlfriends, an American girl group

=== Songs ===
- "Girlfriend" (Alicia Keys song)
- "Girlfriend" (Avril Lavigne song)
- "Girlfriend" (B2K song)
- "Girlfriend" (Big Bang song)
- "Girlfriend" (Billie song)
- "Girlfriend" (Bobby Brown song)
- "Girlfriend" (Bow Wow & Omarion song)
- "Girlfriend" (Charlie Puth song)
- "Girlfriend" (The Darkness song)
- "Girlfriend" (Icona Pop song)
- "Girlfriend" (Jay Park song)
- "Girlfriend" (Kap G song)
- "Girlfriend" (Matthew Sweet song)
- "Girlfriend" (NSYNC song)
- "Girlfriend" (Paul McCartney song)
- "Girlfriend" (Pebbles song)
- "Girlfriends" (Single File song)
- "Girlfriend" (The Pillows song)
- "Girlfriend" (Tyler Medeiros song)
- "Girlfriend" (Wings song), a song covered by Michael Jackson
- "Girlfriend", a song by Ashanti from The Declaration
- "Girlfriend", a song by Victoria Beckham from Victoria Beckham
- "Girlfriend", a song by Rebecca Black
- "Girlfriends", a song by Cheap Trick from Woke Up with a Monster
- "Girlfriend", the English title of the song "Damn, dis-moi" by Christine and the Queens
- "Girlfriend", a song by Day26 from Forever in a Day
- "Girlfriend", a song by Madi Diaz from Weird Faith
- "Girlfriend", a song by Girls' Generation from Tell Me Your Wish (Genie)
- "Girlfriend", a song by I-dle from We Are
- "Girlfriend", a song by Jim Jones from Pray IV Reign
- "Girlfriend", a song by Phoenix from Wolfgang Amadeus Phoenix
- "Girlfriend", a song by Queen Pen from My Melody
- "Girlfriend", a song by Jonathan Richman, originally recorded by the Modern Lovers
- "Girl Friend", a song by Rocket Punch from Red Punch
- "Girlfriend", a song by T-Pain
- "Girlfriend", a song by Wonder Girls from Wonder Party

== Other uses ==
- Girlfriend (fashion), a style of men's clothing
- Girlfriend, a character from the indie rhythm game Friday Night Funkin'

== See also ==
- Doctor Girlfriend, a character from The Venture Bros.
- Girlfriend, Boyfriend, a 2012 Taiwanese film
- Ex-Girlfriend (disambiguation)
- GFriend, a South Korean girl group
