= Kap G =

American rapper

- Born: George Ramirez; July 31, 1994 (age 32); Long Beach, California, U.S.
- Origin: College Park, Georgia, U.S.
- Genres: Hip hop; trap
- Occupations: Rapper; songwriter; actor
- Years active: 2011–present
- Labels: Atlantic; I Am Other
- Website: therealkapg.com

George Ramirez (born July 31, 1994), better known by his stage name Kap G, is an American rapper. He is best known for his 2016 single "Girlfriend", which received platinum certification by the Recording Industry Association of America (RIAA) and entered the Bubbling Under Hot 100 chart.

== Early life ==
George Ramirez was born on July 31, 1994, Long Beach, California but was later raised in Atlanta, Georgia as the youngest of seven children. He graduated from Tri-Cities High School.

== Career ==
Kap G has collaborated with big-name artists, such as Chief Keef, T.I., Wiz Khalifa, Jeezy and Kirko Bangz among others. He released his debut single, titled "Tatted Like Amigos"; a collaboration with Chicago rapper Chief Keef, which garnered him mainstream attention. Since then, Kap G began remixing other artists' songs, which drew the attention of Dungeon Family A&R Representative Kawan Prather, who ultimately discovered Kap G, which landed him a signing deal with Atlantic Records.

On March 6, 2014, Kap G released his mixtape, titled Like a Mexican via DatPiff. He is currently in the studio recording his first extended play (EP), with the assistance of Pharrell Williams. Kap G has been featured in numerous articles for XXL magazine, and was nominated for XXL Freshman in 2015. On March 4, 2016, Kap G released his song "Girlfriend", the second single from highly anticipated mixtape titled El Southside which features special guest appearances from Young Thug, Cash Out and YFN Lucci. "Girlfriend" became his biggest song to date, and was certified Gold by the RIAA in August 2016. On April 14, 2017, he released his debut studio album SupaJefe, on which he collaborates with Chris Brown (on the song "I See You"), Dae Dae and Pharrell Williams. He was on the SupaJefe tour from July 6 to August 26, 2017. On June 12, 2017, XXL revealed Ramirez was included in their annual freshman class, alongside artists XXXTentacion, A Boogie wit da Hoodie, PnB Rock, Ugly God, KYLE, Playboi Carti, Kamaiyah, Aminé, and MadeinTYO.

== Musical style ==
Much of his lyrical content pays homage and represents his Mexican culture and is bilingual, switching between English and Spanish. Kap G has said that his goal in his career is to subvert stereotypes of Mexicans and "to be a part of opening doors for Latinos". In an XXL interview he also stated that his style has been compared to Outkast and South Park Mexican.

== Discography ==
=== Studio albums ===
- SupaJefe (2017)
- No Kap (2018)
- Frida Homies (2025)

=== Mixtapes ===
- Like a Mexican (2014)
- Real Migo Shit 2 (2014)
- Real Migo Shit 3 (2015)
- El Southside (2016)
- Real Migo Shit 4 (2018)
- Real Migo Shit 5 (2025)

=== EPs ===
- Mood (2017)
- Kap On Edge (2022)

=== Singles ===
List of singles, with selected chart positions, showing year released and album name
| Title | Year | Peak chart positions | | Certifications | Album |
| Title | Year | US Bub. | US R&B/HH Bub. | Certifications | Album |
|---|---|---|---|---|---|
| "Tatted Like Amigos" (featuring Chief Keef) | 2012 | — | — | | Non-album singles |
| "Jose Got Dem Tacos" (featuring Jeezy) | 2013 | — | — | | Non-album singles |
| "La Policia" | 2014 | — | — | | Non-album singles |
| "Like El Chapo" (featuring Ca$h Out) | 2015 | — | — | | El Southside |
| "Girlfriend" | 2016 | 10 | 3 | RIAA: Platinum | El Southside |
| "Rings" | 2017 | — | — | | Supa Jefe |
| "I See You" (featuring Chris Brown) | 2017 | — | — | | Supa Jefe |
| "The Bomb" | 2019 | — | — | | Non-album singles |
| "No Heart" (featuring Lil Keed) | 2020 | — | — | | Non-album singles |
| "ICE Baby" | 2020 | — | — | | Non-album singles |
| "Out the Mud" | 2020 | — | — | | Non-album singles |
| "Dangerous" | 2020 | — | — | | Non-album singles |
| "Risk Taker" | 2020 | — | — | | Non-album singles |
| "Different This Time" | 2020 | — | — | | Non-album singles |
| "Quinceañera" | 2021 | — | — | | Non-album singles |
| "Facts" | 2021 | — | — | | Non-album singles |
| "Birthday" | 2021 | — | — | | Non-album singles |
| "BnB" (featuring ChefCookItUp) | 2021 | — | — | | Non-album singles |
| "Uno Dos Tres" | 2021 | — | — | | Non-album singles |
"—" denotes a recording that did not chart or was not released in that territory.

=== Other charted songs ===
List of other charted songs, with selected chart positions, showing year released and album name
| Title | Year | Peak chart positions | Certifications | Album |
| Title | Year | US R&B/HH Bub. | Certifications | Album |
|---|---|---|---|---|
| "Marvelous Day" (featuring Gunna and Lil Uzi Vert) | 2017 | 10 | RIAA: Gold | Mood and Real Migo Shit 4 |

== Filmography ==
Film
| Year | Title | Role | Notes |
|---|---|---|---|
| 2015 | Dope | Fidel | Cameo appearance and is featured on the soundtrack. |

== Tours ==
=== Supporting ===
- Chris Brown – Party Tour (2017)
- Young Dolph – Role Model Tour (2019)
