= Taiyo (Locomía album) =

Studio album by Locomía
- Released: 1989
- Genre: Pop; Europop
- Label: Hispavox

Locomía chronology
Taiyo (1989)	Loco Vox (1990)

Taiyo is the debut studio album by Spanish Europop group Locomía. The formation consisted of four members: Xavier Font, Juan Antonio Fuentes, Carlos Armas and Manuel Arjona. The word that gives the title its name means "sun" in Japanese. Its music incorporates the pop music that was successful at the time in Europe with Latin rhythms.

To promote it, three singles were released: "Locomía", "Taiyo" and "Rumba Mambo", Which were performed in several TV shows, and to each one was recorded a music video in which their androgynous clothing stood out: shoes 1700s style, exaggerated shoulder pads and giant hand fans.

It was commercially successful, and went gold and platinum in ten countries, most of them in Latin America, and sales reached 1 million copies worldwide, making it the best seller of their career.

== Background and production ==
The Locomía group began their career in 1984 as a group of fashion designers, their first members were Xavier Font and his brother Luis, Gard Passchier and Manuel Arjona. Appearing in Ibiza, at the most extreme moment of the 1980s, they drew attention, above all, for their look: they wore shoes style 1700, exaggerated shoulder pads (they reached about 70 centimeters; 28 in) and giant hand fans, and for their androgynous and chic clothing, which defied the conventions of the time. They became famous on the island, livening up the nights at the Ku Club, which was considered the most famous open-air nightclub in the world and was in its heyday.

The popularity grew over time, to the point that singer Freddie Mercury used some of their clothes and shoes in one of his music video. Although the goal was never to become singers, they signed a contract with José Luis Gil, who was also president of the Hispavox label, with the aim of releasing their first phonographic work.

The recordings took place in Madrid, Spain. The label intended that the songs should have a sound that mixes the pop music that was in vogue in Europe with Latin rhythms. The manager and the record company made several demands on the boys, in order to sell their image to as many people as possible, especially young teenagers, since the so-called boy bands generated a lot of financial return. Among the demands was that they had to hide their sexuality, since all four were gay. Another issue is regarding the voices, the group had no vocal talents and the vocals in the first single are by the manager, Gil. This fact remained unknown for years, until a documentary, in three episodes, from the Movistar Plus+ channel, premiered in June 2022.

Eight songs were part of the track list, however, in the version released in Brazil, two of them were versioned into Brazilian Portuguese: "Gorbachov" and "Rumba, Samba, Mambo". The track "Loco Mia" pays tribute to Ibiza in its lyrics; the track "Gorbachev" is a tribute to the then president of the Soviet Union, Mikhail Gorbachev.

== Release and promotion ==
Publicity for the album included appearances on a considerable number of TV shows, in addition to shows, initially only in Spain. The choreographies of the songs were enhanced versions of those performed by the four members at the Ku Club.

Three songs were chosen as singles: "Locomía" (peaking #2 in Spain), "Taiyo" (peaking #10 in Spain), "Rumba Samba Mambo" (peaking #6 in Spain, #27 on the Billboard Hot Latin Songs (US); #10 in Mexico). Four music videos were made for each of them, whose highlight was the quartet's iconic costumes.

== Commercial performance ==
Commercially, it was successful. In Spain, more than 60,000 copies were sold in three months. Promusicae audited the sales and certified it as gold in the same year. According to the official website, total sales were close to one platinum record (100,000).

On November 8, 1990, the Brazilian newspaper O Globo reported that by that date the group had already received a platinum record in Argentina, for more than 60,000 copies sold. Eventually, sales reached 120,000 copies, the equivalent of two platinum records. According to the Brazilian newspaper Correio Braziliense, dated November 26, 1990, in Brazil, it had sold around 100,000 copies. Eventually, a gold record was delivered while the group was on a marathon to promote the album, which made them the most successful Spanish group in the history of the Brazilian music industry.

It obtained a gold disc in six more countries: Chile, Ecuador, Spain, Peru, Uruguay and Venezuela, and a double gold disc in Mexico. It became the biggest hit of their career, with over 1 million copies sold worldwide.

== Track listing ==
No.	Title	Length
1.	"Ti Amo America"	3:34
2.	"Loco Mia"	5:44
3.	"Noche de Embrujo"	5:11
4.	"Terror Vision"	5:35
5.	"Rumba, Samba, Mambo"	3:25
6.	"Gorbachov"	5:12
7.	"Taiyo (Sol)"	5:39
8.	"Finale"	7:18

== Charts ==
Chart (1989–1990)	Peak position
Spain (Promusicae)	35
Uruguay (CUD)	1

== Certifications and sales ==
Region	Certification	Certified units/sales
Argentina (CAPIF)	2× Platinum	120,000^{^}
Brazil (Pro-Música Brasil)	Gold	100,000^{*}
Chile	Platinum	25,000
Colombia	Gold	
Ecuador	Gold	
Mexico (AMPROFON)	2× Gold	250,000
Peru	Gold	
Spain (Promusicae)	Gold	100,000
Uruguay (CUD)	Gold	
Venezuela	Gold	
Summaries
Worldwide	—	1,000,000
^{*} Sales figures based on certification alone.^{^} Shipments figures based on certification alone.
