= Effects of tropical cyclones =

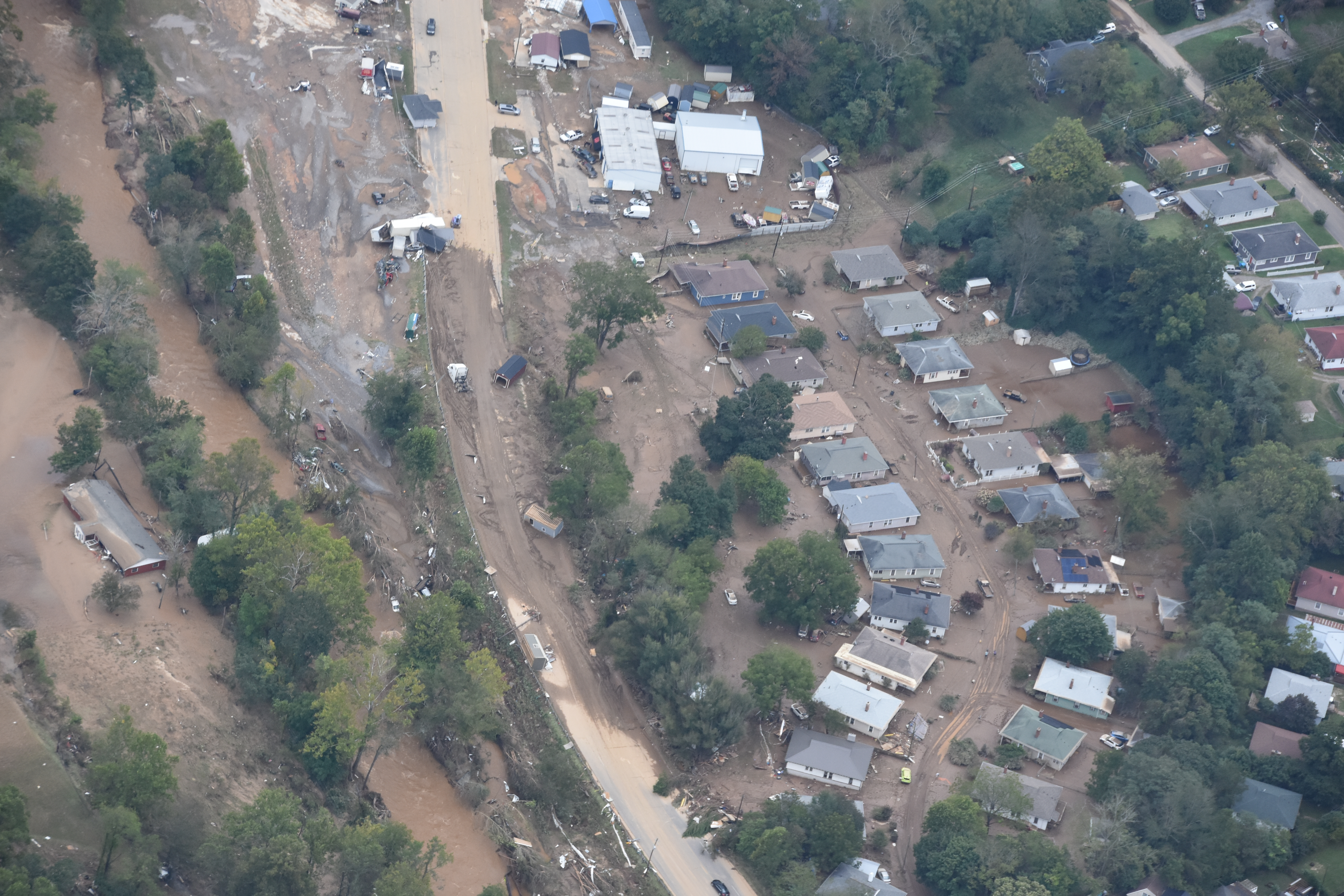
Effects in Buncombe County, North Carolina after Hurricane Helene passed through the area in September 2024.

Percentages of hurricane deaths in the United States from 1970 to 1999.

The effects of tropical cyclones include heavy rain, strong wind, large storm surges near landfall, and tornadoes. The destruction from a tropical cyclone, such as a hurricane or tropical storm, depends mainly on its intensity, its size, and its location. Tropical cyclones remove forest canopy as well as change the landscape near coastal areas, by moving and reshaping sand dunes and causing extensive erosion along the coast. Even well inland, heavy rainfall can lead to landslides in mountainous areas. Their effects can be sensed over time by studying the concentration of the Oxygen-18 isotope within caves.

After the cyclone has occurred, devastation often continues. Fallen trees can block roads and delay rescues, damage houses, block or delay medical supplies, or slow the repairs to electrical lines, telephone towers or water pipes, which could put other lives at risk for days or months. Stagnant water can cause the spread of disease, and transportation or communication infrastructure may have been destroyed, hampering clean-up and rescue efforts. Nearly 2 million people have died globally due to tropical cyclones. Despite their devastating effects, tropical cyclones are also beneficial, by potentially bringing rain to dry areas and moving heat from the tropics poleward. Out at sea, ships take advantage of their known characteristics by navigating through their weaker, western half.

Hazards are often characterized as primary, secondary or tertiary. A primary hazard involves destructive winds, debris and storm surge. Secondary hazards include flooding and fires. Tertiary hazards include spikes in prices of food and other necessities, as well as long term hazards like water-borne diseases.

== At sea ==
The exports and imports are halted in sea ports due to the cyclone. Some people lose their jobs as well. A mature tropical cyclone can release heat at a rate upwards of 6×10^{14} watts. Tropical cyclones on the open sea cause large waves, heavy rain, and high winds, disrupting international shipping and, at times, causing shipwrecks. Generally, after its passage, a tropical cyclone stirs up ocean water, lowering sea surface temperatures behind it. This cool wake can cause the region to be less favorable for a subsequent tropical cyclone. On rare occasions, tropical cyclones may actually do the opposite. 2005's Hurricane Dennis blew warm water behind it, contributing to the unprecedented intensity of Hurricane Emily, which followed it closely. Hurricanes help to maintain the global heat balance by moving warm, moist tropical air to the mid-latitudes and polar regions and also by influencing ocean heat transport. Were it not for the movement of heat poleward (through other means as well as hurricanes), the tropical regions would be unbearably hot.

== North American colonization ==
Shipwrecks are common with the passage of strong tropical cyclones. Such shipwrecks can change the course of history, as well as influence art and literature. A hurricane led to a victory of the Spanish over the French for control of Fort Caroline, and ultimately the Atlantic coast of North America, in 1565. The Sea Venture was wrecked near Bermuda in 1609 which led to the colonization of Bermuda and provided the inspiration for Shakespeare's The Tempest.

== Shipping ==
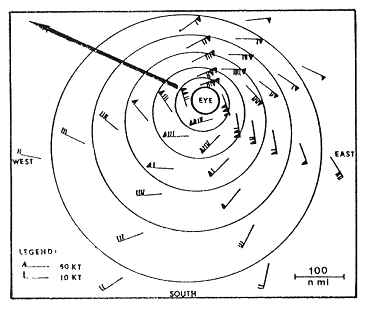
The dangerous semicircle is the upper-right corner, with the arrow marking the direction of motion of a Northern Hemisphere storm. Note that typhoons, etc. are asymmetrical, and semicircle is a convenient misnomer.

Mariners have a way to safely navigate around tropical cyclones. They split tropical cyclones in two, based on their direction of motion, and maneuver to avoid the right segment of the cyclone in the Northern Hemisphere (the left segment in the Southern Hemisphere). Sailors term the right side the dangerous semicircle since the heaviest rain and strongest winds and seas were located in this half of the storm, as the cyclone's translation speed and its rotational wind are additive. The other half of the tropical cyclone is called the navigable semicircle since weather conditions are lessened (subtractive) in this portion of the storm (but are still potentially quite hazardous). The rules of thumb for ship travel when a tropical cyclone is in their vicinity are to avoid them if at all possible and do not cross their forecast path (crossing the T). Those traveling through the dangerous semicircle are advised to keep to the true wind on the starboard bow and make as much headway as possible. Ships moving through the navigable semicircle are advised to keep the true wind on the starboard quarter while making as much headway as possible.

== Upon landfall ==
Wind damage varies exponentially with wind speed, so that small increases in wind strength can dramatically increase damage.
Damages rise by about a factor of four for every category increase in the Saffir–Simpson scale.

The number of $1 billion Atlantic hurricanes almost doubled from the 1980s to the 2010s, and inflation-adjusted costs have increased more than elevenfold. Increases have been attributed to climate change and people moving to coastal areas.

The most significant effects of a tropical cyclone occur when they cross coastlines, making landfall then it destroys ships and lives.

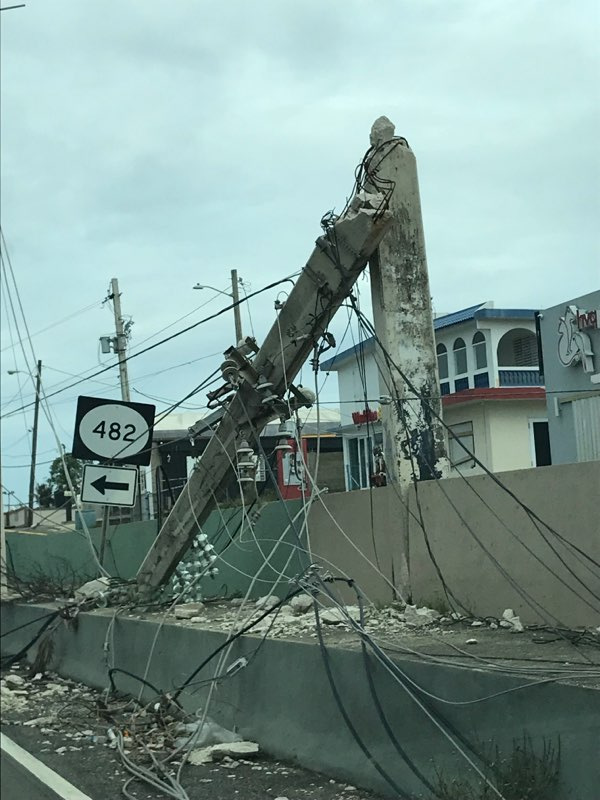
Broken concrete utility pole in Puerto Rico after Hurricane Maria in 2017, which ranks fourth in costliest US tropical cyclones.

=== Strong winds ===
Strong winds can damage or destroy vehicles, buildings, bridges, trees, personal property and other outside objects, turning loose debris into deadly flying projectiles. In the United States, major hurricanes comprise just 21% of all land-falling tropical cyclones, but account for 83% of all damage. Tropical cyclones often knock out power to tens or hundreds of thousands of people, preventing vital communication and hampering rescue efforts. Tropical cyclones often destroy key bridges, overpasses, and roads, complicating efforts to transport food, clean water, and medicine to the areas that need it. Furthermore, the damage caused by tropical cyclones to buildings and dwellings can result in economic damage to a region, and to a diaspora of the population of the region.

=== Storm surge ===
The aftermath of Hurricane Katrina in Gulfport, Mississippi. Katrina was the costliest tropical cyclone in United States history.

The storm surge, or the increase in sea level due to the cyclone, is typically the worst effect from landfalling tropical cyclones, historically resulting in 90% of tropical cyclone deaths. The relatively quick surge in sea level can move miles/kilometers inland, flooding homes and cutting off escape routes. The NOAA report about sea level states that the likeliness of storm surges during a hurricane has increased due to climate change, and by 2050, the chance of moderate flooding occurring will have increased by 10 times. The storm surges and winds of hurricanes may be destructive to human-made structures, but they also stir up the waters of coastal estuaries, which are typically important fish-breeding locales.

=== Heavy rainfall ===
The thunderstorm activity in a tropical cyclone produces intense rainfall, potentially resulting in flooding, mudslides, and landslides. Inland areas are particularly vulnerable to freshwater flooding, due to residents not preparing adequately. Heavy inland rainfall eventually flows into coastal estuaries, damaging marine life in coastal estuaries. The wet environment in the aftermath of a tropical cyclone, combined with the destruction of sanitation facilities and a warm tropical climate, can induce epidemics of disease which claim lives long after the storm passes. Infections of cuts and bruises can be greatly amplified by wading in sewage-polluted water. Large areas of standing water caused by flooding also contribute to mosquito-borne illnesses. Furthermore, crowded evacuees in shelters increase the risk of disease propagation.

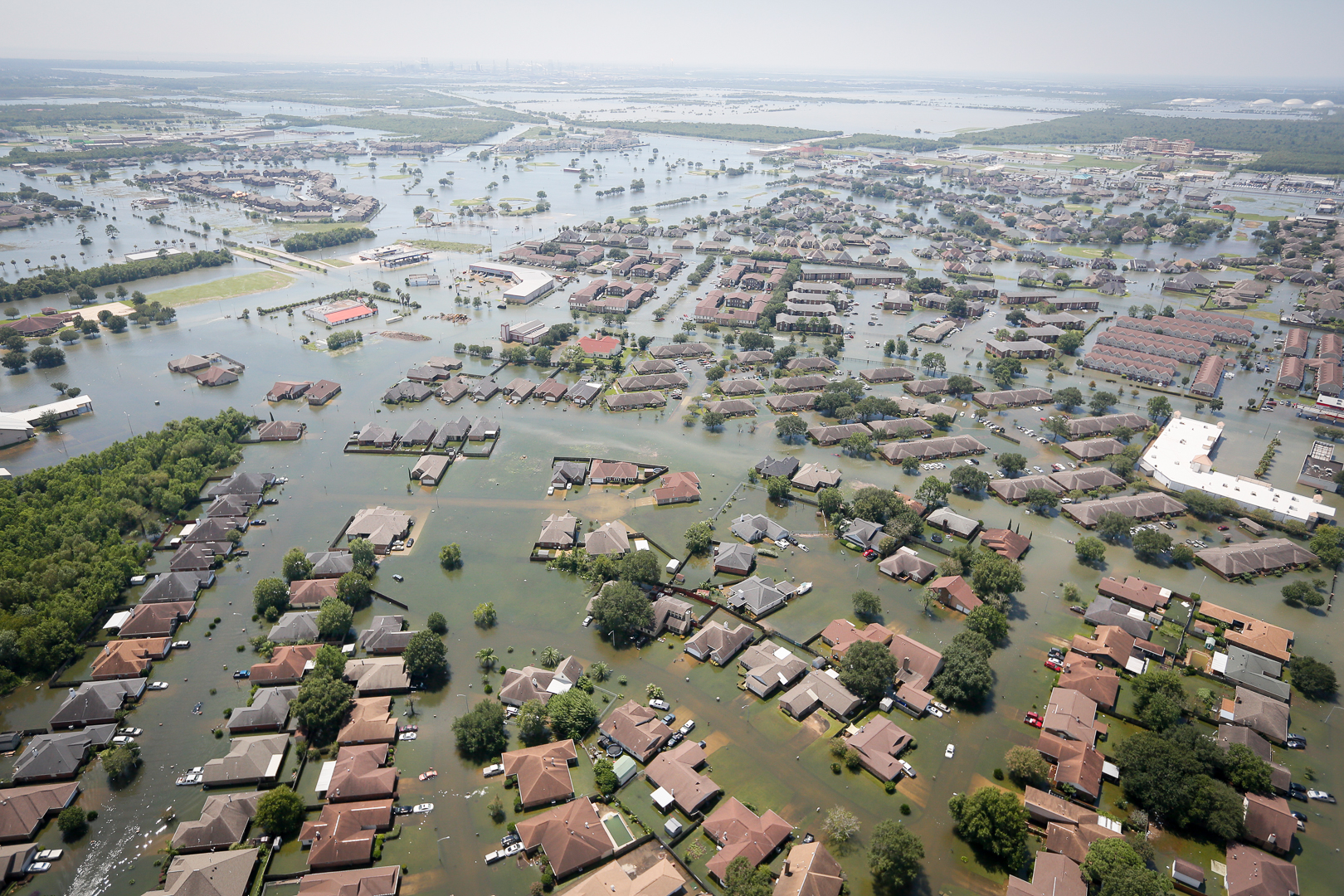
Flooding in Port Arthur, Texas caused by Hurricane Harvey. Harvey was the wettest and second-costliest tropical cyclone in United States history.

Although cyclones take an enormous toll in lives and personal property, they may be important factors in the precipitation regimes of places they affect and bring much-needed precipitation to otherwise dry regions. Hurricanes in the eastern north Pacific often supply moisture to the Southwestern United States and parts of Mexico. Japan receives over half of its rainfall from typhoons. Hurricane Camille (1969) averted drought conditions and ended water deficits along much of its path, though it also killed 259 people and caused $9.14 billion (2005 USD) in damage.

On the other hand, the occurrence of tropical cyclones can cause tremendous variability in rainfall over the areas they affect: indeed cyclones are the primary cause of the most extreme rainfall variability in the world, as observed in places such as Onslow and Port Hedland in subtropical Australia where the annual rainfall can range from practically nothing with no cyclones to over 1,000 millimetres (39 in) if cyclones are abundant.

=== Tornadoes ===
The broad rotation of a land-falling tropical cyclone often (though not commonly) spawns tornadoes, particularly in their right front quadrant. While these tornadoes are normally not as strong as their non-tropical counterparts, heavy damage or loss of life can still occur. Tornadoes can also be spawned as a result of eyewall mesovortices, which persist until landfall.

== Deaths ==
Deaths per year from tropical cyclones
Australia	5
United States	25
East Asia	740
Globally	10000

During the last two centuries, tropical cyclones have been responsible for the deaths of about 1.9 million people worldwide. It is estimated that 10,000 people per year perish due to tropical cyclones. The deadliest tropical cyclone was the 1970 Bhola cyclone, which had a death toll of anywhere from 300,000 to 500,000 lives.

A 2024 peer-reviewed study published in Nature found a robust increase in excess mortality that persisted for 15 years after each geophysical event. On average, after each tropical cyclone, the study found there were 7,000–11,000 excess deaths, exceeding the average of 24 immediate deaths reported in government statistics. In total, the study estimated tropical storms since 1930 have contributed to between 3.6 million and 5.2 million deaths in the U.S. alone – as much as all deaths combined nationwide during the same period from motor vehicle accidents, infectious diseases, and battle deaths. By contrast, official government statistics place the death toll from tropical cyclones at only 10,000 during this same period. The study found 25% of infant deaths and 15% of all deaths among people aged 1 to 44 in the U.S. are related to tropical cyclones. The study found 13% of all deaths in Florida are linked to tropical cyclones.

=== United States ===
Before Hurricane Katrina, which combined storm-tide flooding with levee-breach (dam) flooding from Lake Pontchartrain, the average death rate for tropical cyclones in the United States had been decreasing. The main cause of storm-related fatalities had been shifting away from storm surge and towards freshwater (rain) flooding. However, the median death rate per storm had increased through 1979, with a lull during the 1980–1995 period. This was due to greater numbers of people moving to the coastal margins and into harm's way. Despite advances in warning strategies and reduction in track forecast error, this increase in fatalities is expected to continue for as long as people migrate towards the shore.

== Reconstruction and repopulation ==
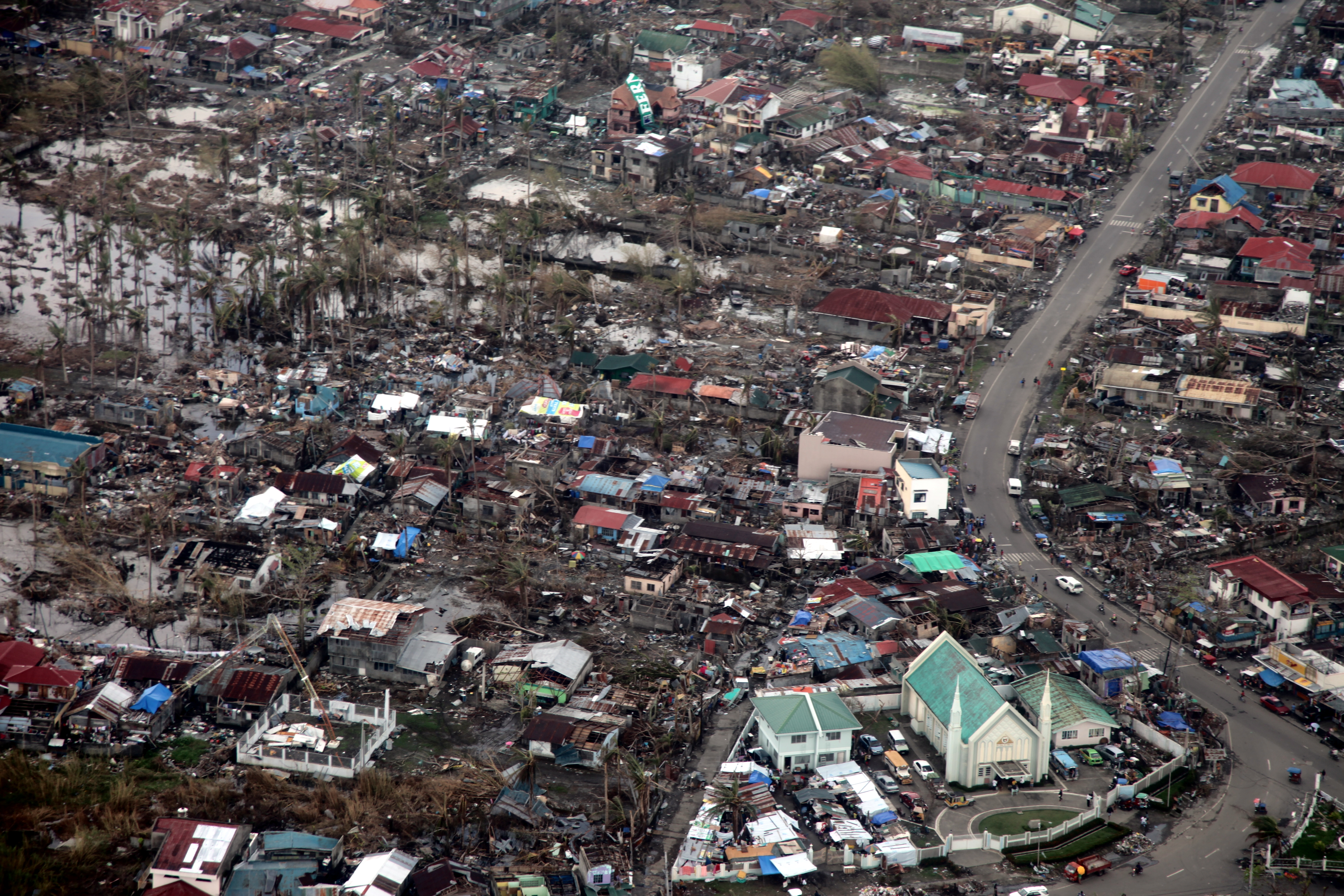
Aerial image of destroyed houses in Tacloban, following Typhoon Haiyan

While tropical cyclones may well seriously damage settlement, total destruction encourages rebuilding. For example, the destruction wrought by Hurricane Camille on the Gulf coast spurred redevelopment, greatly increasing local property values. Research indicates that the typical hurricane strike raises real house prices by a few percent for a number of years, with a maximum effect of between 3 percent to 4 percent three years after occurrence. However, disaster response officials point out that redevelopment encourages more people to live in clearly dangerous areas subject to future deadly storms. Hurricane Katrina is the most obvious example, as it devastated the region that had been revitalized after Hurricane Camille. Many former residents and businesses do relocate to inland areas away from the threat of future hurricanes as well.

In isolated areas with small populations, tropical cyclones may cause enough casualties to contribute to the founder's effect as survivors repopulate their place. For example, around 1775, a typhoon hit Pingelap Atoll, and in combination with a subsequent famine, reduced the island's population to a low level. Several generations after the disaster, as many as 10% of Pingelapese have a genetic form of color-blindness called achromatopsia. This is due to one of the survivors of the depopulation brought on by the typhoon having a mutated gene, which the population bottleneck caused to be at a higher-than-usual level in succeeding generations.

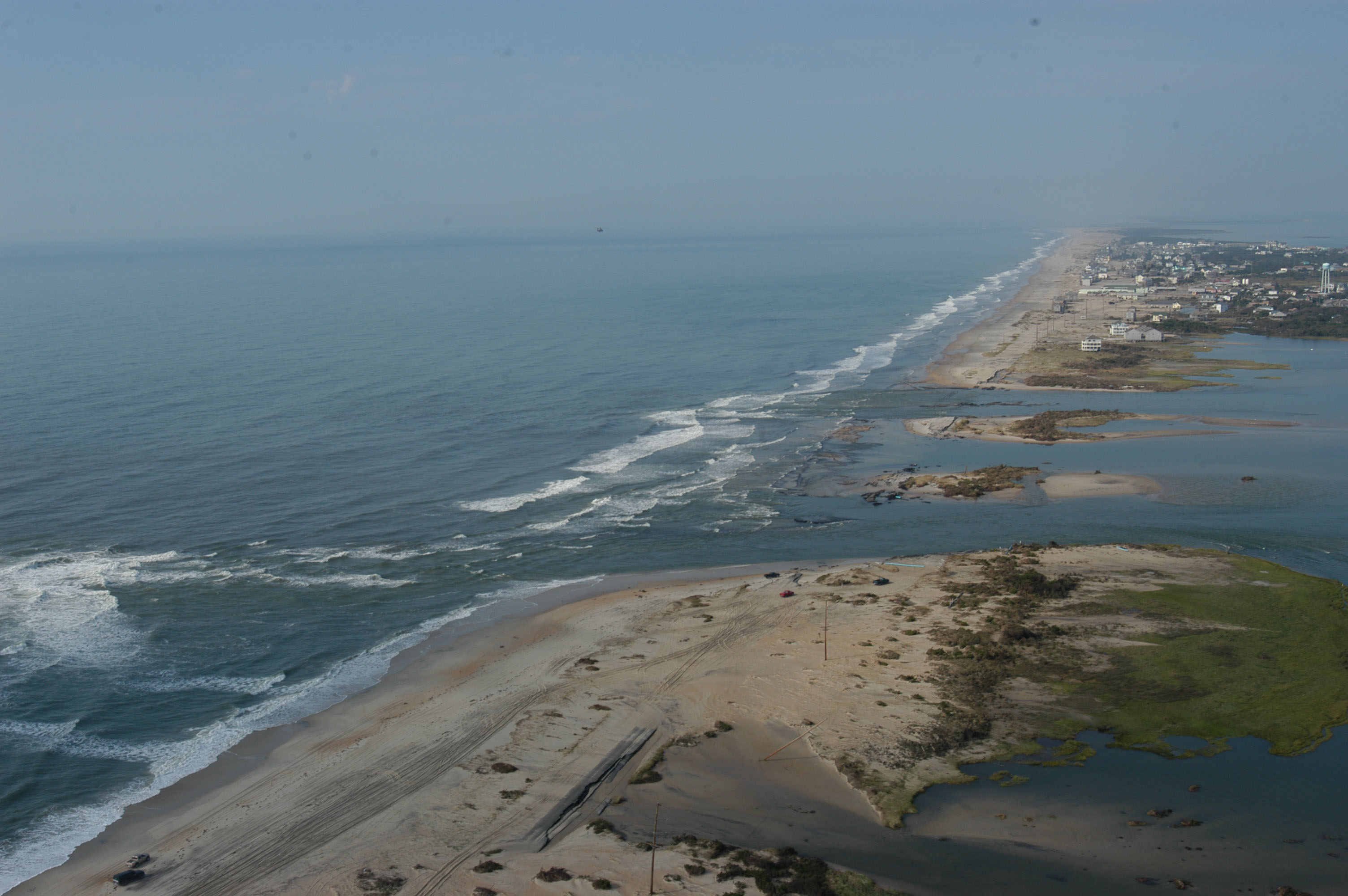
Hurricane Isabel (2003)'s effect on the North Carolina Outer Banks

== Effects on natural resources ==
=== Geomorphology ===
Tropical cyclones reshape the geology near the coast by eroding sand from the beach as well as offshore, rearranging coral, and changing dune configuration onshore. Their rainwater gets absorbed into stalagmites within caves, creating a record of past tropical cyclone impacts.

==== Coastal ridges ====
Waves and storm surges accompanying tropical cyclones undersea sands, erode shell deposits, break off corals from near shore reefs in their paths, and carry all this detritus landwards in a rolling wave of material that is deposited onshore, above highest astronomical tide as a ridge of sand, shell and coral. For example, each severe tropical cyclone (i.e. Category 4–5 on the Saffir-Simpson scale) crossing northeast Australia's tropical coastline since the last significant change in sea levels (about 5,000 years ago) has 'emplaced' such ridges within the coastal landscape forming, in some places, series of ridges and a geomorphological record of highest magnitude cyclones hitting the coast over 3,000–5,000 years.

Eyewitness accounts verify ridges of this kind are formed by severe tropical cyclones and two clear examples cited are the 18 kilometres (11 mi) long, 35 metres (115 ft) wide, 3.5 metres (11 ft) high coral shingle ridge deposited on Funafuti Atoll (Central South Pacific) by Cyclone Bebe in October 1972, and the large coral shingle ridge deposited on Jaluit Atoll (Marshall Islands) by Typhoon Ophelia in January 1958. In tropical northeast Australia, an intense tropical cyclone hit in March 1918 (crossing over the town of Innisfail), at which time there were eyewitness accounts of a 4.5 metres (15 ft) to 5.1 metres (17 ft) high ridge of pumice being deposited by that cyclone's surge as it crossed the coast.).

==== Limestone cave stalagmites ====
When tropical cyclones cross land, thin layers of calcium carbonate of 'light' composition (i.e. unusual isotopic ratio of Oxygen-18 and Oxygen-16) are deposited onto stalagmites in limestone caves up to 300 kilometres (190 mi) from the cyclone's path.

As the cloud tops of tropical cyclones are high and cold, and their air is humid – their rainwater is 'lighter'. In other words, the rainfall contains significantly higher quantities of unevaporated Oxygen-18 than other tropical rainfall. The isotopically lighter rainwater soaks into the ground, percolates down into caves, and, within a couple of weeks, Oxygen-18 transfers from the water into calcium carbonate, before being deposited in thin layers or 'rings' within stalagmites. A succession of such events created within stalagmites maintain a record of cyclones tracking within a 300 kilometres (190 mi) radius of caves going back centuries, millennia, or even millions of years.

At Actun Tunichil Muknal cave in central Belize, researchers drilling stalagmites with a computer- controlled dental drill accurately identified and verified evidence of isotopically light rainfall for 11 tropical cyclones occurring over a 23-year period (1978–2001).

At the Chillagoe limestone caves in northeast Australia (130 kilometres (81 mi) inland from Cairns) researchers identified and matched evidence of isotopically light rainfall with 100 years of cyclone records, and from this have created a record of tropical cyclones from 2004 back to 1200 A.D. (an 800-year record).

=== Landscapes ===
Severe tropical cyclones defoliate tropical forest canopy trees, remove vines and epiphytes from the trees, break tree crown stems, and cause tree falls. The degree of damage they do along their paths, at a landscape level (i.e. > 10 kilometres (6.2 mi)), can be catastrophic yet variable and patchy. Trees will break at 42 m/s (150 km/h; 94 mph), regardless of size and type. Stripping trees and scattering forest debris also provides fuel for wildfires, such as a blaze that lasted three months in 1989 and burned 460 square miles (1,200 km^{2}) of forest that had been stripped by Hurricane Gilbert.

- Wind velocity gradients or horizontal wind shear (size of cyclone, the intensity of cyclone, proximity to the cyclone, and local scale cyclonic convection effects).
- Degree of exposure (windward exposure, leeward acceleration, or local topographic sheltering/shading); and
- Ecosystem species composition and forest structure

Assessments of cyclone damage done to tropical rainforest landscapes in northeast Australia, have produced the following typology for describing and 'mapping' the variable impacts they have along their paths, as follows:

1. Severe and extensive closest to the centre of cyclone: impact appears to be multidirectional and is evidenced by crowns of most trees having been broken, smashed or windthrown
2. Severe and localised closer to the cyclone centre than its edge: direction of the destructive winds is clearly identifiable, and severe canopy disruption is limited to the windward aspect of these forested areas
3. Moderate canopy disturbance closer to cyclone edge than its centre: most of the tree stems are still standing, with only some treefalls, and most of the damage is the defoliation of the canopy and branch breakage;
4. Slight canopy disturbance closest to cyclone edge: occasional stem fall or branch breakage, with most of the damage consisting of loss of foliage on the forest edges only, subsequently followed by leaf damage and heavy leaf litter falls.

== See also ==
- Tropical cyclone effects by region
- Tropical cyclones and climate change
