= The Girlfriend =

The Girlfriend or The Girl Friend may refer to:

- The Girl Friend, a 1926 Broadway musical
- The Girl Friend (film), a 1935 musical comedy
- The Girlfriend (1988 film), an Argentine-German historical drama
- "The Girlfriend" (The O.C.), a 2003 episode of The O.C.
- The Girlfriend (TV series), a 2025 psychological thriller television series
- The Girlfriend (2025 film), an Indian Telugu-language romantic drama film

== See also ==
- Girlfriend (disambiguation)
