= Retiro (Madrid) =

Coordinates: 40.408072°N 3.676729°W

- District of Madrid
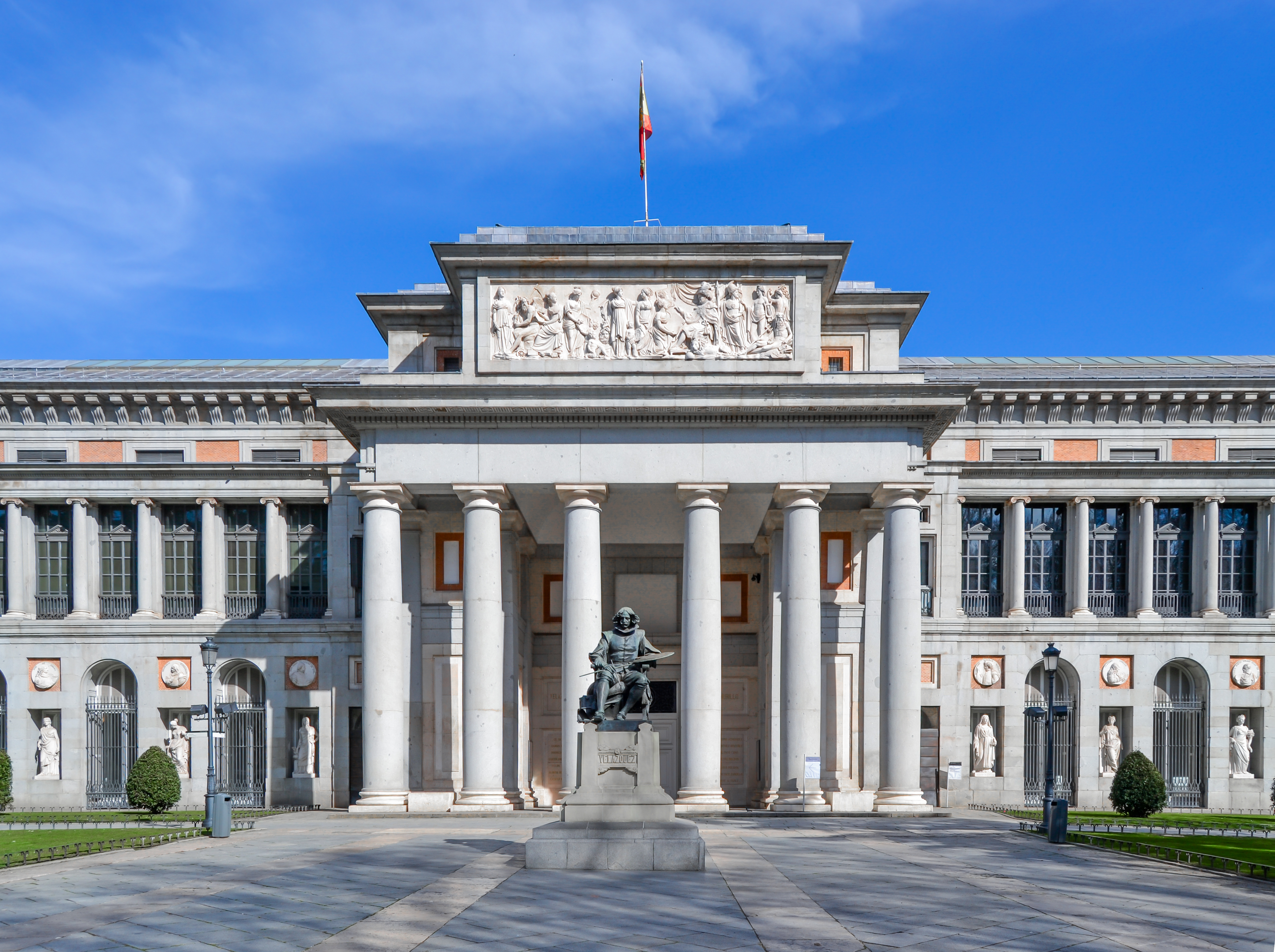
- Prado Museum

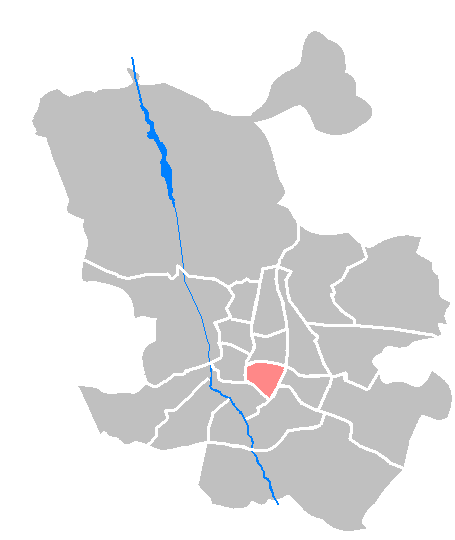
- Country: Spain
- Aut. community: Madrid
- Municipality: Madrid

Government
  - Councillor-President: Andrea Levy (PP, 2023)

Area
  - Total: 5.38 km^{2} (2.08 sq mi)

Population (2005)
  - Total: 126,058
  - Density: 23,400/km^{2} (61,000/sq mi)
- Postal code: 28032
- Madrid district number: 3

Retiro (Spanish pronunciation: [reˈtiɾo]) is a district located at the southeast of the city centre of Madrid, Spain. Its area is of 5.38 square kilometres (2.08 sq mi), the number of houses is 46,512 and the population, as of 2005, was of 126,058.

== History ==
Retiro's history has been strongly determined by the presence of the park with the same name and the railway facilities located at the south and west of this District.

Retiro Park, together with Paseo del Prado, has given its own personality to the area of Los Jerónimos, while the rest of the District is determined by Atocha Railway Station and previously also by Niño Jesús Station.

During the 20th Century, the area consolidated as residential areas for people with a growing economic power.

== Geography ==
=== Subdivision ===
The district is administratively divided into six wards (Barrios):

- Adelfas
- Estrella
- Ibiza
- Jerónimos
- Niño Jesús
- Pacífico

== See also ==
- Buen Retiro Park, largest urban park in Madrid
- Colegio Santa María del Pilar, a private school in the district
