= Niña =

Niña, or la Niña, may refer to:

- La Niña, an ocean-atmosphere phenomenon, the complement of El Niño
- Niña (name)
- Niña (ship), a ship used by Christopher Columbus in 1492.

== Arts and entertainment ==
=== Television ===
- Niña Amada Mía (telenovela), a Mexican soap opera
- La niña (TV series), a Colombian drama series

=== Music ===
- "Niña", a song by La 5ª Estación from Flores de Alquiler, 2004
- "Niña", a song by Locomía from Loco Vox, 1991
- "Niña", a song by Reik from Reik, 2005
- La Niña (album), a 2021 album by Spanish singer Lola Índigo
- La Niña (singer) (born 1991), Italian singer-songwriter and actress

== See also ==
- Nina (disambiguation)
- Nena (disambiguation)
- Niño (disambiguation)
