= Girl (comics) =

Girl or Girls, in comics, may refer to:

- Girl (UK comics), a British comic magazine from Hulton Press
- Girl (Vertigo), a Vertigo mini-series by Peter Milligan
- Girl, a 1991 title from Rip Off Press
- Girl Comics, a title from Timely Comics and Marvel Comics
- Girl One and Girl Two, characters from Alan Moore's Top Ten comics
- Girls (comics), an Image Comics series by the Luna Brothers

== See also ==
- Girl (disambiguation)
