= Niños =

Niños is the Spanish word for children. The term may also refer to:

- The Niños Héroes, six famous soldiers during the Mexican-American War
- Juego de Niños, a Mexican horror film

== See also ==
- Niño (disambiguation)
