= Loco Vox =

Studio album by Locomía
- Released: 1991
- Genre: Pop; Europop
- Label: Hispavox

Locomía chronology
Taiyo (1989)	Loco Vox (1991)	Party Time (1992)

Loco Vox is the second studio album by Spanish Europop group Locomía. As in the debut, the line-up consisted of a quartet, which included: Xavier Font, Juan Antonio Fuentes, Carlos Armas and Manuel Arjona. Its music incorporates the pop music that was successful at the time in Europe with Latin rhythms.

To promote it, four singles were released: "Loco Vox", "Fiesta Latina", "Niña" and "Magia Negra" all of them were sung in various TV programs and two music video were made that highlighted their new visual, now more sober than those used at the time of Taiyos promotion, with the predominance, above all, of black and white colors.

It was commercially successful, went gold and platinum in five countries, most of them in Latin America, and sales reached 800,000 copies worldwide, making it the second best seller of their career.

At the end of the publicity work, Juan Antonio Fuentes left the group and was replaced by Santos Blanco López.

== Background and production ==
The year 1990 marked the height of success for the group Locomía, their debut album, titled Taiyo, had sold more than 1 million copies, which earned the group numerous gold and platinum certifications, especially in Latin American countries. Thinking about taking advantage of the good phase, his manager and owner of the record company, decided to start recording what would be their second studio album. For this new release, the rhythms that favored Europop and Latin rhythms of the predecessor was maintained. However, the group radically changed their look, although they had not abandoned the large shoulder pads, they now presented themselves to the public with a more sober style with a clear predominance of black and white.

== Release and promotion ==
To promote it, four singles were chosen: "Loco Vox", "Fiesta Latina", "Niña" and "Magia Negra", which were sung in TV shows and the tour, in addition to two music videos that featured the quartet's outstanding choreography and costumes.

"Loco Vox" debuted on the Mexican charts of Notitas Musicales magazine in the second half of September at number 14. In its second week it dropped to number 16, and peaked at number 12 in the following fortnight. In Spain, it reached #8 on the hit charts.

== Commercial performance ==
Commercially, it was successful. In Spain, it peaked at number 28 among the best sellers, seven positions above its predecessor, which peaked at number 35. On December 28, 1991, the Mexican newspaper El Siglo de Torreón reported that the group had just been certified platinum in Chile for 25,000 copies sold. According to the official website, some time later, they were awarded a double platinum disc, becoming the biggest success of their career in that country. In Mexico, where they were in a publicity marathon in November 1991, they received a gold certification for 150,000 records sold. After selling 300,000 copies, it was certified platinum, making it his biggest hit in Mexico.

The album was certified gold or platinum in three more countries: Argentina, Peru and Uruguay. In this way, it became the second biggest hit of their career, with 800,000 copies sold worldwide.

== Track listing ==
No.	Title	Length
1.	"Loco Vox"	3:50
2.	"Fiesta Latina"	3:18
3.	"Sueños De Papel"	3:25
4.	"Sirocco"	4:32
5.	"Sedúceme"	3:40
6.	"África"	4:27
7.	"Niña"	3:35
8.	"Magia Negra"	3:50
9.	"Deseo"	3:00
10.	"Taum'ma"	4:02

== Charts ==
Chart (1990)	Peak position
Spain (Promusicae)	28

== Certifications and sales ==
Region	Certification	Certified units/sales
Argentina (CAPIF)	Gold	30,000^{^}
Chile	2× Platinum	50,000
Mexico (AMPROFON)	Platinum	250,000^{^}
Peru	Platinum	
Uruguay (CUD)	2× Gold	6,000^{^}
Summaries
Worldwide	—	800,000
^{^} Shipments figures based on certification alone.
