= Girlfriend (Kap G song) =

Single by Kap G

Single by Kap G

from the album El Southside
- Released: March 7, 2016
- Length: 3:18
- Label: Atlantic
- Songwriter: George Ramirez
- Producer: Squat Beats

Kap G singles chronology
"Like El Chapo" (2015)	"Girlfriend" (2016)	"Vámonos" (2016)

Music video
- "Girlfriend" on YouTube

"Girlfriend" is a song by American rapper Kap G, released on March 7, 2016 as the second single from his mixtape El Southside (2016). It was produced by Squat Beats, and is considered Kap G's breakout hit.

== Background ==
The song centers on Kap G having taken and entered a relationship with someone else's girlfriend, including "kicking shit" and smoking blunts. He describes her as "thick and pretty", comparing her to model Amber Rose, and mentions she works at the Atlanta strip club Blue Flame. In an interview with Genius, Kap G spoke about his inspiration for the song:

I had just took somebody girlfriend that day, but honestly that day was horrible. I was in DJ Drama's Means Streets Studio, and I was having the worst day. I was waiting on my label to put out my music, and I was down, bro. Then my main producer, Squat, was like, "Bro let's just go to my studio get a different vibe." I wasn't even gonna go, 'cause I was so down, but I was like, "Fuck it, I'mma go." And when I went, I made "Girlfriend." That's how I heard the beat, and that's what came out. I just freestyled it.

== Music video ==
A music video for the song was directed by Jon J. and premiered on April 5, 2016. It sees Kap G riding around a neighborhood in a doorless Jeep, getting close with a beautiful woman and going to a strip club. In the end, he is dropped off by the woman in front of her boyfriend.

== Remixes ==
An official remix of the song was released on October 21, 2016. It features American singer Ty Dolla Sign and American rapper Quavo.

== Critical reception ==
Shanna Collins of Vibe criticized the song for misogyny and commented, "The remix makes the already problematic joint even more repetitive and monotonous." In addition, she wrote, "the remix of 'Girlfriend' disparagingly smacks of false bravado. As the trio brag about taking a flick, smoking blunts, and then quickly disposing of women like objects on the song's hook, the flavor comes off more as f*ck boy than deeply impressive. It's the kind of song that makes you cringe not only for the blatant disrespect of women of color who are avid listeners of the genre, but to the creator themselves for doing hip-hop such an artistic disservice."

Fact placed the song on its list of "The 20 best rap and R&B tracks of 2016".

== Charts ==
Chart (2016)	Peak position
US Bubbling Under Hot 100 (Billboard)	10
US Bubbling Under R&B/Hip-Hop Singles (Billboard)	3
US Rhythmic Airplay (Billboard)	22

== Certifications ==
Region	Certification	Certified units/sales
United States (RIAA)	Platinum	1,000,000^{‡}
^{‡} Sales+streaming figures based on certification alone.
