= Estrella (Madrid) =

Neighborhood of Madrid, Spain

Coordinates: 40°24′49″N 3°39′51″W

- City neighborhood
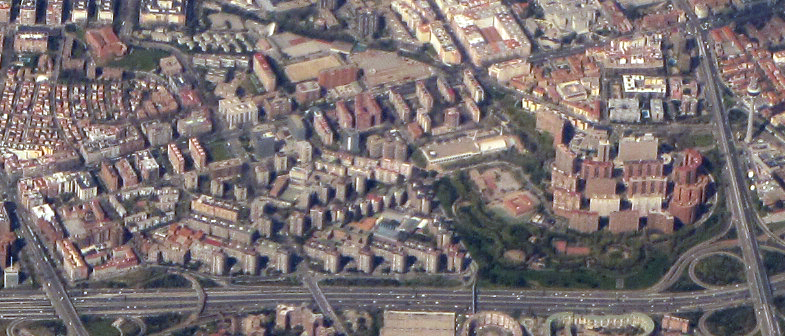
- Interactive map of Estrella
- Country: Spain
- Region: Community of Madrid
- Municipality: Madrid
- District: Retiro

Area
  - Total: 1.025805 km^{2} (0.396066 sq mi)

Population (2020)
  - Total: 23,474
  - Density: 22,883/km^{2} (59,268/sq mi)

Estrella is an administrative neighborhood (barrio) of Madrid belonging to the district of Retiro.

It has an area of 1.025805 km^{2} (0.396066 sq mi). As of 1 March 2020, it has a population of 23,474.
