= The Girl (novel) =

Novel by Meridel Le Sueur

- First edition
- Author: Meridel Le Sueur
- Language: English
- Genre: Fiction
- Set in: Minnesota
- Publisher: West End Press
- Publication date: 1978
- Publication place: United States
- Media type: Print
- Pages: 148
- ISBN: 0931122066
- OCLC: 4876650
- Dewey Decimal: 813.52
- LC Class: PZ3.L56783
- Website: https://meridellesueur.org/

The Girl (1939; 1978) is a novel by Meridel Le Sueur set during Prohibition and chronicling the development of a young woman from a naive small-town girl into a participant in a bank robbery.

== Plot ==
It tells the story of a nameless girl from rural Minnesota who works in a bar in St. Paul. Clara, a fellow waitress working as a prostitute on the side, takes the girl under her wing as she learns the rudimentaries of love and sex, but also of rape, prostitution, abortion, and domestic violence. Along with the bar-owner Belle and the labor organizer Amelia, Clara and the girl watch their unemployed men self-destruct one by one under the grinding conditions of the Depression. Impregnated by her lover Butch, the girl secretly defies his demand that she get an abortion, hoping that the money from a bank robbery will enable them to get married. However, Butch and three other men are shot and killed during the crime, and the girl, dependent on state assistance during her pregnancy, is forced into a relief maternity home where sterilization after delivery is routine. Amelia rescues the girl before she has her baby, but fails to save Clara from state-mandated electric shock treatments that shatter her health and her sanity. The novel ends with the climactic conjunction of three dramatic events: a mass demonstration demanding "Milk and Iron Pills for Clara," Clara's death scene, and the birth of the girl's baby. The novel closes as an intergenerational community of women vow to "let our voice be heard in the whole city" (130). Link text

== Publication history ==
Originally completed in 1939, the book was blacklisted during the McCarthy Era for its alleged Communist ideas. In the 1970s, Le Sueur modified the story, making Girl's baby a girl instead of a boy, and the book was eventually published in 1978.

The Meridel LeSueur Family Circle took control of the publishing rights in 2019 and published the third edition in 2022 with a new foreword by Margaret Randall and a new essay by Becka Tilsen, one of Meridel's great granddaughters.
