= El Niño (disambiguation) =

El Niño is a global coupled ocean-atmosphere phenomenon, the warm phase of the El Niño–Southern Oscillation.

El Niño may also refer to:

- El Niño (Cosculluela album), 2011
- El Niño (Def Squad album), 1998
- El Niño (Eldritch album), 1998
- El Niño (film), 2014 action thriller film directed by Daniel Monzón
- El Niño (opera), by American composer John Adams
- El Niño, a race car in the video game Need for Speed III: Hot Pursuit
- El Niño, a nickname of seaman Pedro Alonso Niño
- El Niño, a nickname of Spanish golfer Sergio García
- El Niño, a nickname of Spanish footballer Fernando Torres
- El Niño, a nickname of baseball player Hanley Ramírez
- El Niño, a nickname of baseball player Fernando Tatís Jr.
- Jordi El Niño Polla (born Ángel Muñoz, 1994), Spanish pornographic actor, producer and internet personality
- El Niño, a nickname of hockey player Nino Niederreiter
- El Niño, a nickname of mixed martial artist Gilbert Melendez
- El Niño, a nickname of Miguel Rafael Martos Sánchez (known as Raphael (singer))
- El Niño, a fictional airline of a non-existing country San Escobar
- El Niño, a 1998 single by Agnelli & Nelson
- 1982–83 El Niño event
- 1997–98 El Niño event

== See also ==
- Niño (disambiguation)
- Ill Niño, an American heavy metal band formerly called El Niño
- La Niña (disambiguation)
- Child Jesus
