= Girlfriend (Grace Ives album) =

Studio album by Grace Ives
- Released: March 20, 2026
- Recorded: 2023–2025
- Genre: Pop
- Length: 36:36
- Labels: True Panther; Capitol
- Producers: Grace Ives; Ariel Rechtshaid; John DeBold

Grace Ives chronology
Janky Star (2022)	Girlfriend (2026)

Singles from Girlfriend
- 1. "Avalanche" Released: November 7, 2025; 2. "Dance with Me" Released: November 7, 2025; 3. "My Mans" Released: November 7, 2025; 4. "Stupid Bitches" Released: February 20, 2026

Girlfriend is the third studio album by the American singer-songwriter Grace Ives. It was released on March 20, 2026, through True Panther Sounds and Capitol Records. The album received universal acclaim from music critics.

== Background and development ==
Ives wrote the album herself, with co-production from Ariel Rechtshaid and John DeBold. After releasing her second studio album Janky Star (2022), she began work on Girlfriend shortly after touring in support of the record, writing and recording much of the material independently. It was recorded over a two-year period in Los Angeles. The album emerged from a period in which she had reached what she described as "true rock bottom", during which she had been "drinking, lying, and hiding". After becoming sober, Ives challenged herself to pursue new experiences without alcohol. While working on the album, she shifted from "escaping to exploring", explaining that a sense of personal freedom allowed her "to take up space" and gave her the opportunity "to fail, to experiment, and to become more honest".

The album was announced on February 20, 2026, alongside the release of the single "Stupid Bitches". The earlier singles "Avalanche", "Dance With Me", and "My Mans" had been released in November 2025.

== Critical reception ==
Professional ratings
Aggregate scores
Source	Rating
Metacritic	86/100
Review scores
Source	Rating
Clash	8/10
The Guardian	4/5 stars
The Independent	4/5 stars
Pitchfork	8.4/10

According to the review aggregator Metacritic, Girlfriend received "universal acclaim" based on a weighted average score of 86 out of 100 from five critic scores.

Hattie Lindert of Pitchfork awarded the album the accolade Best New Music, saying that she released "a razor-sharp, refreshingly self-serious album" and arguing that every track could become a single but together "they add up to a sum greater than its parts". To Lindert, the album "feels perpetually airborne" as it "synthesizes the sensation of abandon with remarkable clarity".

Writing for The Guardian, Laura Snapes compared the record to Lorde's Melodrama (2017) and Sky Ferreira's Night Time, My Time (2013), noting a shared sense of "conspiratorial sweetness and broken-mirror glitter". She also observed that Grace's songs "bubble with detail" while never smothering "her off-the-cuff vocals". Robin Murray of Clash described the album as a "fun pop record" and a "stellar return". Helen Brown at The Independent found it "a hard record to get a grip on", noting that Ives "sounds braver than ever" on it.

== Track listing ==
Girlfriend track listing
No.	Title	Writer(s)	Length
1.	"Now I'm"	Grace Ives; Samuel Acchione; John DeBold	2:00
2.	"Avalanche"	Ives; DeBold	3:12
3.	"Fire 2"	Ives; DeBold	4:22
4.	"Drink Up"	Ives; DeBold; Ariel Rechtshaid	3:40
5.	"My Mans"	Ives; DeBold	3:47
6.	"Dance with Me"	Ives; Debold; Rechtshaid	3:48
7.	"Neither You Nor I"	Ives; DeBold; Rechtshaid	2:40
8.	"Trouble"	Ives; DeBold; Rechtshaid	3:17
9.	"What If"	Ives; DeBold; Rechtshaid	3:01
10.	"Garden"	Ives; DeBold; Rechtshaid	3:18
11.	"Stupid Bitches"	Ives; DeBold; Rechtshaid	3:31
Total length:			36:36

== Personnel ==
Credits adapted from Tidal.

- Grace Ives – vocals, drum programming, programming, production (all tracks); synthesizer (tracks 2–11), piano (2–6, 8–10), Mellotron (3, 6, 9–11), strings (3, 6, 11), grand piano (3), guitar (6, 8), pump organ (6), toy piano (8), organ (9, 10), tack piano (9); animal sounds, Rhodes (10)
- Ariel Rechtshaid – production, engineering (all tracks); drum programming (1–9, 11), programming (1, 3–11); congas, glockenspiel (1); vocals (5); percussion, synthesizer, upright bass (7); guitars, bass (9)
- John DeBold – production, engineering (all tracks); drum programming, programming (1–8, 11); vocals (1, 3, 4, 6, 10), strings (3, 6, 11), guitar (4, 6), bass (8), background vocals (9), synthesizer (10, 11), acoustic guitar (10), cello (11)
- Kyle Parker Smith – engineering
- Dave Fridmann – mixing
- Jon Fridmann – mixing assistance
- Emily Lazar – mastering
- Bob DeMaa – mastering assistance
- Ben Lumsdaine – drums (1, 4, 10)
- Sam Acchione – guitar (1)
- Isaac Lee-Kronick – guitar (6, 10)
- Adam Hong – engineering (8)
- Buddy Ross – acoustic guitar, drum programming, programming, synthesizer, Wurlitzer electric piano, additional production (10)
- Christian Taylor – drums (11)
