= Cyclonic Niño =

Climatological phenomenon

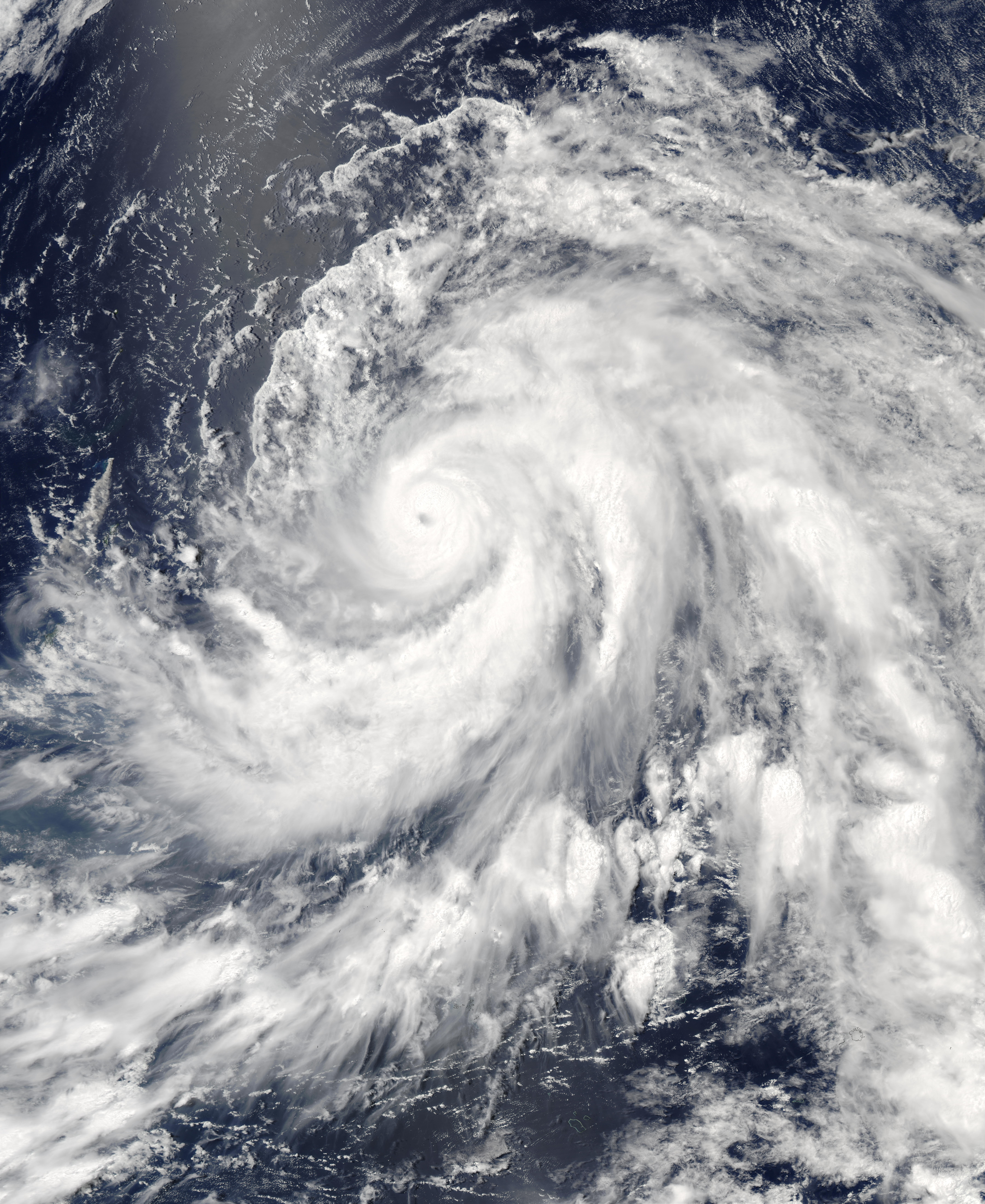
Typhoon Chan-Hom in 2003

Cyclonic Niño is a climatological phenomenon that has been observed in climate models where tropical cyclone activity is increased. Increased tropical cyclone activity mixes ocean waters, introducing cooling in the upper layer of the ocean that quickly dissipates and warming in deeper layers that lasts considerably more, resulting in a net warming of the ocean.

In climate simulations of the Pliocene, this net warming is then transported by ocean currents and part of it ends up in the Eastern Pacific, warming it relative to the Western Pacific and thus creating El Niño (Note: Present-day El Niño is a climate phenomenon that occurs every three to seven years, during which warm water masses appear in the Eastern Pacific, suppressing upwelling there. In the Western Pacific conversely precipitation and temperature both decrease. Tropical Kelvin waves associated with the Madden–Julian oscillation and Yanai waves can favour the onset of El Niño events.)-like conditions. Reconstructed temperatures in the Pliocene have shown an El Niño-like pattern of ocean temperatures that may be explained by increased tropical cyclone activity and thus increased temperatures in the Eastern Pacific. Some of the heat is transported away from the tropics and may be responsible for past episodes of warmer-than-usual climate, such as in the Eocene and Cretaceous, although there is no agreement on the predominant effects of tropical cyclones on heat transport away from the tropics. There is evidence that under present-day climate when conditions are right, typhoons might start El Niño events.

== Background ==
=== Tropical cyclones and ocean mixing ===
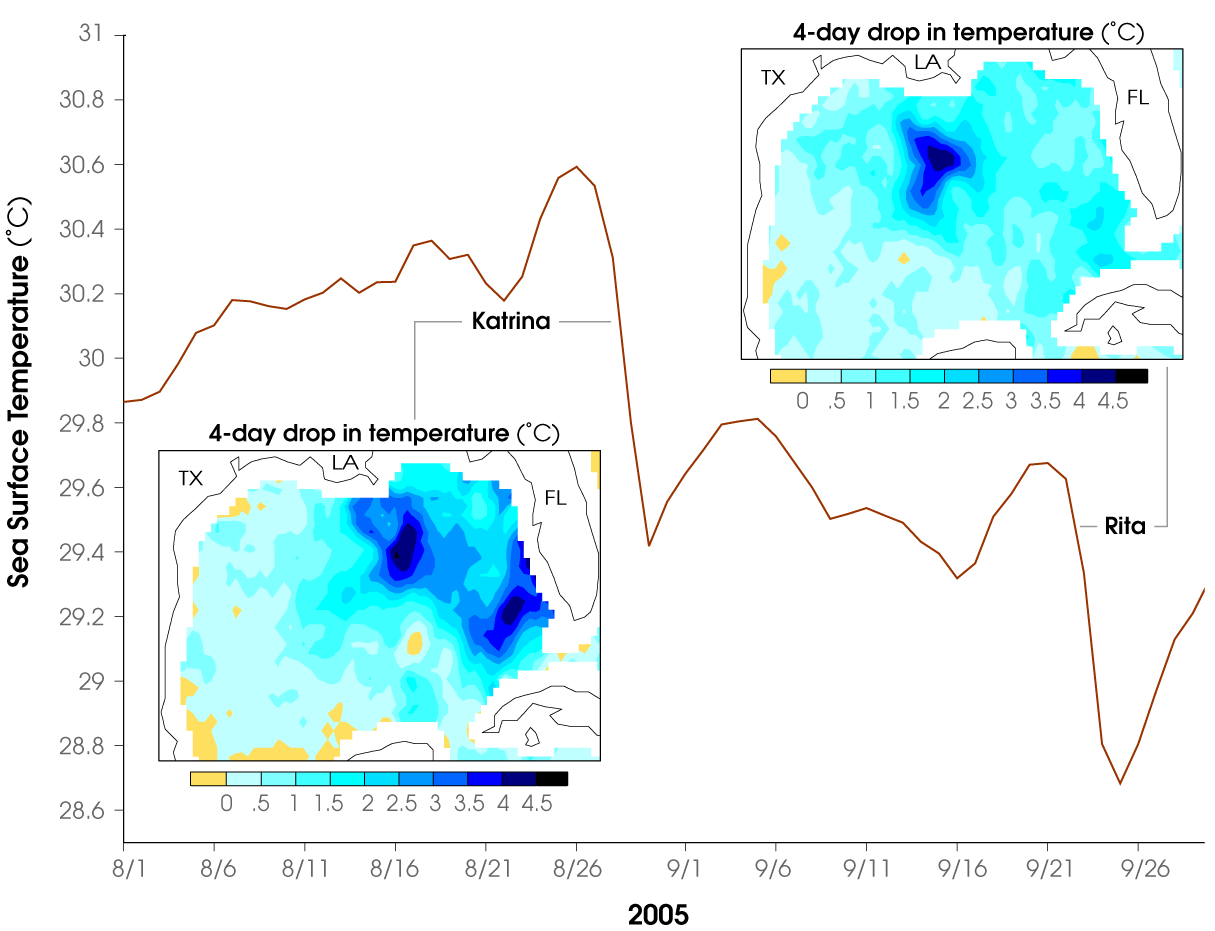
Depression of sea surface temperatures caused by Hurricane Katrina and Hurricane Rita in 2005

Tropical cyclones are dangerous and destructive weather phenomena that are responsible for nearly $10,000,000,000 damage every year in the United States alone. They also have diverse effects on the atmosphere and ocean, (Note: As an example, during the Little Ice Age when tropical cyclone activity in the area was depressed, the ocean was more strongly stratified close to Great Bahama Bank, probably reflecting a lowered tropical cyclone mediated mixing.) as their winds mix the upper ocean waters and draw up cold deep water; in addition, heat is extracted from the ocean, although this effect is small. The effects have usually been described as a temporary cooling of the water surface by up to 6 °C (11 °F) that tends to weaken the storm but is dissipated by the sea and the atmosphere in one-two months. This is accompanied by a much longer lasting warming of subsurface waters, although there is a certain complexity in response patterns; part (Note: According to one study 3/4 of the warming is dissipated in winter, when the mixed layer deepens.) of the subsurface warming tends to dissipate into the atmosphere through seasonal variations in the thermocline if it is not sufficiently deep. Moreover, other effects of tropical cyclones on the ocean such as the precipitation can alter or counteract the wind-driven effects. This potentially has effects on global heat transport; the effects on global climate is modest under current climate but could be stronger in warmer climates.

The net result of the mixing would thus be a warming of the ocean and a heat flux of between 260 and 400 TW, as well as – for a realistic distribution of tropical cyclones – a decreased heat transport out of the tropics with about 1/3 of the heat accumulating in the equatorial regions. (Note: The distribution of tropical cyclones implies that the transport of heat towards the poles is inhibited by the cyclone-induced mixing. Tropical cyclones usually occur within the area of the subtropical overturning circulation which retains the mixed-down heat. One 2015 computer simulation observed a strong heat accumulation in the tropics as a consequence.) Estimates of ocean heat content through satellite imaging support that tropical cyclone activity increases the heat content of the oceans, although there are some caveats and the effect on global heat fluxes is not particularly large under present-day tropical cyclone activity; however, according to one study the effect might be large enough to explain discrepancies between the steady state ocean mixing observed in the tropics and the amount required by planetary energetics, as the former is insufficient otherwise.

=== Pliocene ===
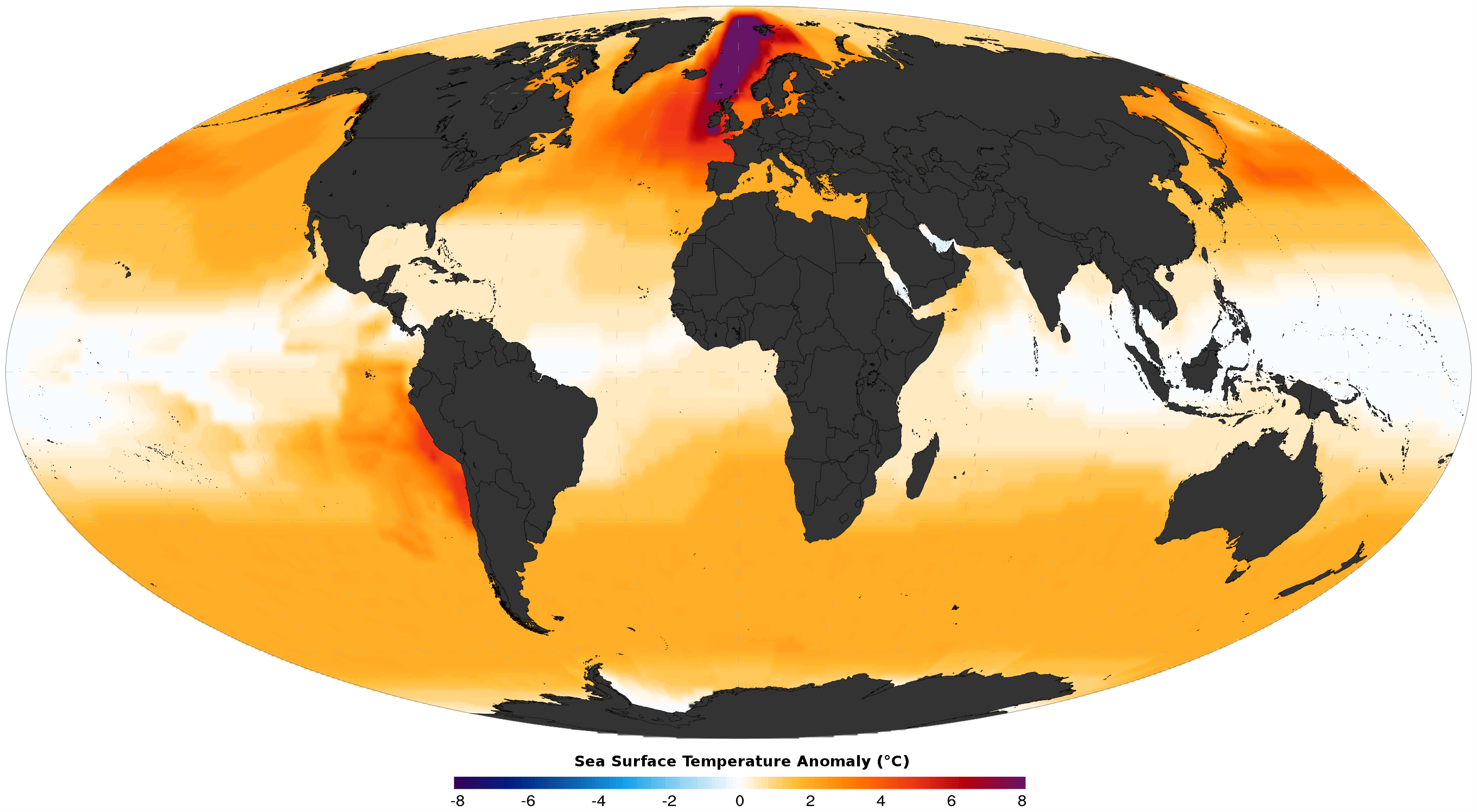
Sea surface temperature anomalies during the Pliocene

The concept has been formulated in discussions of Pliocene climates; during the Pliocene temperatures were 2–4 K (3.6–7.2 °F) higher than today and temperature gradients in the Pacific Ocean substantially smaller, meaning that the Eastern Pacific had similar temperatures to the Western Pacific, equivalent to strong El Niño conditions. Among the reconstructed effects are significantly moister conditions in the Southwestern United States than today. As greenhouse gas concentrations were not higher than today, other explanations have been sought for these temperature anomalies.

The existence of a permanent El Niño-like state however is not uncontested, and in some research results a more La Niña-like state of the Pacific Ocean. Climate models, sea surface temperatures reconstructed with alkenones (Note: Alkenones are organic compounds that can be used to reconstruct past temperatures.) and sometimes even reconstructions from foraminifera in the same drill core have yielded conflicting results. Coral-based reconstructions have been used in a 2011 study to infer that the El Niño–Southern Oscillation already existed during the Pliocene, including discrete El Niño events.

== Computer simulations concerning the Pliocene ==
Modelling with the CAM3 general circulation model has indicated that the number of tropical cyclones was much larger than today and their occurrence more extensive owing to higher sea surface temperatures and a weaker atmospheric circulation (the Hadley cell and Walker circulation) which results in less wind shear. Also, tropical cyclones last longer and occur throughout the year rather than being tied to specific reasons.

This expansion of tropical cyclone activity would bring tropical cyclones within reach of zones of the ocean where sea currents below the surface transport water towards the Eastern Pacific. Tropical cyclones induce mixing of the sea surface waters; with a tenfold increase in ocean mixing within two bands 8–40° north and south of the equator – especially mixing occurring in the Central Pacific where tropical cyclone activity is low under present-day climate – heat would be introduced into these sea currents and eventually lead to a warming of the central and eastern Pacific Ocean similar to El Niño and a warming of the upwelling regions, with a warming of about 2–3 °C (3.6–5.4 °F) in the zone of the East Pacific cold tongue. This effect can take up to a century to set in and its strength is dependent on the exact pattern of ocean mixing. It is also subject to positive feedback, as the warming of the eastern Pacific in turn increases tropical cyclone activity; eventually a climate state featuring a permanent El Niño and a weaker El Niño Southern Oscillation can arise.

During the mid-Piacenzian where carbon dioxide concentrations were close to present-day levels, Earth was about 2–4 °C (3.6–7.2 °F) warmer than present and simulations indicate that tropical cyclones were more intense; the modelled distribution of tropical cyclones however was different from the one reconstructed for other stages of the Pliocene. Simulations using the CESM climate model conducted in 2018 showed a reduced temperature gradient between the East and West Pacific and a deeper thermocline in response to tropical cyclone driven mixing and anomalous eastward sea currents in the Pacific; this is accompanied by a cooling of the areas where mixing is strongest and a warming of the Eastern Pacific. There are also effects on the East Asian monsoon such as a stronger winter monsoon but in the simulations the background climate of the Piacenzian was more significant than the tropical cyclone effects.

== Subsequent findings ==
Later researchers have suggested that the increased winds may actually strengthen the El Niño Southern Oscillation and that Eocene and Pliocene warm climates still featured an ENSO cycle. This does not necessarily imply that there still was an east–west temperature gradient in the Pacific Ocean, which instead might have featured an eastward expanded Pacific warm pool. Temperature reconstructions based on corals and reconstructed precipitation data from Chinese loess indicate that there was no permanent El Niño-like state. Another 2013 study with a different climate model indicated that tropical cyclones in the western Pacific may actually induce cooling of eastern Pacific sea surface temperatures. A 2015 simulation of tropical cyclogenesis did not show increased tropical cyclone genesis in the Pliocene, although the simulation did not obtain a decreased East-West Pacific temperature gradient and it did obtain increased tropical cyclone activity in the parts of the Central Pacific most critical for the occurrence of Cyclonic Niño effects. A 2018 simulation implied that adding tropical cyclone mixing induced climate phenomena to simulations of mid-Piacenzian climate can in some aspects improve and in others reduce the match between the modelled climate and the climate reconstructed from paleoclimate data. A 2019 study concluded that tropical cyclone activity in the Western Pacific is correlated to El Niño-associated temperature anomalies months later.

A 2010 climate simulation indicated that increasing the average winds of tropical cyclones induced warming in the Eastern Pacific and cooling in the Western Pacific, consistent with an El Niño like response; there is also strengthening of the Hadley cell of the atmospheric circulation and some heat is transported out of the tropics by the western boundary currents. Similar East-West temperature changes were obtained in other 2010 and 2011 studies; in the latter high latitude temperatures warmed by about 0.5–1 °C (0.90–1.80 °F) and a global warming by 0.2 °C (0.36 °F) and the former indicated that the heat is transported at depths of about 200 metres (660 ft) towards the Equatorial Undercurrent which then brings it into the Eastern Pacific. Similar effects but of much smaller magnitude are seen in the North Atlantic and other oceans and there are also changes to the Indonesian Throughflow. A 2013 study using tropical cyclones from the 2003 Pacific typhoon season including Typhoon Chan-hom showed that the tropical cyclone winds could induce eastward moving equatorial waves and suggested that such typhoon induced waves can start El Niño events when background conditions are favourable. A 2014 study showed a total increase in ocean heat content caused by the typhoons and hurricanes active between 2004 and late 2005. Another 2018 simulation shows that warm subsurface anomalies are transported eastward into the Eastern Pacific. A 2025 paper conversely found that most of this heat is transported into the Kuroshio Current although the current's heat transport itself is weakened by typhoon activity.

Non-oceanic mechanisms for tropical cyclone-induced El Niños may exist as well. The Madden–Julian oscillation is considered the most important source of westerly wind bursts in the equatorial Pacific, which drive the eastward flow of warm water that drives El Niño onset. During favourable phases of the MJO and when they are close to the equator, tropical cyclones in the Pacific induce westerly winds that play a major role in the onset of El Niño events such as the 2014–2016 El Niño event, and there is evidence that increased tropical cyclone activity precedes the onset of El Niño. Such processes also influence the intensity of the El Niño and other climatic processes.

== Concurrent effects on worldwide climate ==
Increased tropical cyclone activity during warmer climates might increase ocean heat transport, which could explain why climate records of warmer past climates often do not show much warming in the tropics compared to high latitude temperatures; the increased heat transport would remove heat more effectively from the tropics and thus keep temperatures stable even with changing rates of ocean heat transport. Tropical cyclone-induced moisture and heat fluxes weaken the Atlantic meridional overturning circulation and the mixed layer depth increases in tropical cyclone areas.

Such alteration of ocean heat transport by tropical cyclones has been used to explain other past climate states where Earth was warmer than today and the temperature gradient between the poles and the tropics smaller. This was the case for example during the late Cretaceous, during the Paleocene-Eocene thermal maximum during which temperatures in the Arctic exceeded 20 °C (68 °F) at times, during the Eocene and during the Pliocene between 3 and 5 million years ago.

== Effects ==
El Niño induced changes in atmospheric circulation

The "Cyclonic Niño" effect could partially explain temperature distributions in the Pliocene and a flattening of the oceanic thermocline during the Pliocene. The permanent El Niño conditions may have had effects similar to that of present-day El Niño, although this is not undisputed. A permanent El Niño would suppress hurricane activity in the North Atlantic less effectively than a present-day El Niño, owing to different thermodynamic effects of transitory warming.

Stronger tropical cyclones are expected to cause more mixing of the ocean and thus a stronger effect on heat transport. Anthropogenic global warming is expected to increase the frequency of intense tropical cyclones and thus may induce a Cyclonic Niño effect. Increased hurricane activity in the Central Pacific could be a consequence.
