= Girlfriends (album) =

2009 album by Girlfriends

Studio album by Girlfriends
- Released: December 19, 2009
- Recorded: Summer 2009
- Studio: Blue Box Studios (Moscow, Idaho)
- Genres: Math rock; Midwest emo; pop-punk
- Length: 27:15
- Label: Self-released
- Producers: Bart Budwig; Jerry Joiner

Girlfriends chronology
Girlfriends (2009)	Girlfriends (Reverse) (2009)

Girlfriends (Reverse) cover

Girlfriends is the debut studio album by the American musician Jerry Joiner, known professionally as Girlfriends. It was self-released on December 19, 2009. Joiner was only 17 years old at the time of the album's release, and played all the instruments on the album himself. A version of the album containing reversed versions of songs, titled Girlfriends (Reverse), was released the same day as the standard album. A music video for the song "Brobocop" was also filmed. Though he has teased new music and has been somewhat active on social media, Girlfriends is Joiner’s only studio album as of 2026.

The song "New Computers" saw unexpected viral success via TikTok in 2025, prompting Joiner to release an EP featuring alternate versions of the song.

== Critical reception ==
Professional ratings
Review scores
Source	Rating
Sputnikmusic	4/5

Gavin Majeski of Oregon Music News described Girlfriends as "a one of a kind listening experience", highlighting Joiner's ability to blend "shouted vocals and math rock riffs with synthesized electronic loops". In a review for Sputnikmusic, user rufinthefury described the album as "one of the funkiest, jazziest, and upbeat sounding records" they had heard in the indie scene in "ages", highlighting "twinkling" guitars, "clattering" drums, and "thick, bloated" synths. They described the lyrics as "rather poetic and clever despite their juvenile ideas", with "roundabout and bizarre requests for sex" on "Brobocop" and "Bernie Mac Attack", and "the fallout of a bad break up" being detailed on "Untitled #6". Overall, they found Girlfriends to be "simply a lovable and endearing record".

== Track listing ==
Girlfriends track listing
No.	Title	Length
1.	"Patrick Ewing"	1:10
2.	"Brobocop"	1:53
3.	"Yeah!? What's It Tuba!?"	2:18
4.	"Untitled #6"	3:36
5.	"New Computers"	2:10
6.	"Bernie Mac Attack"	1:52
7.	"Chex Urself B4 U Rex Urself"	3:07
8.	"Untitled #3"	2:58
9.	"The Apocalypse Made Me Brave"	3:55
10.	"Untitled #5"	2:19
11.	"End"	1:57
Total length:		27:15

Girlfriends (Reverse) track listing
No.	Title	Length
1.	"New Computers (Reverse)"	2:09
2.	"Untitled #6 (Reverse)"	3:34
3.	"Patrick Ewing (Reverse)"	2:07
4.	"Untitled #3 (B)"	3:00
5.	"Gosh Darn It (Reverse)"	3:50
6.	"Bernie Mac Attack (Reverse)"	1:53
7.	"Hmm, What's It Tuba? (Reverse)"	3:16
8.	"Untitled #5 (B)"	0:35
9.	"End (Reverse)"	1:58
Total length:		22:22

=== Notes ===
- "Gosh Darn It (Reverse)" is a reversed version of "The Apocalypse Made Me Brave".
- "Untitled #5 (b)" is only available on Bandcamp and YouTube.

== Personnel ==
- Jerry Joiner – instruments, main vocals, mixing
- Bart Budwig – recording, mixing
- Ryan Carter – guest vocals, album art
- Eric James – guest vocals
- David Plell – guest vocals
- Kyle Schmitt – guest vocals
