= Ex-Girlfriend =

Ex-Girlfriend may refer to:

- Ex-girlfriend, a former girlfriend
- "The Ex-Girlfriend", a 1991 Seinfeld TV show episode
- Ex Girlfriend (band), a female R&B/hip-hop band
- The Ex-Girlfriends, a pop group featuring Lupe Fuentes
- Ex-Girlfriends, a 2012 American romantic comedy-drama film
- Ex-Girlfriends, a 2004 album by Low Millions
- "Ex-Girlfriend" (song), a 2000 song by No Doubt
- "X-Girlfriend", a song by Mariah Carey from the 1999 album Rainbow
- "X-Girlfriend", a song by Bush from the 1994 album Sixteen Stone
- The Ex (target), also known as the Ex-Girlfriend, a mannequin gun target
- Ex-Girlfriend (brand), a brand of Levi Strauss & Co.

== See also ==
- EX (disambiguation)
- Girlfriend (disambiguation)
- eX-Girl, a Japanese pop trio
