= Girls Girls Girls =

Girls Girls Girls may refer to:

== Film ==
- Girls! Girls! Girls!, 1962 film starring Elvis Presley, named after the Coasters' song (see below)

== Music ==
=== Albums ===
- Girls! Girls! Girls! (soundtrack), soundtrack album to the 1962 film
- Girls, Girls, Girls (Mötley Crüe album) (1987)
- Girls Girls Girls (Elvis Costello album), 1989 compilation

=== Songs ===
- "Girls Girls Girls" (Fletcher song), 2021
- "Girls, Girls, Girls" (Jay-Z song), 2001
- "Girls, Girls, Girls" (Mötley Crüe song), 1987
- "Girls Girls Girls" (The Coasters song), a single by The Coasters, written by Leiber & Stoller 1961
- "Girls! Girls! Girls!", a song by Emilie Autumn from Fight Like a Girl
- "Girls! Girls! Girls!", a song by Liz Phair from Exile in Guyville
- "Girls, Girls, Girls", a single by Sailor from Trouble (1975)
- "Girls Girls Girls", a song by Chuck Jackson, written by Smokey Robinson & A. Cleveland Motown 1968
- "Girls Girls Girls", a song by Steve Lawrence, written by Mann & Greenfield 1960
- "Girls, Girls, Girls", a song by South Korean boy band Shinee, from the album Dream Girl – The Misconceptions of You
