= Tukulti-Ninurta =

Tukulti-Ninurta may refer to:

- Tukulti-Ninurta I (1243-1207 BC), King of Assyria
- Tukulti-Ninurta II (891-884 BC), King of Assyria, son of Adad-nirari II
- Ninurta-apal-Ekur (c. 1192-1180 BC), King of Assyria as an usurper, and descendant of Adad-nirari I
- Ninurta-tukulti-Ashur, King of Assyria in 1133 BC. Son of Ashur-dan I
- Tukulti-Ninurta Epic, Assyrian epic about Kashtiliash IV and Tukulti-Ninurta I
- Ninurta, in Sumerian and Akkadian mythology was the god of Nippur, a solar deity
