= Nina =

Nina may refer to:

- Nina (name), a feminine given name and surname

== Acronyms ==
- National Iraqi News Agency, a news service in Iraq
- Norwegian Institute for Nature Research, on the campus of Norwegian University of Science and Technology
- No income, no asset, a mortgage lending concept
- "No Irish need apply", an anti-Irish racism phrase found in some 19th-century employment ads in the United States

== Geography ==
- Nina, Estonia, a village in Alatskivi Parish, Tartu County, Estonia
- Nina, Mozambique, a village in the Ancuabe District of Cabo Delgado Province in northern Mozambique

=== United States ===
- Nina, Texas, a census-designated place (CDP) in Starr County, Texas
- Nina Station, Louisiana, an unincorporated community in St. Martin Parish, Louisiana
- Ninaview, Colorado, an unincorporated area in Bent County, Colorado

== Arts, entertainment, and media ==
=== Films ===
- Nina (1956 film), a West German film
- Nina (1959 film), a French film
- Nina (2004 film), a Brazilian film
- Nina (2016 film), an American film
- Nina (2017 film), a Slovak film
- Nina (2024 film), a Spanish film

=== Television ===
- Nina (TV series), a 2015–2021 French television series
- "Nina", an episode of the TV series Pocoyo

=== Music ===
==== Groups ====
- NiNa, a multinational J-pop group
- Nina & Frederik, a Danish singing duo of the 1950s and 1960s
- Nina Sky, an American singing duo

==== Classical music ====
- Nina (Dalayrac), a 1786 opera by Nicolas Dalayrac
- Nina (opera), a 1790 opera by Giovanni Paisiello
- "Tre giorni son che Nina" (often shortened to just "Nina"), an 18th-century song variously attributed to Vincenzo Ciampi or Pergolesi

==== Albums ====
- Nina (Nina album), a 2006 album by Filipina singer Nina Girado
- Nina (Xiu Xiu album), a 2013 album by American avant-garde group Xiu Xiu
- Nina (Nina Badrić album), a 2000 album by Croatian singer Nina Badrić

==== Songs ====
- "Nina", by Jean-Michel Blais from the 2022 album Aubades
- "Nina", by Noël Coward from the 1945 revue Sigh No More
- "Nina" (Ed Sheeran song), 2014
- "Nina" (Maaya Sakamoto song), 2024
- "Draumur um Nínu" (A Dream about Nína) or simply "Nina", Iceland's 1991 Eurovision Song Contest entry
- "Nina + Field of Cops", by Cameron Winter from the 2024 album Heavy Metal

=== Other arts, entertainments, and media ===
- Nina (TV series), a French television comedy broadcast on French 2
- "Nina and the Neurons", a Scottish programme shown on the CBeebies channel
- Nina, a 1949 play by André Roussin
- Nina, a character introduced in Season 4 of the Spanish children's show Pocoyo

== People with the mononym ==
- Nina (musician), German synthwave electronic singer-songwriter based in London
- Nina (Spanish singer), Spanish singer, vocal coach and actress
- Nina Girado, Filipino singer
- Nina Gerhard, German singer
- Nina Kreutzmann Jørgensen, Greenlandic singer
- Nina Makino, American singer
- Nina van Pallandt (born 1932), Danish singer and actress (also of the Nina & Frederik vocal duo)
- Saint Nino (anglicized to Nina), an Eastern-orthodox saint

== Other uses ==
- Nina Printing House, a secret underground printing house in Baku, Russia, 1901–1906
- Nina Tower, a skyscraper in Hong Kong
- BLS RABe 525 train in Switzerland, also known as Nina
- Castro (clothing), an Israeli garment company originally named Nina
- Typhoon Nina (disambiguation)
- 779 Nina, an asteroid

== See also ==
- Nela (name)
- Al Hirschfeld, American caricaturist who embedded "NINA", the name of his daughter, in most of his drawings, now used to describe messages hidden within crossword puzzles
- Niña (ship), the ship used by Christopher Columbus on his 1492 voyage
- Niña (disambiguation)
- Nena (disambiguation)
- Neena (disambiguation)
