= Nena (disambiguation) =

Nena (born Gabriele Susanne Kerner, 1960) is a German singer.

Nena may also refer to:

- Nena (band), the band organized by the singer, active from 1982 until 1987
  - Nena (album), the debut album of the band.
- Nena (Portuguese singer), a Portuguese singer with the same name

== Songs ==
- "Nena" (song), by Miguel Bosé
- "Nena", the B-side for "Suavecito", by Malo

== Other ==
- Nena (footballer, born 1923), Olavo Rodrigues Barbosa, Brazilian footballer
- Nena (footballer, born 1981), Ygor da Silva, Brazilian-born and Equatoguinean footballer
- Nena people, an ethnic group in Tanzania
- Nena of Nata and Nena, Aztec mythical figure a.k.a. Citlalicue
- Nena (film), a 2014 German-Dutch co-production

== Acronym ==
- Nena (supercontinent), derived from Northern Europe and North America
- National Emergency Number Association, USA
- Nokomis East Neighborhood Association, in Minneapolis
- Northeastern Neo-Aramaic language group

== People ==
- Nena (name)

== See also ==
- Nina (disambiguation)
