= The Girls (1960s band) =

American band

The Girls were an American all-female band from Los Angeles, California, United States. They initially called themselves The Sandoval Sisters and The Moonmaids before settling on The Girls in 1965, when they signed a recording contract with Capitol Records. The members were sisters: Rosemary (lead guitar), Diane (rhythm guitar), Sylvia (bass), and Margaret (drums and lead vocals) Sandoval. They released two singles with Capitol, including a version of the biker song "Chico's Girl", written by Barry Mann and Cynthia Weil. The group toured the Far East, which included performing for the troops in Vietnam.

The four girls first recorded as 'The Four Queens' on Teron Records : "A Cinder In My Eye" / "The Boy Next Door" (1964).

"Chico's Girl" was included on the 2009 compilation album, The Shangri-Las & The '60s Girl Group Garage Sound.

== See also ==
- List of all-women bands
