= Niño Jesús =

Coordinates: 40°24′42″N 3°40′26″W

- Neighborhood of Madrid
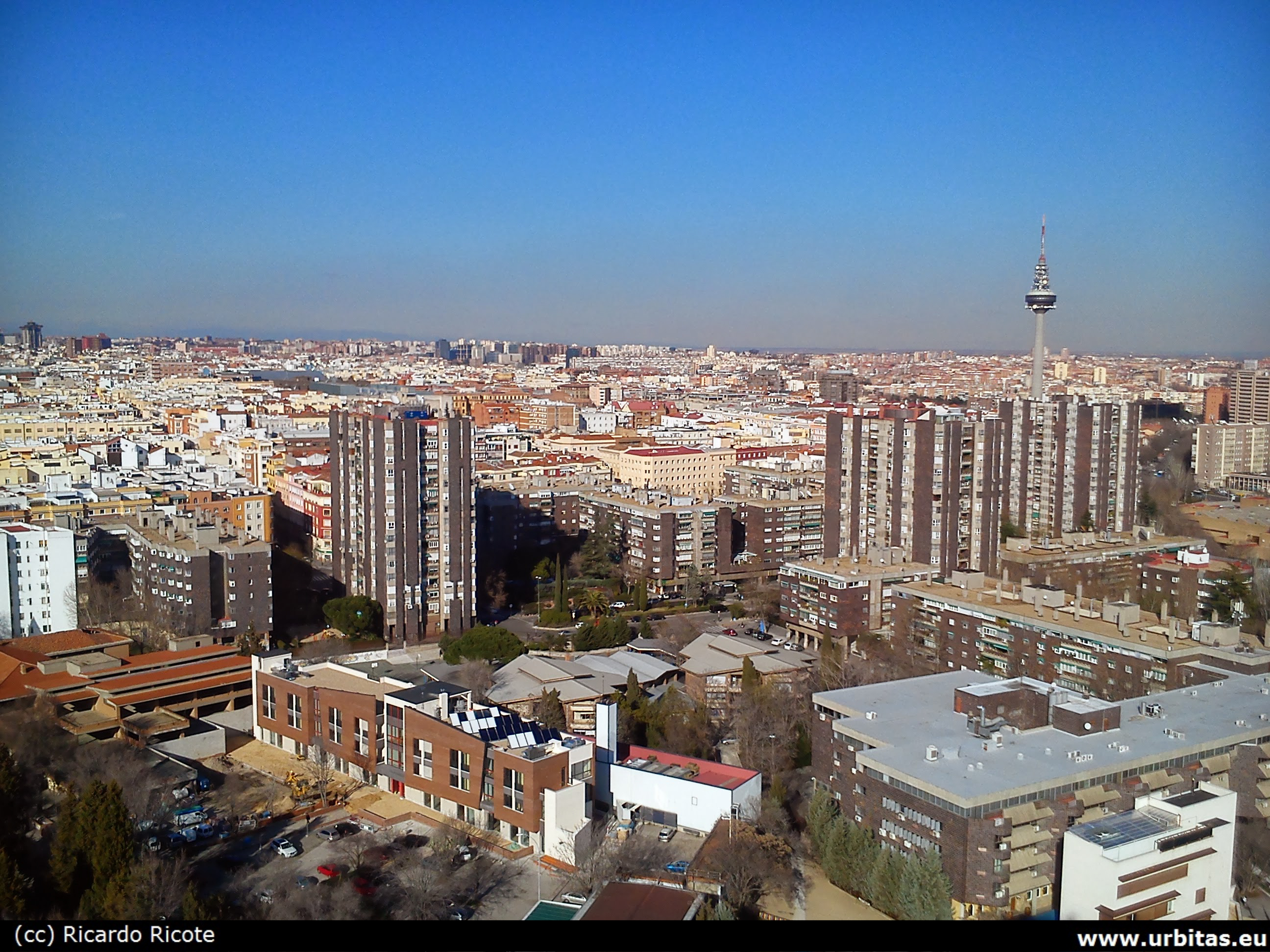
- Country: Spain
- Autonomous community: Madrid
- Municipality: Madrid
- District: Retiro

Area
  - Total: 0.643202 km^{2} (0.248342 sq mi)

Niño Jesús is an administrative neighborhood (barrio) of Madrid belonging to the district of Retiro. It is 0.643202 km² in size.
