= Owari Tokugawa family =

Branch of the Tokugawa family

Tokugawa 徳川 (尾張)
- Maruni-mitsubaaoi ("Circle Around Three Hollyhock Leaves"), the mon of the Owari branch of Tokugawa clan
- Home province: Owari
- Parent house: Tokugawa clan
- Titles: Daimyō
- Founder: Tokugawa Yoshinao
- Final ruler: Tokugawa Munechika
- Current head: Yoshitaka Tokugawa
- Founding year: 1610
- Cadet branches: Takasu-Matsudaira family (高須松平家)

The Owari Tokugawa family (尾張徳川家, Owari Tokugawa-ke) is a branch of the Tokugawa clan, and it is the seniormost house of the Gosanke ("three honourable houses of the Tokugawa").

== History ==
The family was originally founded by Tokugawa Yoshinao, the ninth son of Tokugawa Ieyasu. Yoshinao was originally named Matsudaira Yoshitoshi (松平義利); it was not until 1621 that he changed his name to Yoshinao, and later gained the surname Tokugawa in 1636; the family, along with Kishu-Tokugawa family (descendants of Tokugawa Yorinobu, Yoshinao's half-brother), had succession right to the shōgun once the latter died without heir. For over 250 years, the Owari family ruled Owari Domain, the area surrounding present day Nagoya, Aichi Prefecture, using Nagoya Castle as its main base. Other residences were the Ōzone Oshitayashiki, the Aoi Oshitayashiki (both in the Higashi ward of the town), as well as the New Palace ((新御殿 Shin Goten) in Horibata-chō, Nagoya. The treasures of the Owari are kept in the Tokugawa Art Museum in Nagoya.

Despite having seniority of the Tokugawa clan, there were no shōguns that came from the Owari-Tokugawa family throughout the Edo period. Tokugawa Muneharu, the 7th head of Owari-Tokugawa family, was forced to retire in 1739 because of his policy dispute with Tokugawa Yoshimune; Muneharu was then replaced by his cousin Munekatsu. The main patrilineal descent of Yoshinao, however, became extinct in 1800 with the death of the 9th family head, Tokugawa Munechika, who outlived his two only sons and four heirs he adopted. As such, the Owari-Tokugawa family had since been kept in existence through repeated adoptions from the two remaining houses, from Kishu and Mito-Tokugawa family. After the Meiji Restoration, in 1880, Tokugawa Yoshikatsu appointed his son-in-law, Yoshiakira, as his heir (mukoyōshi, "adopted son-in-law"); Yoshiakira was later recognized as the kazoku and became a marquis in 1884. The mukoyōshi adoption of the Owari-Tokugawa happened again twice, once to Yoshichika in 1908 and the other to Yoshinobu in 1955; Yoshinobu was born a member of the Hotta clan instead of the Tokugawa.

Kenchū-ji is a Jōdo-shū Buddhist temple in Tsutsui, Higashi-ku, Nagoya. Starting in the Edo period it became the Bodaiji of the family, with numerous heads of the clan cremated there.

The family branch was the largest owner of land due to its senior position within the Shogunate. For an overview see list of Owari Tokugawa residences.

== Family tree ==
adoption
(1543–1616); Ieyasu
(1601–1650); Yoshinao^{(1)}	(1602–1671); Yorinobu	(1603–1661); Yorifusa
(1625–1700); Mitsutomo^{(2)}	(1627–1705); Mitsusada	(1622–1695); Matsudaira; Yorishige
(1652–1699); Tsunanari^{(3)}	(1678–1728); Matsudaira Tomoaki	(1684–1751); Yoshimune	(1661–1687); Matsudaira; Yoritoshi
(1689–1713); Yoshimichi^{(4)}	(1692–1731); Tsugutomo^{(6)}	(1696–1764); Muneharu^{(7)}	(1705–1761); Munekatsu^{(8)}	(1721–1765); Munetada	(1680–1735); Matsudaira; Yoritoyo
(1700–1728); Kujō Yukinori	(1706–1757); Senhime	(1711–1713); Gorōta^{(5)}	(1733–1800); Munechika^{(9)}	(1751–1827); Harusada	(1705–1730); Munetaka
(1727–1754); Nijō Munemoto	(1773–1841); Ienari	(1776–1793); Harukuni	(1779–1848); Narimasa	(1728–1766); Munemoto
(1754–1826); Nijō Harutaka	(1793–1850); Naritomo^{(10)}	(1751–1805); Harumori
(1819–1839); Nariharu^{(11)}	(1773–1816); Harutoshi	(1776–1832); Matsudaira; Yoshinari
(1804–1826); Nijō Suiko	(1798–1864); Nabeshima Naotomo	(1810–1845); Naritaka^{(12)}	(1798–1842); Matsudaira Yorihiro	(1800–1862); Matsudaira; Yoshitatsu
(1836–1849); Yoshitsugu^{(13)}
(1826–1891); Nabeshima Naotada	(1815–1871); Nabeshima Naomasa	(1830–1886); Tatsuko	(1828–1890); Matsudaira Yoshinaga	(1834–1903); Matsudaira Yoritoshi	(1824–1883); Yoshikatsu^{(14)(17)}
(1857–1922); Nabeshima Teruko	(1858–1910); Nabeshima Naotō	(1863–1908); Yoshiakira^{(18)}	(1869–1924); Yoshiko	(1831–1884); Mochinaga^{(15)}
(1887–1951); Hotta Masatsune	(1886–1976); Tokugawa Yoshichika^{(19)}	(1892–1980); Yoneko	(1858–1875); Yoshinori^{(16)}
(1911–1992); Yoshitomo^{(20)}
(1933–2005); Yoshinobu^{(21)}	(b. 1936); Michiko
(b. 1961); Yoshitaka^{(22)}

== Gallery ==
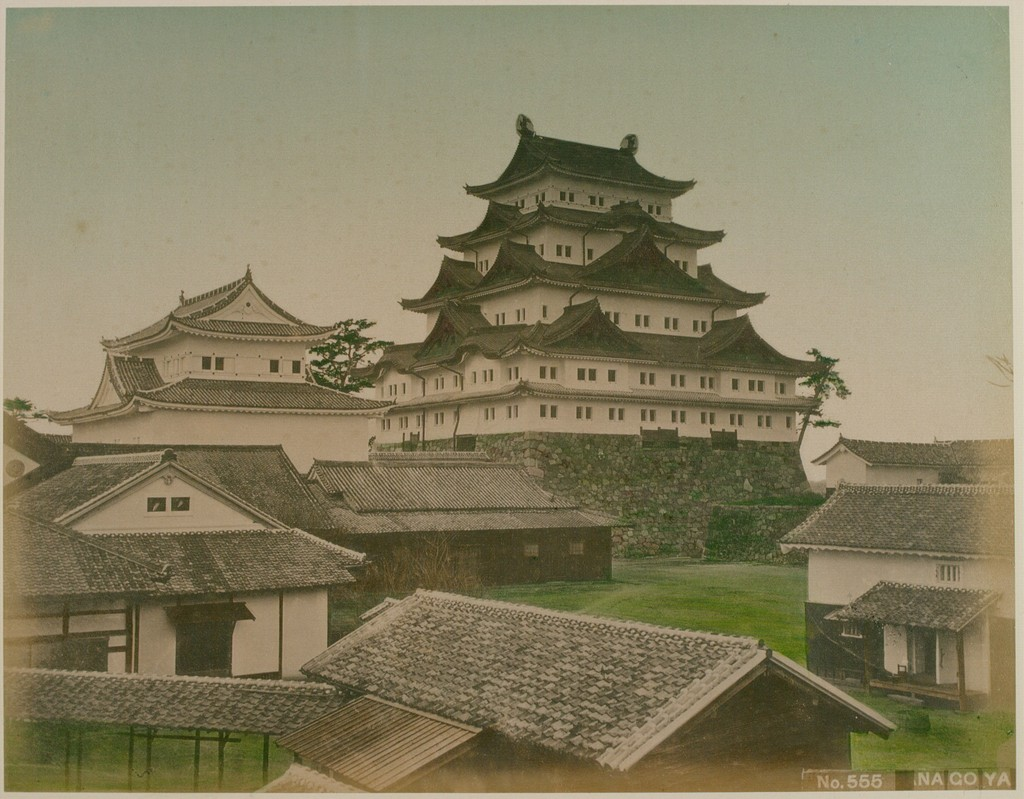
Nagoya Castle for the Owari-Tokugawa during the Edo period

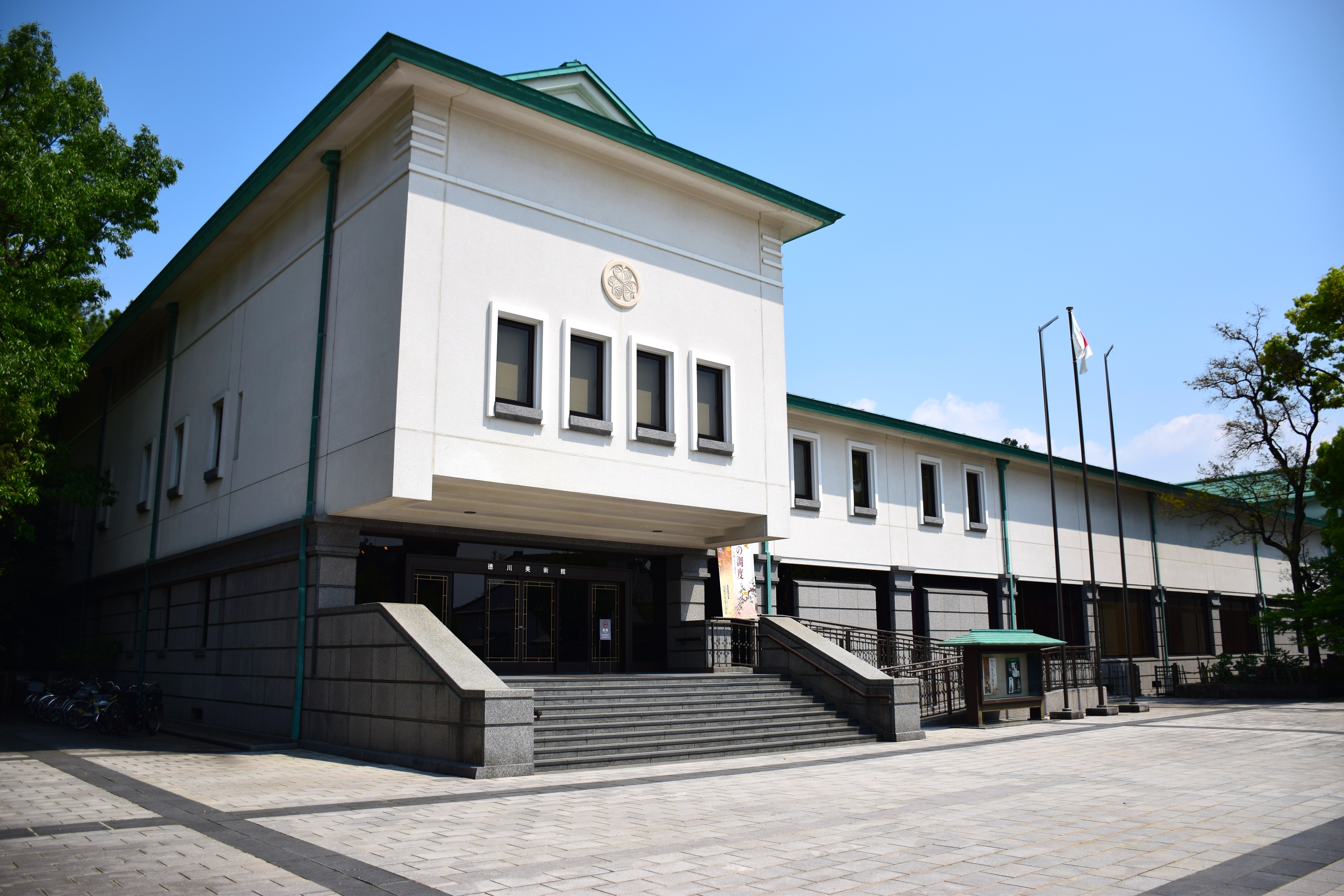
The treasures of the Owari are kept in the Tokugawa Art Museum, Nagoya

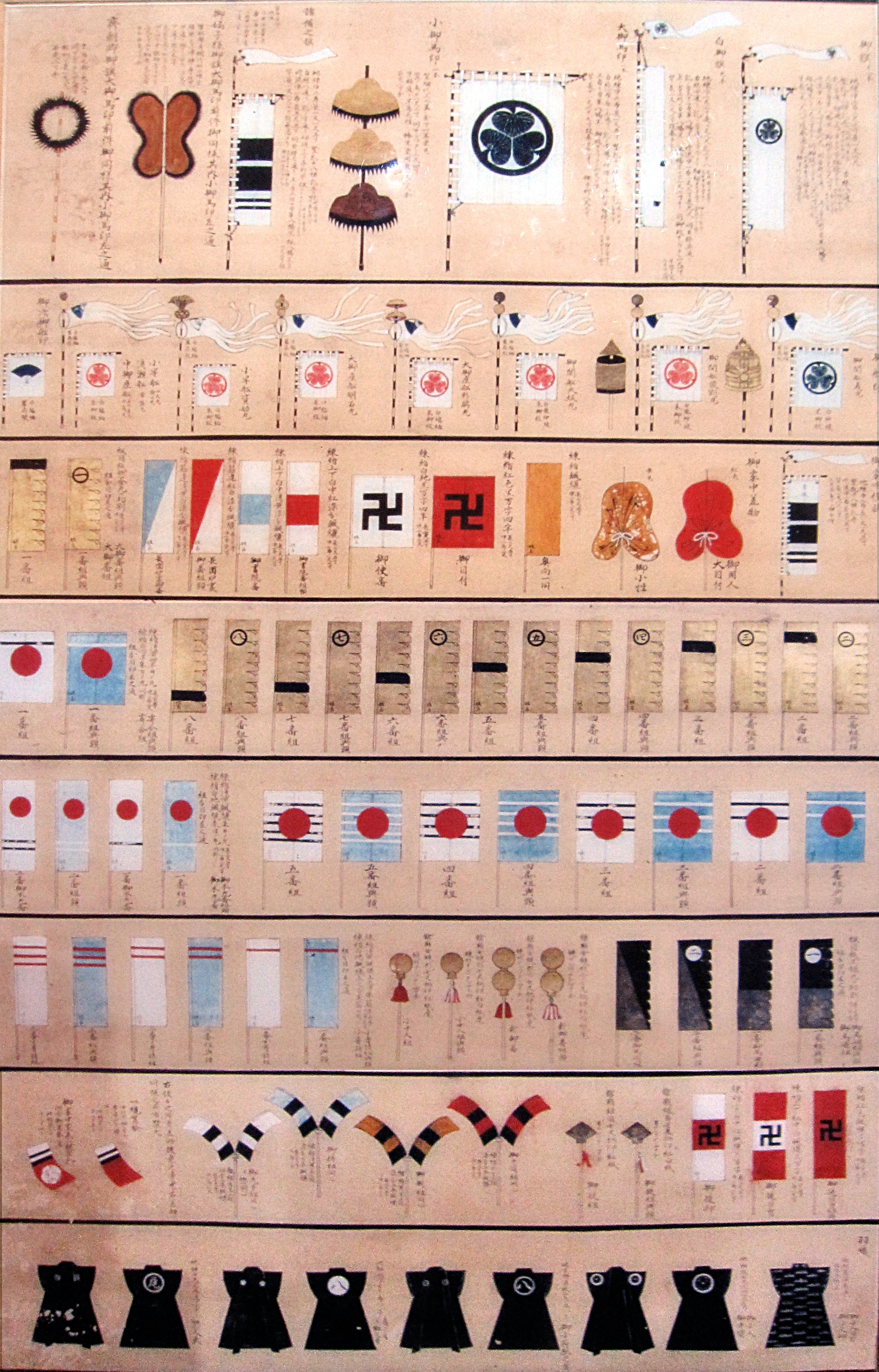
Banners of the Owari-Tokugawa
