= Gosanke =

Direct descendants of Tokugawa Ieyasu's three sons

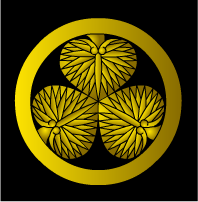
Maru-ni-mitsuba'aoi ("Circle Around Three Hollyhock Leaves"), the Tokugawa clan's crest (mon)

The Tokugawa Go-san-ke (徳川御三家, "the Three Houses of the Tokugawa"), also called simply Go-san-ke (御三家, "the Noble Three Houses"), or even San-ke (三家, "the three houses"), were the most noble three branches of the Tokugawa clan of Japan: Owari, Kii, and Mito, all of which were descended from clan founder Tokugawa Ieyasu's three youngest sons, Yoshinao, Yorinobu, and Yorifusa, and were allowed to provide a shōgun in case of need. In the Edo period the term gosanke could also refer to various other combinations of Tokugawa houses, including (1) the shogunal, Owari and Kii houses and (2) the Owari, Kii, and Suruga houses (all with the court position of dainagon).

Later, Gosanke were deprived of their role to provide a shōgun by three other branches that are closer to the shogunal house: the Gosankyō.

Even after the fall of the Tokugawa shogunate and the abolition of the Edo-period system of administrative domains (han) the three houses continued to exist in some form, as they do into the 21st century.

== History ==
After he established his shogunate, Ieyasu proceeded to put members of his family in key positions. Ninth son Yoshinao was nominated daimyō of Nagoya (Owari Province), tenth son Yorinobu daimyō of Wakayama (Kii Province) and eleventh son Yorifusa daimyō of Mito (Hitachi Province). From this allocation of fiefs came the names of the houses they founded, officially called Owari House of Tokugawa (尾張徳川家, Owari Tokugawa-ke), Kii House of Tokugawa (紀伊徳川家, Kii Tokugawa-ke), and Mito House of Tokugawa (水戸徳川家, Mito Tokugawa-ke)). Ieyasu gave them the right to supply a shōgun in order to ensure the presence of successors to the Tokugawa shogunate in case the main line should become extinct. This occurred twice during the Edo period: when the seventh shōgun died heirless in 1716, and when the thirteenth shōgun died heirless in 1858.

The three houses had the highest rank among the shinpan, the daimyōs who were relatives of the shōgun. After the Meiji Restoration, under the kazoku system, the heads of the three houses became marquesses. In 1929 the head of the Mito House was elevated from marquess to duke.

=== Owari branch ===
The senior one was the Owari branch. The first of this line was Tokugawa Yoshinao, ninth son of Ieyasu. He and his heirs were daimyōs of the Owari Domain (Owari Han), with its headquarters at Nagoya Castle. The fief had a rating of 619,500 koku, a koku being the quantity of rice necessary to feed one person for a year (about 180 liters), and was the largest of the three. Before the abolition of the shogunate and of the han system, the house was headed successively by 17 men. Its seniority notwithstanding, the Owari were the only one not to provide a shōgun.

=== Kii branch ===
Second in seniority was Kii or Kishū House. The founder was Tokugawa Yorinobu, the tenth son of Ieyasu. Yorinobu was daimyō of the Kishū Han with its castle at Wakayama and a rating of 555,000 koku. He entered Wakayama in 1619 when the previous daimyō was transferred. Fourteen members of the Tokugawa clan headed the fief during the Edo Period. It was the only family to directly produce successors to the shōgun, once in 1716 with Tokugawa Yoshimune and again in 1858 with Tokugawa Iemochi.

The fifth Tokugawa daimyō of Kii was Yoshimune, who later became shōgun and appointed a relative to head the Kii Han. Yoshimune established three new houses, the gosankyō, installing two sons and a grandson as their heads. The gosanke provided the model for the gosankyō. However, while Yoshimune granted lands to the gosankyō, the lands were not consolidated into coherent han, but instead were scattered in various places; the total holdings were also smaller than those of the gosanke. Eventually, one of the gosankyō houses, the Hitotsubashi house, produced two shoguns, once in 1787 (Tokugawa Ienari) and again in 1866 (Tokugawa Yoshinobu).

=== Mito branch ===
Third in seniority among the Gosanke was the Mito branch. Its founder was Tokugawa Yorifusa, the eleventh son of Ieyasu. Their fief was the Mito Han in Hitachi Province, with its castle in Mito and lands rated initially at 250,000 koku, and later (1710) at 350,000. Eleven men headed the house, including Tokugawa (Mito) Mitsukuni. The Mito House was not allowed to provide a shōgun, but only his vice. It did manage however to produce one when one of its sons, Tokugawa Yoshinobu, was adopted by the Hitotsubashi (one of the Kii House's three Gosankyō) in 1848 and became the last shōgun as a member of that house.

== Genealogy of the Gosanke heads ==
=== Owari branch ===
1. Yoshinao
2. Mitsutomo
3. Tsunanari
4. Yoshimichi
5. Gorōta
6. Tsugutomo
7. Muneharu
8. Munekatsu
9. Munechika
10. Naritomo
11. Nariharu
12. Naritaka
13. Yoshitsugu
14. Yoshikumi
15. Mochinaga
16. Yoshinori
17. Yoshikatsu
18. Yoshiakira
19. Yoshichika
20. Yoshitomo
21. Yoshinobu
22. Yoshitaka

The 22nd head of the Owari House is Mr. Yoshitaka Tokugawa (徳川 義崇, Tokugawa Yoshitaka) (born 1961), who in 2005 succeeded his late father, becoming director of the Tokugawa Art Museum in Nagoya. A Tokyo resident, he commutes to Nagoya during weekends. His main activities are the museum and realty management.

=== Kii branch ===
1. Tokugawa Yorinobu (1601–1671, r. 1619–1667)
2. Mitsusada (1626–1705, r. 1667–1698)
3. Tsunanori (1665–1705, r. 1698–1705)
4. Yorimoto (1680–1705, r. 1705)
5. Yoshimune (1684–1751, r. 1705–1716) (later became shōgun with the same name)
6. Munenao (1682–1757, r. 1716–1757)
7. Munemasa (1720–1765, r. 1757–1765)
8. Shigenori (1746–1829, r. 1765–1775)
9. Harusada (1728–1789, r. 1775–1789)
10. Harutomi (1771–1852, r. 1789–1832)
11. Nariyuki (1801–1846, r. 1832–1846)
12. Narikatsu (1820–1849, r. 1846–1849)
13. Yoshitomi (1846–1866, r. 1849–1858) (later became shōgun with the name Iemochi)
14. Mochitsugu (1844–1906, r. 1858–1869)
15. Yorimichi (1872-1925, r. 1869-1925)
16. Yorisada (1892-1954, r. 1925-1954)
17. Yoriaki (1917-1958, r. 1954-1958)
18. Gō (1924-unknown, r. 1958-1965)
19. Kotoko (b.1956, r. 1965-still)

The 19th head of the Kii House is Ms. Kotoko Tokugawa (徳川 宜子, Tokugawa Kotoko) (born in 1956). Although she is not married and has no children, she was chosen as head of the clan because there were no other direct descendants. An architect, she owns and operates her own construction company in Ginza, Tokyo. Unlike the other two, the Kii House does not have a museum of its own, and has given its properties of historical value to museums, such as the Wakayama Prefectural Museum. Effectively extinct

=== Mito branch ===
1. Yorifusa
2. Mitsukuni
3. Tsunaeda
4. Munetaka
5. Munemoto
6. Harumori
7. Harutoshi
8. Narinobu
9. Nariaki
10. Yoshiatsu
11. Akitake
12. Atsuyoshi
13. Kuniyuki
14. Kuninari
15. Narimasa

The 15th head of the Mito House is Mr. Narimasa Tokugawa (徳川斉正, Tokugawa Narimasa) (born in 1958). From July 2009 he is also the director of Mito's Shōkōkan Tokugawa Museum (彰考館徳川博物館). He presently works for Tokio Marine & Nichido Fire Insurance Co., Ltd. A Tokyo resident, he commutes to Mito on weekends.

== Other uses of the term ==
In modern Japanese, the word gosanke is used to refer to "the strongest three" or "the most famous three" in various contexts. For example, the Imperial Hotel, Hotel Okura, and Hotel New Otani Tokyo are often referred to as one of the three great hotels (御三家, gosanke) of Tokyo. The Otani Hotel was built in the Kioi district of Tokyo, where the Tokyo residence of the Kii House was located. The "8-bit gosanke", similarly to the "1977 trinity" in America, refers to the leading Japanese machines in the early home computing era.

In pop culture, the term gosanke is also used among Japanese Pokémon fans to refer to the three starter Pokémon offered at the start of every mainline game installment in the series. The term is also used among Korean and Chinese-speaking Pokémon fans.
