= Aomatsuba Incident =

1868 incident at Nagoya Castle, Japan

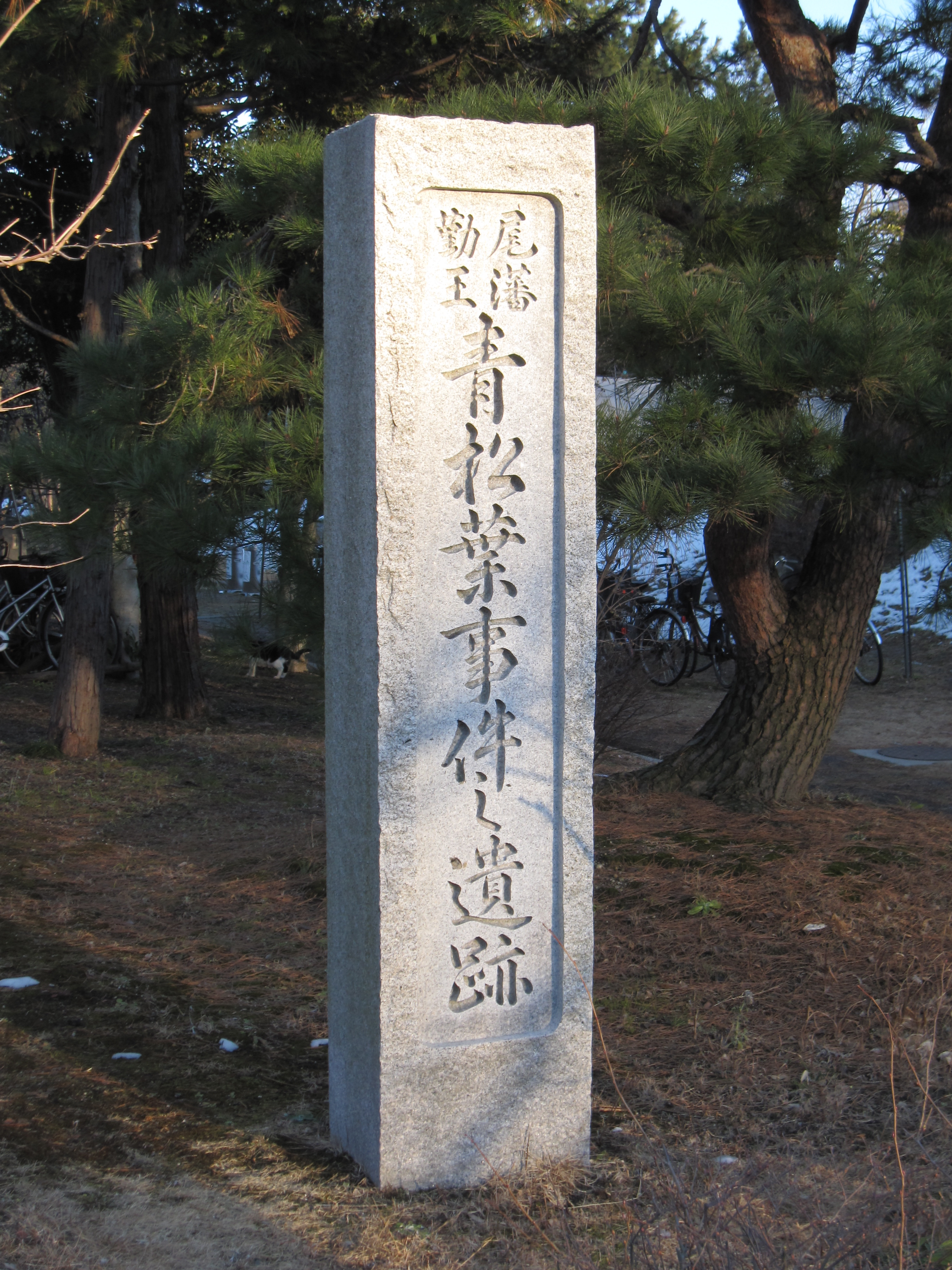
Aomatsuba Incident memorial stele

The Aomatsuba Incident (青松葉事件, Aomatsuba jiken) was a political purge that took place from February 13 to 18, 1868 in Nagoya Castle, central Japan, during the tumultuous final months of the Tokugawa shogunate as the Meiji Restoration unfolded across the country.

The Aomatsuba Incident was the oppression of the Sabaku party (sabaku ha) - supporters of the Tokugawa shogunate - that occurred in the Owari Domain from February 13 to 18, 1868. This crackdown took place as domains throughout Japan were choosing sides between the declining shogunate and the emerging imperial government. Immediately after returning to the Owari domain from Kyoto, Tokugawa Yoshikatsu (徳川義勝), the 14th lord of the domain, received an imperial order with charges of "adultery" (姦徒誅鋤) against pro-shogunate elements within his domain. The accused subjects ranged from senior vassals to general feudal retainers, with 14 decapitations and 20 other punishments. There are various theories about the background of the imperial decree.

The name of the incident is derived from the Aomatsuba residence, which was the house of Watanabe Shinzaemon, one of the first to be executed. The residence was located just outside of Nagoya Castle's Soto-bori outer moat.

== The process of the outbreak ==
The Owari-Tokugawa family (尾張), the Kishu Tokugawa family (紀州), and the Mito-Tokugawa family (水戸), the three privileged branches of the Tokugawa family which were called Gosanke (御三家), were called Otsukegaro 【御付家老】. Otsukegaro was simply the Ometsuke【大目付】 of the lord of the domain dispatched from the Shogun (将軍) family, and in Owari, the family of Naruse Hayato and the Takekoshi Hyobu Shoyu (竹腰兵部少輔) family were well known for their chigyo (知行). The power was strong from the family that the load had to pay attention to, and the domain was naturally divided into the Naruse faction and the Takekoshi faction. Among them, it was the Takekoshi group who continued to take closer positions to the bakufu government, and in the old days, Tokugawa Muneharu (徳川宗春), the seventh lord, who was rebellious to the bakufu, was forced to retire. At the end of the Edo period, the domain was divided into 'Kintetsu Gumi (金鉄組),' which advocated the Sonno-joi policy (尊皇攘夷) (reverence for the emperor and the expulsion of barbarians), and 'Fuigo party,' which was a careless position, and the Naruse family was close to the Fuigo party.

== Incident ==
In the first place, the Owari Tokugawa family was the family-style of the retired emperor's family from the time of the domain Tokugawa Yoshinao (徳川義直), and since there was a rebel against the Tokugawa Shogunate family (徳川将軍家) once again, Tokugawa Yoshikatsu (徳川義勝), who became the 14th lord of the domain, also took the position of Sonno Joi (the descent of the emperor and expelling the barbarians), and especially the Takekoshi family in advance of the reform of the domain administration since the arrival of Matthew C. Perry. They often opposed the Fuego party. When Yoshikatsu retired due to the suppression of Tairo (大老)Ii Naosuke (井伊直弼), the Kintetsu Gumi fell, and Takekoshi Hyobu shoyu took over the domain administration under the new lord Mochinaga (茂徳), and after the Sakuradamon Incident (桜田門外ノ変), Takekoshi Hyobu Shoyu fell out, and Yoshikatsu went to the front of the domain while retiring, and went to the capital frequently with the Kintetsu Gumi to enter the government. Meanwhile, Mochinaga retired and Yoshikatsu's son, Yoshinobu (慶喜), became the lord of the domain, and Fuigo party was shelved.

After Taisei Hokan, the Bakufu army was defeated in the Battle of Toba–Fushimi (鳥羽伏見ノ戦い) on January 27 and 29, 1868. When the news arrived in Nagoya, the conflict between the Kintetsu Gumi who insisted on the dispatch of troops and the Fuigo party, which was cautious about the dispatch of troops, deepened the conflict. At that time Yoshikatsu, who was in Kyoto, heard the situation from Yoshida Tomoyuki in the Owari domain who was an Inspector(監察), who came to Kyoto on the way in as the form of Messaging Mamiya Masakazu who was castle owner.

The government army, who won the battle of Toba Fushimi, appointed imperial Prince Ninna Ji no Miya （Komatsu-no-miya Akihito） to the position of Seii Taishogun [literally, "great general who suppressed the barbarians"] on January 28, and issued an order to hunt down and kill Yoshinobu on January 31. However, in the east of Nagoya, there were many Bakufu Fudai daimyō (Japanese feudal government headed by a Shogun), and Yoshinobu's counterattack was also considered, making him uneasy about passing such an Army.

On February 8, the Imperial Court summoned Yoshikatsu and ordered the return of the imperial court to clean the supporters of the Sabaku party in the Owari domain, which was the key point of transportation, to persuade neighboring in Owari domain feudal lords to come to the imperial court.

Yoshikatsu was a member of the Imperial family from an early time, but it was in a position to consider the bakufu (as the head of the Tokugawa gosanke (the three privileged families of the Tokugawa clan), and it was natural that there was sabaku party in the domain, however, it was not possible to rebel against imperial order. At the end of the distress, he decided to purge the sabaku party (supporters of the Shogunate), and that Matsudaira Shungaku, "Tencho was a good vassal. Bakufu was his father and son. In the time of national calamity, if the father and the son's father are captured, They shall stand up for the righteousness of their servants" he said.

Yoshikatsu left Kyoto on the order of imperial command, and stayed at Owari-ichinomiya on 12 February, and went to Nagoya Castle on the 13th. On the same day, Chief retainer Shinzaemon Watanabe Aritsuna (渡辺在綱) was arrested. He was executed by beheading on 16 February. Besides, 13 persons including Ooban Gashira (大番頭), Sakakibara Kageyu (榊原勘解由), Oobangashira, Ishikawa Kuranosuke (石川内蔵充) were arrested and beheaded without a public explanation of the reasons.

Yoshikatsu left the incident as an internal conflict in the Owari domain and tried to forbid speaking feudal retainer of the domain. Also, for the reason of 'invite the relatives of emperor to the emperor,' he confirmed to the various domains of countries (Whether Imperial courtside or betray the Imperial Court ) in six provinces in the Tomi, Kai, Suruga, Shinano, Mino, Shimotsuke on April 21.

Three chief commissioners of Owari branch under ruling Tokugawa clan were enacted when entering the Ninomaru gate in Nagoya Castle. At the end of Taishō era in 1926, The stele was erected at the enactment point. The execution point is still uncertain, however, it has been thought to occur about 100 meters south from the present point of the stele. The stele was reerected after the enactment point had got lost.

== Cause of the incident ==
At the time of the first conquest of the Choshu domain, Yoshikatsu was appointed to the post of chief of the expedition in the battle of it. The war was not fought, and the Choshu domain apologized, and three of the senior statesmen of Choshu domain and 11 retainers did Seppuku. After that, the government decided to Expedition, and organized two times. The shame of the Choshu domain, the second insult, and this grudge. Besides, it was the same as the Choshu clan, which was beheaded in the incident of 11 senior vassals and 11 Hanshi (retainers), who happened to committed Seppuku at the time of the first conquest. However, Yoshikatsu was openly opposed to the second conquest of Choshu, and it was not possible to explain how the Choshu domain, which had not been appointed to the three key posts, moved the imperial court only after the restoration.

== See also ==
- Sakuradamon Incident (1860)
- Namamugi Incident
