= Owari =

Owari may refer to:

- The Owari Mandarin orange, a widely cultivated fruit of Japanese origin
- Additional Japan-related topics:
  - Owari House, a branch family of the Tokugawa clan that ruled Japan during the Edo era
  - Owari Province, a former region in Japan
  - Owari Domain, a feudal domain of Japan in the Edo period
  - Owari clan, an ancient Japanese clan
- Owari or oware, a token-moving game
