= Takasu Domain =

Coordinates: 35°13′25″N 136°37′54″E

Takasu Domain 高須藩
- Domain of Japan
- 1600–1628; 1640–1691; 1700–1870
- Capital: Takasu jin'ya
  - Type: Daimyō
- Historical era: Edo period
  - Established: 1600; 426 years ago
  - Disestablished: 1870; 156 years ago
Preceded by	Succeeded by
Mino Province	Nagoya Domain
- Today part of: Gifu Prefecture

The Takasu Domain (高須藩, Takasu-han) was a Japanese domain located in Mino Province (present-day Kaizu, Gifu). For most of its history, it was ruled by the Takasu-Matsudaira, a branch of the Tokugawa clan of Owari Domain.

Matsudaira Katamori, Matsudaira Sadaaki, Tokugawa Yoshikatsu, and Tokugawa Mochinaga, four important figures in Bakumatsu-era Japan, were the sons of Matsudaira Yoshitatsu, one of Takasu's last daimyō.

== History ==
In 1600, after the Battle of Sekigahara, Takagi Morikane was dispossessed of Takasu Castle for having sided with the pro-Toyotomi Western Army under Ishida Mitsunari. He was replaced by Tokunaga Nagamasa, one of Tokugawa Ieyasu’s generals and was assigned a fief with a kokudaka of 50,673 koku. The marked the start of Takasu Domain under the Tokugawa shogunate. His son, Tokunaga Masashige, increased the kokudaka to 53,000 koku; however, he was dispossessed in 1628 over his failure to complete the rebuilding of the walls of Osaka Castle, and the domain was suppressed.

Takasu Domain was revived in 1640 as a 22,000 koku holding for a cadet branch of the Ogasawara clan from Sekiyado Domain in Shimōsa. However, the domain suffered greatly from flood damage, and the shogunate transferred the Ogasawara to Katsuyama Domain in Echizen in 1691.

The domain was revived a third time in 1700, this time as a 30,000 koku holding for Matsudaira Yoshiyuki, the younger son of Tokugawa Mitsutomo of Owari Domain. Matsudaira Yoshiyuki was already daimyō of the 30,000 koku Takai Domain in Mino Province since 1681, and traded this territory of Takasu Domain, which then became a subsidiary to Owari Domain. The domain remained in the hands of his descendants until the Meiji restoration.

Although administered as a part of Owari Domain, the position of Takasu Domain was somewhat ambiguous, as it was authorized directly by the shogunate rather than by Owari Domain. On the other hand, its daimyō lived permanently in Edo, and administered domain affairs through appointed officials, rather than residing in the domain and was thus not subject to Sankin-kōtai.

== Bakumatsu period holdings ==
As with most domains in the han system, Takasu Domain consisted of a discontinuous territories calculated to provide the assigned kokudaka, based on periodic cadastral surveys and projected agricultural yields.

- Mino Province
  - 13 villages in Kaisai District
  - 15 villages in Ishizu District
- Shinano Province
  - 42 villages in Ina District

== List of daimyō ==
	Name	Tenure	Courtesy title	Court Rank	kokudaka
Tokunaga clan (Tozama) 1600–1646
1	Tokunaga Nagamasa (徳永寿昌)	1600-1632	Iwami-no-kami (石見守)	Junior 5th Rank, Lower Grade (従五位下)	50,673 koku
2	Tokunaga Masahige (徳永昌重)	1632–1646	Sama-no-suke (左馬介)	Junior 5th Rank, Lower Grade (従五位下)	52,000 koku
tenryō 1646–1649
Ogasawara clan (fudai) 1649–1676
1	Ogasawara Sadanobu (小笠原貞信)	1646–1676	Tosa-no-kami (土佐守)	Junior 5th Rank, Lower Grade (従五位下)	22,000 koku
tenryō 1676–1700
Matsudaira clan/Tokugawa clan (Shinpan) 1700–1870
1	Matsudaira Yoshiyuki (松平義行)	1700-1715	Settsu-no-kami (摂津守)	Junior 5th Rank, Lower Grade (従五位下)	30,000 koku
2	Matsudaira Yoshitaka (松平義孝)	1715–1732	Settsu-no-kami (摂津守)	Junior 4th Rank, Lower Grade (従四位下)	30,000 koku
3	Matsudaira Yoshiatsu (松平義淳)	1732–1739	Sakonoe-shosho (左近衛少将)	Junior 4th Rank, Lower Grade (従四位下)	30,000 koku
4	Matsudaira Yoshitoshi (松平義敏)	1739–1771	Nakatsukasa no-daiyu (中務大輔)	Junior 4th Rank, Lower Grade (従四位下)	30,000 koku
5	Matsudaira Yoshitomo (松平義柄)	1771–1777	Settsu-no-kami (摂津守); Jijū (侍従)	Junior 4th Rank, Lower Grade (従四位下)	30,000 koku
6	Matsudaita Yoshihiro (松平 義裕)	1777–1795	Settsu-no-kami (摂津守); Jijū (侍従)	Junior 4th Rank, Lower Grade (従四位下)	30,000 koku
7	Matsudaira Yoshimasa ([松平義当)	1795–1801	Danjo-hitsu (弾正大弼)	Junior 4th Rank, Lower Grade (従四位下)	30,000 koku
8	Matsudaira Yoshisue (松平義居)	1801–1804	Sakonoe-shosho (左少将)；Jijū (侍従)	Junior 4th Rank, Lower Grade (従四位下)	30,000 koku
9	Matsudaira Yoshinari (松平義和)	1804-1832	Sakonoe-shosho (左少将)	Junior 4th Rank, Lower Grade (従四位下)	30,000 koku
10	Matsudaira Yoshitatsu (松平義建)	1832–1850	Sakonoe-shosho (左少将)	Junior 4th Rank, Lower Grade (従四位下)	30,000 koku
11	Tokugawa Chikanaga (徳川茂徳)	1850-1858	Sakonoe-shosho (左少将)	Junior 4th Rank, Lower Grade (従四位下)	30,000 koku
12	Matsudaira Yoshimasa (松平義端)	1858–1860	none -	none -	30,000 koku
13	Matsudaira Yoshitake (松平義勇)	1860-1869	none -	5th Rank, (従五位)	30,000 koku
14	Matsudaira Yoshinari (松平義生)	1869 –1870	none -	none -	30,000 koku

=== Simplified genealogy ===
- Tokugawa Ieyasu, 1st Tokugawa Shōgun (1543–1616; r. 1603–1605)
  - Tokugawa Yoshinao, 1st Lord of Owari (1601–1650)
    - Tokugawa Mitsutomo, 2nd Lord of Owari (1625–1700)
      - Tokugawa Tsunanari, 3rd Lord of Owari (1652–1699)
        - II. Matsudaira Yoshitaka, 2nd Lord of Takasu (1694–1732; r. 1715–1732)
      - I. Matsudaira Yoshiyuki, 1st Lord of Takasu (1656–1715; Lord of Takasu: cr. 1700)
      - Matsudaira Tomoaki, Head of the Kawado-Kubo line (1678–1728)
        - III. Matsudaira Yoshiaki, 3rd Lord of Takasu (later Tokugawa Munekatsu, 8th Lord of Owari) (1705–1761; 3rd Lord of Takasu: 1732–1739; 8th Lord of Owari: 1739–1761)
          - IV. Matsudaira Yoshitoshi, 4th Lord of Takasu (1734–1771; r. 1739–1771)
            - V. Matsudaira Yoshitomo, 5th Lord of Takasu (1760–1793; r. 1771–1777)
            - VI. Matsudaira Yoshihiro, 6th Lord of Takasu (1762–1795; r. 1777–1795)
          - VII. Matsudaira Katsumasa, 7th Lord of Takasu (1738–1801; r. 1795–1801)
  - Tokugawa Yorinobu, 1st Lord of Kishū (1602–1671)
    - Tokugawa Mitsusada, 2nd Lord of Kishū (1627–1705)
      - Tokugawa Yoshimune, 8th Tokugawa Shōgun (1684–1751; 5th Lord of Kishū: 1705–1716; 8th Tokugawa Shōgun: 1716–1745)
        - Tokugawa Munetada, 1st Hitotsubashi-Tokugawa family head (1721–1765)
          - Tokugawa Harusada, 2nd Hitotsubashi-Tokugawa family head (1751–1827)
            - VIII. Matsudaira Yoshisue, 8th Lord of Takasu (1785–1804; r. 1801–1804)
  - Tokugawa Yorifusa, 1st Lord of Mito (1603–1661)
    - Matsudaira Yorishige, 1st Lord of Takamatsu (1622–1695)
      - Matsudaira Yoriyuki (1661–1687)
        - Matsudaira Yoritoyo, 3rd Lord of Takamatsu (1680–1735)
          - Tokugawa Munetaka, 4th Lord of Mito (1705–1730)
            - Tokugawa Munemoto, 5th Lord of Mito (1728–1766)
              - Tokugawa Harumori, 6th Lord of Mito (1751–1805)
                - IX. Matsudaira Yoshinari, 9th Lord of Takasu (1776–1832; r. 1804–1832)
                  - X. Matsudaira Yoshitatsu, 10th Lord of Takasu (1800–1862; r. 1832–1850)
                    - XI. Matsudaira Yoshichika, 11th Lord of Takasu (later Tokugawa Mochinaga, 10th Hitotsubashi-Tokugawa family head) (1831–1884; r. 1850–1858)
                      - XII. Matsudaira Yoshimasa, 12th Lord of Takasu (1858–1860; r. 1858–1860)
                    - XIII. Matsudaira Yoshitake, 13th Lord of Takasu (1859–1891; r. 1860–1869)
