= Tokugawa Yoshikatsu =

- 徳川 慶勝
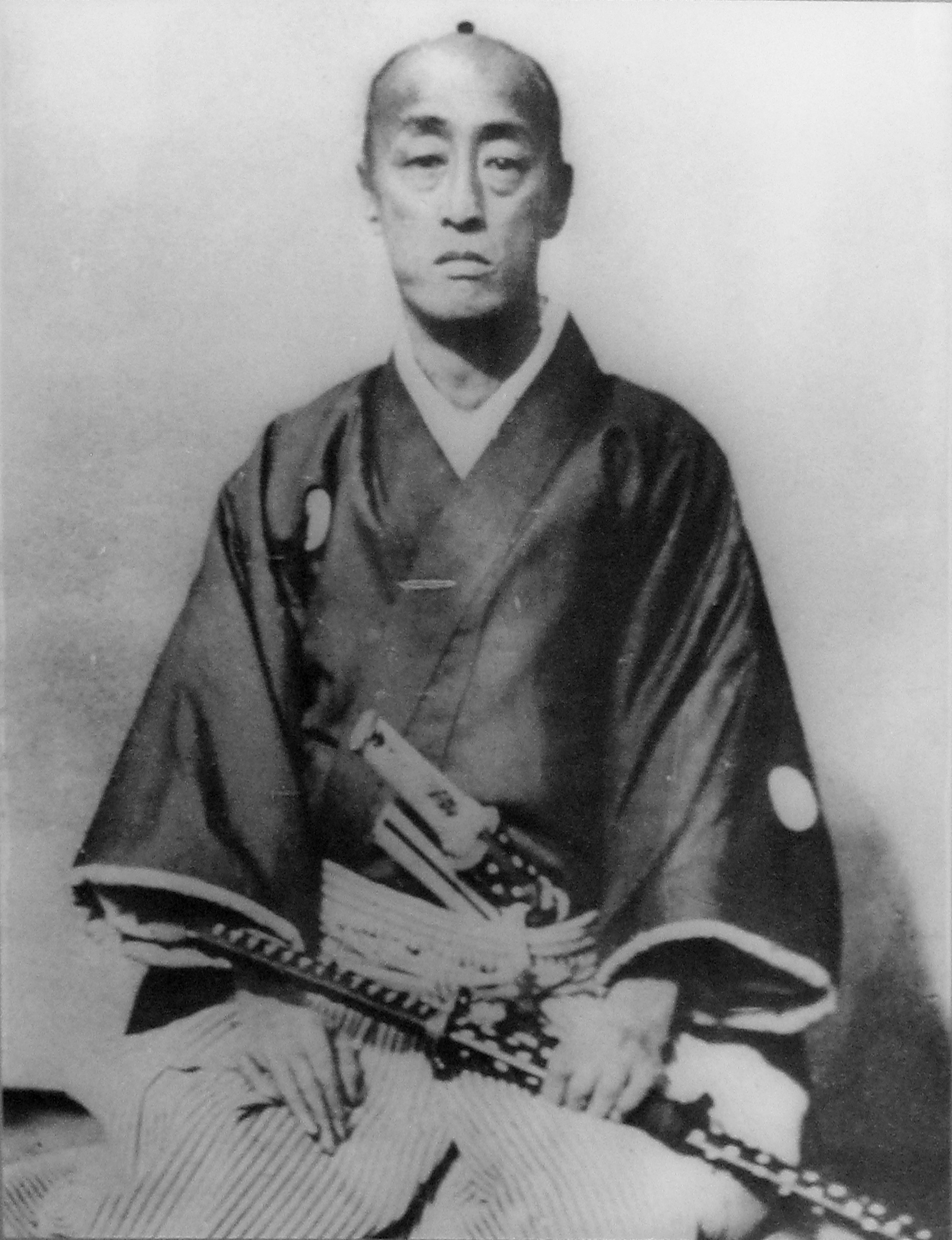

14th (Tokugawa) Lord of Owari
- In office 1849–1858
- Preceded by: Tokugawa Yoshitsugu
- Succeeded by: Tokugawa Mochinaga

17th (Tokugawa) Lord of Owari
- In office 1870–1880
- Preceded by: Tokugawa Yoshinori
- Succeeded by: Tokugawa Yoshiakira

Personal details
- Born: April 14, 1824 Edo, Japan
- Died: August 1, 1883 (aged 59)
- Spouse: Niwa Kane

Tokugawa Yoshikatsu (徳川 慶勝; April 14, 1824 – August 1, 1883) was a Japanese daimyō of the late Edo period, who ruled the Owari Domain as its 14th (1849–1858) and 17th daimyō (1870–1880). He was the brother of Matsudaira Katamori. His childhood name was Hidenosuke (秀之助).

== Early years ==
Yoshikatsu was born in the Takasu Domain residence (Yotsuya neighborhood of Edo). His mother was Norihime (daughter of Tokugawa Harutoshi), Tokugawa Nariaki was his maternal uncle, and the future shogun Tokugawa Yoshinobu was his cousin.

The most recent four daimyos of the Owari Domain had been foster sons sent to Owari from lineages close to the Shogunal family: Tokugawa Naritomo (10th, 1800–1827) Tokugawa Nariharu (11th, 1827–1839), Tokugawa Naritaka (12th, 1839–1845), Tokugawa Yoshitsugu (13th, 1845–1849). These daimyo been remote rulers, especially the 11th, Nariharu, who had spent all his time in Edo without making a single trip to Owari, resulting in low morale amongst the Owari samurai.

Because Yoshikatsu was perceived as being more sympathetic to affairs in Owari, local political circles such as the Gold & Iron Party (金鉄党) had formed, drawing strength from the low-ranking samurai, to lobby for Yoshikatsu's appointment when the matter arose in 1839 and 1845, but Naritaka and Yoshitsugu had been appointed instead. However, when Yoshikatsu was finally appointed in 1849, he did not have as much clout amongst Bakufu officials and the high-ranking samurai in Owari, due to weaker blood relations to the Shogun than his predecessors. Accordingly, forming a consensus amongst high-ranking retainers was indispensable for Yoshikatsu to exercise his authority.

After being appointed daimyō, Yoshikatsu made administrative changes, primarily to trim costs. Meanwhile, information about the arrival of the Perry Expedition and the Bakufu's accommodation of foreign demands was reaching all the domains, and particularly disturbed Tokugawa Nariaki, Shimazu Nariakira (daimyō of the Satsuma Domain), Date Munenari (daimyō of the Uwajima Domain), and others, who expressed their displeasure with the actions of high functionaries such as Abe Masahiro. With a strong sense of duty as the head of the three collateral branches of the shogunal family, Yoshikatsu felt that the bakufu could only be assisted by paradoxically criticizing its policy.

When the Treaty of Amity and Commerce (United States–Japan) was signed in 1858 (Ansei 5), Yoshikatsu joined with his uncle and cousin—Tokugawa Nariaki and his son Yoshiatsu—together with Matsudaira Yoshinaga (daimyō of the Fukui Domain) and others in making an unsolicited visit to Edo Castle, where they oppose the policies of the Tairō, Ii Naosuke. This act was censured, everyone who opposed Ii Naosuke was purged (the Ansei Purge). For his part Yoshikatsu was placed under house arrest, and he was replaced by his younger brother Mochinaga, who thus became the 15th daimyō of Owari.

During this period, he became interested in Western photography, and learned how to take and develop photographs. Remaining photographs include subjects such as the Ninomaru Palace of Nagoya Castle (taken in 1870), Hiroshima Castle, and the suburban residence of the Owari Domain in Edo, almost 1000 photographs in all, which are a priceless historical record.

== Return to power ==
The assassination of Ii Naosuke in the Sakuradamon Incident (1860) was followed by a general pardon in 1862. Yoshikatsu went to the capitol the same year, being appointed assistant to the Shogun Tokugawa Iemochi. On September 13, 1863, Mochinaga retired, and Yoshikatsu's son Motochiyo (born about the time of the Ansei Purge) was adopted by Mochinaga (15th daimyō), and appointed as the 16th daimyō at the age of six, his name being changed to Tokugawa Yoshinori. With the support of high-ranking samurai in the domain, such as Naruse Masamitsu, Tamiya Joun, Yoshikatsu was able to exert power once again. However others were critical of Yoshikatsu and formed an effective opposition around Morinaga, so the domain was split between the two retired daimyō acting behind the scenes.

== Involvement in Court politics ==
As power shifted from the Edo bakufu to the Imperial Court, Yoshikatsu spent most of his time in Kyoto. In the spring of 1863, Emperor issued "Order to expel barbarians" (攘夷実行の勅命, jōi jikkō no chokumei), and on the last day of the year formed the conference of councillors (Sanyo Kaigi (参預会議))), a panel of powerful daimyo to serve as his military arm. Yoshikatsu was invited to join, but declined. After the Kinmon incident in the summer, in which samurai from the Chōshū Domain attempted a coup against the Tokugawa Bakufu, Yoshitaka served as the military commander during the punitive First Chōshū expedition, in September–November 1864, with Saigō Takamori as second-in-command. The campaign was considered a success, but, when Chōshū again challenged Bakufu authority, Yoshikatsu refused to participate in the Second Chōshū expedition, which ended in a loss of prestige for the Bakufu and a secret alliance between the Satsuma and Chōshū domains, an alliance that soon overthrew the shogunate.

== Family ==
- Father: Matsudaira Yoshitatsu (1800-1862)
- Mother: Norihime, daughter of Tokugawa Harutoshi
- Wife: Kanehime, daughter of Niwa Nagatomi
- Concubines:
  - Otama no Kata
  - Oyuki no Kata
  - Otake no Kata
  - Okatsu no Kata
- Children:
  - Tokugawa Yoshinori by Otama
  - Michihime by Otama
  - Toyohime by Otama
  - Yoshihime married Tokugawa Yoshiakira by Otake
  - Tomihime married Mouri Motoakira by Otake
  - Tokugawa Yoshikumi (1878-1946) by Okatsu

== Honours ==
- Junior First Rank (1869)

Japanese royalty
Preceded by Tokugawa Yoshitsugu	14th (Tokugawa) daimyō of Owari; 1849–1858	Succeeded by Tokugawa Mochinaga
Preceded by Tokugawa Yoshinori	17th (Tokugawa) daimyō of Owari; 1870–1880	Succeeded by Tokugawa Yoshiakira
