= Yoshitsugu =

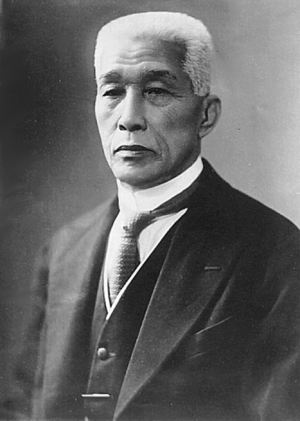
- Yoshitsugu Yamashita (1865–1935), first 10th dan judoka
- Pronunciation: joɕitsɯgɯ (IPA)
- Gender: Male

Origin
- Origin: Japanese
- Meaning: Different meanings depending on the kanji used

Other names
- Alternative spelling: Yositugu (Kunrei-shiki) Yositugu (Nihon-shiki) Yoshitsugu (Hepburn)

Yoshitsugu is a masculine Japanese given name.

== Written forms ==
Yoshitsugu can be written using different combinations of kanji characters. Here are some examples:

- 義次, "justice, next"
- 義嗣, "justice, succession"
- 義継, "justice, continue"
- 吉次, "good luck, filial piety"
- 吉嗣, "good luck, succession"
- 吉継, "good luck, continue"
- 善次, "virtuous, next"
- 善嗣, "virtuous, succession"
- 善継, "virtuous, continue"
- 喜次, "rejoice, next"
- 喜嗣, "rejoice, succession"
- 喜継, "rejoice, continue"
- 芳次, "fragrant/virtuous, next"
- 芳嗣, "fragrant/virtuous, succession"
- 芳継, "fragrant/virtuous, continue"
- 好次, "good/like something, next"
- 喜次, "rejoice, next"
- 慶次, "congratulate, next"

The name can also be written in hiragana よしつぐ or katakana ヨシツグ.

== Notable people with the name ==
- Yoshitsugu Nihonmatsu (二本松 義継, 1552–1586), Japanese daimyō of the Sengoku period, 14th head of the Nihonmatsu clan of Mutsu
- Yoshitsugu Maeba (前波 吉継, 1541–1574), retainer beneath the clan of Asakura throughout the late Sengoku period of Feudal Japan
- Yoshitsugu Miyoshi (三好 義継, 1549–1573), samurai of the Sengoku period who was practically the last head of Miyoshi clan
- Yoshitsugu Otani (大谷 吉継, 1559–1600), Japanese samurai of the Sengoku period though Azuchi-Momoyama Period
- Yoshitsugu Tokugawa (徳川 慶臧, 1836–1849), Japanese daimyō of the Edo period, who ruled the Owari Domain
- Yoshitsugu Yamashita (山下 義韶, 1865–1935), first 10th dan judoka
- Yoshitsugu Harada (原田 令嗣, born 1952), Japanese politician of the Liberal Democratic Party, a member of the House of Representatives in the Diet
- Yoshitsugu Matsuoka (松岡 禎丞, born 1986) Japanese voice actor from Hokkaido, Japan
- Yoshitsugu Saito (斎藤 義次, 1890–1944), lieutenant general in the Imperial Japanese Army during World War II

Media related to Yoshitsugu (given name) at Wikimedia Commons
