= Tokunaga =

Tokunaga (徳永 or 德永) is a Japanese surname. Notable people with the surname include:

- Tokunaga clan, Japanese clan
- Ai Tokunaga (徳永 愛; born 1981), Japanese voice actress
- Akihito Tokunaga (徳永 暁人; born 1971), Japanese composer
- Chinami Tokunaga (徳永 千奈美; born 1992), Japanese singer
- Eri Tokunaga (徳永 えり; born 1988), Japanese actress
- Eri Tokunaga (politician) (徳永 エリ; born 1962), Japanese politician
- Hideaki Tokunaga (德永 英明; born 1961), Japanese singer
- Hisashi Tokunaga (徳永 久志; born 1963), Japanese politician
- Sunao Tokunaga, Japanese writer
- Yoshitaka Tokunaga (德永 祥尭; born 1992), Japanese rugby sevens player
- Yuhei Tokunaga (徳永 悠平; born 1983), Japanese footballer

== See also ==
- 7160 Tokunaga, asteroid
- Tokunaga Station, Japanese train station
