= Tokugawa Narimasa =

Tokugawa Narimasa (徳川 斉匡, June 3, 1779 – July 8, 1848) was a Japanese samurai of the Edo period. The son of Tokugawa Harusada, head of the Hitotsubashi-Tokugawa house, he succeeded Tokugawa Haruaki as head of the Tayasu branch of the Tokugawa house, which had been without a ruler for some time. His childhood name was Yoshinosuke (慶之丞).

== Family ==
- Father: Tokugawa Harusada (1751-1827), 2nd head of Hitotsubashi-Tokugawa house, and grandson of the 8th shōgun Tokugawa Yoshimune
- Mother: Maruyama-dono
- Wife: Kan’in no Miya Sadako (1787-1825)
- Concubines:
  - Kakei-dono
  - Yagi-dono
  - Kawai-dono
  - Saito-dono
  - Shinozaki-dono (1794-1858)
  - Takatsuki-dono
  - Oran no Kata (1796-1817)
- Children:
  - Kinhime (1800-1830) married Tokugawa Narinori of Hitotsubashi-Tokugawa family by Sadako
  - Shizuhime (1803-1803) by Sadako
  - Tokugawa Masatoki (1805-1839) by Sadako
  - Naohime (1807-1872) married Tokugawa Naritaka of Owari Domain (and son of the 11th shōgun Tokugawa Ienari) by Sadako
  - Takeshisuke (1799-1800) by Kakei
  - Tsuhime (1800-1801) by Kakei
  - Hi-hime (1805-1860) married Matsudaira Sadamichi of Kuwana Domain by Yagi
  - Ryohime (1808-1890) married Sakai Tadaaki of Obama Domain by Yagi
  - Aihime (1813-1832) married Tokugawa Nariharu of Owari Domain (and son of the 11th shōgun Tokugawa Ienari) by Yagi
  - Tokugawa Yoshihisa (1823-1847) of Hitotsubashi-Tokugawa Family by Yagi
  - Sonosuke (1824-1825) by Yagi
  - Miru’in (1807-1807) by Kawai
  - Kenzaburo (1814-1817) by Kawai
  - Suruda-hime (1807-1820) betrothed to Tsugaru Nobuyuki of Hirosaki Domain by Saito
  - Kinhime (1809-1851) married Tsugaru Nobuyuki of Hirosaki Domain as second Wife by Saito
  - Kihime (1811-1817) betrothed to Matsudaira Sadakazu of Kuwana Domain by Shonozaki
  - San-sen hime (1818-1820) by Shonozaki
  - Senjuhime (1821-1860) married Matsudaira Takeshige of Hamada Domain
  - Tokugawa Yoshiyori of Tayasu-Tokugawa Family by Shonozaki
  - Tsunehime (1815-1819) by Takatsuki
  - Toshihime (1816-1818) by Takatsuki
  - Tokugawa Narikura (1818-1837) of Hitotsubashi-Tokugawa Family by Takatsuki
  - Junhime (1821-1906) married Tachibana Akitomo of Yanagawa Domain by Takatsuki
  - Yaehime (1823-1826) by Takatsuki
  - Ikunosuke (1825-1826) by Takatsuki
  - Itarihime (1824-1826) by Oran
  - Matsudaira Shungaku of Fukui Domain by Oran
  - Fudehime (1830-1886) married Nabeshima Naomasa of Saga Domain by Oran
  - Tokugawa Yoshitsugu of Owari Domain by Oran

== Ancestry ==
Ancestors of Tokugawa Narimasa

16. Tokugawa Mitsusada, 2nd daimyō of Kishū (1627-1705)
8.Tokugawa Yoshimune, 8th Tokugawa Shōgun (1684-1751)
17. Jōenin (1655-1726)
4. Tokugawa Munetada, 1st Hitotsubashi-Tokugawa family head (1721-1765)
18. Taniguchi Masatsugu
9.Shinshin'in (1700-1721)
2. Tokugawa Harusada, 2nd Hitotsubashi-Tokugawa family head (1751-1827)
5. Hosoda (Oyuka no Kata)
1. Tokugawa Narimasa, 3rd Tayasu-Tokugawa family head
3. Maruyama

Preceded by Tokugawa Haruaki	Tayasu-Tokugawa family head 1787-1836	Succeeded by Tokugawa Naritaka
