= Hashimoto Sanai =

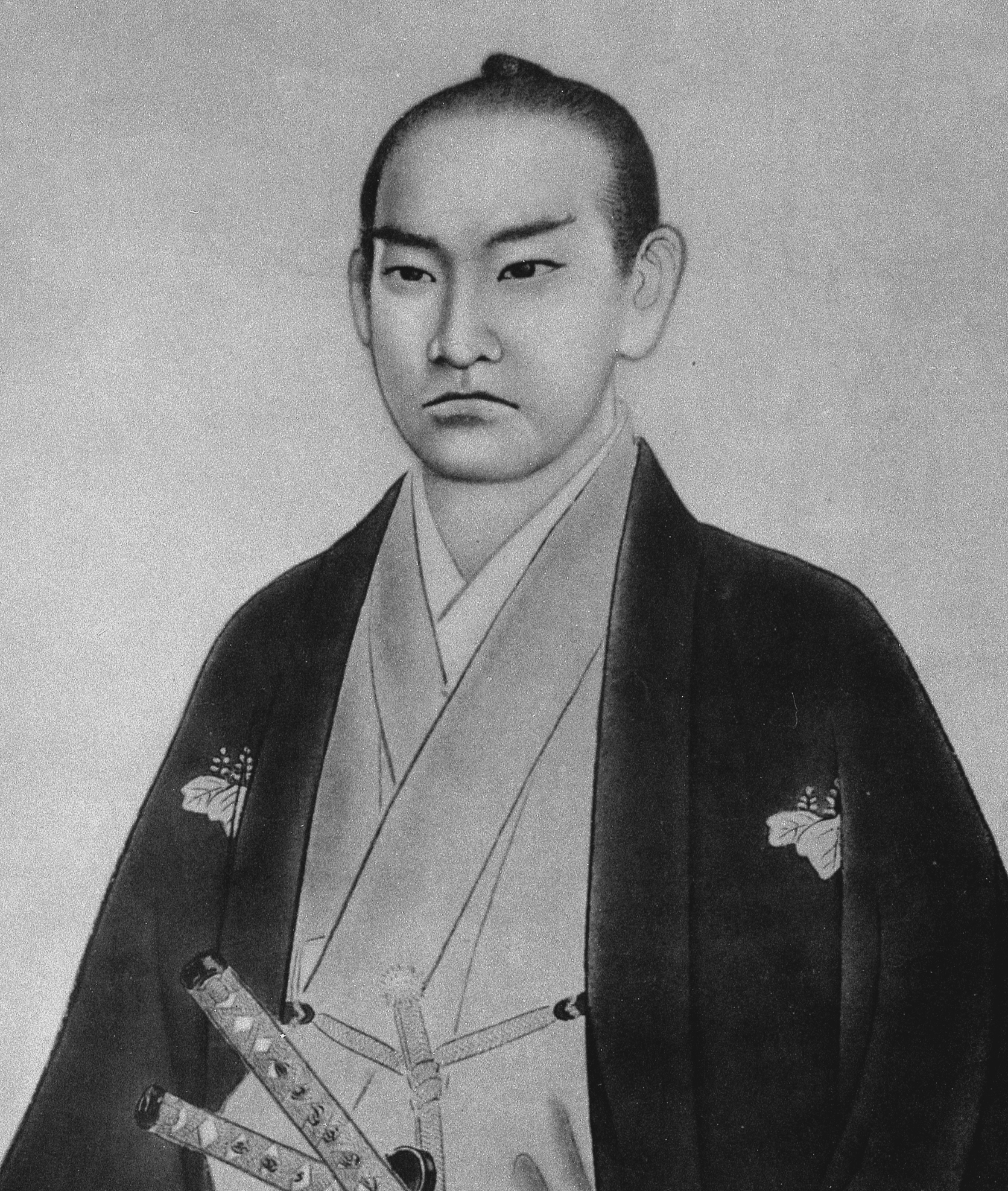
Portrait of Sanai Hashimoto

Sanai Hashimoto (橋本 左内, Hashimoto Sanai; April 19, 1834 - November 1, 1859) was a Japanese samurai and loyal supporter of the Emperor during the final days of the Tokugawa regime.

== Biography ==
Hashimoto was born April 19, 1834, in Echizen Province, Japan. The son of a doctor in the Fukui Clan, he studied medicine in Osaka studied under Dr. Ogata Koan of Rankata Doctor at Tekijuku and Tokyo, where he befriended Saigō Takamori and others. Upon returning to Echizen, he joined the Clan as a Shoinban and became Deputy Head of the Fukui Domain school.

Inviting Yokoi Shōnan as political adviser on behalf of the daimyō Matsudaira Yoshinaga, he became a key figure in the governmental reforms of the clan. Summoned to Edo in 1857 he actively tried to promote, albeit unsuccessfully, Hitotsubashi Yoshinobu to the 14th Shogunate.

After Ii Naosuke was appointed Tairō of the Tokugawa shogunate he purged over 100 people in an effort to quiet opposition in what became known as the Ansei Purge. Hashimoto was one of those prosecuted and was executed by decapitation at Edo's Kozukappara execution grounds on November 1, 1859. In October 2009, a descendant of Naosuke reconciled with the people of Fukui at a memorial service marking the 150th anniversary of the execution.
