= Yoshichika Tokugawa =

Japanese botanist (1886–1976)

Marquess Yoshichika Tokugawa
- 德川義親
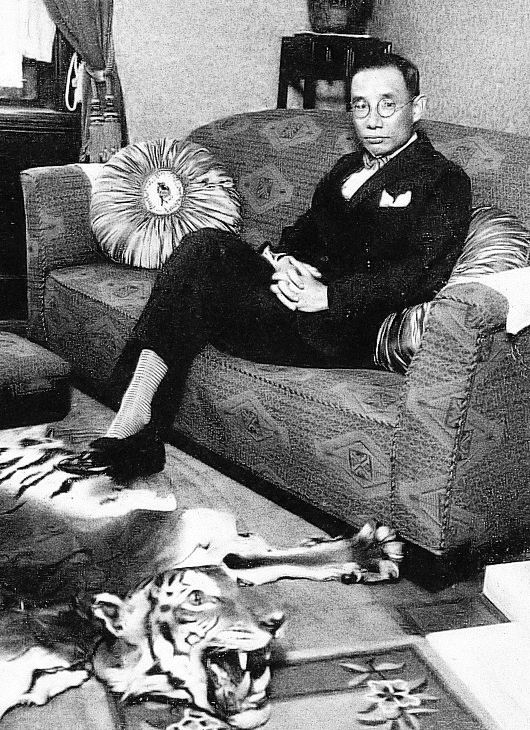
- Born: October 5, 1886; Koishikawa, Tokyo
- Died: September 6, 1976 (aged 89); Toshima, Tokyo
- Education: Tokyo Imperial University
- Title: 19th head of the Owari-Tokugawa family
- Spouse: Yoneko Tokugawa
- Children: Yoshitomo Tokugawa
- Parents: Shungaku Matsudaira (father); Fushiko Nukaya (mother)
- Family: Yoshitami Matsudaira (brother)

Marquess Yoshichika Tokugawa (德川 義親, Tokugawa Yoshichika; 5 October 1886 – 6 September 1976) was a Japanese botanist, hunter, patron of the arts and sciences, and politician. He was the 19th head of the Owari-Tokugawa family, one of the Tokugawa Gosanke.

== Biography ==
Yoshichika was born into the Matsudaira family of Echizen (now Fukui), which originated as a cadet branch of the Tokugawa family and was closely related to the family through repeated intermarriages. He was the youngest son of Shungaku Matsudaira. Like other children of his class (kazoku), Yoshichika attended Gakushuin, where he spent most of his time reading books about explorers such as Henry Stanley and Roald Amundsen. He started studying seriously around 1902, when he entered a crammer called Jishusha.

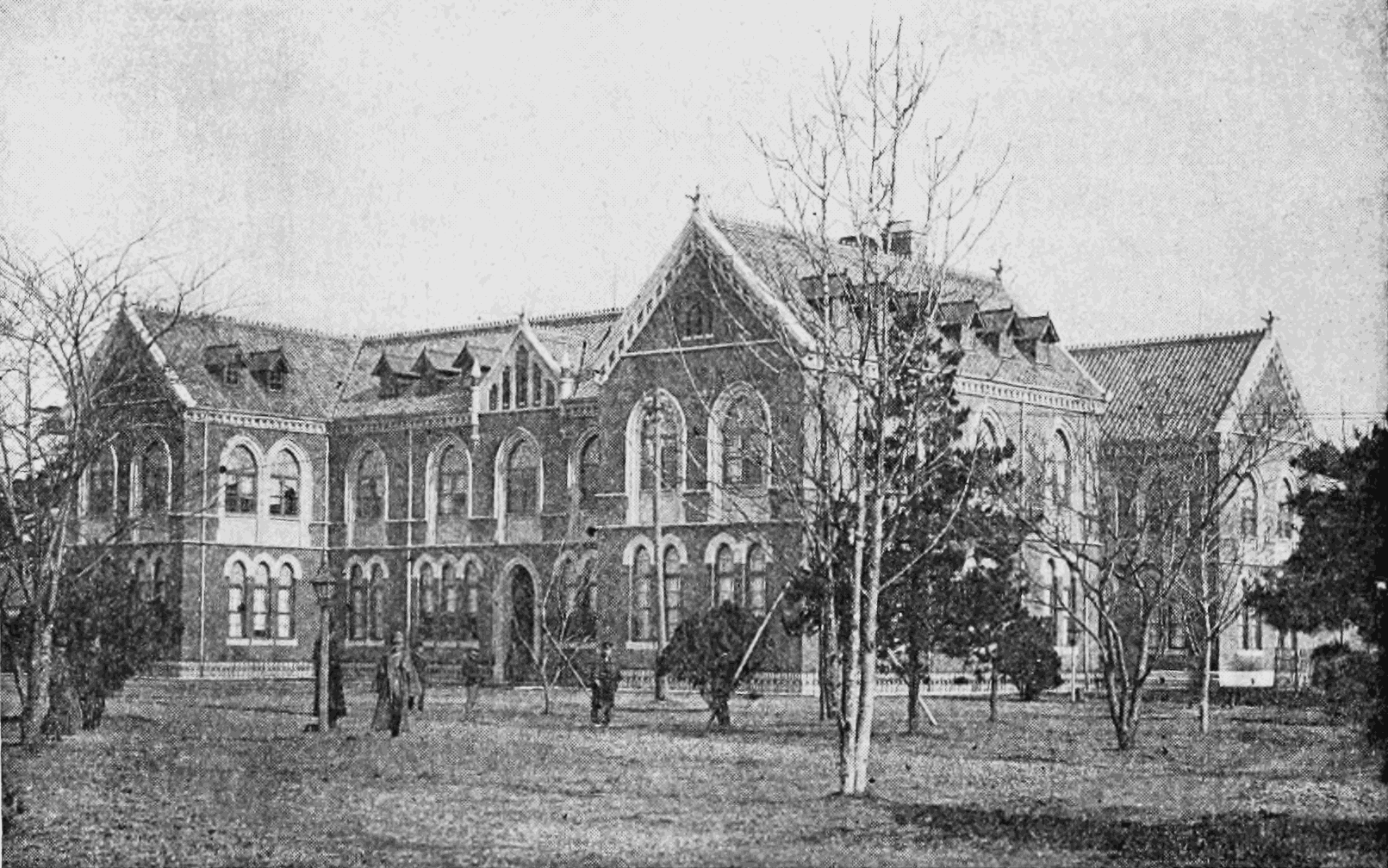
Zoology department building of the University of Tokyo, photographed around the time Tokugawa was a student there

Yoshichika married Yoneko, eldest daughter of Marquess Yoshiakira Tokugawa, the 18th head of the Owari-Tokugawa family, and was adopted as heir to the family. When his father-in-law died soon afterwards, Yoshichika became the 19th head of the family.

He enrolled at the Tokyo Imperial University in 1908 and studied history. His thesis in 1911 was on the management of the vast Kiso estate traditionally owned by his family. Having been interested in botany from a young age, he decided to stay at the university to further his interests. During his time at the university, he granted the faculty of the university access to his family's treasures. In May 1915, he held an exhibition of his family's artefacts at the Sanjo Hall of the university's Hongo Campus. Overwhelmed by the interest shown by the visitors, he recognised the importance of preserving and exhibiting family artefacts. He set up the Tokugawa Art Museum and the Hosa Library in the 1930s to permanently preserve and exhibit the family artefacts.

His passion for botany and hunting made him travel extensively, including his elephant and tiger hunting tour in British Malaya, which gave him the nickname "toragari no tonosama (tiger-hunting lord)". He befriended local sultans in Malaya, and after returning from his second visit in 1929, he started learning the Malay language. He hosted Sultan Ibrahim of Johor and Ranee Sylvia Brett of the Raj of Sarawak in the 1930s.

Like other Marquesses, Tokugawa was a member of the House of Peers by right. In that position he supported reform of the House of Peers and opposed the Peace Preservation Law in 1925, but he had little influence. Tokugawa gave a substantial amount of money to the Sakurakai, a secret society of young officers who launched a failed coup d'etat in March 1931, known as the March incident. Later in life Tokugawa stated he had supported the coup because he was "disgusted by the corruption of the Diet."

During the Second World War, he went to what was now Japanese-occupied Malaya as a military advisor, where he served as the director at what is now the National Museum of Singapore. However, as Japan faced significant losses, he had to return to Japan in 1944. The English botanist E. J. H. Corner, who was asked to continue serving as the director of the Singapore Botanical Gardens during the occupation, wrote about the marquess's activities in his memoir "The MARQUIS - A Tale of Syonan-to".

After the war, he funded the founding of the Japan Socialist Party. His fortune had diminished to no more than 20% of its pre-war extent. He served as an honorary chair at various charitable organisations. He died in 1976.
