= Horibata-chō, Nagoya =

Neighbourhood of Nagoya, Japan

Coordinates: 35°11′17″N 136°53′52″E

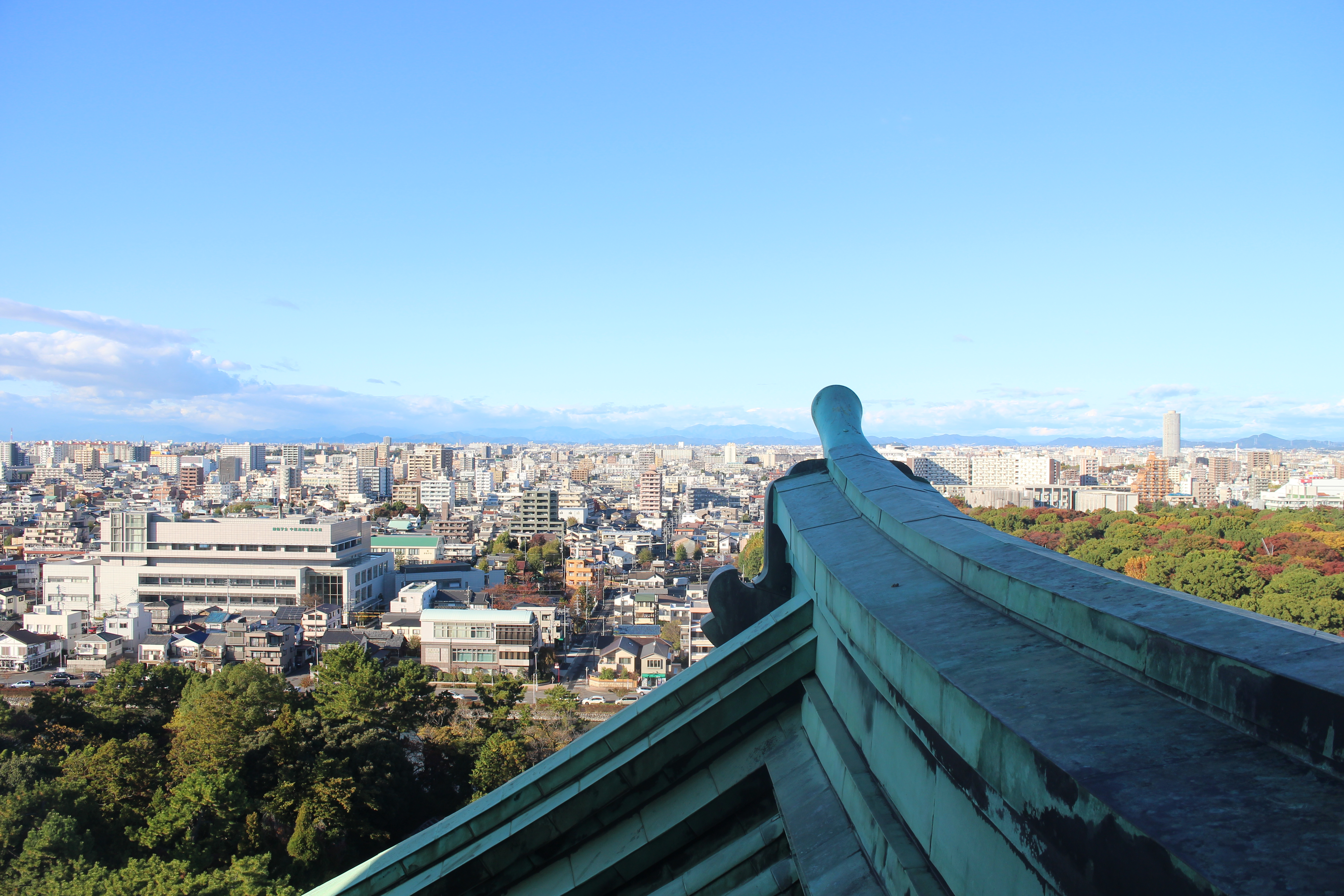
View of Horibata-chō (lower left side) from the main keep of Nagoya Castle

Horibata-chō (堀端町) is a historic neighbourhood located in the Nishi ward of Nagoya, central Japan.

== History ==
The area is located north of central enceinte across the moat of Nagoya Castle and west of the former Ofuke Garden, known as Meijō Park since 1931. The northern border is delineated by the man-made Hori river. The name translates to "town at the edge of the moat".

The whole area was the site of the New Palace (新御殿 Shin Goten) of Tokugawa Naritomo (1793–1850), 10th Lord of the Owari Domain. It is not clear when the New Palace disappeared.

The area is built over by residential housing and office buildings. The only green area left is the small Horibata Park (堀端公園), which was inaugurated in the early 1980's. A large part of the northern side along the river is occupied by the offices of the Sōka Gakkai and their Aichi Prefecture branch.

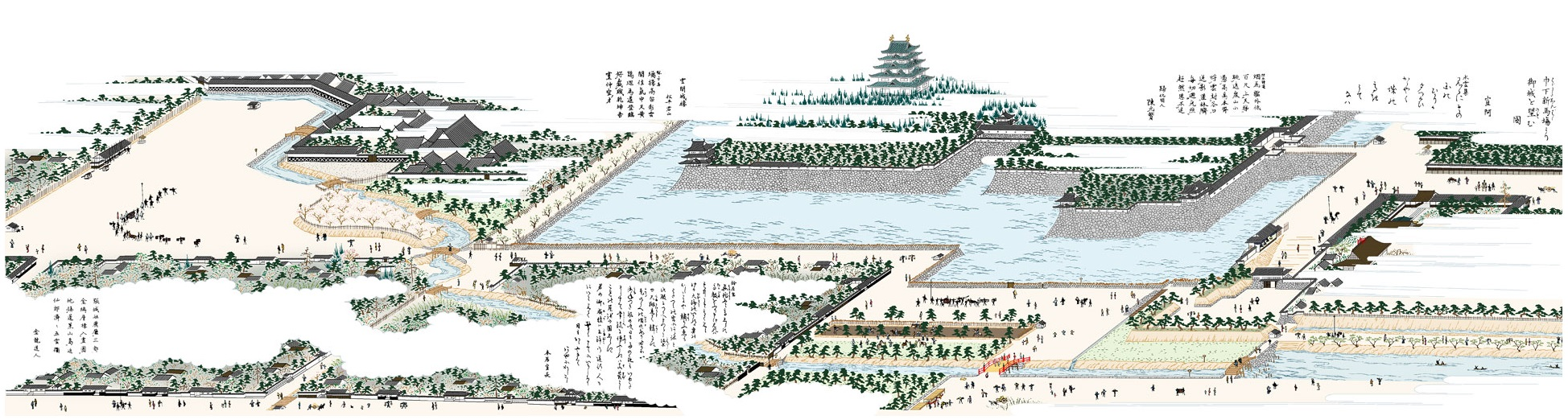
Print from the Owari meisho zue depicting Nagoya Castle in the late Edo period seen from the west. From left: The Hori river running below and the New Palace (新御殿 Shin Goten) of Lord Tokugawa Naritomo, in-between the river and the castle moat, what is today Horibata-chō. The main keep of Nagoya Castle is depicted in the centre.

== See also ==
- Funairi-chō, Nagoya
