= Tokunaga clan =

Tokunaga clan (徳永氏, Tokunaga-shi) was a Japanese clan of the premodern period, which claimed descent from the Fujiwara clan. During the late Azuchi-Momoyama to early Edo periods, one of its branches was the daimyō family which ruled the Takasu fief. It was dispossessed by the Shogunate, but later forgiven, and carried on as a high-ranking hatamoto family.
