= Tokugawa Munechika =

Japanese daimyō

Tokugawa Munechika (徳川 宗睦, October 27, 1733 – January 14, 1800) was a Japanese daimyō of the Edo period, who ruled the Owari Domain. His childhood name was Kumagoro (熊五郎).

== Family ==
- Father: Tokugawa Munekatsu
- Mother: Okayo no Kata
- Wife: Konoe Yoshigimi, eldest daughter of Konoe Iehisa
- Children:
  - Tokugawa Haruyoshi (1753-1773) by Kokun
  - Tokugawa Haruoki (1756-1776) by Kokun

Japanese royalty
Preceded by Tokugawa Munekatsu	9th (Tokugawa) daimyō of Owari; 1761–1799	Succeeded by Tokugawa Naritomo
