= Tokugawa Muneharu =

Japanese daimyō (1696–1764)

Tokugawa Muneharu (徳川 宗春; November 20, 1696 – November 1, 1764) was a daimyō in Japan during the Edo period. He was the seventh Tokugawa lord of the Owari Domain, and one of the gosanke. He promoted deregulation and transformed Nagoya into one of Japan's major cities, but he fell from power due to his conflict with the Shogun Tokugawa Yoshimune.

== Biography ==
Muneharu was the 20th son of Tokugawa Tsunanari by a concubine later known as Senyoin, and a great-great-grandson of Tokugawa Ieyasu. His childhood name was Bangoro (萬五郎). During his lifetime, he rose to the junior third rank in the Imperial court, and held the titular office of Gon-Chūnagon (acting middle councilor). He was posthumously awarded the junior second rank and the office of Gon-Dainagon (acting great councilor). Among his brothers were Tokugawa Yoshimichi and Tokugawa Tsugutomo (the fourth and sixth lords of Owari), and Matsudaira Yoshitaka (second lord of the Mino Takasu Domain). A sister, Matsuhime, married Maeda Yoshinori, lord of the Kaga Domain, which was the richest domain in Japan outside the Tokugawa's own holdings. Muneharu did not marry, but had numerous concubines. His fourth daughter married the kampaku Konoe Uchisaki.

=== Loss of power ===
Given to personal luxury, in 1731, Muneharu published a book, Onchiseiyō (温知政要), which criticized ruling shōgun Tokugawa Yoshimune for his policy of excessive frugality. In 1739, following a long dispute with Yoshimune, Muneharu was forced into retirement and confined within the grounds of Nagoya Castle. A relative succeeded him as lord of Owari, taking the name Tokugawa Munekatsu. After the death of Yoshimune, Muneharu moved outside the palace grounds. He died in 1764, but was not forgiven, and a metal net was placed over his grave to indicate his status. When a later shōgun installed his own son as lord of Owari, 75 years after the death of Muneharu, he had the net removed as a gesture of pardon.

== Family ==
- Father: Tokugawa Tsunanari
- Mother: Umezu later Senyoin (d.1743)
- Concubines:
  - Saizu later Geshoin
  - Gekkoin
  - Iyo no Kata
- Children:
  - Tomohime (1724–1733) by Saizu
  - Hachihime (1726–1731) by Saizu
  - Kunimaru (1729–1735) by Saizu
  - Shohime (1726–1735) by Gekkoin
  - Naohime (1730–1731) by Gekkoin
  - Ryuchiyo (1737–1737) by Gekkoin
  - Katsuhime (1728–1760) married Konoe Uchisaki by Iyo
  - Itsuhime (1730–1731) by Iyo

== In fiction ==
In the popular TV Asahi television series Abarenbō Shōgun, showing fictitious events in the life of the Shōgun Tokugawa Yoshimune, Muneharu was frequently presented as the villain, repeatedly trying to assassinate Yoshimune and take over the shogunate. Even when he did not appear, many smaller villains acted in his name, or planned to receive their reward from Muneharu when he became shōgun. He was first played by Akira Nakao and later by Tokuma Nishioka. As with the series in general, while the setting is historical, the specific acts attributed to Muneharu are fictional.

In the book Blood Ninja, he is the father of the main character Taro and enemy to Oda Nobunaga.

Preceded by Matsudaira Yoshizane	4th (Owari-Matsudaira) daimyō of Yanagawa; 1729–1730	Succeeded by none
Preceded by Tokugawa Tsugutomo	7th (Tokugawa) daimy of Owari; 1730–1739	Succeeded by Tokugawa Munekatsu
