= Tokugawa Yoshinori =

Japanese daimyō

Tokugawa Yoshinori (徳川 義宜; July 4, 1858 – November 24, 1875) was governor of Nagoya Domain in Japan. Appointed in 1869, he ceded the post to his father the following year. In 1871, he moved to Tokyo, where he died in 1875 due to illness.

The third son of Tokugawa Yoshikatsu, he was adopted by his uncle Tokugawa Mochinaga and became 16th lord of the Owari Domain at age six. His original name was Naganari (徳成).

Japanese royalty
Preceded by Tokugawa Mochinaga	16th (Tokugawa) daimyō of Owari; 1864–1870	Succeeded by Tokugawa Yoshikatsu
