= Tokugawa Munekatsu =

Japanese daimyō

Tokugawa Munekatsu (徳川 宗勝; 1705–1761) was a Japanese daimyō of the Edo period. He ruled the Takasu Domain in Mino, and later succeeded his cousin Tokugawa Muneharu, who had been placed under house arrest, to become eighth Tokugawa lord of the Owari Domain in Nagoya. In that capacity, Munekatsu enacted political reforms that reversed the extravagances of his predecessor, Muneharu.

As lord of Takasu he used the name Matsudaira Yoshiatsu (松平 義淳). His other names were Tomosuke (友相) and Tomoatsu (友淳).

== Family ==
- Father: Matsudaira Tomoaki (1678-1728), son of Tokugawa Mitsutomo of Owari Domain
- Mother: Oshige no Kata
- Wife: Tokugawa Mitsuhime, daughter of Tokugawa Yoshimichi of Owari Domain
- Concubines:
  - Okayo no Kata
  - Otase no Kata
  - Oyatsu no Kata
  - Osume no Kata
  - Otome no Kata
  - Tokuei'in
  - Senyuin
  - Terashima-Dono
- Children:
  - Yorozunosuke (1730-1732) by Mitsuhime
  - Fusahime betrothed to Shimazu Munenobu of Satsuma Domain by Okayo
  - Tokugawa Munechika by Okayo
  - Matsudaira Yoshitoshi (1734-1771) by Otase
  - Toyohime married Uesugi Shigesada of Yonezawa Domain by Otase
  - Matsudaira Katsushige by Otase
  - Matsudaira Katsunaga (1737-1811) by Otase
  - Naito Yorita (1741-1771) by Otase
  - Matsudaira Katsutsuna by Oyatsu
  - Takenokoshi Katsuoki (1738-1789) by Oyatsu
  - Kunihime married Asano Shigeakira of Hiroshima Domain by Oyatsu
  - Inoue Masakuni (1739-1791) by Osume
  - Hi-hime married Matsudaira Yorisaki of Hitachi-Fuchu Domain by Osume
  - Kyohime married Kujo Michisaki by Tokuei'in
  - Yokohime married Asano Shigeakira of Hiroshima Domain by Tokuei'in
  - Matsudaira Katsutaka by Terashima
  - Naito Masanobu (1752-1805) by Senyuin

Japanese royalty
Preceded by Matsudaira Yoshitaka	3rd (Owari-Matsudaira) daimyō of Takasu; 1732–1739	Succeeded by Matsudaira Yoshitoshi
Preceded by Tokugawa Muneharu	8th (Tokugawa) daimyō of Owari; 1739–1761	Succeeded by Tokugawa Munechika
