= Tokugawa Naritaka =

Japanese daimyō

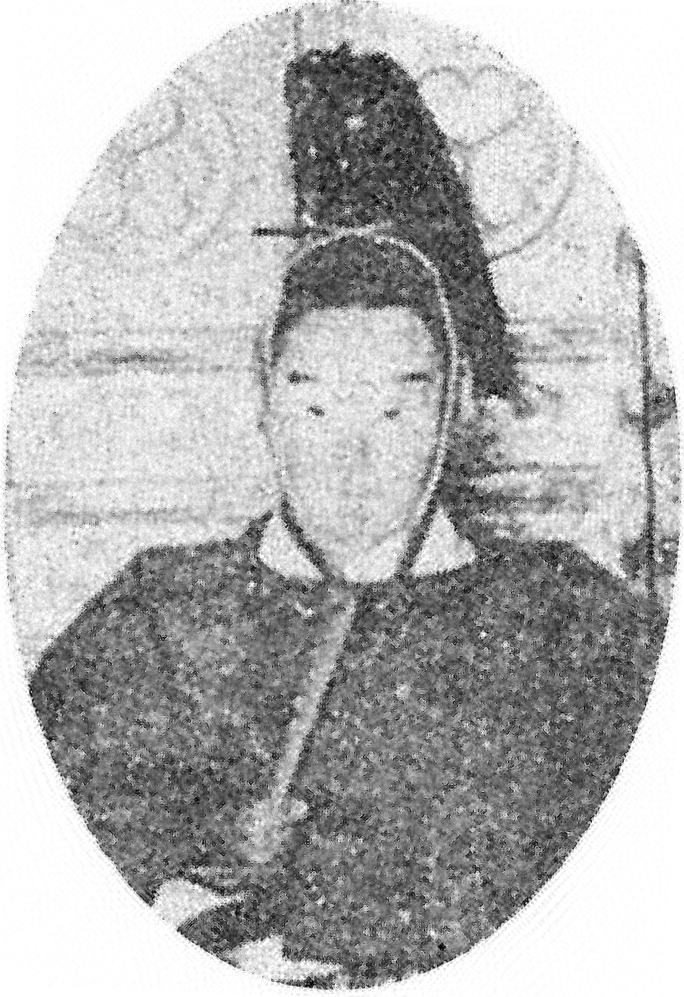
Tokugawa Naritaka

Tokugawa Naritaka (徳川 斉荘, June 13, 1810 – July 6, 1845) was a Japanese daimyō of the early late-Edo period. The 14th son of the 11th shōgun Tokugawa Ienari, he succeeded Tokugawa Narimasa as head of the Tayasu Tokugawa house in 1836. In 1839, he became the 12th lord of the Owari domain. He studied tea ceremony with the 11th Sen Sōshitsu. His pen names were Chitosai (知止斎) and Kinjō Sanjin (金城山人).

His childhood name was Tanabenosuke (要之丞).

== Family ==
- Father: 11th shōgun Tokugawa Ienari
- Mother: Ocho no Kata (?-1852) later Sokuseiin
- Adopted Fathers:
  - Tokugawa Narimasa
  - Tokugawa Nariharu
- Adopted Mother:
  - Shimazu Shigehime (1773-1844) wife of Tokugawa Ienari
- Wife: Tokugawa Naohime daughter of Tokugawa Narimasa, head of the Tayasu branch of the Tokugawa house
- Concubine: Miyata no Kata
- Children:
  - Shomaru (1846-1847) inherited Hitotsubashi-Tokugawa family by Miyata
  - Toshihime married Asano Yoshiteru of Hiroshima Domain
  - Fushihime married Matsudaira Noritoshi

Japanese royalty
| Preceded by Tokugawa Narimasa | 4th Tayasu-Tokugawa family head 1836–1839 | Succeeded by Tokugawa Yoshiyori |
| Preceded by Tokugawa Nariharu | 12th (Tokugawa) daimyō of Owari; 1839–1845 | Succeeded by Tokugawa Yoshitsugu |
