= Tokugawa Naritomo =

Japanese daimyō

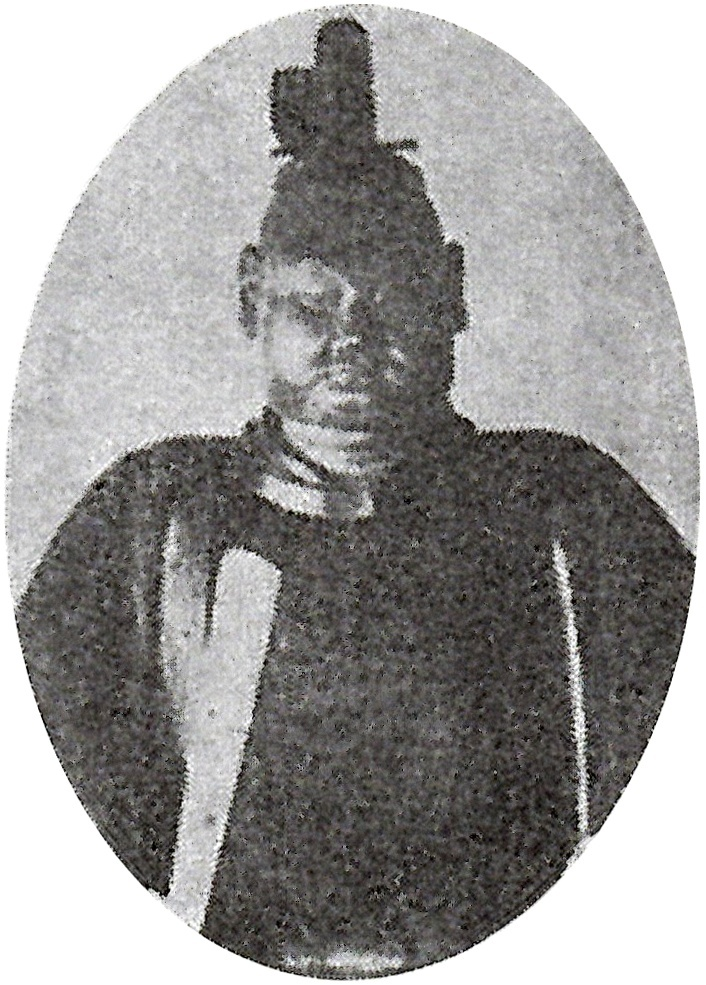
Statue of Tokugawa Naritomo, kept at Chōe-ji in Nagoya

Tokugawa Naritomo (徳川 斉朝, September 27, 1793 – May 11, 1850) was a Japanese daimyō of the Edo period, who ruled the Owari Domain. His childhood name was Yasuchiyo (愷千代).

He had a retreat north of Nagoya Castle called Shin Goten (新御殿 New Palace) in what is today Horibata-chō (堀端町).

== Family ==
- Father: Tokugawa Harukuni (1776–1793), brother of the 11th shōgun Tokugawa Ienari
- Mother: Nijo Yasuko, daughter of Nijo Harutaka
- Wife: Tokugawa Toshihime (1789–1817), daughter of the 11th shōgun Tokugawa Ienari

Japanese royalty
Preceded by Tokugawa Munechika	10th (Tokugawa) daimyō of Owari; 1800–1827	Succeeded by Tokugawa Nariharu
