= Tokugawa Yoshinao =

Japanese daimyō (1601–1650)

- 徳川 義直
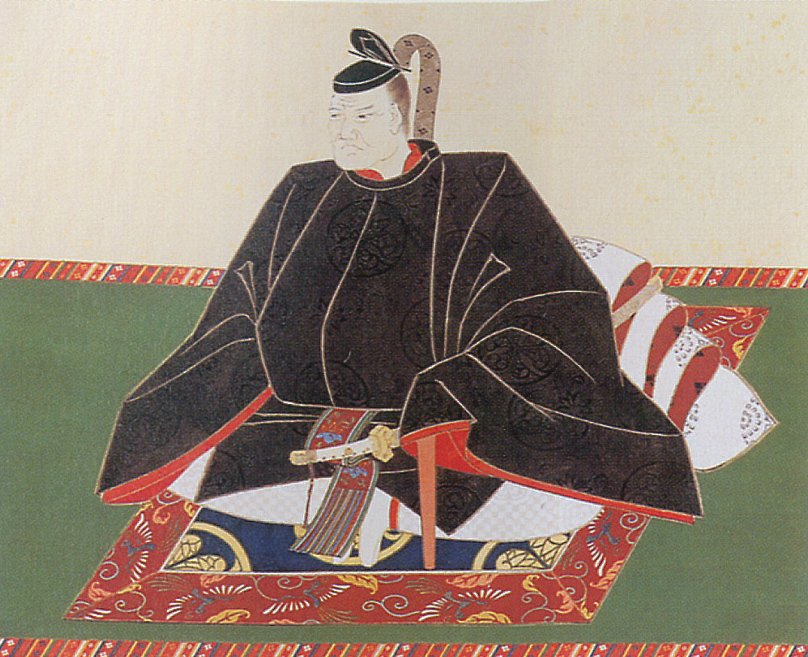

1st Lord of Owari
- In office 1610–1650
- Preceded by: None
- Succeeded by: Tokugawa Mitsutomo

Personal details
- Born: January 2, 1601
- Died: June 5, 1650 (aged 49)
- Spouse: Asano Haru
- Children: Tokugawa Mitsutomo
- Parent: Tokugawa Ieyasu (father)

Tokugawa Yoshinao (徳川 義直; January 2, 1601 – June 5, 1650) was a Japanese daimyō of the early Edo period.

== Biography ==
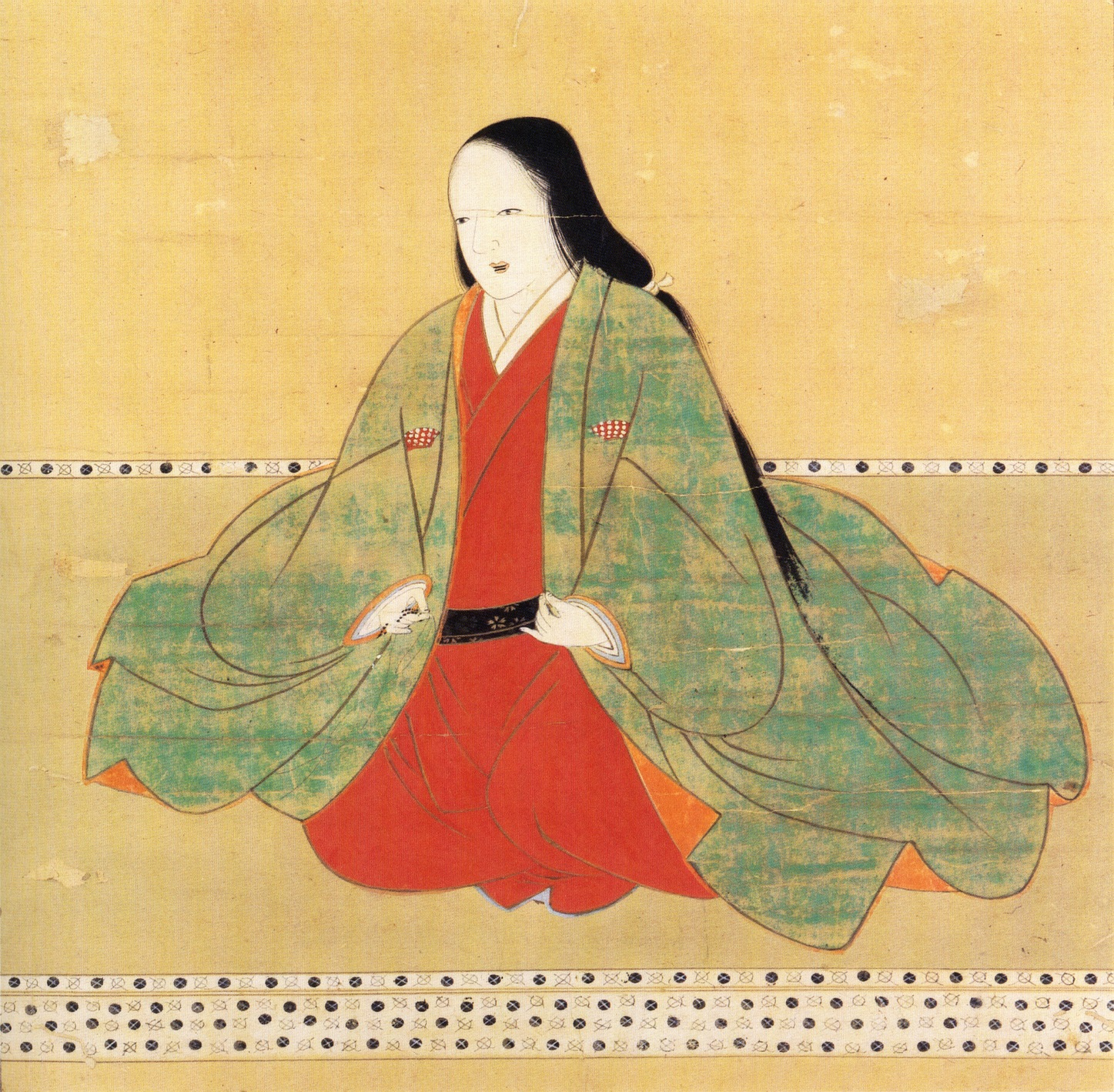
Okame no Kata, Yoshinao's mother

Born the ninth son of Tokugawa Ieyasu with his concubine, Okame no Kata. His childhood name was Gorōtamaru (五郎太丸). While still a young child, he was appointed leader of first the fief of Kofu in Kai Province and later the fief of Kiyosu in Owari Province. In 1610, he was appointed leader of the Owari Domain (present-day Nagoya), one of the most important regions in the country, thus founding the Owari-Tokugawa house. A holder of the 2nd court rank, junior grade (ju-ni-i), he had the title of dainagon (major counselor).

During the Kan'ei era (1624–44) he had a kiln constructed at the corner of the Ofuke enceinte (Ofukemaru) of Nagoya Castle and invited potters from Seto to make pottery there. This became known as Ofukei ware.

Yoshinao began learning Shinkage-ryū from Yagyū Hyōgonosuke at age 16, and was named the 4th sōke at age 21.

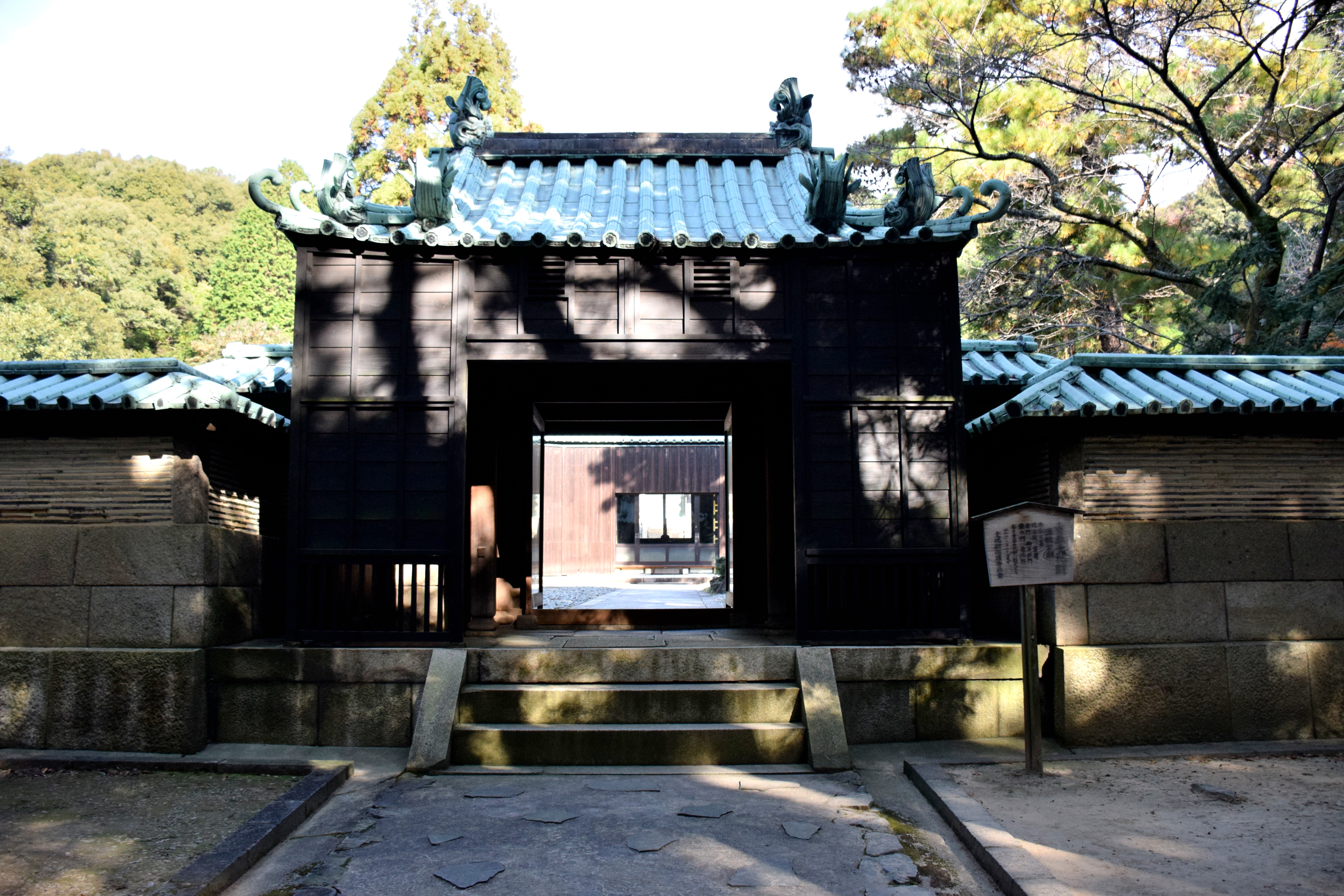
Gate to the Mausoleum of Tokugawa Yoshinao at Jōkō-ji, Seto

His remains were cremated and laid to rest at his mausoleum in Jōkō-ji (Seto).

== Family ==
Yoshinao's principal wife was Haruhime, the daughter of Asano Yoshinaga of Kii (whose family was later transferred to Hiroshima), and his concubines included Osai and Ojō no Kata. He had two children: Mitsutomo, who succeeded him as daimyō of Owari, and Shiko or Kyōhime who married Hirohata Tadayuki, a court noble.

- Father: Tokugawa Ieyasu
- Mother: Okame no Kata (1573–1642) later Sōōin
- Wife: Asano Haruhime (1593–1637) later Kōgen-in, daughter of Asano Yoshinaga of Kishū Domain
- Concubines:
  - Osai no Kata later Sadashin-in
  - Ojō no Kata later Kankiin
- Children:
  - Tokugawa Mitsutomo by Ojō
  - Kyōhime (1626–1674) by Osai and married Hirohata Tadayuki

Preceded by none	1st (Tokugawa) daimyō of Owari; 1610–1650	Succeeded by Tokugawa Mitsutomo
