= Matsudaira Yoshinaga =

Japanese daimyō

- 松平 慶永
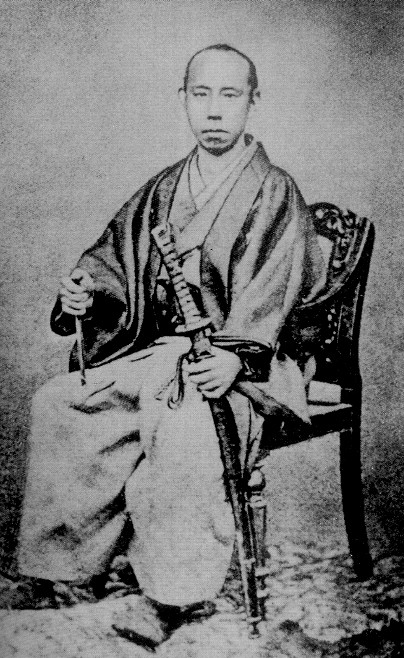
- Born: October 10, 1828; Edo, Japan
- Died: June 2, 1890 (aged 61); Tokyo, Japan
- Burial place: Fukui, Fukui, Japan
- Other name: Matsudaira Shungaku
- Title: Daimyō of Fukui Domain
- Term: 1838-1858
- Predecessor: Matsudaira Narisawa
- Successor: Matsudaira Mochiaki
- Spouse(s): Yu-hime, daughter of Hosokawa Narimori of Kumamoto Domain
- Father: Tokugawa Narimasa
- Family: Matsudaira clan

Matsudaira Yoshinaga (松平 慶永; October 10, 1828 – June 2, 1890), also known as Matsudaira Keiei, or better known as Matsudaira Shungaku (春嶽) was a Japanese daimyō of the Edo period. He was head of Fukui Domain in Echizen Province. He is counted as one of the "Four Wise Lords of the Bakumatsu period" (幕末の四賢侯, Bakumatsu no Shikenkō), along with Date Munenari, Yamauchi Yōdō and Shimazu Nariakira. "Yoshinaga" is his imina and "Shungaku" (春嶽, "Spring Mountain") is his gō.

== Early life ==
Yoshinaga was born in Edo Castle as the eighth son of Tokugawa Narimasa, head of the Tayasu-Tokugawa, one of the gosankyō cadet branches of the Tokugawa clan. His childhood name was "Kinnojo" (錦之丞). Even before his birth, he was designated to be adopted by Matsudaira Katsuyoshi, the daimyō of Iyo-Matsuyama Domain and this was officially announced on November 25, 1837.

However, on July 27, 1838, Matsudaira Narisawa, the young daimyō of Fukui Domain, died suddenly without an heir. His sister, Asahime (the widow of Narisawa's predecessor), and his brothers, Shōgun Tokugawa Ieyoshi and Tokugawa Nariyoshi, agreed that Kinnojo should become the next daimyō of Fukui. After his genpuku ceremony, he took the name Matsudaira Yoshinaga, having been granted one kanji from Ieyoshi's name. At this time, he was granted the court rank of Senior Fourth Rank, Lower Grade and his courtesy titles were Echizen-no-kami and Sakon'e-no-gonshōjō. On April 6, 1839, he was married to Yu-hime, a daughter of Hosokawa Narimori of Kumamoto Domain.

== As a local ruler ==
In 1839, Yoshinaga began implementation of a fiscal austerity plan in an effort to resolve the perennial financial difficulties of Fukui Domain. He began by cutting the stipends for all of his samurai retainers in half for a three-year period, and also his own expenses for five years. In January 1840, with the discharge of Matsudaira Shume, reformists such as Nakane Yukie, Yuri Kimimasa and Hashimoto Sanai took a leading role in domain politics. Yoshinaga performed innovative work such as establishment of a translation bureau "Yoshō-shūgaku-sho" to acquire rangaku knowledge and spur military modernisation. He built a modern armaments factory, and the Meidōkan han school was nationally recognised. A bussan-shokaijō, or cooperative venture between the domain and wealthy merchants also contributed to the domain's economic recovery. In 1851, he was promoted to Sakon'e-no-gonchūjō and Senior Fourth Rank, Upper Grade.

== Participation in national affairs ==
In 1853, in the aftermath of the Perry Expedition to demand an end to Japan's national isolation policy, at first Yoshinaga joined the anti-foreigner party led by Tokugawa Nariaki (daimyō of Mito Domain) and Shimazu Nariakira (daimyō of Satsuma Domain). However, later he changed his position to opening the country to foreign trading after contact with the rōjū Abe Masahiro.

When the succession problem of 14th Shōgun arose, he delegated his retainer Hashimoto Sanai to Kyoto in support of Tokugawa Yoshinobu, the lord of the Hitotsubashi-Tokugawa family. However, with the appointment of Ii Naosuke to the position of Tairō, Yoshinobu's faction was defeated and Tokugawa Iemochi (of the Kishu-Tokugawa family) became Shōgun. The Ii clan of Hikone Domain and the Echizen-Matsudaira clan of Fukui Domain had had a strong enmity for several generations, and relations between the Tairō worsened further after Ii pushed through the ratification of Treaty of Amity and Commerce between US and Japan without acceptance by Emperor Kōmei. Infuriated, Yoshinaga intruded into Edo castle with Tokugawa Nariaki to protest against Naosuke's actions. On 5 July 1858, he was forced to resign as daimyō of Fukui Domain as part of the Ansei purge. At this time, he took the name "Shungaku".

== During the end of the Tokugawa Shogunate ==
The assassination of Ii Naosuke in the Sakuradamon Incident changed the Shogunate's policy, allowing Matsudaira Shungaku to return to politics in April 1862. He strongly supported the kōbu gattai movement to strengthen relations between the shogunate and the Imperial court. He was appointed to the newly created post of Seiji sōsaishoku, a high-ranking government oversight position and worked with Matsudaira Katamori (daimyō of Aizu Domain), who was appointed Military Commissioner of Kyoto, in charge of security for the Emperor. In 1862, Shungaku formed the Rōshigumi, a group of rōnin organised as a paramilitary militia to help guard Shogun Tokugawa Iemochi on his 1863 trip to Kyoto. He also invited Yokoi Shōnan from Kumamoto Domain as a political consultant, and planned for Shogun Tokugawa Ieshige to relocate to Kyoto. These actions were known as the Bunkyū Renovation after the Japanese era name. In 1863, the Rōshigumi were transformed into the Shinsengumi. Matsudaira Shungaku moved to Kyoto the same year, but the increasing strength of the Sonnō jōi movement led by Chōshū Domain forced him into increasingly unfavourable compromises, and he was forced to resign as Seiji sōsaishoku in disappointment.

Shungaku returned to Fukui, and from June 1863, began preparation to raise an army consisting of all of the samurai of Fukui Domain, which would march on Kyoto and would be led by Matsudaira Mochiaki. Although Satsuma Domain, Kumamoto Domain and Kaga Domain were amenable to the idea and there was no immediate opposition from Emperor Kōmei, his appeals to other domains went unanswered and the shogunate was not supportive, so the proposed coup never took place. Instead, there were increasing acts of assassination against members of the Tokugawa clan by pro-Sonnō jōi rōnin.

After purge of Chōshū Domain by Aizu Domain and Satsuma Domain (the coup of 18 August) and the Kinmon Incident, Matsudaira Shungaku returned to Kyoto in 1864 as a member of the Sanyo Kaigi (参預会議), a short-lived consultative assembly consisting of Tokugawa Yoshinobu, Shimazu Hisamitsu, Date Munenari, Matsudaira Katamori and Yamauchi Yōdō. This congress intended to diminish the power of the Shogunate and establish a council system of government by the Imperial Court together with select major domains. Meetings were held eight times at Shungaku's residence, and discussions were held on the opening of Hyogo (Kobe) Port to other nations and on how to respond to the threat posed by Chōshū Domain. The system did not function well because of conflicts between the members, especially the personal enmity between Shimazu Hisamitsu and Tokugawa Yoshinobu. On 22 March 1864, Shungaku replaced Matsudaira Katamori as Military Commissioner of Kyoto, but he resigned on 7 April.

In October 1867, Yoshinobu resigned as shōgun, returning political power to the Imperial court, but tried to maintain Tokugawa hegemony as the most powerful of the feudal lords. In the subsequent Boshin War, Shungaku acted as an intermediary until the final surrender of the pro-Tokugawa forces in 1869. In 1868, his court rank was elevated to Junior Second Rank, and his courtesy title to Gon-Chūnagon. His court rank became Senior Second Rank in 1869.

== After Meiji restoration ==
In the new Meiji government Shungaku served in a number of cabinet-equivalent posts, including Chief Executive of Internal Affairs, but soon resigned all posts in protest at the domination of the Meiji government by members of the former Chōshū and Satsuma domains.

In 1870, Shungaku invited William Elliot Griffis to Japan as an oyatoi gaikokujin to teach in Fukui.

Together with Ikeda Mochimasa and Date Munenari, he helped write the Tokugawa reiten roku, a compilation of records of Tokugawa shogunate ritual protocol, in 1881. He was also awarded the Order of the Rising Sun, second class in 1881 and his court rank was raised to Junior First Rank in 1888. He was awarded the Order of the Rising Sun, first class in 1889.

Shungaku died aged 63 in 1890. His death poem is "Even if I become one of countless souls, I would soar up to heaven and protect the Emperor's reign for our nation (Naki-kazu-ni/Yoshiya-iru-tomo/Amakakeri/Miyo-wo-Mamoramu/Sume-kuni-no-tame)". His tomb is located in the temple Kaian-ji in Shinagawa, Tokyo.

== Family ==
- Father: Tokugawa Narimasa
- Mother: Orin no Kata (1796-1871)
- Wife: Yu-hime (1834-1887, daughter of Hosokawa Narimori of Kumamoto Domain
- Children:
  - Yasuhime (1860-1865)
- Concubine: Oman
- Children:
  - Sadahima (1865-1866)
  - Seihime (1867)
- Concubine (name unknown)
- Children
  - Sakihime (1872)
  - Rokunosuke (1873)
  - Kōtai (1875)
- Concubine: Fujita (1855-1925)
  - Setsuhime (1876-1936), married Matsudaira Yasutaka
  - Satōhime (1878-1955), married Tokugawa Atsushi
  - Masahime (1879-1940), married Mōri Gorō
  - Chiyōhime (1881-1952), married Sanjō Kimiyoshi
  - Matsudaira Yoshitami (1882-1948)
  - Tokugawa Yoshichika (1886-1976), head of the Owari-Tokugawa clan

== Episodes ==
- Yoshinaga wrote letters inscribed on "Bunkyu-Eihou" coin minted at end of Shogunate.
- Yoshinaga named the regnal year "Meiji".
- Yoshinaga is seen as one of the "Four Wise Lords at the end of Shogunate" together with Shimazu Nariakira (Lord of Satsuma), Yamauchi Toyonobu (Lord of Tosa), and Date Munenari (Lord of Uwajima). But he himself later said "The real Wise Lord was Shimazu Nariakira only, and even Mito Lords, Yamaushi Yodo, Nabeshima Naotada and of course I cannot even come close to him."
- Yoshinaga is created with planting the first western-style apples in Japan at the clan's residence in Sugamo, Tokyo

== See also ==
- Fukui Prefectural Fujishima High School
- William Elliot Griffis

Preceded by Matsudaira Narisawa	17th Daimyō of Fukui; 1838–1858	Succeeded by Matsudaira Mochiaki
