= Tokugawa Nariharu =

Japanese daimyō

Tokugawa Nariharu (徳川 斉温, May 29, 1819 – March 20, 1839) was a Japanese daimyō of the Edo period, who became the 11th lord of the Owari Domain in Nagoya in 1827. (Note: His actual death date was March 26, 1839, but was changed to March 20 by decree on November 22, 1839.) The 19th son of shōgun Tokugawa Ienari, he was adopted by Tokugawa Naritomo.

His childhood name was Naoshichiro (直七郎).

== Family ==
- Father: Tokugawa Ienari
- Mother: Ohana no Kata (?-1845) later Seiren'in
- Wives:
  - Aihime later Shunjoin, daughter of Tokugawa Narimasa
  - Fukuko later Kirein, daughter of Konoe Motosaki

== Notes ==
Preceded by Tokugawa Naritomo	11th (Tokugawa) daimyō of Owari; 1827–1839	Succeeded by Tokugawa Naritaka
