= Tokugawa Yoshitsugu =

Japanese daimyō

Tokugawa Yoshitsugu (徳川 慶臧; July 28, 1836 – April 29, 1849) was a Japanese daimyō of the Edo period, who ruled the Owari Domain. He was son of Tokugawa Narimasa with his concubine, Oren no Kata (1796-1871). His childhood name was Kanmaru (鑑丸).

Preceded by Tokugawa Naritaka	13th (Tokugawa) daimyō of Owari; 1845–1849	Succeeded by Tokugawa Yoshikumi
