= Tokugawa Mochinaga =

Japanese samurai

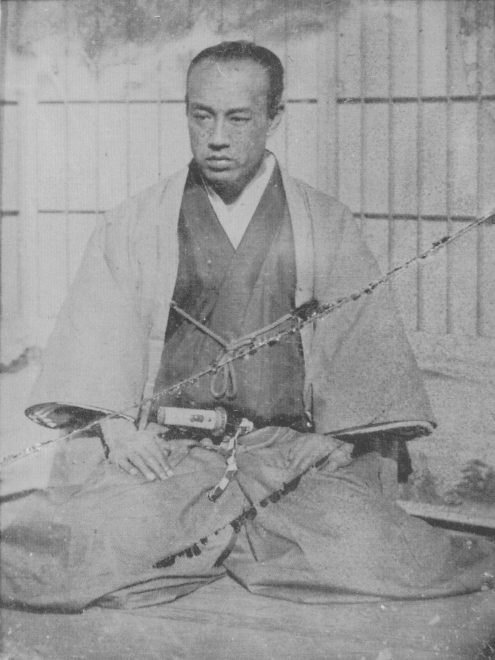
- Mochinaga in 1863

Lord of the Hitotsubashi-Tokugawa
- In office 1866–1884
- Preceded by: Tokugawa Yoshinobu
- Succeeded by: Tokugawa Satomichi

Personal details
- Born: June 11, 1831 Edo, Japan
- Died: March 6, 1884 (aged 52)

Tokugawa Mochinaga (徳川 茂徳; June 11, 1831 – March 6, 1884) was a Japanese samurai who was an influential figure of the Bakumatsu period. His childhood name was Chinzaburo (鎮三郎).

== Biography ==
The son of Matsudaira Yoshitatsu of Takasu han, his brothers included the famous Matsudaira Katamori, Matsudaira Sadaaki, and Tokugawa Yoshikatsu. Together, the four men were known as the Takasu yon-kyōdai 高須四兄弟, or "Four Brothers of Takasu". First serving as daimyō of his native Takasu Domain, and then the Owari Domain, Mochiharu retired before succeeding to the headship of the Hitotsubashi branch of the Tokugawa house. An important figure in the Bakumatsu period, he eventually retired the Hitotsubashi headship in favor of his son Satomichi.

== Family ==
- Father: Matsudaira Yoshitatsu (1800-1862)
- Mother: Norihime, daughter of Tokugawa Harutoshi
- Wife: Masahime, daughter of Niwa Nagatomi
- Children:
  - Matsudaira Yoshimasa (1858-1860) by Masahime
  - Tokugawa Satomichi by Masahime

Japanese royalty
Preceded by Matsudaira Yoshitatsu	11th (Owari-Matsudaira) daimyō of Takasu; 1850–1858	Succeeded by Matsudaira Yoshimasa
Preceded by Tokugawa Yoshikatsu	15th (Tokugawa) daimyō of Owari; 1858–1863	Succeeded by Tokugawa Yoshinori
Preceded by Tokugawa Yoshinobu	10th Hitotsubashi-Tokugawa family head 1866–1884	Succeeded by Tokugawa Satomichi
