= Owari Domain =

Japanese historical estate

Nagoya Domain (1871) 名古屋藩 Owari Domain (1610–1871) 尾張藩 尾張藩
- Domain of Japan
- 1600–1871
- Flag Mon of the Tokugawa clan

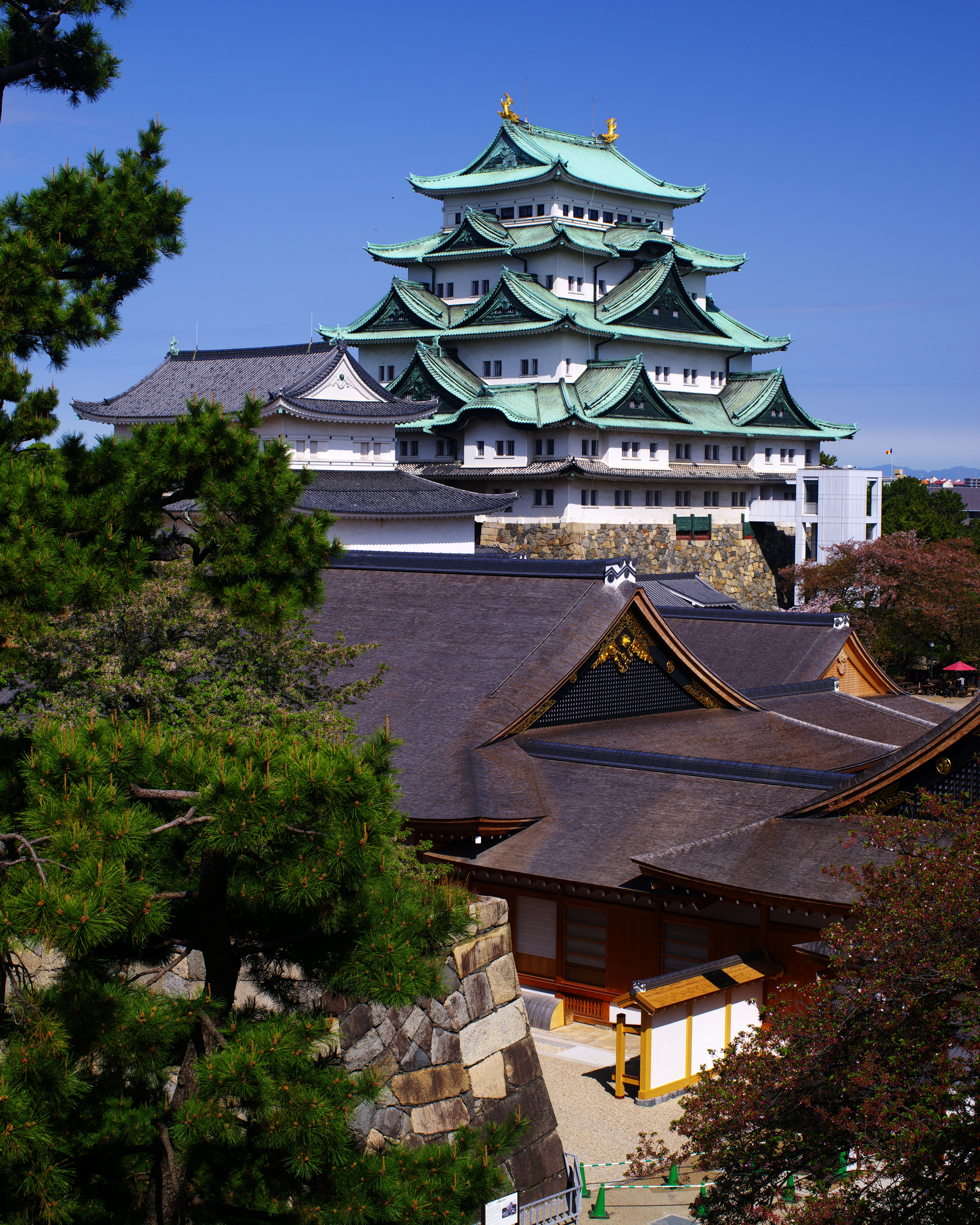
- Southeast corner of Nagoya Castle
- Capital: Nagoya
- Government
  - Type: Daimyō
- Daimyō
  - 1607–1650: Tokugawa Yoshinao (first)
  - 1869–1871: Tokugawa Yoshikatsu (last)
- Historical era: Edo period Meiji period
  - Established: 1600
  - Disestablished: 1871
- Today part of: Aichi Prefecture

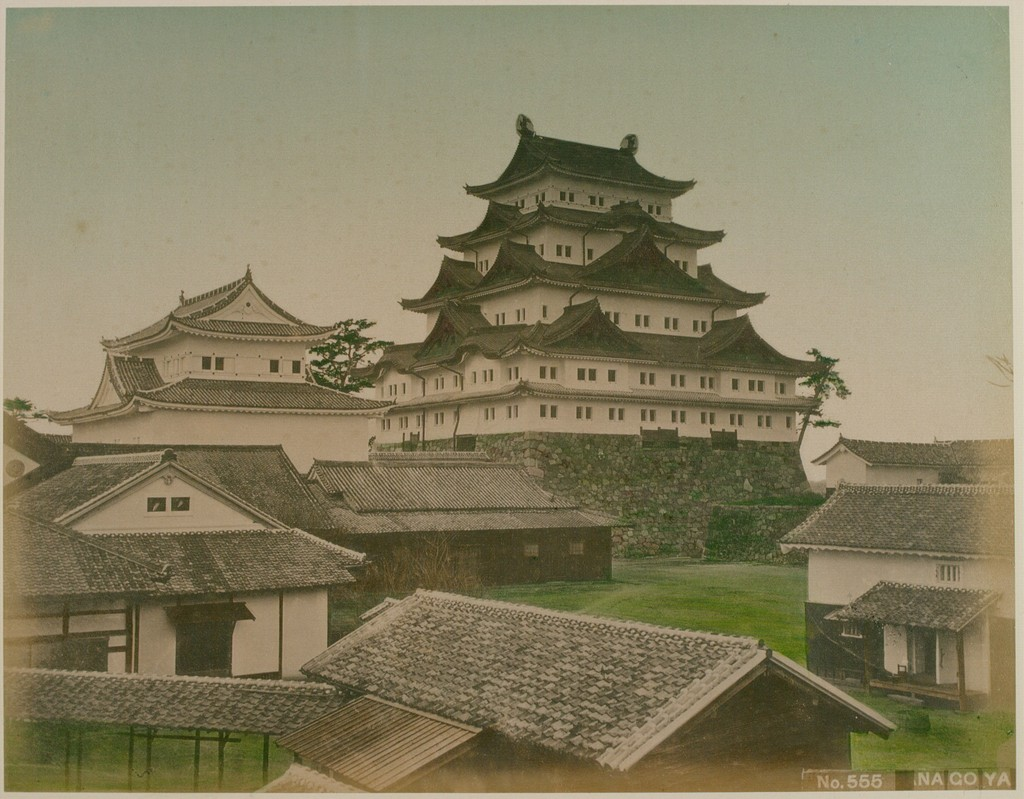
Nagoya Castle was the administrative seat of the Owari Domain

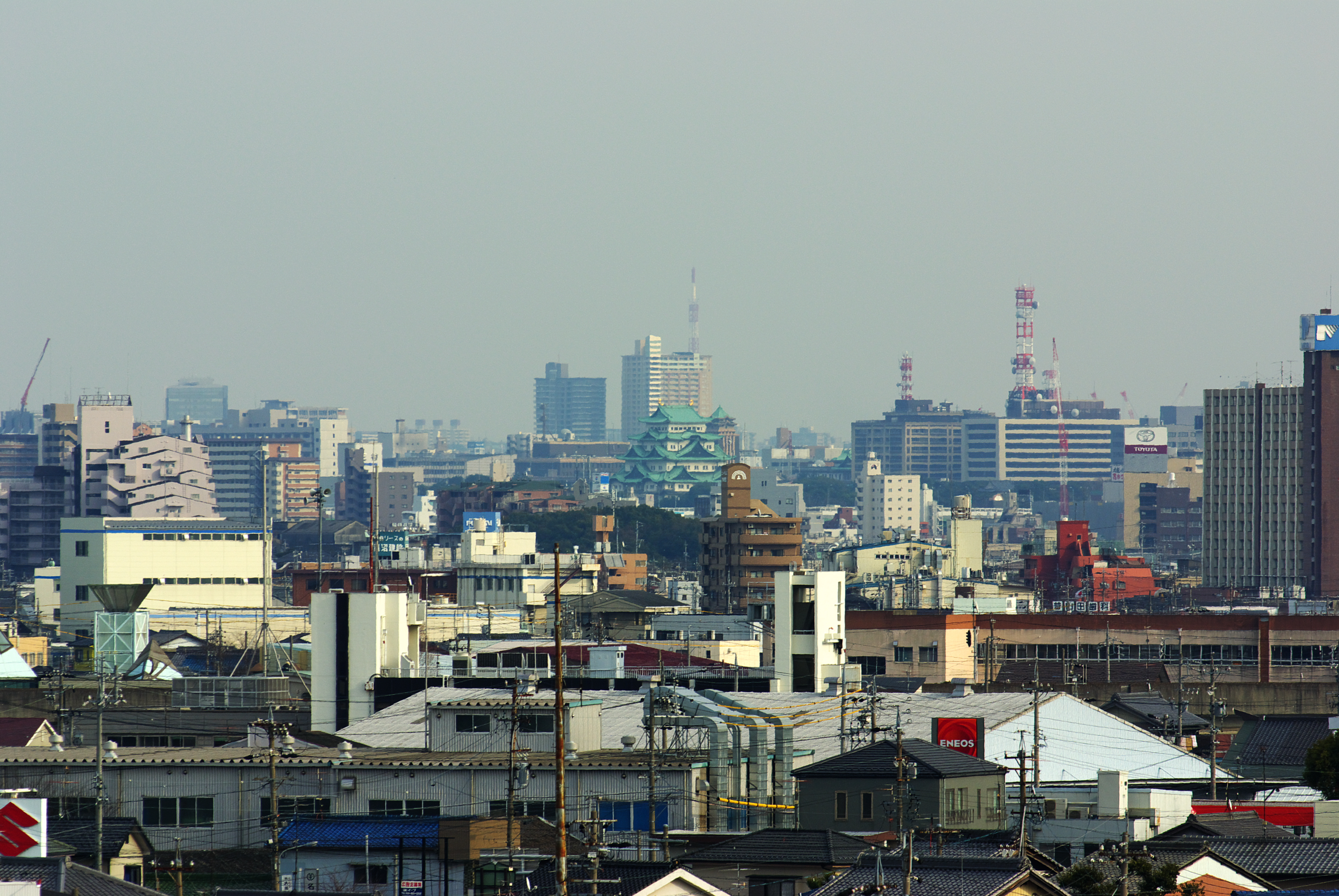
In the modern era, there is a distinct feeling of separation that can be observed in Kiyosu. This is particularly evident when looking at the view of Nagoya Castle from the mock tower of Kiyosu Castle, as captured in a photograph taken in February 2009

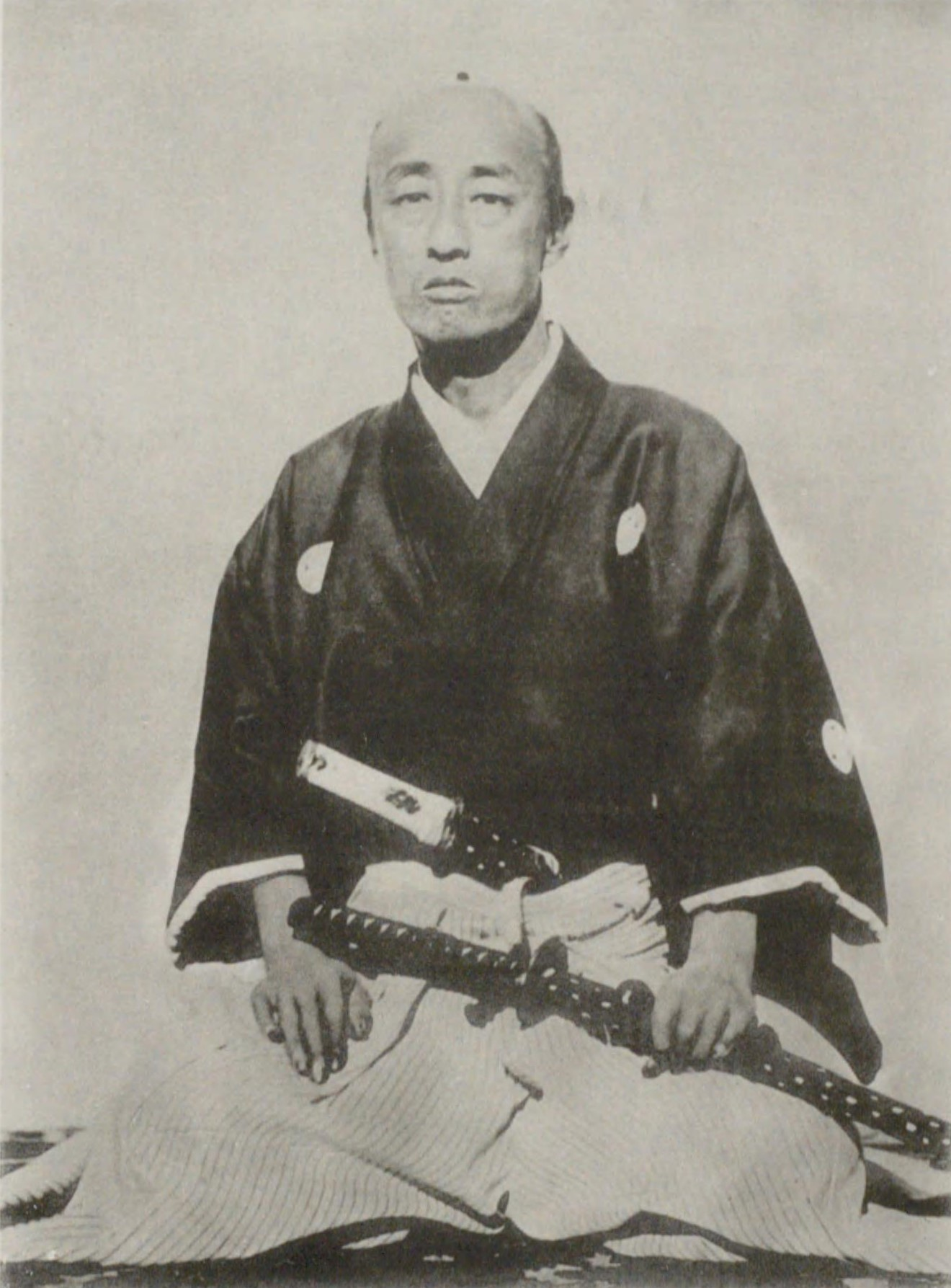
Tokugawa Yoshikatsu, final daimyo of Owari Domain

The Owari-Han, also known as the Owari Domain, was a significant feudal domain in Japan during the Edo period. Situated in the western region of what is now Aichi Prefecture, it covered portions of Owari, Mino, and Shinano provinces, with its central administration based at Nagoya Castle. At its zenith, the Owari Domain boasted an impressive rating of 619,500 koku, making it the largest landholding of the Tokugawa clan outside of the shogunal territories. The ruling clan of the Owari Domain was the Tokugawa clan, holding the prestigious position of the highest rank among the gosanke. Additionally, the domain was sometimes referred to as the Nagoya Domain due to its association with Nagoya Castle.

== History ==
Owari was initially ruled by Fukushima Masanori with 240,000 koku until the Battle of Sekigahara in September 1600. After his military achievements, he was reassigned to the Hiroshima Domain. Matsudaira Tadayoshi, the fourth son of Tokugawa Ieyasu, took control of the Kiyosue Domain with 520,000 koku after Fukushima's departure. Tadayoshi died in 1607 without an heir, leading the territory to become Tenryo.Tokugawa Yoshinao, Ieyasu's ninth son, arrived from the Kai-Kofu Domain with 472,344 koku and established a clan in Owari, expanding the domain over time. By 1619, the domain had grown to 563,206 koku, with an additional 50,000 koku added in 1671 to assert its position as one of the top three families. The total koku reached 619,500, encompassing territories in Mino, Mikawa, Shinano, Omi, and Settsu. Despite officially having just under 620,000 koku, efforts to cultivate new fields led to an estimated actual koku of nearly 1 million, showcasing the domain's prosperity under Tokugawa Yoshinao's leadership. The first lord of the domain, Yoshinao Tokugawa, was still a child when he took office, so the early administration of the domain was carried out by Ieyasu's old retainers, but after he grew up, Yoshinao himself took charge of water supply, new rice field development, and annual taxes in order to increase rice production. He worked to establish the system and established the domain government. Tokugawa Yoshinao, the initial ruler of the territory, took on the responsibilities of managing the water supply, developing new rice fields, and handling taxes to boost rice production and establish the domain's administrative structure. Tokugawa Mitsutomo, the second lord, focused on policies related to temples and shrines, but excessive reconstruction led to financial instability. Fiscal reforms were implemented, but natural disasters further weakened the domain's finances. Tokugawa Tsunamasa, the third lord, had a strong connection to the Shogun through his mother, contributing to the expansion and diversification of the Tokugawa clan's influence and power. After the restoration of imperial rule, oshikatsu played a crucial role in urging Tokugawa Yoshinobu to resign. He aligned himself with the new government during the Battle of Toba-Fushimi and actively suppressed the Sabaku faction during the Aomatsuba Incident. Yoshikatsu Tokugawa, former feudal lord, was appointed leader of the Tokaido clans by the Meiji government after the Battle of Toba-Fushimi. He oversaw the Tokaido fudai clans and sent envoys to neutralize Kokugaku groups to facilitate the passage of new government forces. In 1870, Yoshikatsu absorbed the financially troubled Takasu Domain to strengthen its stability. On July 14, 1871, the domain was abolished and transformed into Nagoya Prefecture, which later merged with Inuyama Prefecture to become Aichi Prefecture. It further merged with Nukata Prefecture to form present-day Aichi Prefecture.

== List of daimyo ==
Owari Tokugawa family, 1600–1871 (Fudai daimyo)
#	Name	Tenure	Courtesy title	Court Rank	kokudaka
1	Tokugawa Yoshinao (徳川義直)	1607–1650	Uhyoe no kami (右兵衛神)	Junior 4th Rank Lower Grade (従四位下)	619,500 koku
2	Tokugawa Mitsutomo (徳川光友)	1650–1693	Gon Dainagon (権大納言)	Junior 4th Rank Lower Grade (従四位下)	619,500 koku
3	Tokugawa Tsunanari (徳川綱誠)	1693–1699	Chunagon Jusanmi (中納言従三位)	Junior 4th Rank Lower Grade (従四位下)	619,500 koku
4	Tokugawa Yoshimichi (徳川吉通)	1699–1713	Chunagon Jusanmi (中納言従三位)	Junior 4th Rank Lower Grade (従四位下)	619,500 koku
5	Tokugawa Gorōta (徳川五郎太)	1713	none	Junior 3rd Rank Lower Grade (従三位下)	619,500 koku
6	Tokugawa Tsugutomo (徳川継友)	1713–1730	Chunagon Jusanmi (中納言従三位)	Junior 4th Rank Lower Grade (従四位下)	619,500 koku
7	Tokugawa Muneharu (徳川宗春)	1730–1739	Chunagon Jusanmi (中納言従三位)	Junior 4th Rank Lower Grade (従四位下)	619,500 koku
8	Tokugawa Munekatsu (徳川宗勝)	1739–1761	Chunagon Jusanmi (中納言従三位)	Junior 4th Rank Lower Grade (従四位下)	619,500 koku
9	Tokugawa Munechika (徳川宗睦)	1761–1799	Gon Dainagon (権大納言)	Junior 4th Rank Lower Grade (従四位下)	619,500 koku
10	Tokugawa Naritomo (徳川斉朝)	1799–1827	Gyogon Dainagon (行厳大納言)	Junior 4th Rank Lower Grade (従四位下)	619,500 koku
11	Tokugawa Nariharu (徳川斉温)	1827–1839	Gon Dainagon (権大納言)	Junior 4th Rank Lower Grade (従四位下)	619,500 koku
12	Tokugawa Naritaka (徳川斉荘)	1839–1845	Gon Dainagon (権大納言)	Junior 4th Rank Lower Grade (従四位下)	619,500 koku
13	Tokugawa Yoshitsugu (徳川慶臧)	1845–1849	none	Junior 4th Rank Lower Grade (従四位下)	619,500 koku
14	Tokugawa Yoshikumi (徳川慶恕)	1849–1858	Chunagon Jusanmi (中納言従三位)	Junior 4th Rank Lower Grade (従四位下)	619,500 koku
15	Tokugawa Mochinaga (徳川茂徳)	1858–1863	Gon Dainagon (権大納言)	Junior 4th Rank Lower Grade (従四位下)	619,500 koku
16	Tokugawa Yoshinori (徳川義宜)	1863–1869	Konoe, Kon no Chujo (近衛、今中将)	Junior 4th Rank Lower Grade (従四位下)	619,500 koku
17	Tokugawa Yoshikatsu (徳川慶恕)	1869–1871	Chunagon Jusanmi (中納言従三位)	Junior 4th Rank Lower Grade (従四位下)	619,500 koku

== Sub-domains ==
The Owari Domain was supported by the Yanagawa Domain in Mutsu Province and the Takasu Domain in Mino Province.

=== Yanagawa Domain ===
Yanagawa Domain (柳河藩, Yanagawa-han) was a feudal domain under the Tokugawa shogunate of Edo period Japan, in what is now eastern Fukuoka Prefecture. It was centered around Yanagawa Castle in what is now the city of Yanagawa, Fukuoka and was ruled by the tozama daimyō Tachibana clan for much of its history.

The Yanagawa Domain provided 30,000 koku to the Owari Domain annually from 1683 to 1730, when Tokugawa Muneharu came to power and dissolved the domain.

Tachibana clan, 1620–1871 (Tozama daimyō)
#	Name	Tenure	Courtesy title	Court Rank	kokudaka
1	Tachibana Muneshige (立花宗茂)	1620–1638	Sakon'e-no-shōgen (左近将監)	Junior 4th Rank, Lower Grade (従四位下)	109,000 koku
2	Tachibana Tadashige (立花忠重)	1638–1664	Sakon'e-no-shōgen (左近将監)	Junior 4th Rank, Lower Grade (従四位下)	109,000 koku
3	Tachibana Akitora (立花秋虎)	1664–1696	Sakon'e-no-shōgen (左近将監)	Junior 4th Rank, Lower Grade (従四位下)	109,000 koku
4	Tachibana Akitaka (立花明隆)	1696–1721	Hida-no-kami(飛騨守)	Junior 4th Rank, Lower Grade (従五位下)	109,000 koku
5	Tachibana Sadayoshi (立花貞俶)	1721–1744	Hida-no-kami(飛騨守)	Junior 4th Rank, Lower Grade (従五位下)	109,000 koku
6	Tachibana Sadanori (立花貞則)	1744–1746	Hida-no-kami(飛騨守)	Junior 4th Rank, Lower Grade (従五位下)	109,000 koku
7	Tachibana Akinao (立花鑑通)	1746–1797	Ukyō-no-daibu(左京大夫)	Junior 4th Rank, Lower Grade (従五位下)	109,000 koku
8	Tachibana Akihisa (立花鑑寿)	1797–1820	Sakon'e-no-shōgen (左近将監)	Junior 4th Rank, Lower Grade (従四位下)	109,000 koku
9	Tachibana Akikata (立花鑑賢)	1820–1830	Sakon'e-no-shōgen (左近将監)	Junior 4th Rank, Lower Grade (従四位下)	109,000 koku
10	Tachibana Akihiro (立花鑑広)	1830–1833	-None-	Junior 5th Rank, Lower Grade (従五位下)	109,000 koku
11	Tachibana Akinobu (立花鑑備)	1833–1845	Sakon'e-no-shōgen (左近将監)	Junior 4th Rank, Lower Grade (従四位下)	109,000 koku
12	Tachibana Akitomo (立花鑑寛)	1845–1871	Sakon'e-no-shōgen (左近将監)	Junior 4th Rank, Lower Grade (従四位下)	109,000 ->114,000 koku

=== Takasu Domain ===
The Takasu Domain (高須藩, Takasu-han) was a Japanese domain located in Mino Province (present-day Kaizu, Gifu). For most of its history, it was ruled by the Takasu-Matsudaira, a branch of the Tokugawa clan of Owari Domain.

Matsudaira Katamori, Matsudaira Sadaaki, Tokugawa Yoshikatsu, and Tokugawa Mochinaga, four important figures in Bakumatsu-era Japan, were the sons of Matsudaira Yoshitatsu, one of Takasu's last daimyō. The Takasu Domain also provided 30,000 koku to the Owari Domain annually from 1700 to 1870, when it was merged with the Owari Domain.

Matsudaira clan/Tokugawa clan (Shinpan) 1700–1870
#	Name	Tenure	Courtesy title	Court Rank	kokudaka
1	Matsudaira Yoshiyuki (松平義行)	1700–1715	Settsu-no-kami (摂津守)	Junior 5th Rank, Lower Grade (従五位下)	30,000 koku
2	Matsudaira Yoshitaka (松平義孝)	1715–1732	Settsu-no-kami (摂津守)	Junior 4th Rank, Lower Grade (従四位下)	30,000 koku
3	Matsudaira Yoshiatsu (松平義淳)	1732–1739	Sakonoe-shosho (左近衛少将)	Junior 4th Rank, Lower Grade (従四位下)	30,000 koku
4	Matsudaira Yoshitoshi (松平義敏)	1739–1771	Nakatsukasa no-daiyu (中務大輔)	Junior 4th Rank, Lower Grade (従四位下)	30,000 koku
5	Matsudaira Yoshitomo (松平義柄)	1771–1777	Settsu-no-kami (摂津守); Jijū (侍従)	Junior 4th Rank, Lower Grade (従四位下)	30,000 koku
6	Matsudaita Yoshihiro (松平 義裕)	1777–1795	Settsu-no-kami (摂津守); Jijū (侍従)	Junior 4th Rank, Lower Grade (従四位下)	30,000 koku
7	Matsudaira Yoshimasa ([松平義当)	1795–1801	Danjo-hitsu (弾正大弼)	Junior 4th Rank, Lower Grade (従四位下)	30,000 koku
8	Matsudaira Yoshisue (松平義居)	1801–1804	Sakonoe-shosho (左少将)；Jijū (侍従)	Junior 4th Rank, Lower Grade (従四位下)	30,000 koku
9	Matsudaira Yoshinari (松平義和)	1804–1832	Sakonoe-shosho (左少将)	Junior 4th Rank, Lower Grade (従四位下)	30,000 koku
10	Matsudaira Yoshitatsu (松平義建)	1832–1850	Sakonoe-shosho (左少将)	Junior 4th Rank, Lower Grade (従四位下)	30,000 koku
11	Tokugawa Chikanaga (徳川茂徳)	1850–1858	Sakonoe-shosho (左少将)	Junior 4th Rank, Lower Grade (従四位下)	30,000 koku
12	Matsudaira Yoshimasa (松平義端)	1858–1860	– none –	– none –	30,000 koku
13	Matsudaira Yoshitake (松平義勇)	1860–1869	– none –	Junior 5th Rank Lower Grade, (従五位)	30,000 koku
14	Matsudaira Yoshinari (松平義生)	1869–1870	none –	– none –	30,000 koku

== See also ==
- Han system
- List of Han
