= Aoi Oshitayashiki =

Former villa and garden estate of the Owari Tokugawa family

Coordinates: 35.172589814982906°N 136.92052612423413°E

- 葵御下屋敷 (Japanese)
- Interactive map of Aoi Oshitayashiki
- Type: Daimyō villa and garden estate
- Associated with: Owari Tokugawa family
- Location: Aoi 1-chōme, Higashi-ku, Nagoya, Japan

History
- Built: 1679
- Built for: Tokugawa Mitsutomo
- Demolished: Meiji era
- Abandoned: Meiji era

Site notes
- Owner: Owari Domain

Aoi Oshitayashiki (Japanese: 葵御下屋敷) was a detached villa, garden estate, and retreat of the Owari Tokugawa family, the ruling house of the Owari Domain, located in what is now Aoi 1-chōme and parts of Daikan-chō in Higashi-ku, Nagoya, central Japan. The estate was established in 1679 by Tokugawa Mitsutomo, the second lord of Owari Domain.

One of the largest Tokugawa estates in Nagoya outside Nagoya Castle, the property contained residential buildings, landscaped gardens, ponds, medicinal gardens, and later ceramic kilns used for the production of Kinjō Higashiyama ware.

== History ==
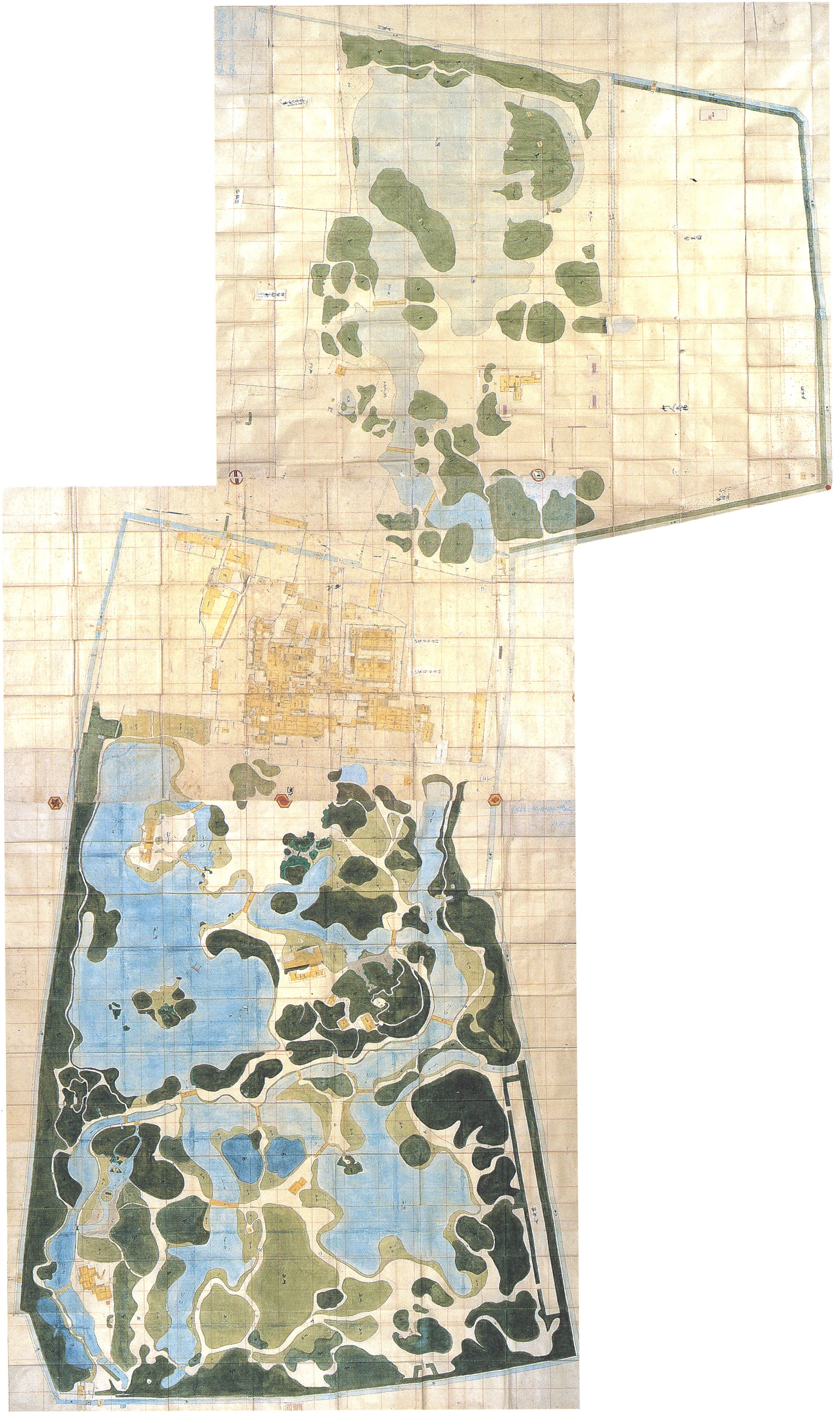
Edo-period map of the Aoi Oshitayashiki

The estate was established in Enpō 7 (1679) by Tokugawa Mitsutomo as a suburban villa removed from the official seat of government at Nagoya Castle. Historical descriptions indicate that the grounds covered approximately 64,000 tsubo (about 21 hectares), making it one of the largest private estates in the castle town.

The central portion of the estate contained the residential palace while extensive landscaped gardens and ponds occupied much of the surrounding grounds. Successive generations of the Owari Tokugawa family enlarged and modified the property over the course of the Edo period.

A specialized medicinal herb garden was later established in the northwestern section of the estate., based on the grant to the domain in Shōhō 2 (1645) alongside the one at Nagoya Castle. The garden cultivated medicinal plants, including ginseng, under the patronage of the lords of Owari Domain.

The estate became particularly associated with Tokugawa Muneharu (1696–1764), the seventh lord of Owari Domain. Local historical traditions connect the property with the period of Muneharu's confinement following his political downfall.

The estate suffered major damage in a fire in Tenmei 2 (1782). Although parts of the villa and gardens were rebuilt, the property gradually declined from its peak scale and importance.

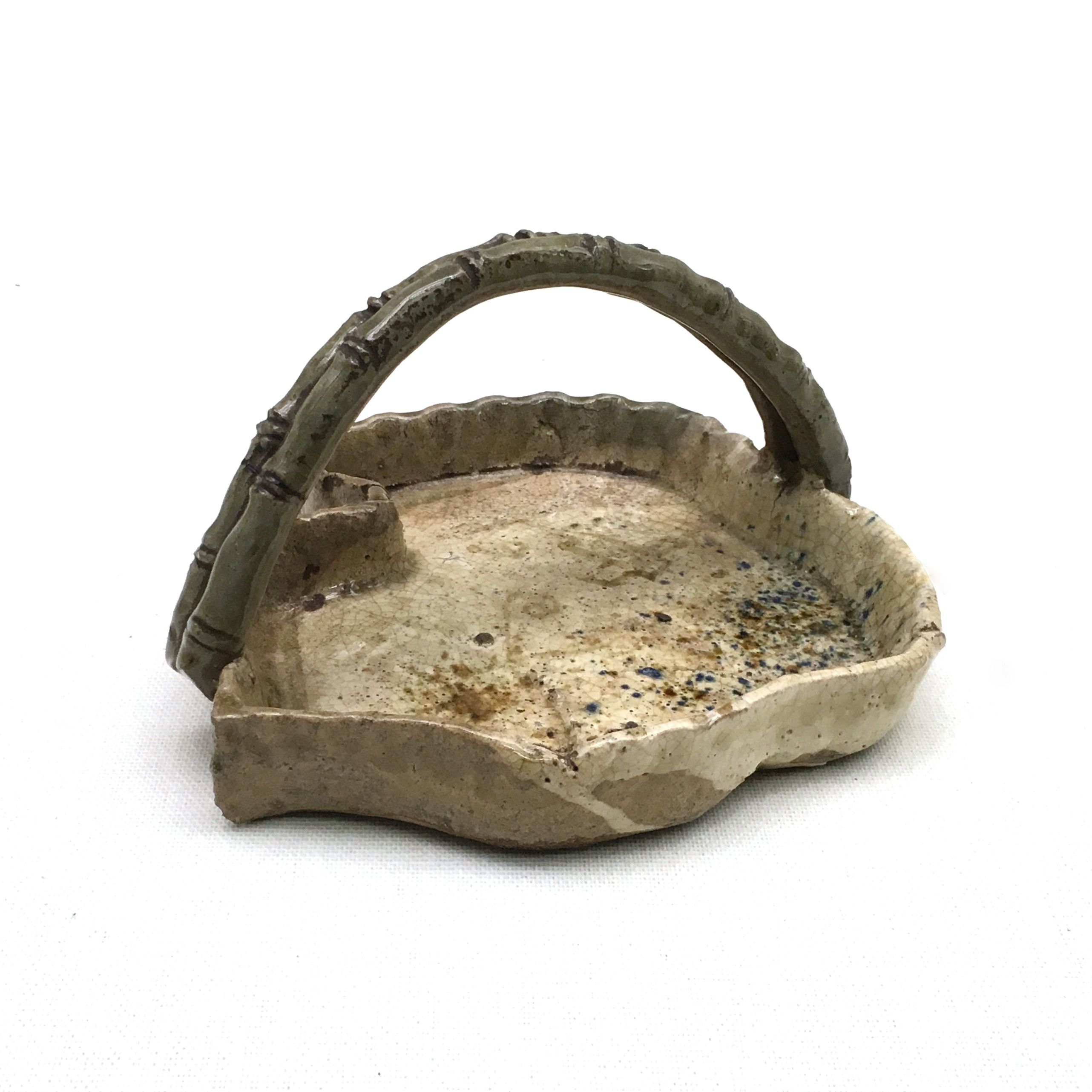
Kinjō Higashiyama ware leaf-shaped bowl, late Edo period

During the Tenpō era, Tokugawa Naritaka (1810–1845), the twelfth lord of Owari Domain, established a climbing kiln (noborigama) within the grounds. The kiln produced Kinjō Higashiyama ware (金城東山焼), a form of oniwa-yaki ("garden ware") manufactured under direct feudal patronage rather than for general commercial sale.

Following the Meiji Restoration, the buildings of the estate were dismantled and the land gradually subdivided and redeveloped. Urban expansion transformed the former grounds into residential and commercial neighborhoods within modern Nagoya.

No original structures survive. The former location of the estate is marked by a historical plaque erected by the City of Nagoya next to the Nagoya City Performing Arts Center, and local preservation organizations.

The nearby temple Muryōju-in (無量寿院) remains associated with the historical memory of Tokugawa Muneharu and the Owari Tokugawa family.

Today the site lies near Shinsakae-machi Station in central Nagoya and forms part of the historical landscape of the former Owari castle town. The Yamazaki Mazak Museum of Art is located in the former area.

== See also ==
- List of Owari Tokugawa residences
- Ōzone Oshitayashiki
- Sankei-en and Rinshunkaku in Yokohama

== Literature ==
- 東区の歴史編さん会. 東区の歴史. 愛知県郷土資料刊行会, 1996.
- 名古屋市. 名古屋市史 第8巻 地理編. 愛知県郷土資料刊行会, 1980.
- 名古屋市. 名古屋市史 第9巻 地図編. 愛知県郷土資料刊行会, 1980.
- 徳川美術館編. 尾張の殿様物語. 徳川美術館, 2007.
- 名古屋市博物館. 名古屋城下お調べ帳. 名古屋市博物館, 2013.
