= Ofukei ware =

Type of Japanese pottery

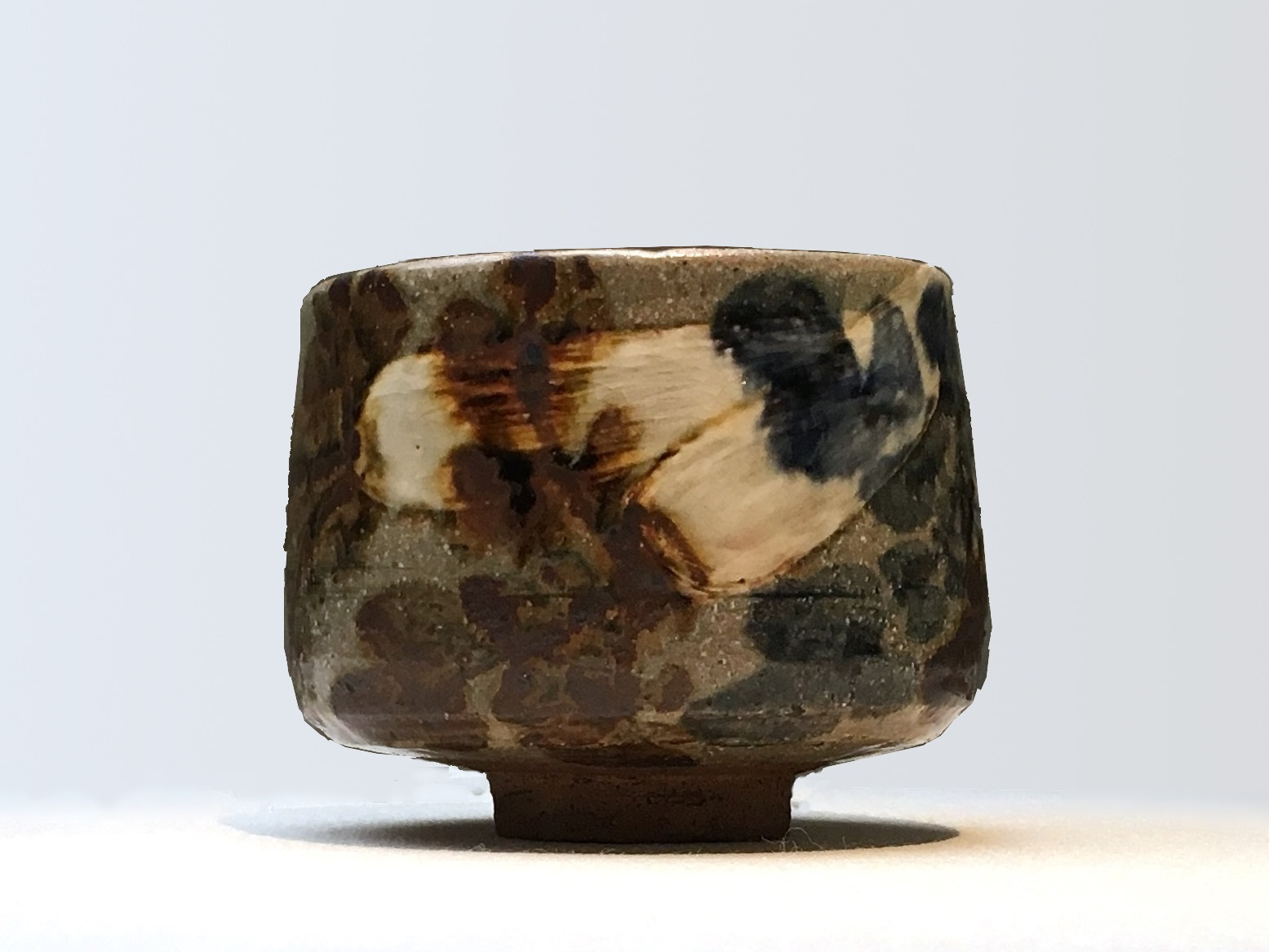
Ofukei earthenware chawan, white slip, decoration painted in blue and brown under a transparent glaze, with elements of the Ogata Kenzan style. Edo period, first half of 19th century. The box has comments by Urasenke 11th generation iemoto Gengensai (玄々斎)

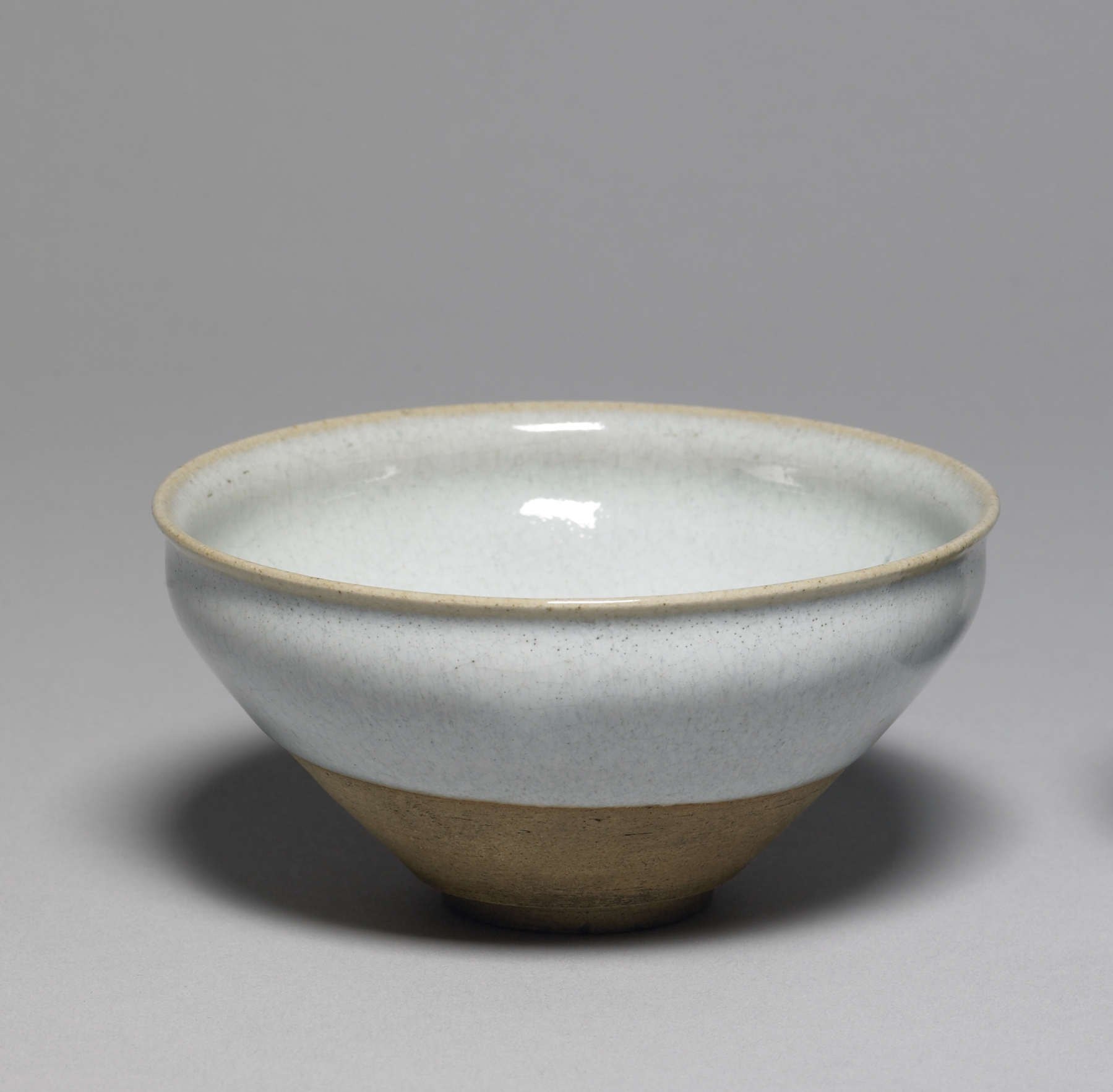
White Ofuke ware bowl, medium stoneware with rice-straw ash glaze. Edo period, between 1700–1850

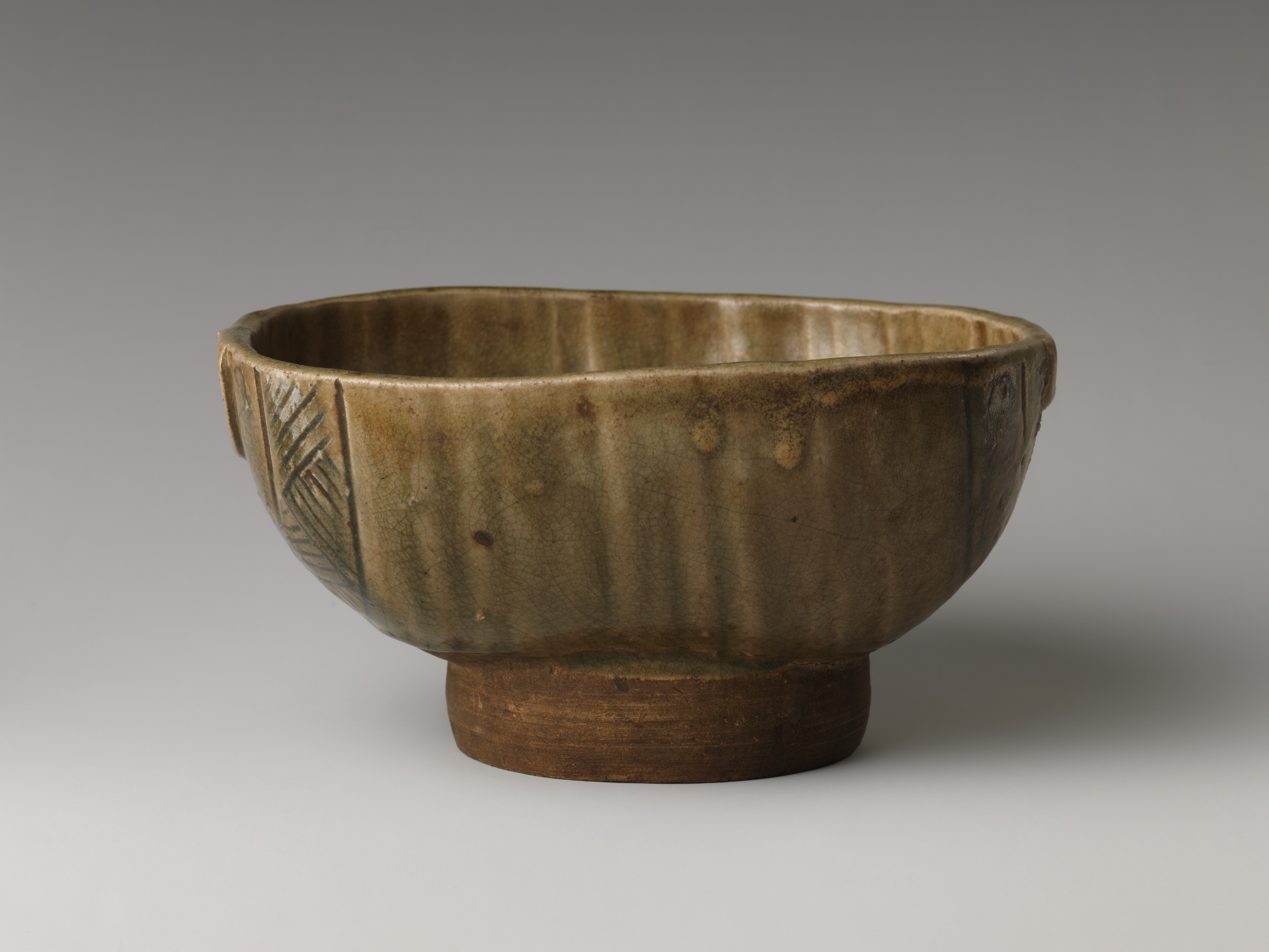
Deep bowl clay covered with a transparent crackled glaze over incised decoration (Mino ware, Ofuke type), by Shuntai (1799-1878)

Ofukei ware (御深井焼, Ofukei-yaki), also spelled Ofuke, refers to a type of Japanese pottery that was originally produced in Nagoya, central Japan.

== History ==
During the Kan'ei era (1624–44), the first lord of Owari Tokugawa Yoshinao (1601–1650) had a kiln constructed at the corner of the Ofuke garden (Ofuke-niwa 御深井庭 or Ofuke-oniwa 御深井御庭) in the northern part of the grounds of Nagoya Castle in what is today Meijō Park. This type was called oniwa-yaki (御庭焼 literally "garden ware"). Almost every feudal lord had his own oniwa-yaki, also to have gifts made. Potters from Seto were invited to make pottery. Ofukei ware therefore has links to Seto ware. Production started around 1670 and was under the patronage of the Owari Tokugawa lords.

Production initially focused on tea caddies (cha-ire), and tea bowls. The wares that came from the castle kiln were generally produced for the lords for their own use or as gifts. The lord’s taste in ceramics was also imitated by other Owari samurai, such as Hirasawa Kurō and Masaki Sōzaburō, who made their own pieces.

Ofukei ware however was also produced at a number of Mino ware kilns. During the rule of the second lord Tokugawa Mitsutomo (1625–1700), the production of the kiln had stopped, but under the 10th lord Tokugawa Naritomo (1793–1850) it restarted around 1800. The production finally ceased with the end of feudalism in the Meiji era of the later half of the 19th century. Another pottery that was produced under the reign of the 12th lord Tokugawa Naritaka (1810–1845) was Kinjō Higashiyama ware and Hagiyama ware.

Ofuke ware is burned with the use of feldspar minerals and shows a transparent ash glaze. Wares came in all sorts of shapes and sizes.

A cluster of pottery artisans in Seto crafts similar wares, distinguished under the name Ofukeyu.

== See also ==
During the time of the production of Ofukei, in the town itself Toyoraku ware and Sasashima ware were made, mostly for tea utensils.

Other pottery from Nagoya and the wider Owari region:

- Kawana ware
- Tokoname ware
- Inuyama ware
