= Kinjō Higashiyama ware =

Type of Japanese pottery

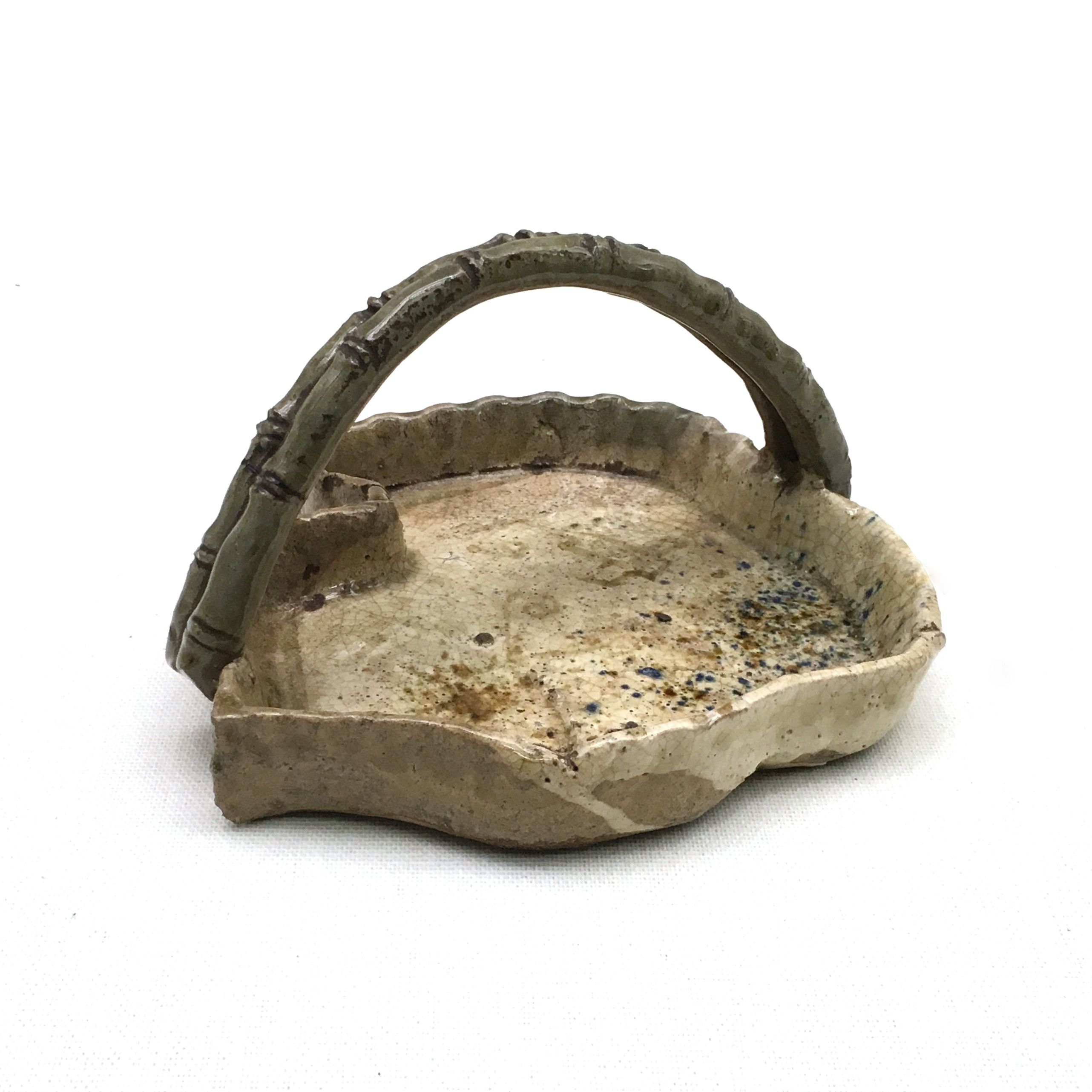
Kinjō Higashiyama ware leaf-shaped bowl, late Edo period

Kinjō Higashiyama ware (金城東山焼) refers to a type of Japanese pottery that was originally produced in Nagoya, central Japan. It was originally called just Higashiyama ware (東山焼) but in order to avoid confusion with other pottery of the same name and kanji spelling the name Kinjō ("Golden Castle", another name for Nagoya Castle) is added before.

The climbing kiln was built for the 12th lord of the Owari Domain, Tokugawa Naritaka (1810–1845), who had a keen interest in pottery, at his lower residence Aoi Oshitayashiki (葵 御下屋敷) in Higashi-ku, Nagoya. It was a type of oniwa-yaki (御庭焼 literally "garden ware"). The opening of the kiln is thought to have been around 1843, the year of Naritaka's long stay in Nagoya. It is said that Katō Tosaburō (加藤唐三郎), an Akazu ware potter, was involved in the construction of the kiln, but there are very few artefacts that have been handed down to the present, and many things remain unknown.

== See also ==
- Ofukei ware, a type of oniwa-yaki (御庭焼 literally "garden ware")
- Hagiyama ware
