= Ōzone Oshitayashiki =

Coordinates: 35°11′03.78″N 136°55′56.17″E

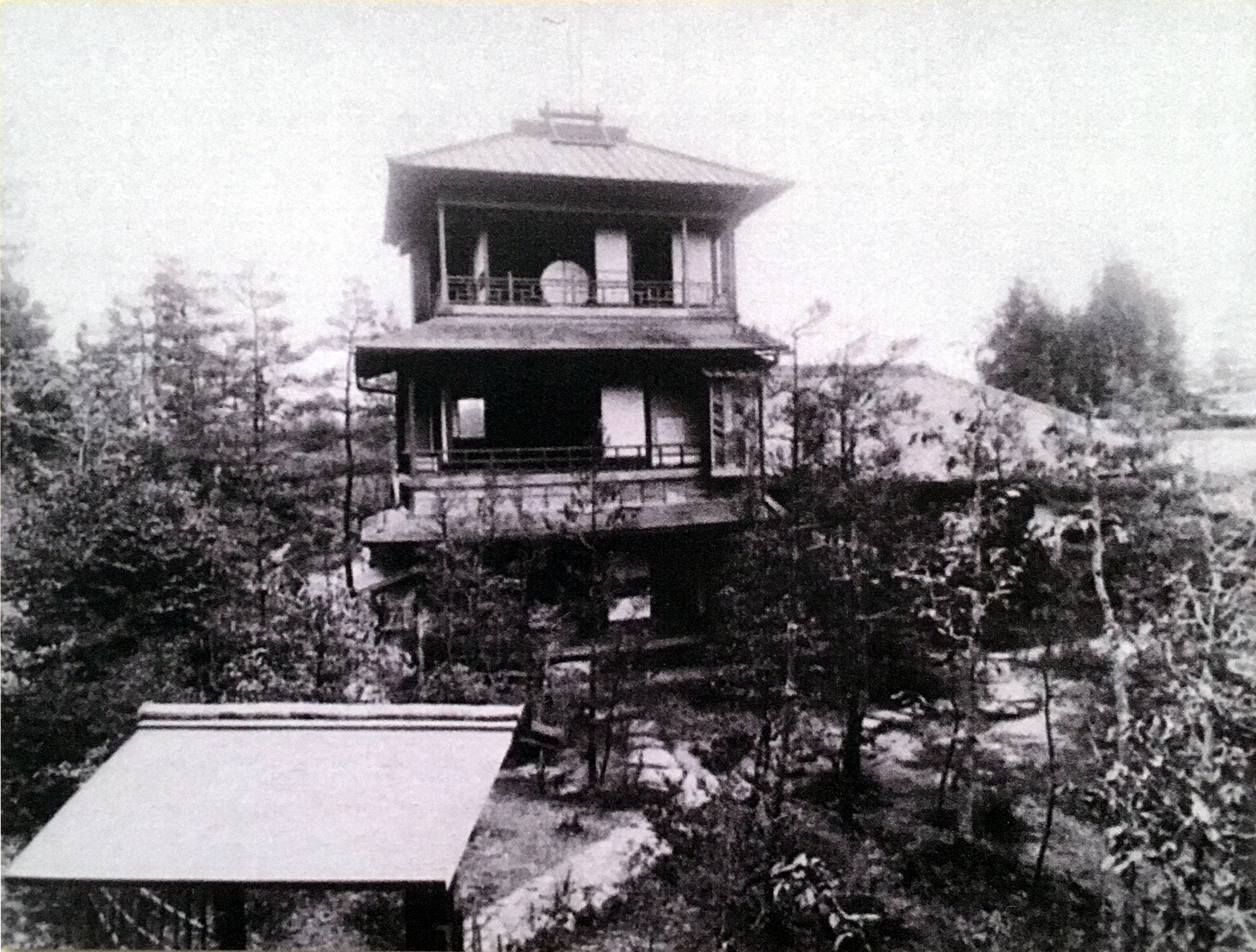
Building of the Ōzone Oshitayashiki

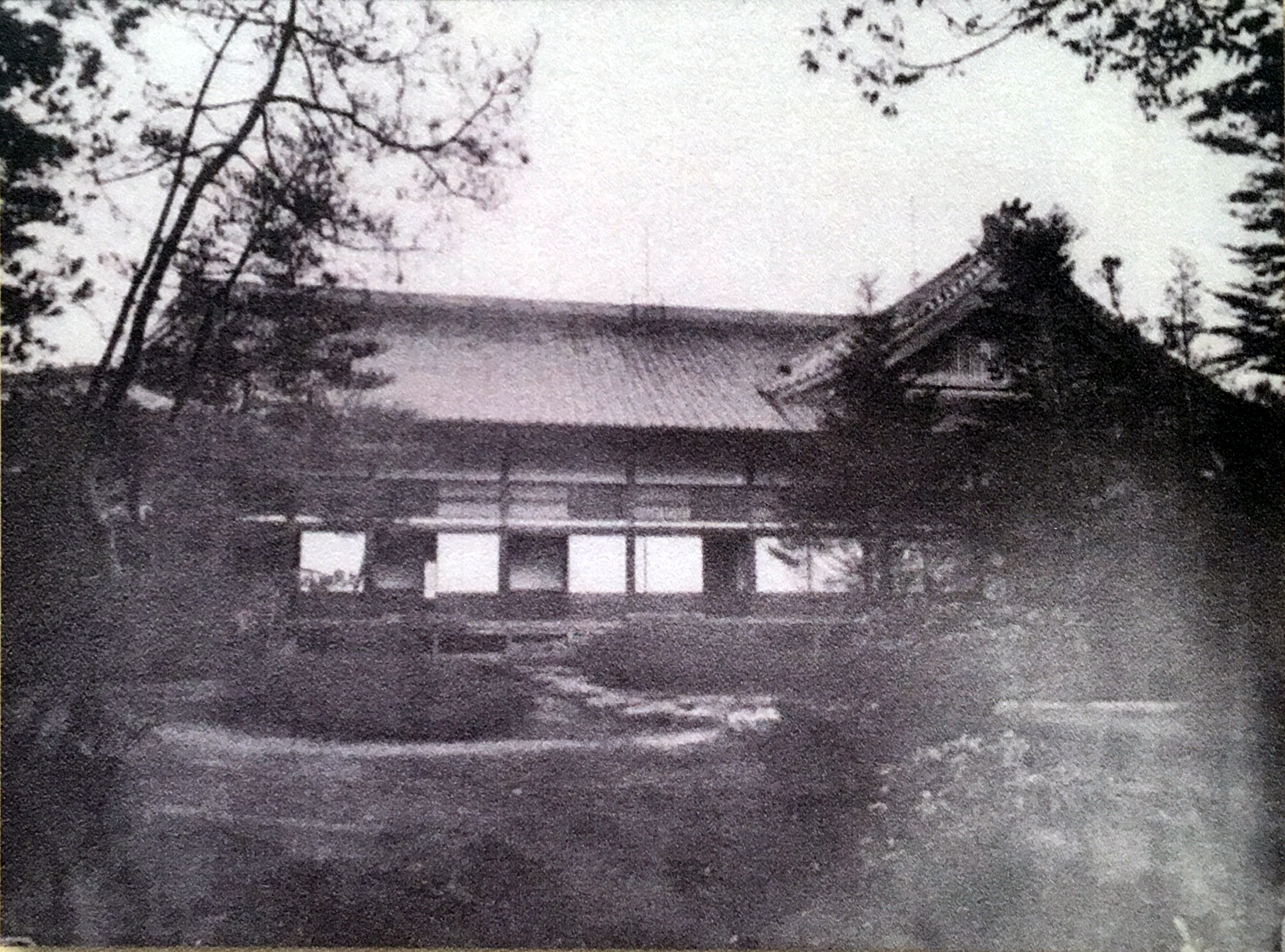
Building of the Ōzone Oshitayashiki

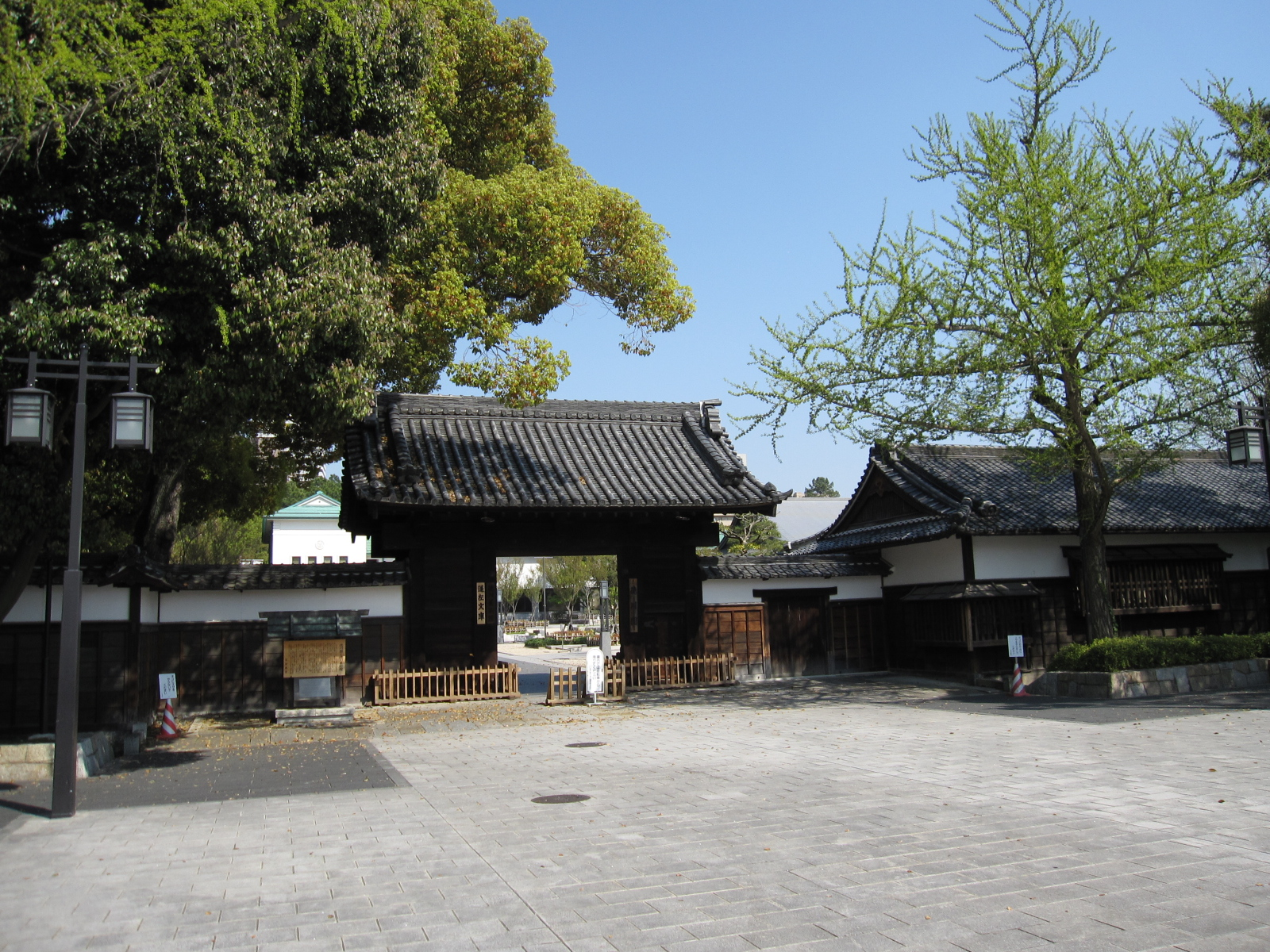
The main Black Gate (Kuro-mon) of the Ōzone Oshitayashiki

The Ōzone Oshitayashiki (大曽根 御下屋敷), sometimes also read as Shimoyashiki (下屋敷), is a former residence of the Owari branch of the Tokugawa clan, located in Ōzone in Higashi ward in Nagoya, central Japan.

== History ==
In the early Edo period (1603-1867), Tokugawa Mitsutomo (1625-1700), head of the Owari Tokugawa clan and lord of the Owari Domain, established a vast residence in the Ōzone neighbourhood as a retreat from the main residence at Nagoya Castle. During the Edo period, a Shimoyashiki (下屋敷) was a smaller residence or retreat of a lord, as opposed to his "upper" or main residence, called Kamiyashiki (上屋敷). The size of the original residence was about 130,000 tsubo (坪; about 429,000 square metres; 4,620,000 sq ft). After Lord Mitsutomo died, the grounds of the residence were divided and held by three senior vassal families of the Owari Tokugawa: the Naruse, the Ishiko, and the Watanabe families. After the Meiji Restoration in 1869, the Owari Tokugawa reacquired the estate, and rebuilt the family's residence in 1900, to be suitable for their newly elevated Marquess (侯爵, kōshaku) rank.

The role of the residence became less relevant during and after the Taishō era (1911-1925). In 1931, Tokugawa Yoshichika (1886-1976), the 19th head of the Tokugawa family, decided that the time had come to present the property to the community, and donated the 23,000 m^{2} (250,000 sq ft) of land and buildings to the City of Nagoya. The city maintained the estate and buildings, and opened the Tokugawa-en Garden to the public the next year.

Marquess Yoshichika established the Owari Tokugawa Reimeikai Foundation in 1931 to protect the treasures of the Owari Tokugawa family from being broken up. Today the Owari Tokugawa Reimeikai Foundation is named the Tokugawa Reimeikai Foundation. He opened the Tokugawa Art Museum in 1935 and donated the treasures to the foundation. Although the residence was destroyed during the bombing of Nagoya in World War II, the main building of the museum survived. The garden was heavily damaged but later restored in 2004, and the main Black Gate (Kuro-mon) remained intact.

Today, the complex houses the Tokugawa Art Museum, the Hōsa Library and the Tokugawa Garden. Together, they are a showcase of the might and culture of the Owari Tokugawa. It can be accessed by public transport via Morishita Station on the Seto line or Ōzone Station by the Meijo line.

== Images ==
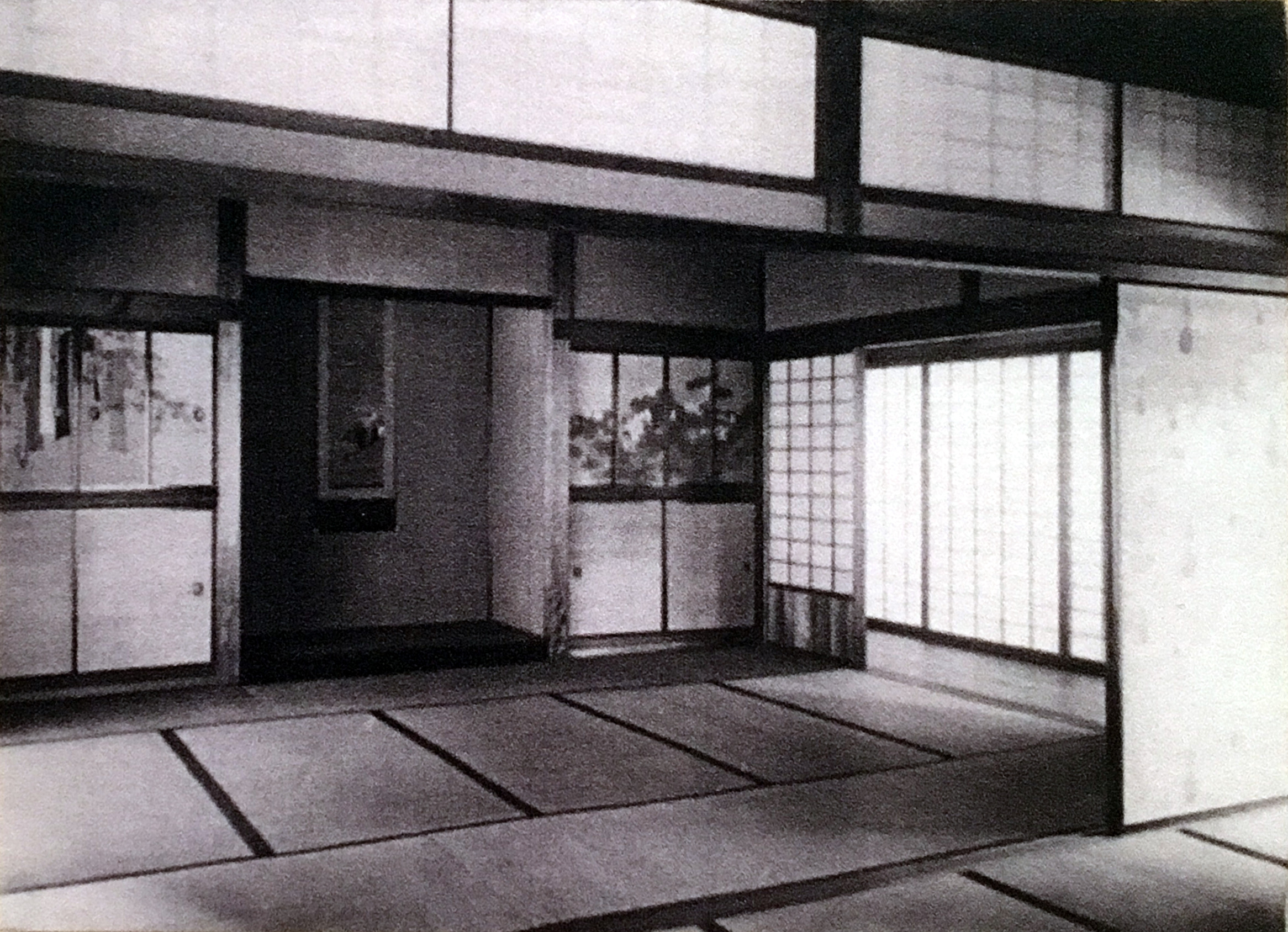
Interior view

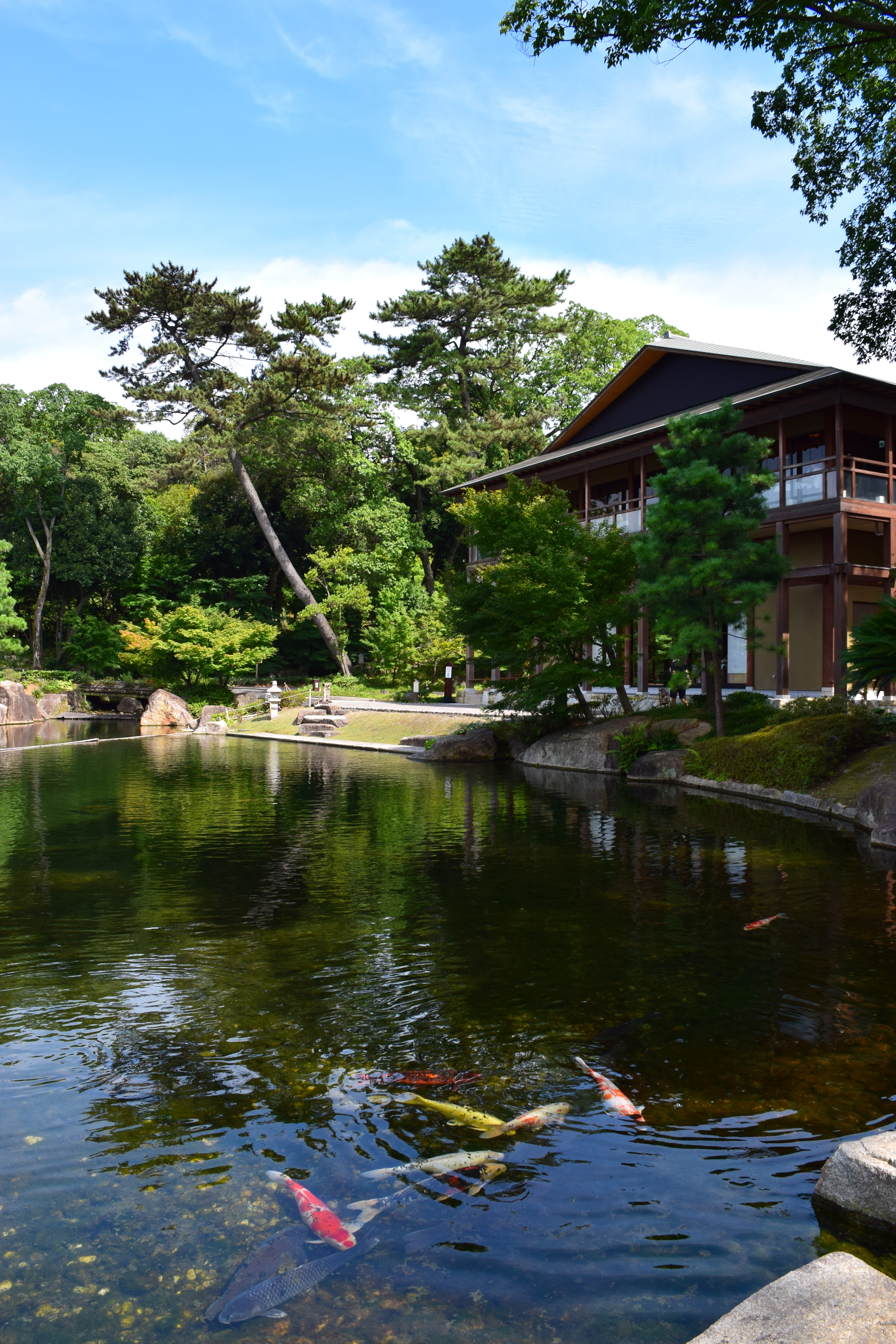
Garden with pond of the Ōzone Oshitayashiki

== See also ==
- List of Owari Tokugawa residences
- Aoi Oshitayashiki
- Sankei-en and Rinshunkaku in Yokohama
