= Hōraku ware =

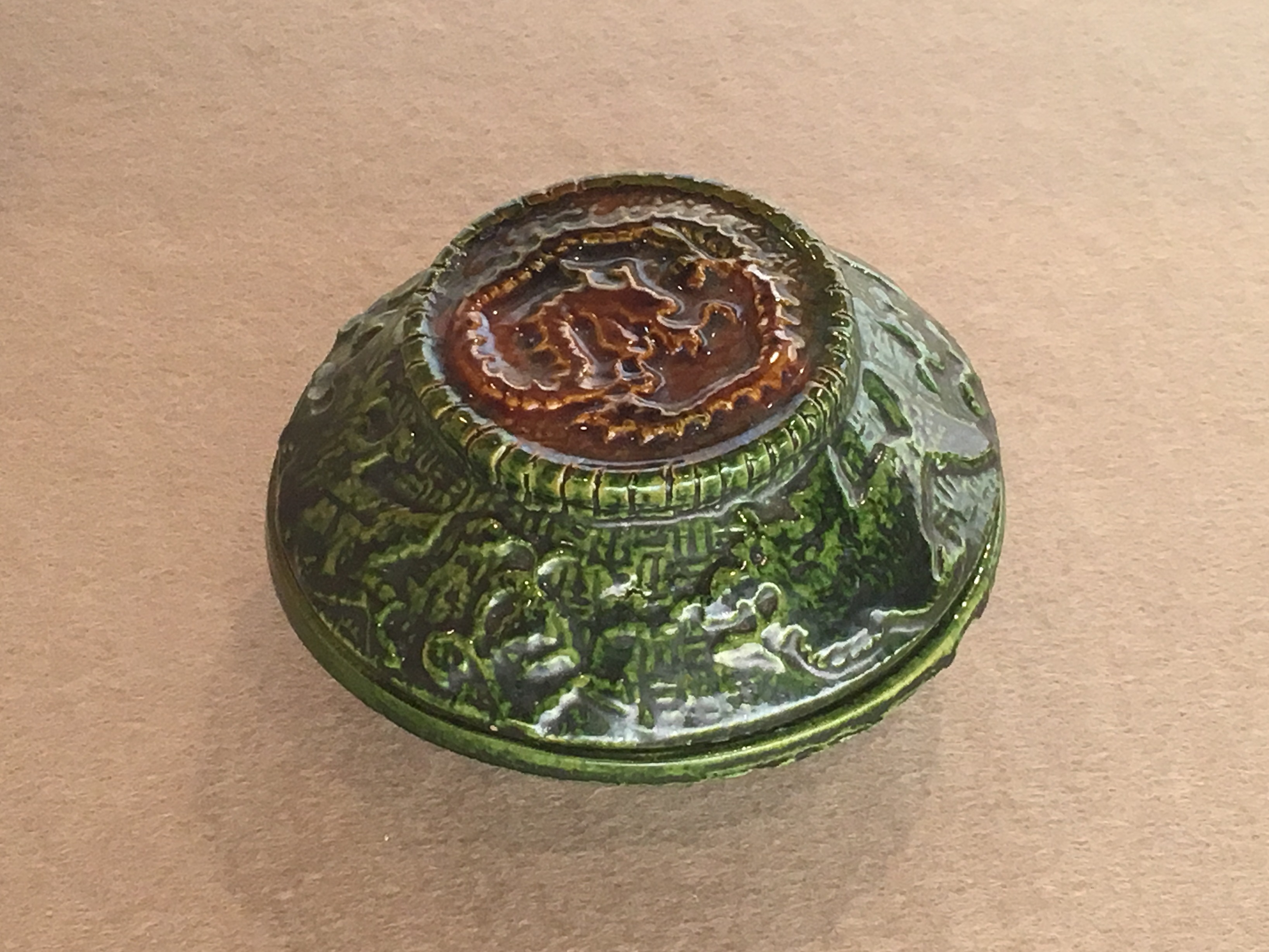
Kōgō incense box, Kōchi style, dragons design, green glaze, by Rikei. Edo period, 18th century

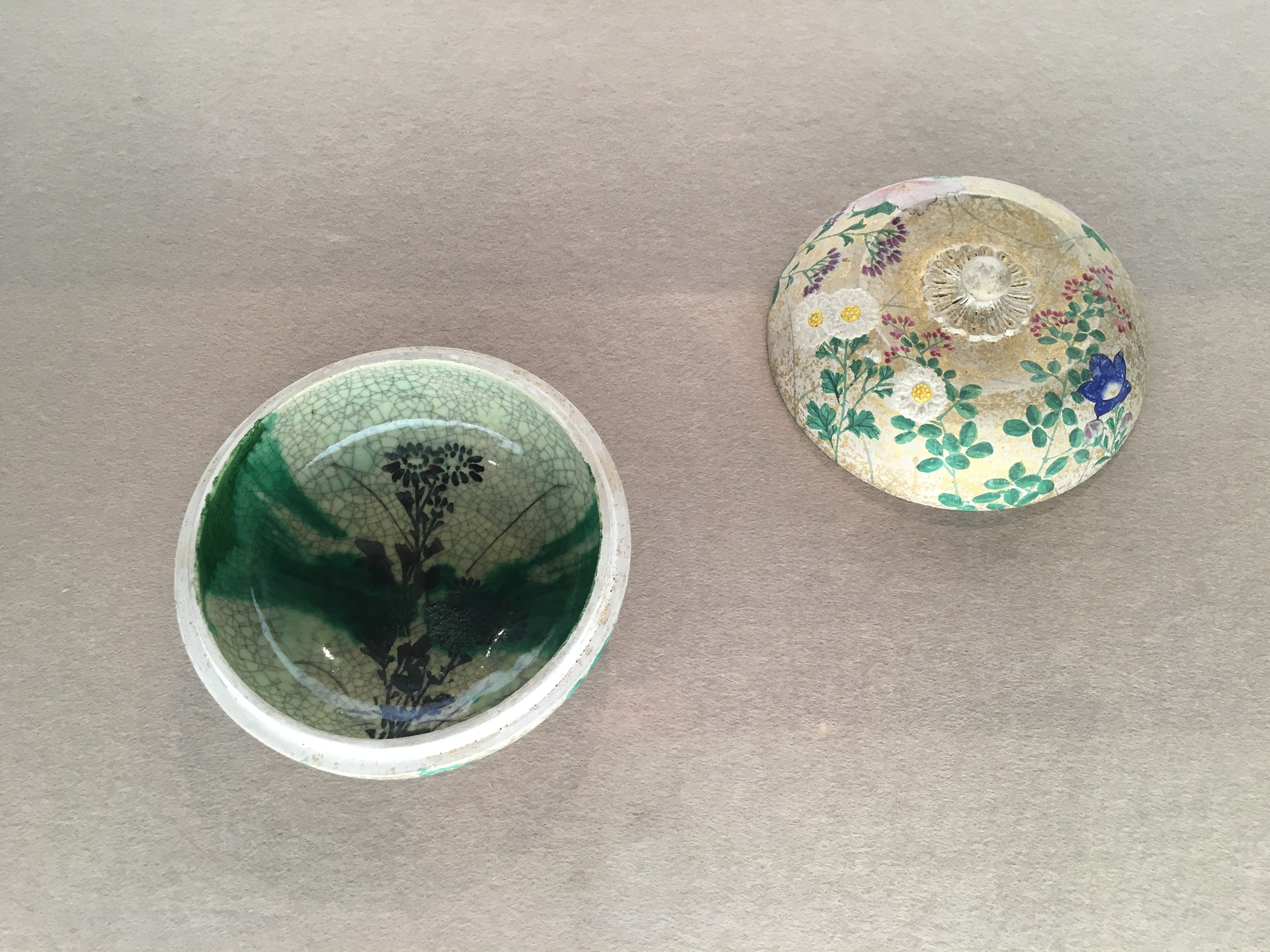
Covered bowl, flower and glass design, by Toyosuke III. Edo period, 18th-19th century

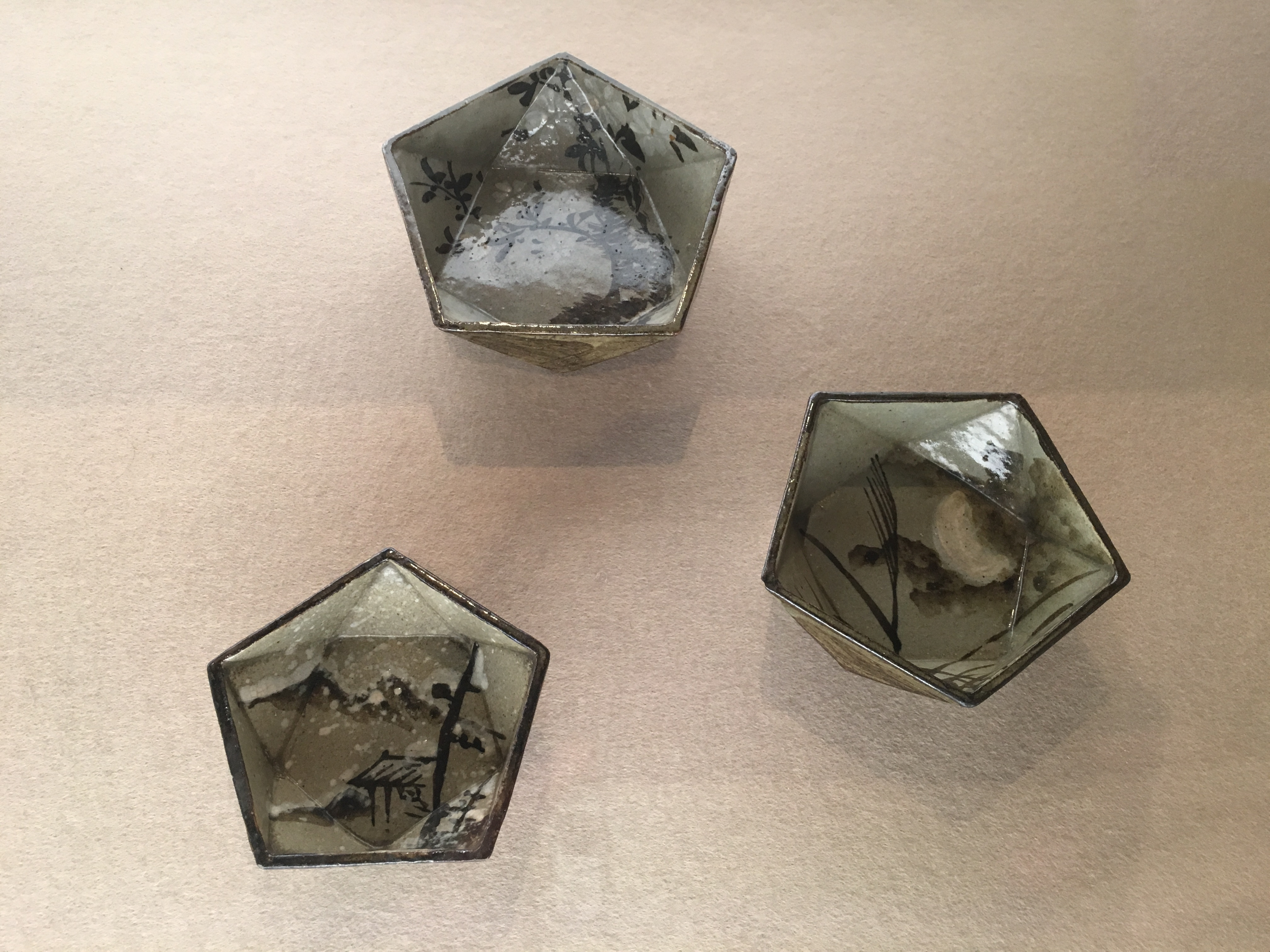
Pentagonal bowls, snow, moon and floral design, by Toyosuke IV. Edo period, 19th century

Hōraku ware (豊楽焼) is a type of Japanese pottery historically from Nagoya, Owari Province, central Japan. The first kanji character 豊, which means "abundant", can be compounded and pronounced as "Hō" or "Toyo", therefore it is also known as Toyoraku ware. Use of that kanji is common in the region, where cities such as Toyohashi, Toyokawa, Toyota, and Toyoake can be found.

== History ==
Production started in the later Edo period when it was founded by Rikei Katō (1708–1796), a ceramist who lived in the Owari domain. His successor, Toyohachi (?–1801), continued the style under that name. Some source state he worked in the central Ōsu area of Nagoya, south of the temple Banshō-ji. However, that conflicts with the family memoir, which states that he lived in Fujimigahara, and that the third generation moved in 1753 from Fujimigahara to central Nagoya, which is also confirmed by a reference in the sen-cha text called "Sencha Soshinan", published in 1779.

Toyoraku's third generation, Daiki Toyosuke (大喜豊助 1779–1864), took up the family name Daiki, which was to continue. He served as a master of his craft in the Owari domain. In addition to Unge ware, Oribe, aka-e, shimitsu and fukai, etc., he also used natural mottling on earthenware to produce a marbleized effect. The tea handbook Sencha haya-shinan of 1801 mentions Toyosuke as an expert of teaware, with the following words of praise: "Except for kibisho (kyūsu) teapots, it is unnecessary to go seek for masters in the capital." The seals were "Toyaka" (豊禾) and "Toyosuke" (豊助).

The fourth generation, Toyosuke IV (四代豊助 1813–1858), moved back to Nagoya and worked in Kami-maezu (上前津) in today's Naka-ku. He also produced ceramic ware in Owari domain. He specialised in making elaborate ceramic pieces by applying maki-e, to make them resemble lacquerware or wood. Some of his works were done in the Raku ware style, from which it received its name.

The fifth generation, Toyosuke V, died in 1885.

The sixth generation, Toyosuke VI, lived from 1848 to 1917. He apparently made tea wares and sculptural pieces to the order of Emperor Meiji in 1876, and also exhibited domestically and abroad, winning a prize at the Exposition Universelle (1878) in Paris. From 1896 he began actively exporting wares to the United States. In his late years, he turned his attention to the workshop specialty of Raku-type ware.

His son became the seventh head of the workshop, but died prematurely from illness. Therefore, his second son became the eighth and last generation head of the workshop in Taishō 3 (1915).

== See also ==
During the time of the production, Ofukei ware, Hagiyama ware and Sasashima ware were also made, mostly for tea utensils.

Other pottery from Nagoya and the wider Owari region:

- Kawana ware
- Tokoname ware
- Inuyama ware
