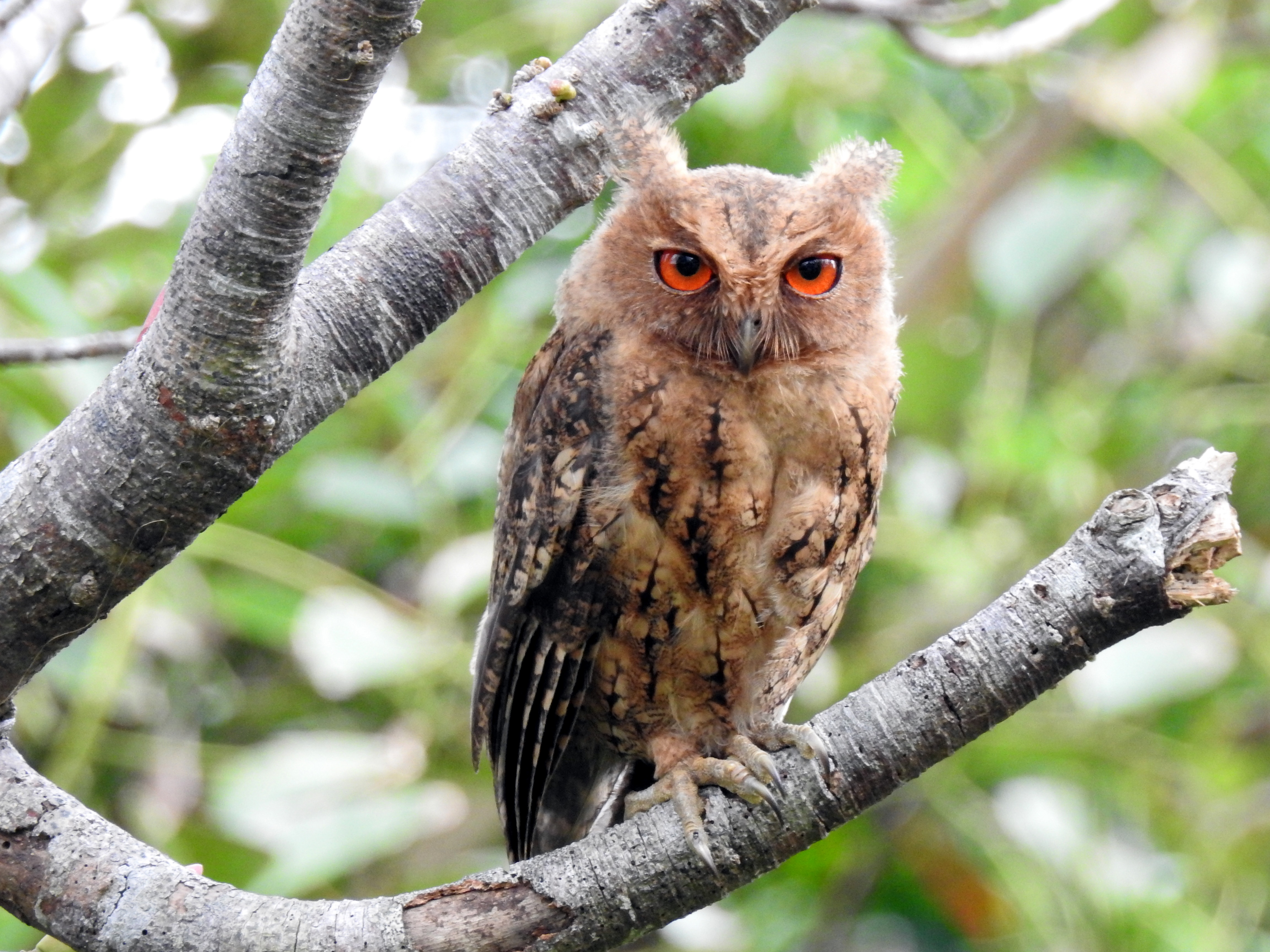
- Otus semitorques pryeri on Okinawa

Conservation status
- Least Concern (IUCN 3.1)
- CITES Appendix II

Scientific classification
- Kingdom: Animalia
- Phylum: Chordata
- Class: Aves
- Order: Strigiformes
- Family: Strigidae
- Genus: Otus
- Species: O. semitorques

Binomial name
- Otus semitorques Temminck & Schlegel, 1845

= Japanese scops owl =

Species of bird

The Japanese scops-owl (Otus semitorques) is a small owl species in the family Strigidae, or true owl family. It is a member of the genus Otus, the scops owl genus. It is resident to Japan, China, Korea, and Russia.

Japanese scops-owls have a grey-brown plumage, red eyes, and prominent ear tufts. They resides in forests, woodlands, and mountains. They are carnivorous, mainly feeding on invertebrates and small rodents. They nest in tree hollows and raise a small brood. Males use their vocalizations to attract mates or deter predators.

== Taxonomy ==
The Japanese scops-owl was first classified by Temminck and Schlegel in 1845. It is part of the family Strigidae, the true owl family, which contains 90% of all owl species. The other 10% of owls are part of the family Tytonidae, the barn owl family. The Japanese scops-owl is part of the genus Otus which is the largest genus of owls. This genus includes 59 species of scops-owls found throughout Afro-Eurasia. The genus Otus was first introduced by Thomas Pennant in 1769 with the discovery of the Indian scops-owl. The Japanese scops-owl is closely related to the Indian scops-owl (O. bakkamoena) and was once thought to be the same species. It is also related to the collared scops-owl (O. lettia) and the Sunda scops-owl (O. lempiji). These four species are sometimes considered conspecific and can be combined into a species known as the collared scops-owl (O. bakkamoena). The genus name Otus, derived from Latin, means small-eared owl.

Three subspecies are recognised:

- O. s. ussuriensis (Buturlin, 1910) – northeast China, southeast Siberia and Korea Peninsula
- O. s. semitorques Temminck & Schlegel, 1845 – Kuril Islands and Hokkaido south to Yakushima (Ōsumi Islands, south Japan)
- O. s. pryeri (Gurney, JH Sr, 1889) – Okinawa to Iriomote (central, south Ryukyu Islands, south Japan)

== Description ==
Japanese scops-owls are 16.5–30 cm (6.5–11.8 in) tall, and their wingspan is 60–66 cm (23.5–26 in). They weigh 130–200 g (4.6–7.1 oz). Their plumage is gray and brown, resembling the bark of a tree which helps them camouflage in their environment. Their wings are long, around 153–196 mm (6.0–7.7 in), and pointed. Furthermore, like most scops-owls, they have prominent ear tufts. This species has a pale grey-brown facial disc, intense red eyes, green feet, with feathered toes, and a green bill. It is often confused with the collared scops-owl which is smaller and whiter than the Japanese scops-owl. It is also confused with the northern white-faced owl which is also whiter than the Japanese scops-owl but relatively the same size. This species can reach flight speeds of 80 kph (50 mph).

== Habitat and distribution ==
Japanese scops-owls live in forested habitats such as lowland forests, wooded plain and forested hillsides, as well as woodlands and mountains. They can be found in habitats at elevations between sea-level and 900 meters. They can also be found in the parks and gardens of villages. This species is resident, but it can do small-scale migrations. Japanese scops-owls can move locally depending on the seasons, coming at lower elevations in winter. Japanese scops-owls are found in Japan, Korea, China, and Russia. O. s. ussriensis is found in Sakhalin, Primorsky Krai and Northeastern China. O. s. semitorques is resident to the Korean Peninsula, Jeju Island, Kuril Islands, Sado Island, Tsushima Island, Goto Islands, Hokkaido and Yakushima. O. s. pryeri inhabits Izu Islands and Ryukyu Islands.

== Behavior and ecology ==
=== Hunting and feeding ===
Japanese scops-owls feed primarily on invertebrates (insects, millipedes, centipedes, crustaceans) then followed by small rodents (voles and mice). They can also feed on small birds, frogs, lizards, snakes and fish. They are active predators meaning they mostly search for prey while flying. Still, they sometimes perch to hunt. When consuming rodents, they most often go for juveniles as it is easier to find sedentary prey such as juveniles in a nest. They hunt in open areas and rely on auditory cues to detect prey and prey nests. Their eyes are adapted to nocturnal living which explains why they hunt at night.

=== Breeding ===
Japanese scops-owls are solitary until breeding season. They are a monogamous species, and they form pairs which they keep through the breeding season. Males lure females with their vocalization to a nest they have prepared. The males often will reuse the old nests of other birds. The females choose their partner based on their nest building skills and how much food is in the nest. Japanese scops-owl nest from March to July. They nest mostly in tree cavities or nest boxes. They lay their eggs in March. The female incubates the eggs for 3 to 4 weeks during which the male will bring her food. Fledgling occurs in May and June. The owlets are born naked with a few down feathers, and they can fly at 4 to 6 weeks. Females lay one clutch of 2 to 5 eggs per season except if the eggs are destroyed. On average, 1 to 3 eggs will hatch. The main predators of this species are snakes and they attack their eggs. Japanese scops-owls compete with Ryukyu scops-owls (O. elegans) for nests since nests that are higher in elevation receive less snake predation. Japanese scops-owls have a lifespan of 12 years.

=== Vocalization ===
Japanese scops-owls have varied vocalizations including screeches, meows, hoots and chatters. They screech mostly to deter predators. Males usually give repeated deep "whook" at different intervals. Some of their other calls are described as "kwe" or "koo" notes. They also repeat "kwee-kwee" and "pew-u, pew-u" sounds.

== Conservation status ==
Japanese scops-owls are considered of Least Concern by the IUCN Red List. They are found throughout a large range and their population trend is stable. They are common and live in close proximity to humans. Still, especially in Korea, Japanese scops-owls are prone to anthropogenic impacts. Traffic accidents, habitat destruction, hunting and poisoning pose serious threats to this species and could negatively affect its population size in the long run.

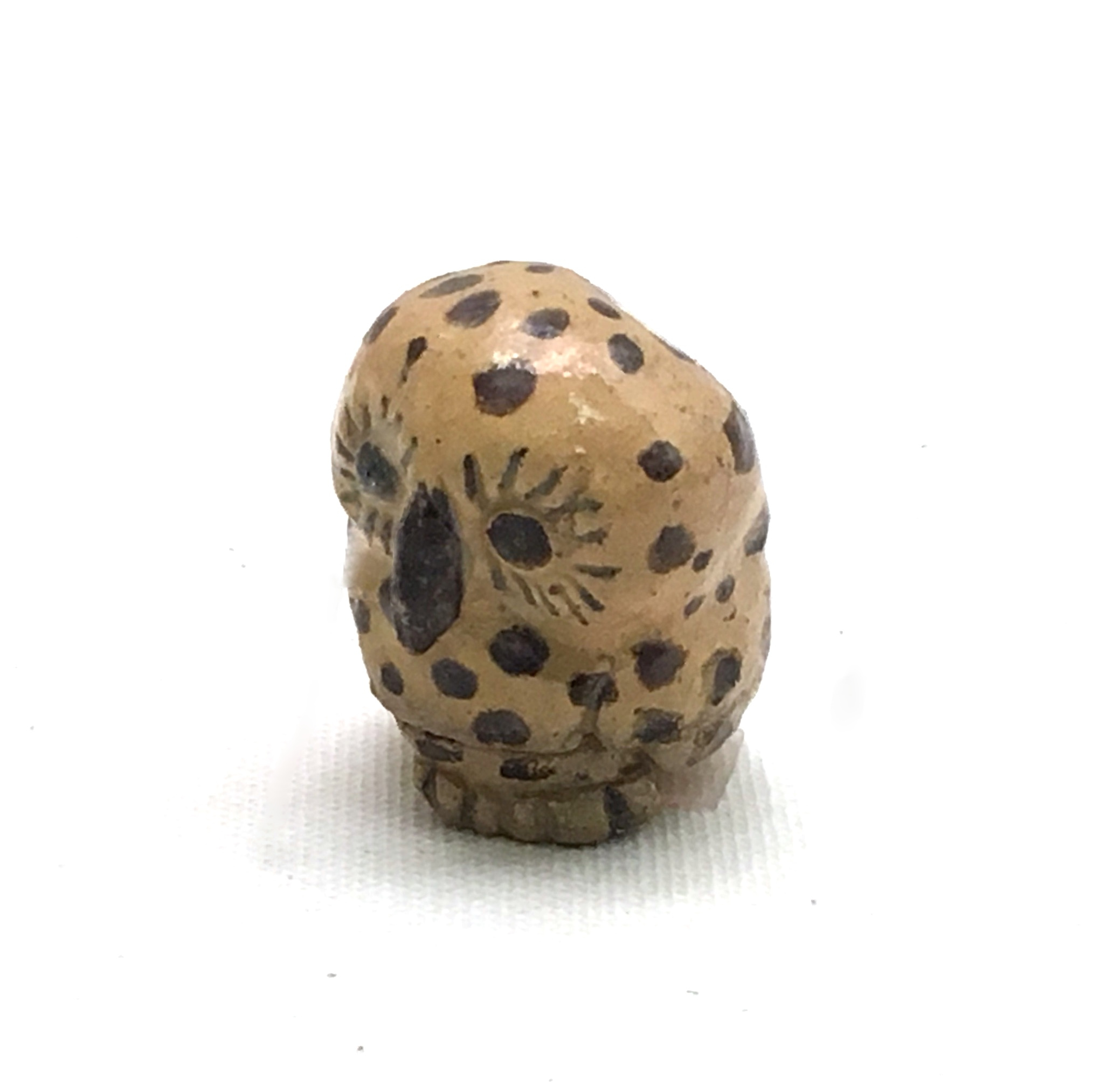
Hagiyama ware incense container in the shape of an owl, late Edo Period

== Cultural significance ==
In Japanese culture, owls symbolize good luck, wisdom and protection against misfortune. Scops-owls can be found represented in Japanese art such as pottery and paintings. They are also often depicted in literature and films due to their unique and mysterious appearance.
