= Gifu Goten =

Former Owari Domain palace and magistrate's office in Gifu, Japan

Coordinates: 35.429434°N 136.767105°E

- 岐阜御殿 (Japanese)
- Gifu Town Magistrate's Office
- Type: Goten (Domain Palace), later Jinya and magistrate's office
- Associated with: Owari Tokugawa family, Gifu magistrates
- Location: Shinsakuramachi, Gifu, Mino Province (present Gifu Prefecture), Japan

History
- Built: Genna 5 (1619)
- Demolished: Meiji era
- Abandoned: Meiji 4 (1871)

Site notes
- Condition: Destroyed; archaeological remains and historical marker
- Owner: Owari Domain

Gifu Goten (岐阜御殿) was an official residence and administrative complex of the Owari Domain located in the town of Gifu in Mino Province during the Edo period. Established after the incorporation of Gifu into Owari Domain in 1619, the compound served as a domain residence and regional administrative center for the Owari Tokugawa family. In 1695 the site became the seat of the town magistrate's office (岐阜町奉行所, Gifu Machi Bugyōsho), which governed Owari Domain's territories in the Gifu region.

The complex was among the most important Owari Domain facilities outside Nagoya Castle and functioned as the centre of taxation, policing, judicial administration, and local government in the area until the abolition of the han system in the early Meiji era.

== History ==
Following the Battle of Sekigahara in 1600 and the subsequent decline of Gifu Castle as a political centre, administrative authority in the region shifted to new institutions established under Tokugawa rule. The castle town remained an important commercial and transportation hub due to its location along the Nagara River and regional highway networks.

According to local historical traditions, a government residence was established in the area during the early Tokugawa period. After Gifu was transferred to Owari Domain in Genna 5 (1619), Owari officials stationed domain representatives in the town and developed the site into an official residence and administrative compound. The location was behind Utsuboya-chō (靱屋町) and adjacent to the urban districts at the western foot of Mount Kinka, near present-day Shin-sakuramachi, in central Gifu.

During the seventeenth century the complex functioned as an official domain residence known as Gifu Goten. The compound served as a base for Owari officials overseeing the domain's detached holdings in Mino Province and as accommodation for visiting domain authorities.

Historical descriptions indicate that the site consisted of two principal residential compounds:

- Kita-yashiki (北屋敷, North Residence)
- Minami-yashiki (南屋敷, South Residence)

These precincts later formed the nucleus of the larger administrative center that developed on the site. The Gifu establishment served as the primary center of Owari Domain administration within its Mino territories. During the Edo period the domain relied on a hierarchy of magistrates, district officials, and appointed daikan to govern territories outside the immediate vicinity of Nagoya.

In Genroku 8 (1695), Owari Domain established the office of Gifu Bugyō (岐阜奉行) and reorganized the site as the permanent administrative headquarters for the region.

From this point onward the complex became known primarily as the town magistrate's office (bugyōsho). The magistrate administered taxation, policing, judicial matters, public works, trade regulation, and communication between local communities and the authorities in Nagoya.

Administrative reforms undertaken during the eighteenth century expanded the system of local officials and strengthened direct oversight of rural communities. The Gifu magistrate's office played a central role in implementing these policies and coordinating local governance on behalf of the domain government. The magistrate's office remained in operation throughout the remainder of the Edo period and continued to function until the abolition of domain government following the Meiji Restoration.

Following the abolition of the han system in 1871, the buildings of the magistrate's compound were dismantled and the land was incorporated into the expanding urban area of modern Gifu.

Part of the former magistrate's compound was excavated in 1997. Archaeologists uncovered stone alignments interpreted as structural remains of the bugyōsho complex together with numerous ceramic and porcelain fragments dating from the Edo period.

Additional artifacts relating to later occupation of the site were discovered, including educational materials associated with schools that occupied portions of the former compound in the Meiji era.

Today no standing structures survive. A historical marker (岐阜町奉行所跡) commemorates the location, and the site is included in local historical walking routes maintained by Gifu city.

== Architecture and layout ==
The palace occupied a large enclosed compound situated at the western foot of Mount Kinka in the center of Gifu town. Historical records describe a site measuring approximately sixty ken (about 108 metres) east to west and more than one hundred twenty ken (about 216 metres) north to south.

The complex was surrounded by moats and defensive earthworks. The former north and south residences were incorporated into a unified administrative enclosure containing both residential and governmental functions.

The principal buildings included:

- The bugyōsho (magistrate's office).
- Administrative offices and hearing rooms.
- Residences for domain officials and clerical personnel (tedai yashiki).
- Residences for lower-ranking officers and guards (dōshin yashiki).
- A martial arts training hall (dōjō).
- Service buildings, warehouses, and support facilities associated with domain administration.

The arrangement followed the standard pattern of major Edo-period domain outposts, combining government offices, official residences, security facilities, and administrative infrastructure within a single fortified compound.

== See also ==
- List of Owari Tokugawa residences
- Honjin
- Kanō Castle
- Jinya
