= List of Owari Tokugawa residences =

The Tokugawa lords of Owari Domain had the largest number of mansions and residences, and owned the largest number of acres across Japan as the senior branch of the Tokugawa clan during the feudal Edo period. Their main residence was the Ninomaru Palace (Ninomaru Goten) at Nagoya Castle, while the Honmaru Palace (Honmaru Goten) was reserved for official guests.

The complex of Nagoya Castle included the Sannomaru Oyakata to the east, and the Shin Goten (New Palace) and the tea houses and pavillons of the Shitaofuke-niwa to the north. Other significant residences were the Aoi Oshitayashiki and the Ōzone Oshitayashiki.

Furthermore throughout the domain and outside such as in Edo the Tokugawa Owari branch kept a number of large palaces and mansions. These were called Owari Han-tei (尾張藩邸), literally "residences of the Owari Domain".

While many structures were large palaces or mansions with big land tracts around them, other residences were smaller for a reduced retinue.

== List of residences and mansions ==
=== in Nagoya ===
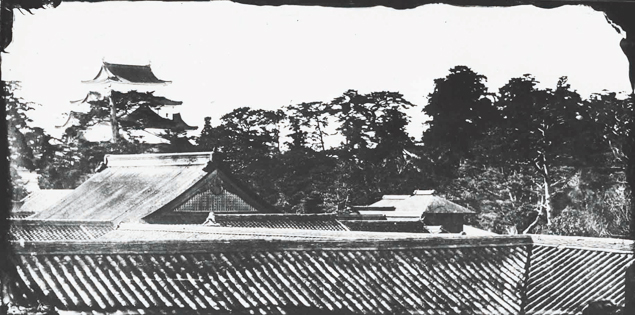
Photograph of the roofs of the Ninomaru Goten towards the main keep of Nagoya Castle

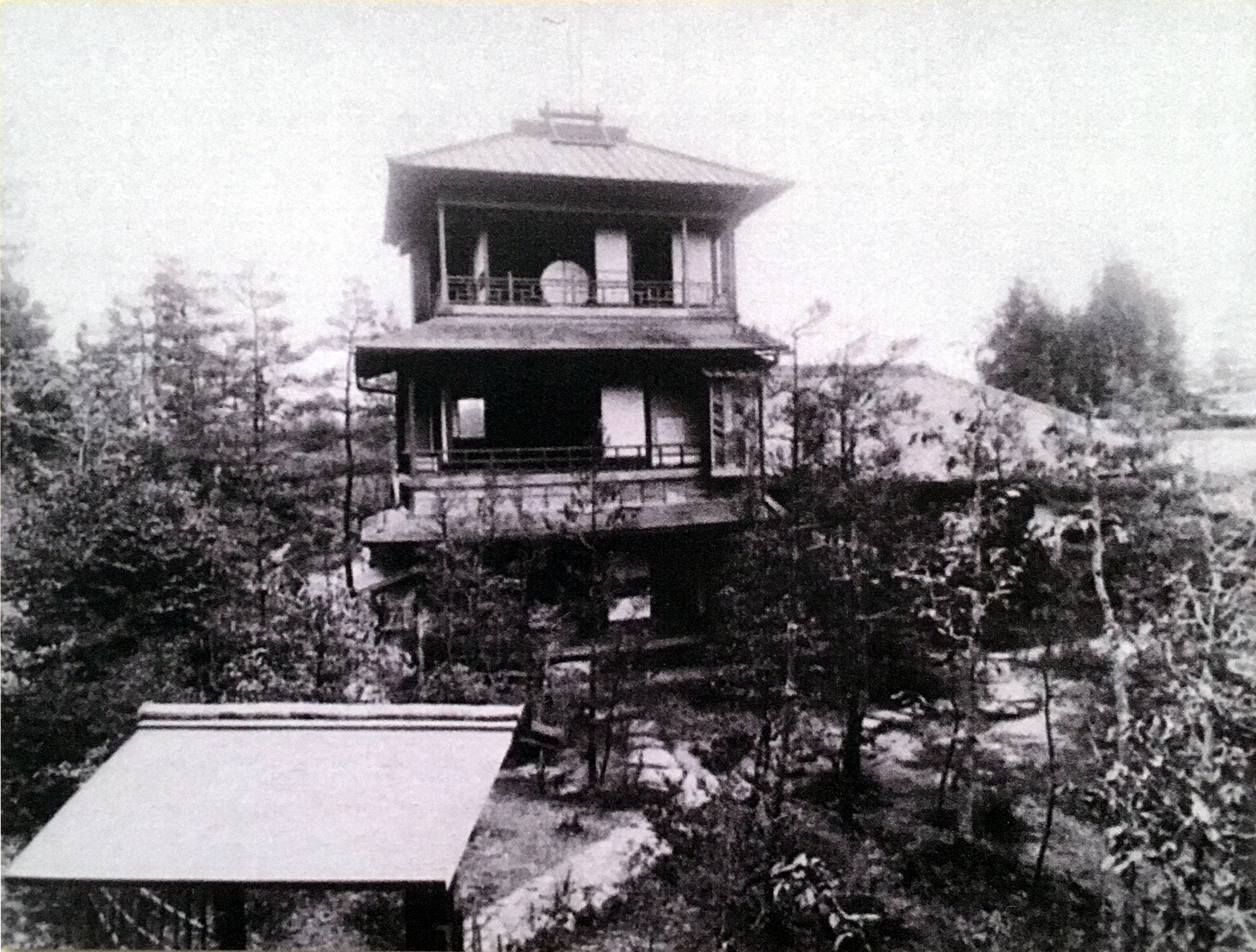
Photograph of the main building of the Ōzone Oshitayashiki

The core residences were located within Nagoya Castle, the political center of the domain:

- Ninomaru Goten (二の丸御殿), Nagoya Castle
- Sannomaru Oyakata (三の丸御屋形), Nagoya Castle
- Shin Goten (新御殿), Nagoya Castle
- Shitaofuke-niwa, Nagoya Castle

Major suburban estates (御下屋敷 / secondary residences), these served as retreat residences (下屋敷, shimoyashiki) for the lords:

- Aoi Oshitayashiki (葵 御下屋敷), Higashi Ward, Nagoya
- Ōzone Oshitayashiki (大曽根 御下屋敷), Higashi Ward, Nagoya

=== in Owari ===
Regional palaces (御殿 / goten) numerous domain residences and villas:

- Yanagihara Hioki Goten (柳原日置御殿), Nakamura Ward, Nagoya
- Higashihama Goten (東浜御殿), Atsuta Ward, Nagoya
- Nishihama Goten (西浜御殿), Atsuta Ward, Nagoya
- Yokosuka Goten (横須賀御殿), Tōkai
- Ōno Goten (大野御殿), Ōno
- Asamiya Goten (朝宮御殿), Kasugai
- Sakashita Goten (坂下御殿), Kasugai
- Mizuno Goten (水野御殿), Seto
- Arai Goten (新居御殿), Owariasahi
- Komaki Goten (小牧御殿), Komaki
- Tsushima Goten (津島御殿), Tsushima
- Saya Goten (佐屋御殿), Aisai
- Uzurayama Goten (鶉山御殿), Aisai
- Hagiwara Goten (萩原御殿), Ichinomiya
- Kariyasuga Goten (苅安賀御殿), Ichinomiya

=== in Mino ===
- Gifu Goten (岐阜御殿), Gifu

=== in Edo ===
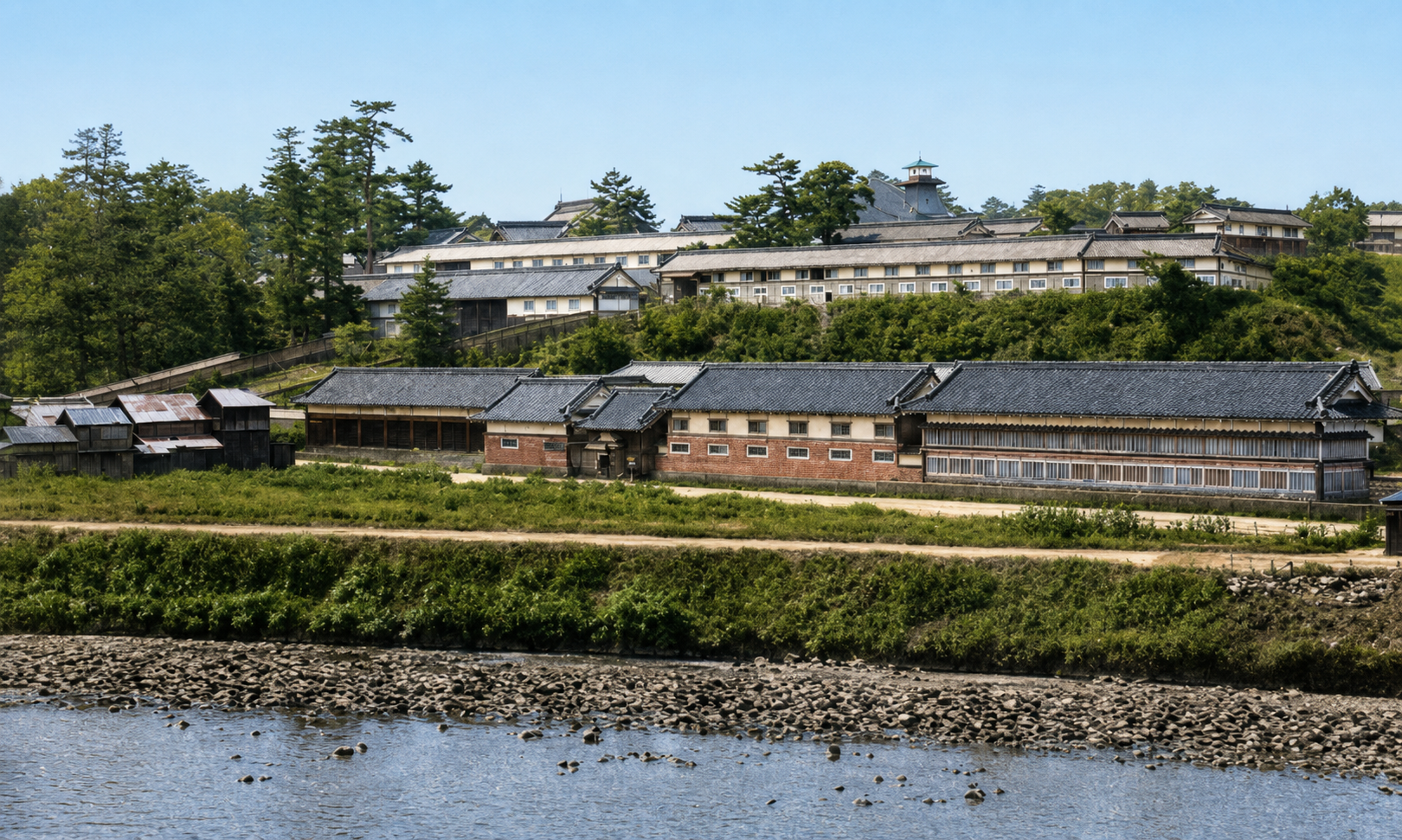
Colourised photograph of the kamiyashiki of Ichigaya in Edo

In Edo a number of various sites were kept for administrative but also prestige and status reasons.

Upper residence (上屋敷 / kamiyashiki):

- Ichigaya Kamiyashiki (市ヶ谷上屋敷)

Middle residence (中屋敷 / nakayashiki):

- Kōjimachi Nakayashiki (麹町中屋敷)

Lower residence (下屋敷 / shimoyashiki):

- Toyama Shimoyashiki (戸山下屋敷)

Other Edo residences:

- Nezumiana Yashiki (鼠穴屋敷)
- Tsukiji Kurayashiki (築地蔵屋敷)
