= Sankei-en =

Japanese garden in Yokohama, Japan

- 三溪園
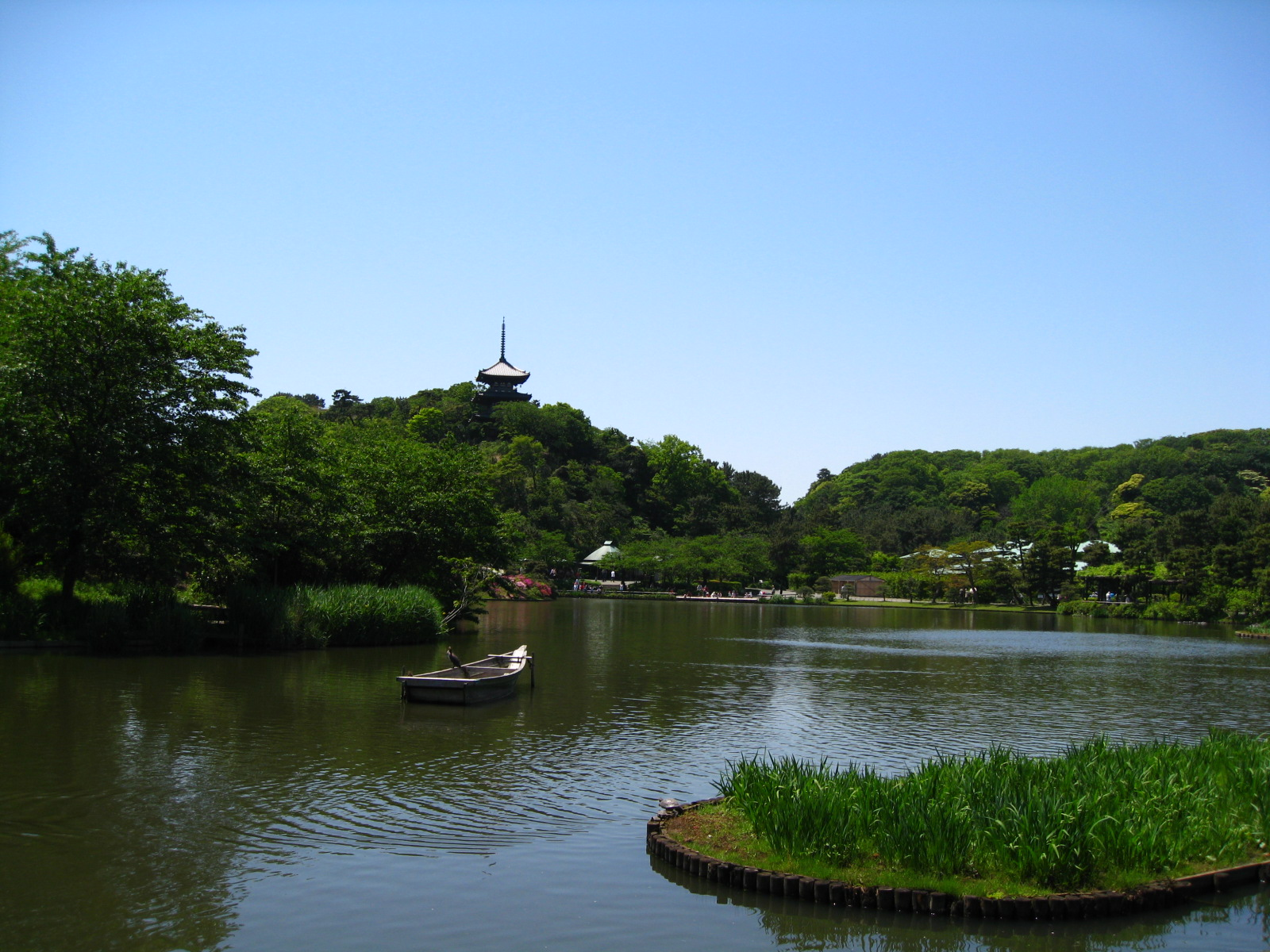
- Sankei-en's Main Pond with Tōmyō-ji's former Three-storied Pagoda in the background

- Location within Japan
- Type: Japanese garden
- Location: Yokohama, Kanagawa Prefecture, Japan
- Coordinates: 35°25′01″N 139°39′36″E
- Created: 1906

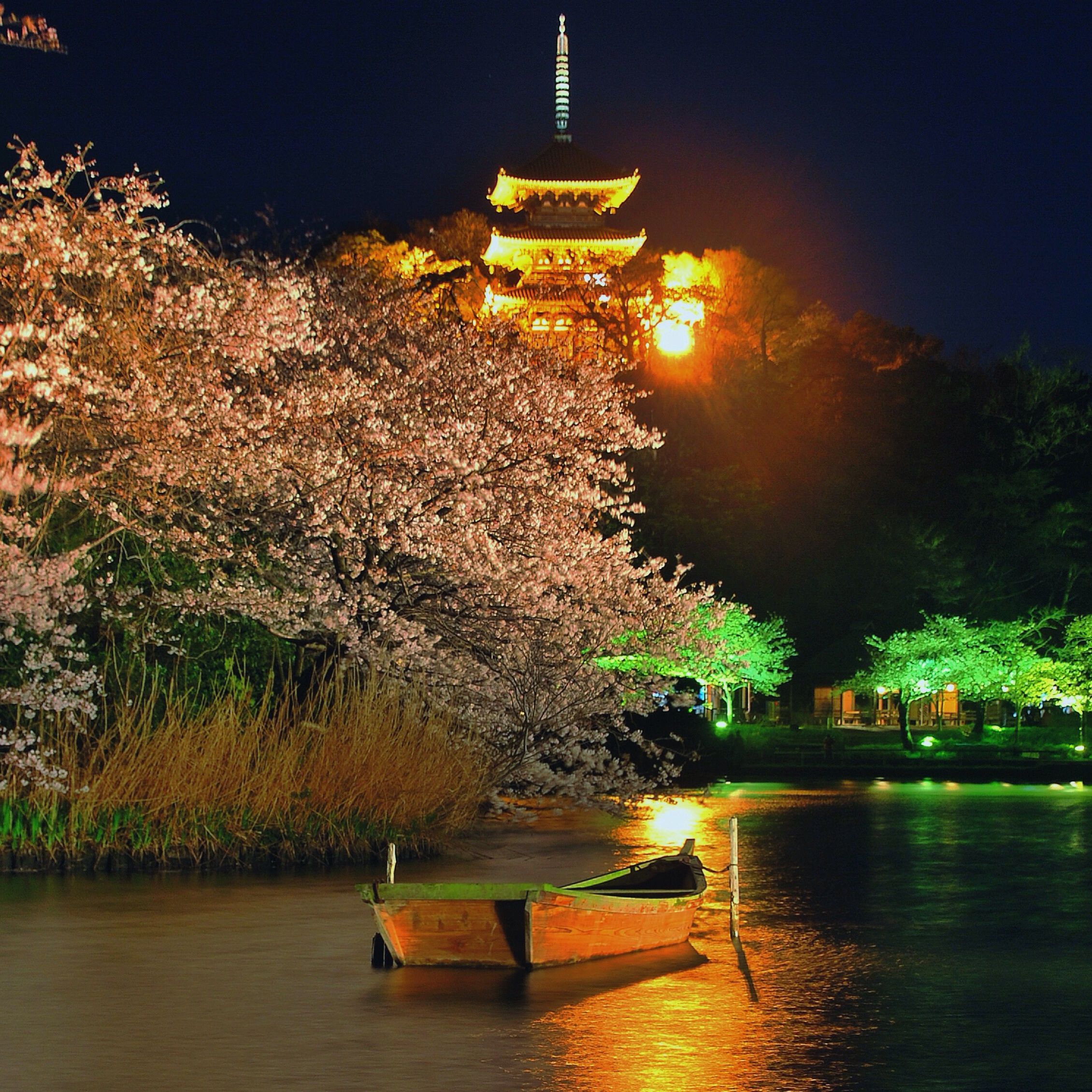

Sankei-en (三溪園, Three Creeks Garden) is a traditional Japanese-style garden in Naka Ward, Yokohama, Japan, which opened in 1906. Sankei-en was designed and built by Tomitaro Hara (原富太郎) (1868–1939), known by the pseudonym Sankei Hara, who was a silk trader. Almost all of its buildings are historically significant structures bought by Hara himself in locations all over the country, among them Tokyo, Kyoto, Kamakura, Gifu Prefecture, and Wakayama Prefecture. Ten have been declared Important Cultural Property, and three more are Tangible Cultural Properties of Japan designated by the City of Yokohama. Badly damaged during World War II, the garden was donated in 1953 to the City of Yokohama, which entrusted it to the Sankeien Hoshōkai Foundation (三溪園保勝会, Sankeien Hoshōkai). Sankei-en was then restored almost to its pre-war condition.

== Features ==
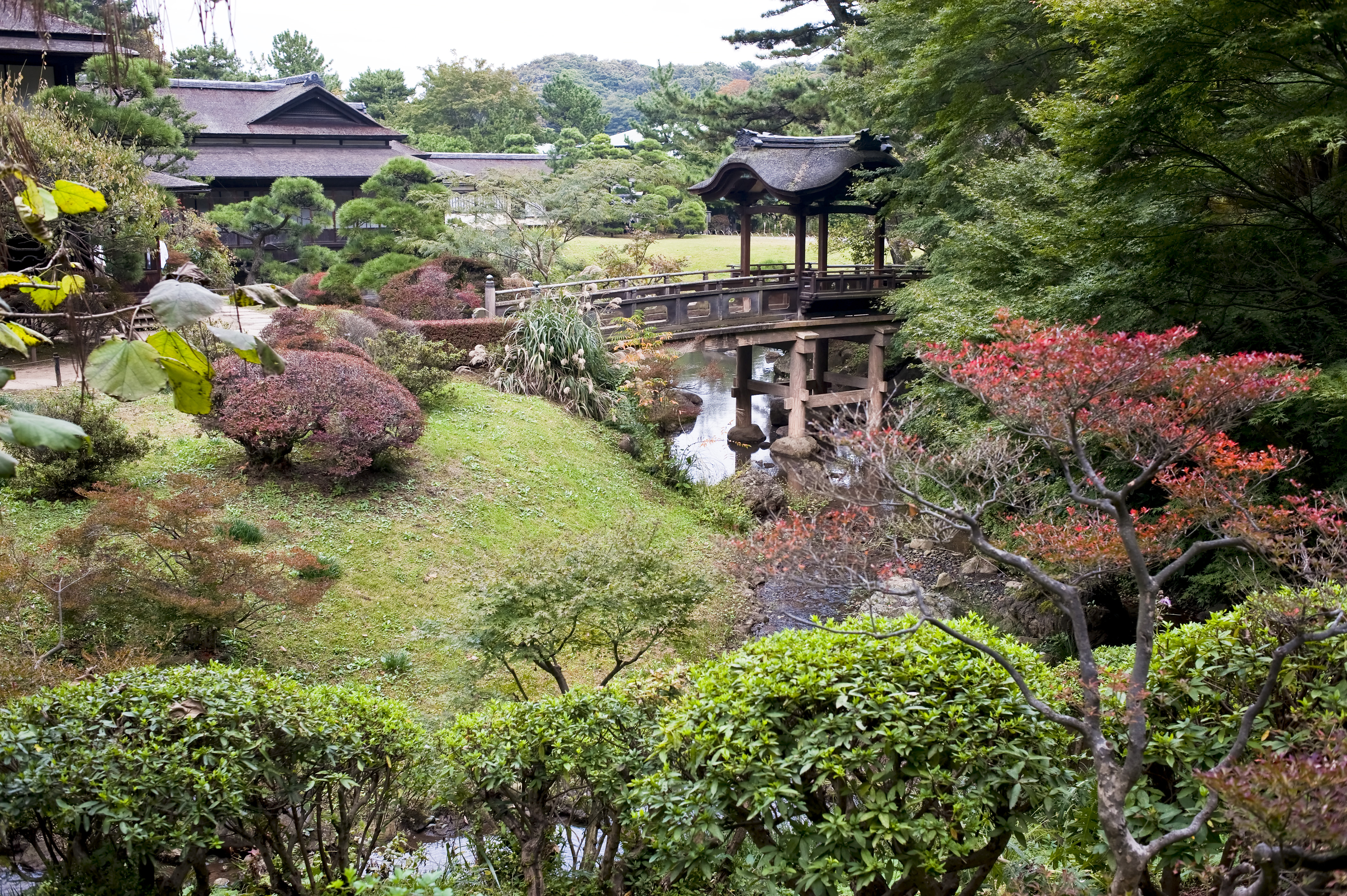
The Rinshunkaku and the Teisha Bridge

Sankei-en has a total surface of 175 thousand square meters and features ponds, streams, and undulating paths designed by Sankei Hara himself, plus many historic buildings, such as Tōmyō-ji former three-story pagoda (旧燈明寺三重塔), originally constructed in Kyoto in 1457 and relocated in 1914, and the Former Yanohara House (旧矢箆原家住宅), originally the private residence of the Yanohara family.

Work on the garden started in 1902 and ended in 1908, two years after it was opened to the public. During Hara's own lifetime, the place became an aggregation point for Meiji period artists. World War II caused great damage to the buildings. In 1953 the garden was donated by the Hara family to the City of Yokohama, which created the Sankeien Hoshōkai Foundation for its repair and maintenance. The Foundation started the restoration in 1953 and, five years later, the garden was back almost to its original form and reopened to the public.

The Japanese government has designated ten structures in Sankei-en as Important Cultural Properties, while three more are Tangible Cultural Properties designated by the City of Yokohama. The garden is popular for its cherry blossoms, ume blossoms, and the changing leaves in autumn.

=== Kakushōkaku ===
Next to the entrance, the Kakushōkaku (鶴翔閣) was formerly the private residence of the Hara family. Today it can be rented by the public and used for meetings and parties. It is one of the three buildings on the premises designated as Tangible Cultural Properties by the City of Yokohama. Only during the summer, the Kakushōkaku is open to the public.

=== Sankei Memorial ===
Located immediately after the Kakushōkaku, the Sankei Memorial (三溪記念館, Sankei Kinenkan) was built to introduce the public to the garden and its creator through exhibits, images and works of art. A Gifu Prefecture native, Hara was the eldest son of Yanaizuchō village's headman. From childhood he liked and studied the fine arts, Sinology and poetry, finally beginning formal studies in 1885 in what is now Tokyo's Waseda University. After graduation, he became a teacher at the Atomi School for Girls. Born Aoki, he changed it later after marrying one of his students and being adopted by her family. He became the head of the family trading business and was very successful. After moving to Sankei-en's present location in Honmoku, he started collecting old buildings, rebuilding them in his garden. He then decided to open the garden to the public for free in 1906.

=== Outer Garden ===
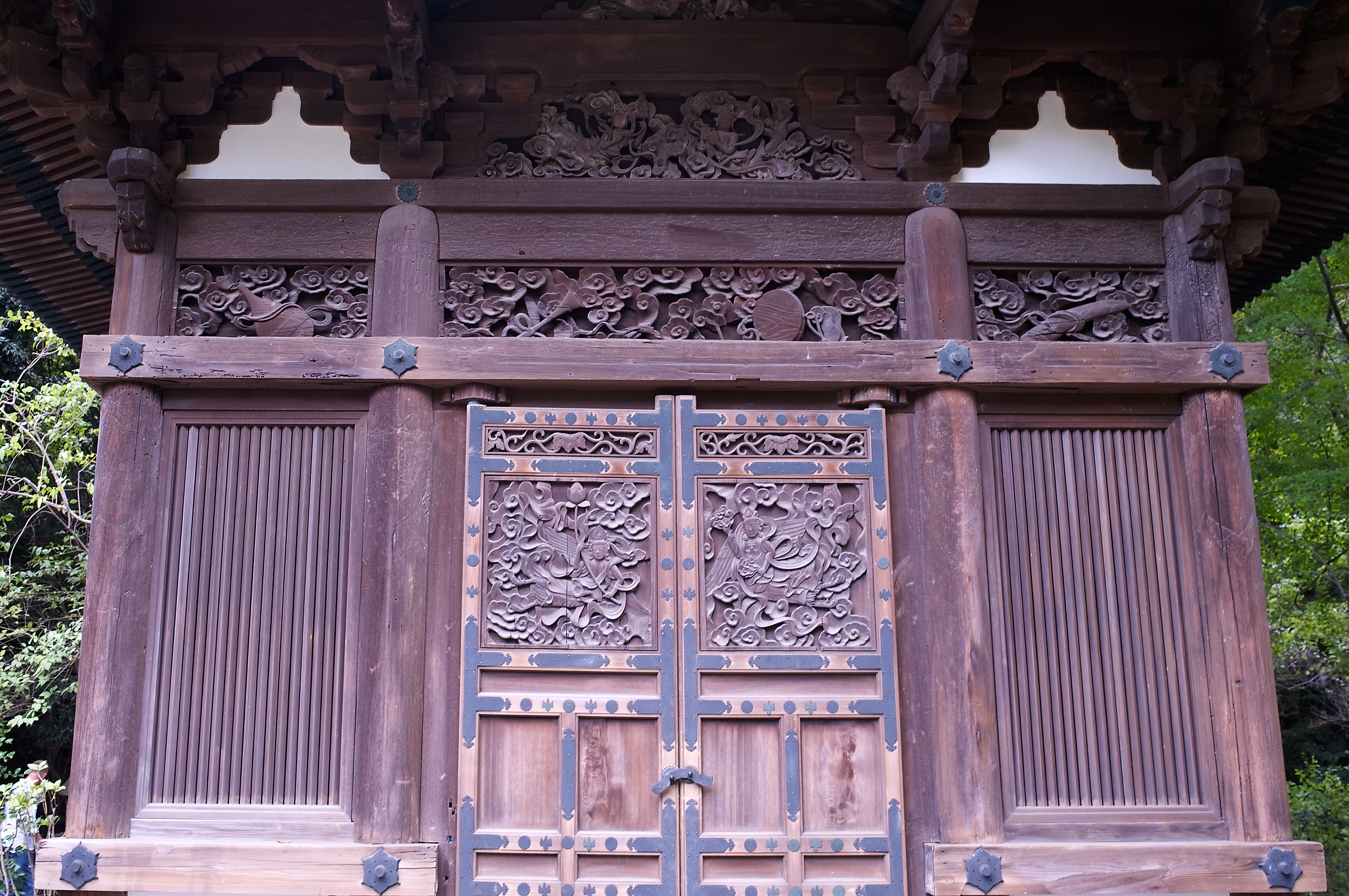
Tenzui-ji's former Jutō Ōidō

The Outer Garden, that is, the area next to the Main Pond, was the first part of the garden to open to the public in 1906. The buildings it contains are the former Tōmyō-ji three-storied pagoda, a tea room called Rindō-an (林洞庵), a tea hut called Yokobue-an (横笛庵), Tōkei-ji's former butsuden (旧東慶寺仏殿, Kyū-Tōkei-ji butsuden) and Tōmyō-ji's former hon-dō (Main Hall) (旧燈明寺本堂, Kyū-Tōmyō-ji hon-dō).

Tōmyō-ji's former main hall (Important National Cultural Property) was brought here from Kyoto and is an example of Muromachi period (1336–1557) architecture. Bought in 1988, it was completely restored with intensive work of restoration and reconstruction that lasted five years.

Tōmyō-ji's former three-storied pagoda (Important National Cultural Property) is visible from any point of the garden and is its symbol. It was moved to Sankei-en in 1914.

Tōkei-ji's former butsuden (Important National Cultural Property) used to be the main hall of a Rinzai Zen temple in Kamakura. Its structure and name are typical of that sect. It was bought and moved to Sankei-en in 1907.

==== Former Yanohara House ====
The Former Yanohara House (旧矢箆原家住宅, Kyū-Yanohara-ke Shūtaku) (Important National Cultural Property) used to be the private home of an Edo period (1603–1868) wealthy family, the Yanohara. It is the only building whose interior is open to the public all year. It was brought here from Gifu Prefecture's Shirakawago, an area listed among the World Heritage sites. The house contains the original hearth, bathroom and kitchen used by the Yanohara. The second floor houses an exhibition of Japanese folk articles.

=== Inner Garden ===
The Inner Garden, north of the Main Pond, was opened to the public in 1958, and was until then the Hara family's private garden. Its buildings are the Gomon Gate (御門) (Tangible Cultural Property), the Hakuun-tei (白雲邸) (Tangible Cultural Property), the Rinshunkaku (臨春閣), Tenzui-ji's former Jutō Ōidō (旧天瑞寺寿塔覆堂, Kyū-Tenzui-ji Jutō Ōidō), the Shunsōro (春草廬), the Kinmokutsu (金毛窟), the Gekkaden (月華殿), the Tenju-in (天授院), the Chōshūkaku (聴秋閣), and the Renge-in. Only during the summer, the Rinshunkaku and the Hakuun-tei are open to the public.

Of particular value is the Rinshunkaku (Important National Cultural Property, see photo below), formerly belonging to the Kii House of Tokugawa. It is often compared in beauty to the World famous Katsura Imperial Villa in Kyoto. Originally the summer residence of Tokugawa Yorinobu, the first head of the Kii House, it used to stand in Iwade, Wakayama prefecture. Acquired by Hara in 1906, it was rebuilt over a period of three years between 1915 and 1917. Divided in three sections, it was decorated by famous artists Kanō Tanyū and Kanō Yasunobu. The transoms between pavilions are decorated with sculpted waves (first pavilion) and special paper containing poetry (second pavilion). The third pavilion's transom is decorated with real gagaku instruments like shō and flutes.

The Gekkaden (Important National Cultural Property) was built in 1603 by Ieyasu, the first of the Tokugawa shōguns within Kyoto's Fushimi Castle. It was bought in 1918 together with the Shunsōro and moved to Sankei-en. Hara then connected it to a pavilion he built, the Kinmokutsu. The paintings on the room partitions are attributed to Momoyama period artist Kaihō Yūshō. The Gekkaden can be rented by the public.

The Tenju-in (Important National Cultural Property) was originally a Jizō-dō in Kita-Kamakura near the great Kenchō-ji Zen temple and was bought in 1916. Tenju-in was Hara's Jibutsu-dō (持仏堂), the temple which enshrined his tutelary gods.

Tenzui-ji's former Jutō Ōi-dō (Important National Cultural Property, see image above) was built in 1591 by Toyotomi Hideyoshi as a resting place for his mother, and is one of the few extant buildings attributable with certainty to him.

The construction of the Chōshūkaku (Important National Cultural Property, see photo below) is traditionally attributed to Iemitsu, third of the Tokugawa shōguns. The pavilion is open to the public in spring and in November for the traditional viewing of the autumn colors.

The Shunsōro (Important National Cultural Property) is a tea room believed to have been built for Oda Urakusai, brother of the more famous Oda Nobunaga. Urakusai was a well-known practitioner of the tea ceremony.

== Gallery ==
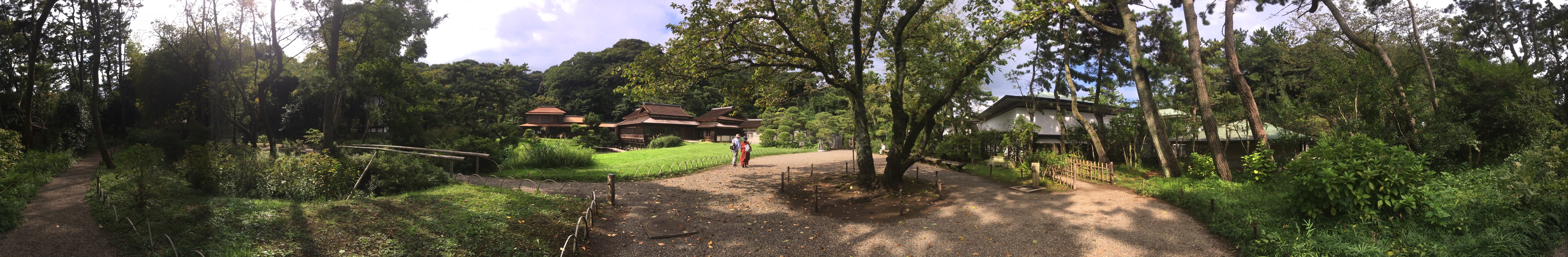
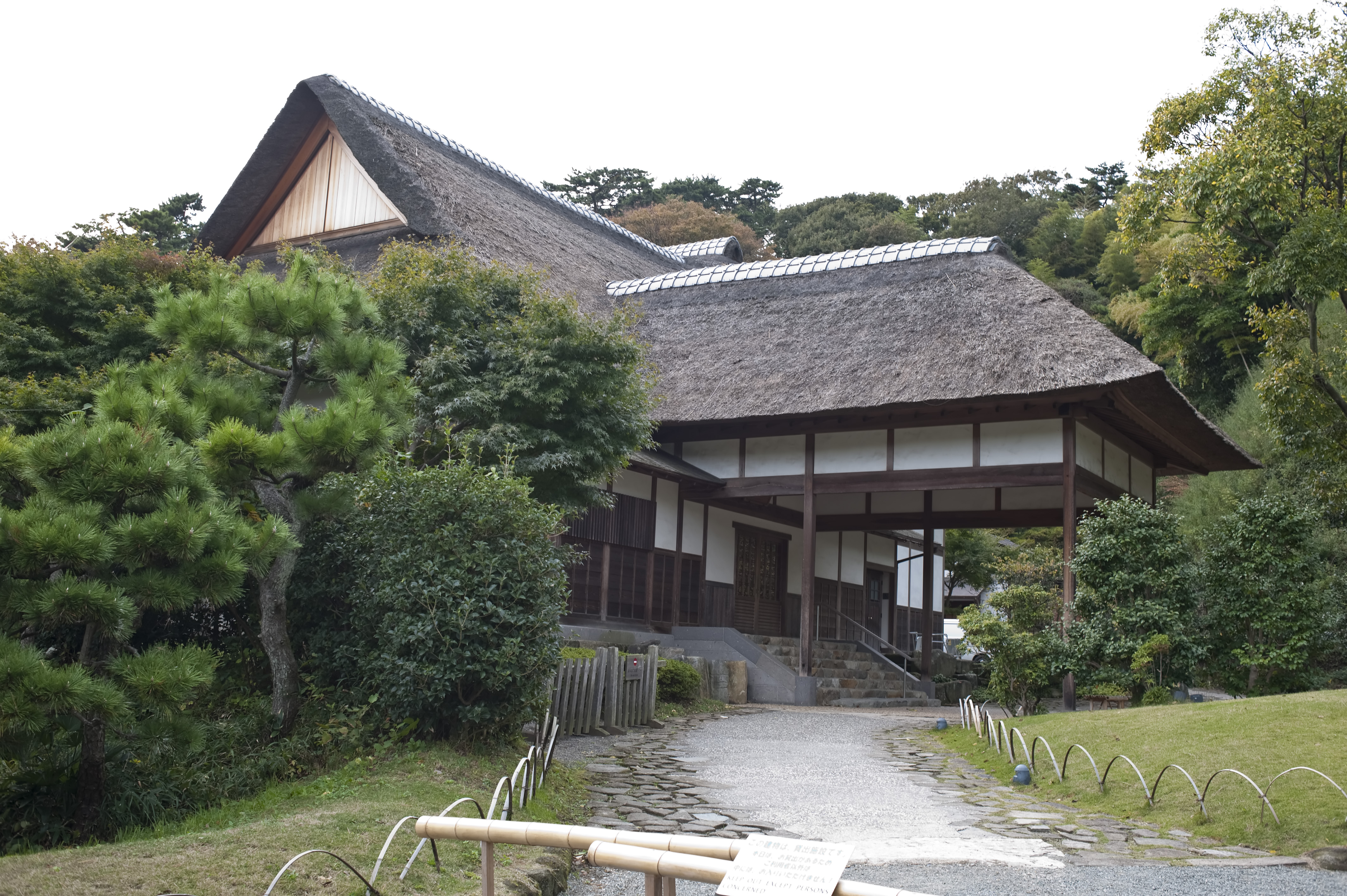
The Kakushokaku

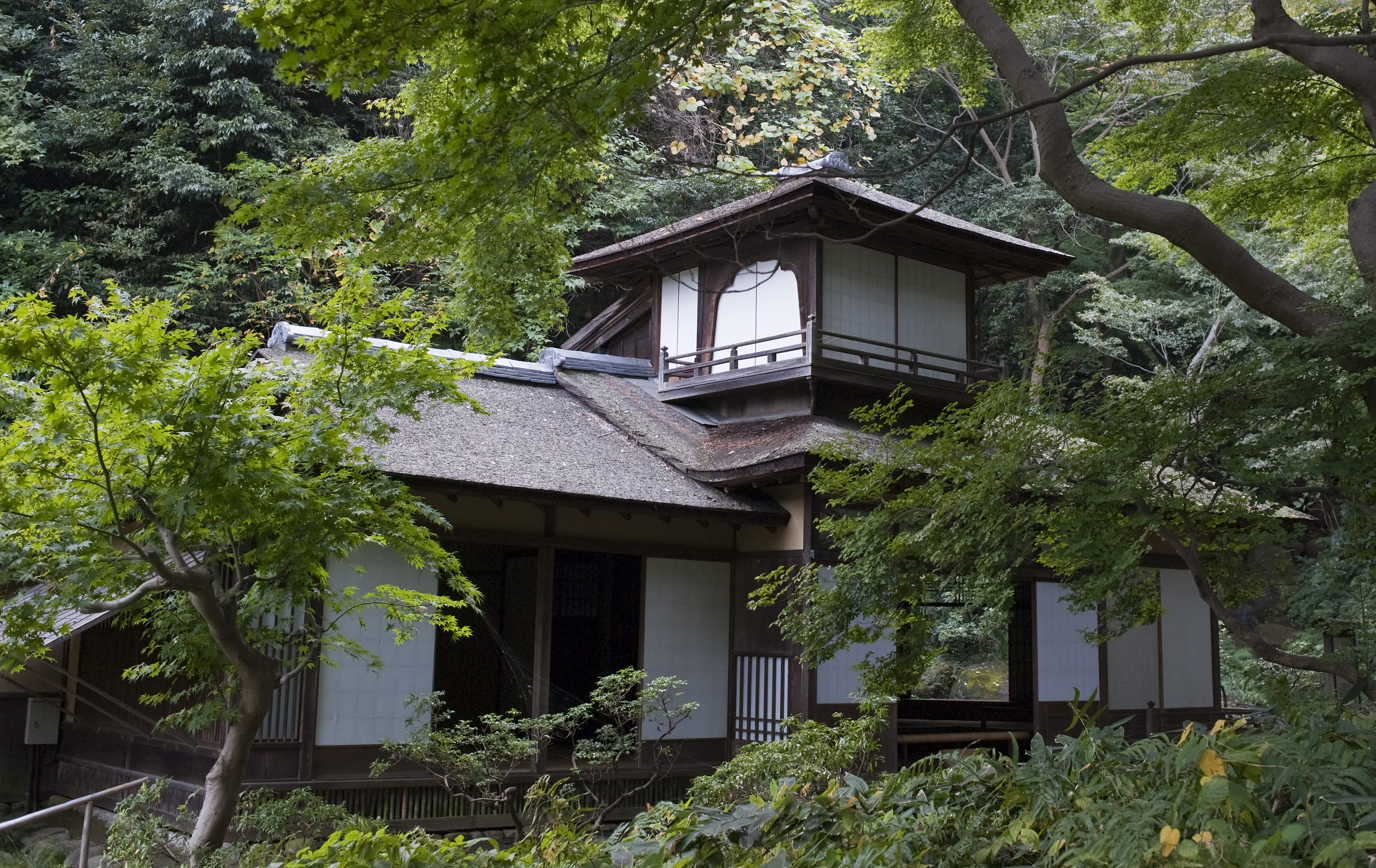
The Chōshūkaku

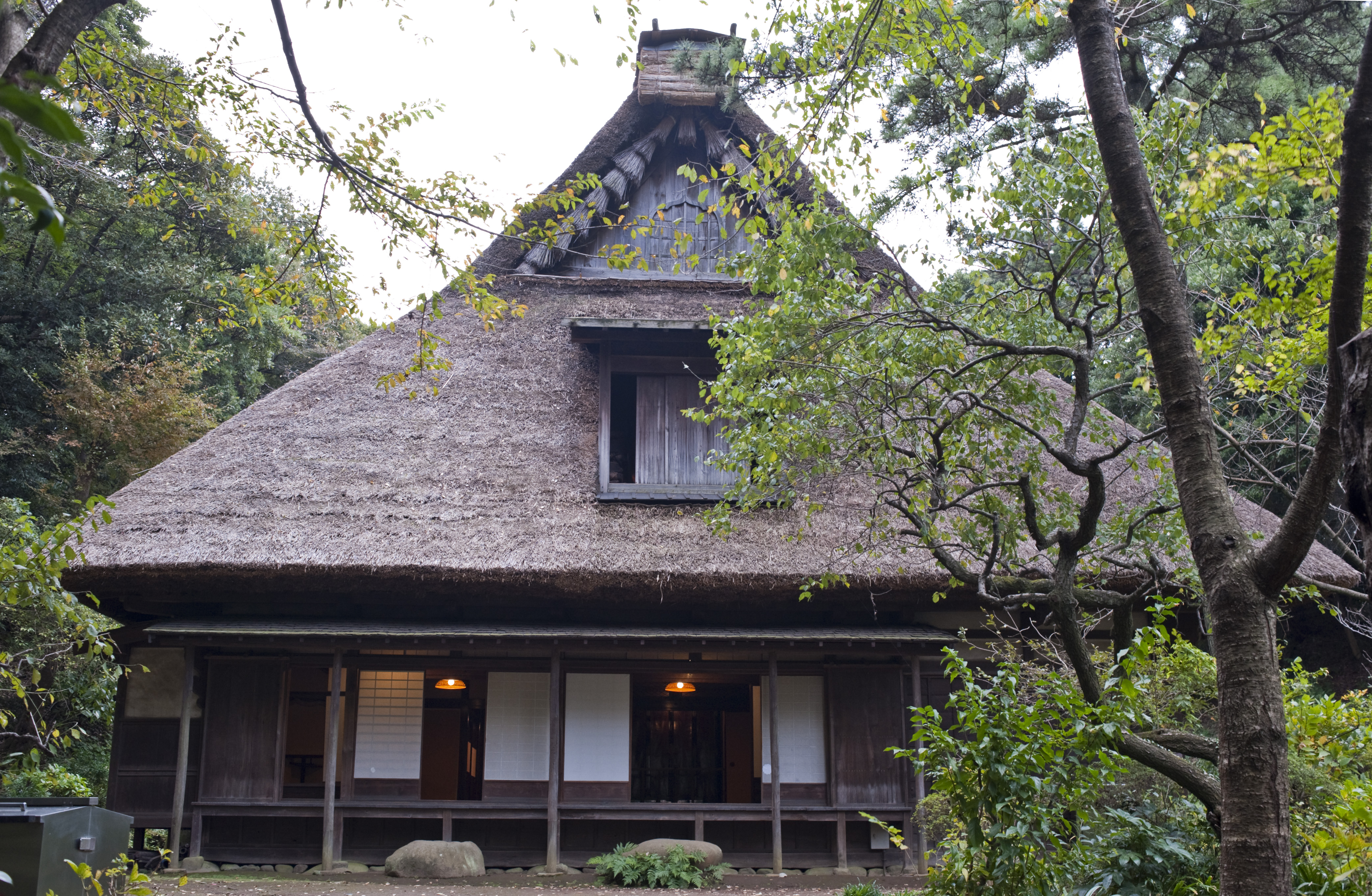
The Old Yanohara House

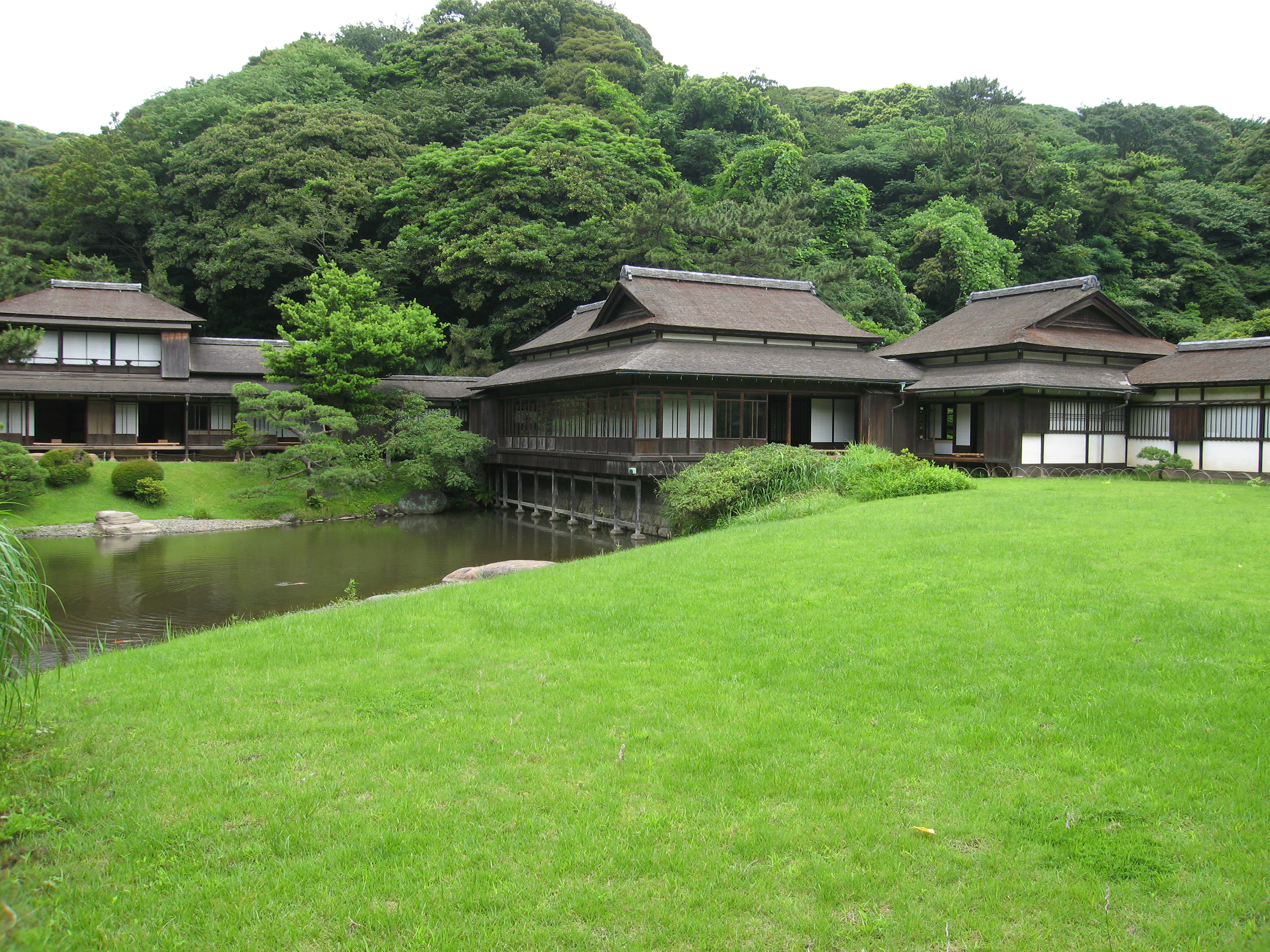
Rinshunkaku

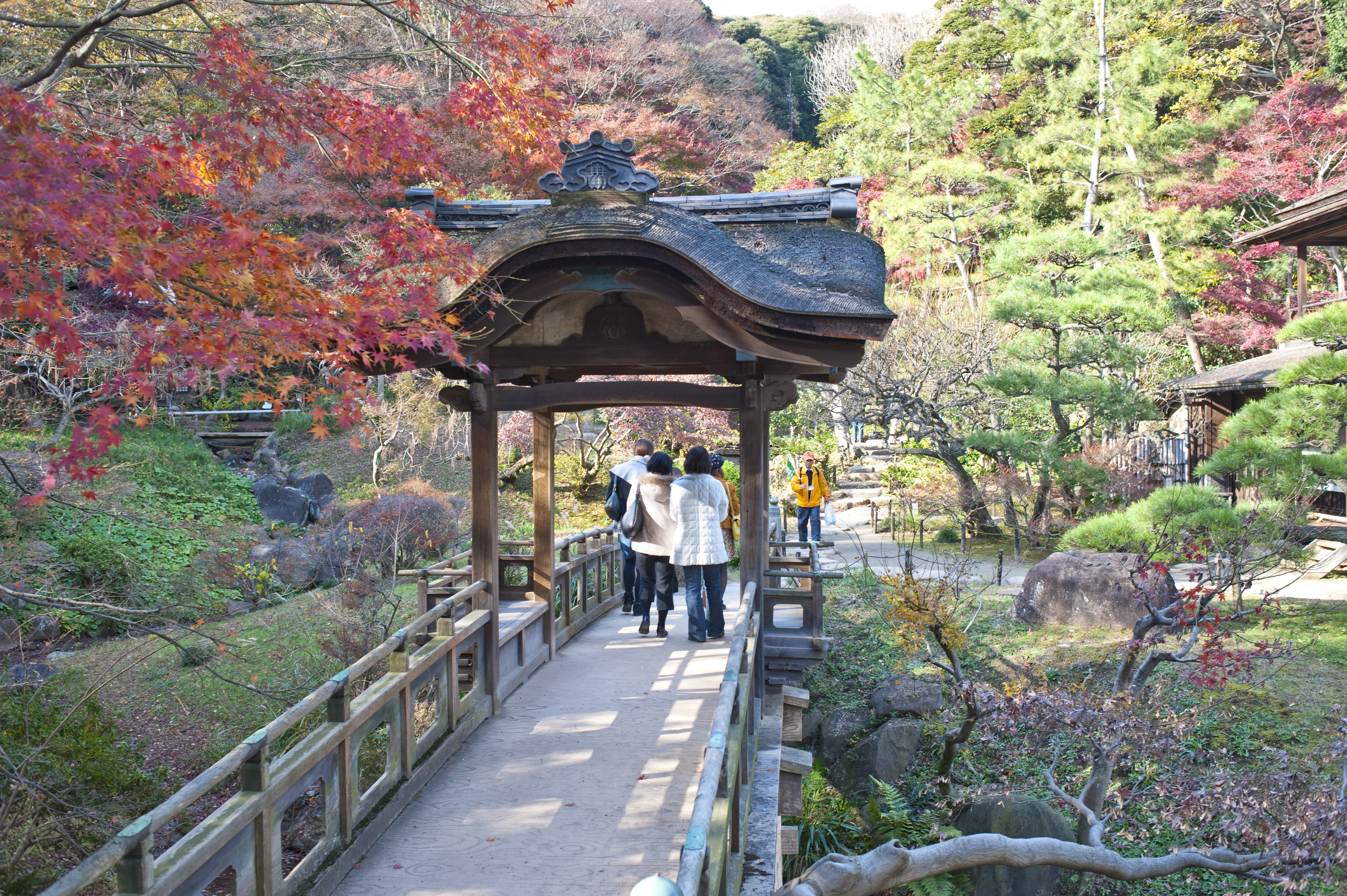
Autumn foliage

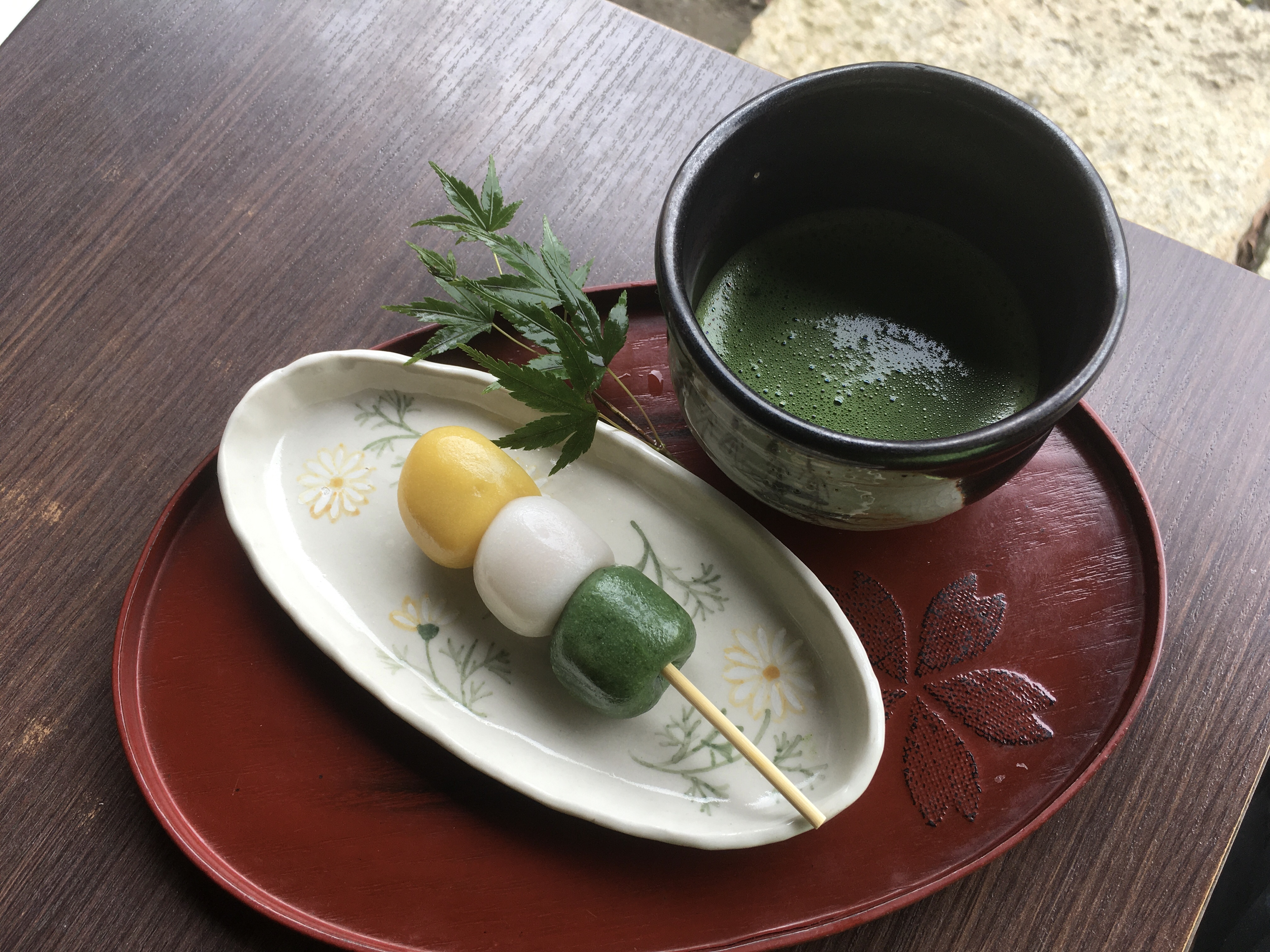
Matcha and dango

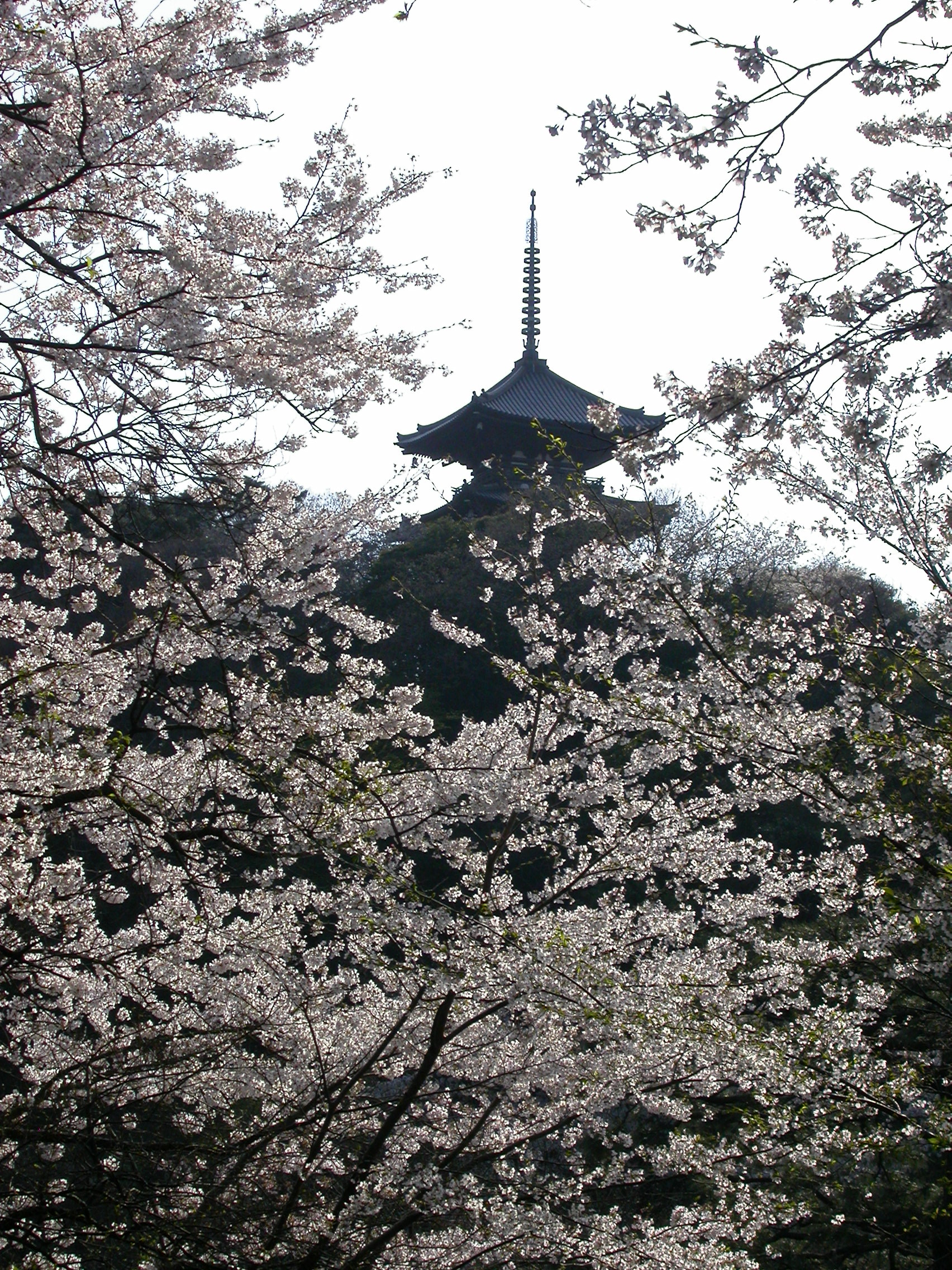
The pagoda in spring

A few scenes from the garden in late summer, 2021

== See also ==
- Ōzone Oshitayashiki
- Katsura Imperial Villa
- Ma (negative space)
- Seven Horticultural Wonders of the World
