= Hagiyama ware =

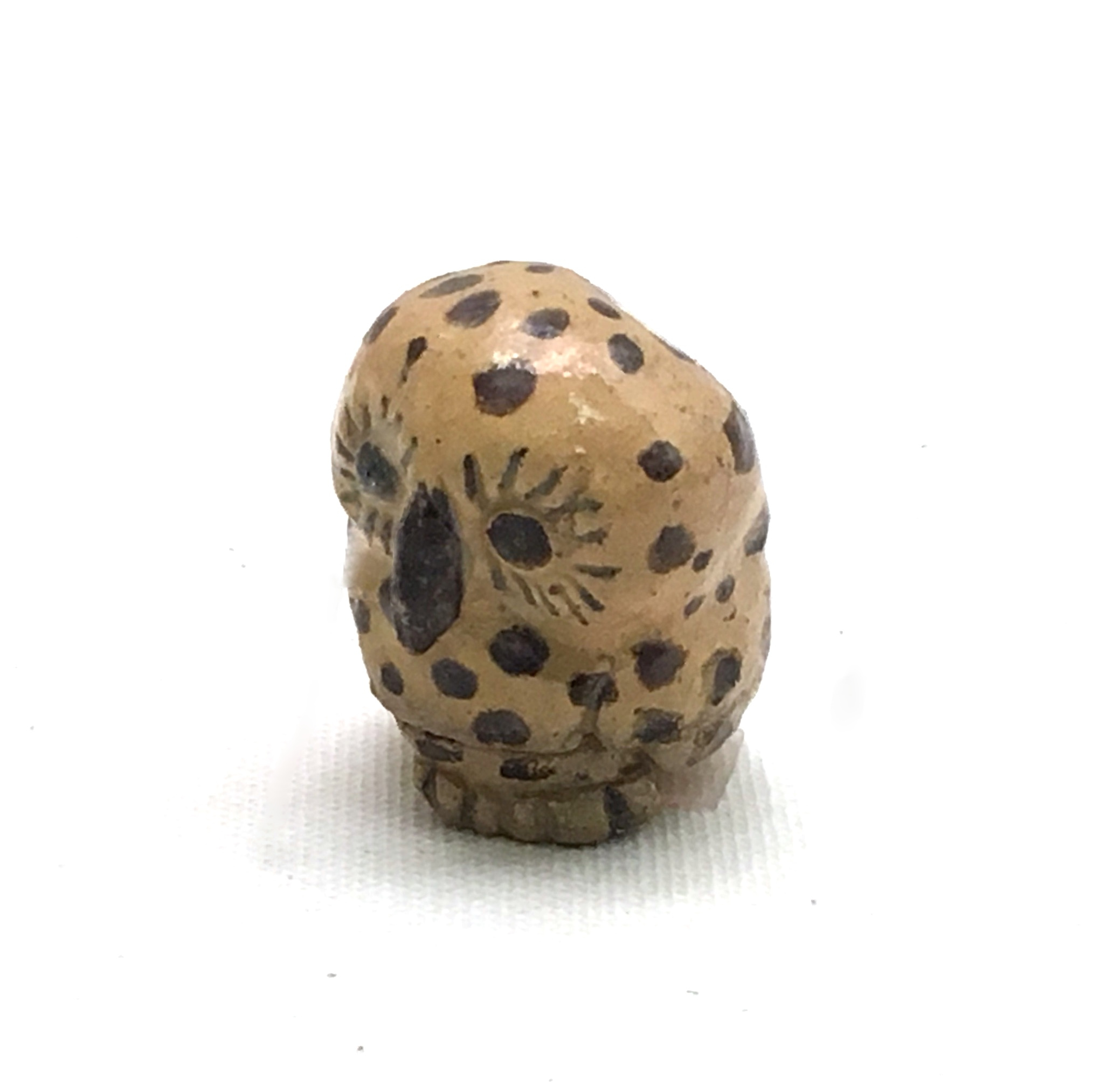
Hagiyama ware incense container in the shape of an owl, late Edo Period

Hagiyama ware (萩山焼) refers to a type of Japanese pottery that was originally produced in Nagoya, central Japan.

A dedicated Raku ware kiln was built in a garden on the north side of Nagoya Castle. It is called Hagiyama ware because the kiln was built on a small island called Hagishima (萩島) in an artificial pond of what is today Meijo Park. The kiln is thought to have opened after the retirement of the 10th lord of the domain, Tokugawa Naritomo, in 1827. The 12th lord, Tokugawa Naritaka (1810–1845), actively operated the kiln and had it produce tea utensils. Since he also invited Hōraku ware and Sasashima ware potters, there are many similarities in the types of vessels, clay and glaze.

Another pottery that was produced under the reign of the 12th lord was Kinjō Higashiyama ware.

== See also ==
Other pottery from Nagoya and the wider Owari region:

- Kawana ware
- Tokoname ware
- Inuyama ware
