= Tokugawa Tsugutomo =

Daimyo of Owari Domain (1692–1731)

Tokugawa Tsugutomo 徳川継友
- Born: March 25, 1692
- Died: January 5, 1731 (aged 38)
- Other names: Owari-Chūnagon
- Occupation: Daimyō
- Father: Tokugawa Tsunanari

Tokugawa Tsugutomo (徳川継友; March 25, 1692 – January 5, 1731) was daimyō of Owari Domain during mid-Edo period Japan.

== Biography ==
Tokugawa Tsugutomo was the 11th son of the 3rd daimyō of Owari Domain, Tokugawa Tsunanari by a concubine, who was a commoner, his childhood name was Hachisaburo (八三郎). He became 6th Tokugawa daimyō of Owari Domain on the unexpected death of his brother Tokugawa Yoshimichi, and Yoshimichi's son Tokugawa Gorōta in 1713. He was severely reprimanded by the domain's senior retainer, Takenokoshi Masatake, for having thrown a celebratory party immediately on his succession, ignoring the customary mourning period.

Tsugutomo was awarded lower 4th Court Rank and the ceremonial position of Captain of the Left Guards on January 11, 1713, and was promoted to 3rd Court Rank and was given a kanji from the name of Shōgun Tokugawa Ietsugu. He advanced to the ceremonial post of Chūnagon on December 26, 1715.

Whereas his predecessor, Yoshimichi, had enjoyed the high regard of the 6th shōgun Tokugawa Ienobu, Tsugutomo was viewed with suspicion by senior shogunal retainers Manabe Akifusa and Arai Hakuseki, as Tsugutomo had the closest claim by direct descent to the position of shōgun, and the 7th shōgun Tokugawa Ietsugu had no heirs. Tsugutomo's position was also bolstered by the fact that his official wife was the daughter of the kampaku Konoe Iehiro, with ties to the powerful faction led by Tenei-in within the Ōoku of Edo Castle. Despite his blood ties and political connections, Tsugutomo was bypassed by the shogunal succession, and Tokugawa Yoshimune from Kii Domain was selected to become 8th shōgun instead.

Tsugutomo was noted for his fiscal acuity from an early age, and reformed the finances of Owari Domain. He also supported Yoshimune's Kyōhō Reforms, which left the domain with a very considerable fiscal surplus. The castle town of Nagoya prospered under his administration, increasing in population, and attracting merchants such as Echigoya from Edo.

Tsugutomo died on January 5, 1731, without an heir (his only son, by a concubine, having died in infancy). The leadership of the domain passed to his younger half-brother, the 19th son of Tokugawa Tsunanari, Tokugawa Muneharu. Tsugutomo's grave is at the Owari Tokugawa clan temple of Kenchū-ji in Nagoya.

== Family ==
- Father: Tokugawa Tsunanari
- Mother: Izumi later Senkoin
- Wife: Konoe Yasuko
- Concubine: Ukyo no Kata
- Son: Hachisaburo by Ukyo

Preceded by Tokugawa Gorōta	Daimyō of Owari; 1713–1730	Succeeded by Tokugawa Muneharu
