= Chiyohime =

Daughter of Tokugawa Iemitsu

- 霊仙院 / 千代姫
- Born: April 29, 1637
- Died: January 10, 1699 (aged 61)
- Resting place: Zōjō-ji temple
- Era: Edo
- Spouse: Tokugawa Mitsutomo
- Children: 2, including Tokugawa Tsunanari
- Father: Tokugawa Iemitsu
- Relatives: Tokugawa Ietsuna (brother), Tokugawa Tsunashige (brother), Tokugawa Tsunayoshi (brother)

Chiyohime (千代姫; 29 April 1637 – 10 January 1699) was Tokugawa Iemitsu's daughter with his concubine, Ofuri no Kata (died 1640), daughter of Oka Shigemasa, also known as Jishō'in. After Ofuri died, Chiyohime was adopted by Iemitsu's concubine, Oman no Kata (1624-1711), later Keishoin. She was married to Tokugawa Mitsutomo, daimyō of Owari Domain, in 1640, when she was 2 years and 6 months old and Mitsutomo was fourteen. In 1652, she constructed a mausoleum for her mother named Jishō'in Mausoleum, which is now located in Edo-Tokyo Open Air Architectural Museum. She died in 1699 and was given the name Reisen'in (霊仙院).

Chiyohime was Iemitsu's eldest daughter and was considered his favourite daughter as well. As a toddler, she became gravely ill. Her father, who had long been personally involved with Mantoku-ji in Kōzuke Province as a patron, appointed the Mantoku-ji rector, Shunchō, to perform the rituals to heal his daughter. After Chiyohime survived, Shunchō and the other nuns gained great popularity among the women in the shogun's household.

The surviving remnants of the bridal trousseau for Chiyohime's marriage to Mitsutomo is preserved in the Tokugawa Art Museum in Nagoya.

== Family ==
- Father: Tokugawa Iemitsu
- Mother: Ofuri no Kata (died 1640)
- Adopted Mother: Oman no Kata (1624-1711), later Eikō'in
- Husband: Tokugawa Mitsutomo
- Children:
  - Tokugawa Tsunanari (1652-1699)
  - Matsudaira Yoshiyuki (1656-1715)
  - Toyohime (b.1655)
  - Naohime (1658-1661)
