= Tokugawa Tsunanari =

Daimyo

Tokugawa Tsunanari 徳川 綱誠
- Born: September 4, 1652
- Died: July 1, 1699 (aged 46)
- Other names: Owari-Chūnagon
- Occupation: Daimyō
- Children: Tokugawa Yoshimichi; Tokugawa Tsugutomo; Tokugawa Muneharu
- Parent(s): Tokugawa Mitsutomo; Chiyohime

Tokugawa Tsunanari (徳川 綱誠; September 4, 1652 – July 1, 1699) was daimyō of Owari Domain during early-Edo period Japan.

== Biography ==
Tokugawa Tsunanari was the son of the second daimyō of Owari Domain, Tokugawa Mitsutomo by his official wife, Chiyohime later Reisen-in, the daughter of shōgun Tokugawa Iemitsu. Although Mitsutomo's second son, he was given the position of first son and heir over his elder brother, who had been born to a concubine. He undertook his genpuku ceremony under Shogun Tokugawa Ietsuna on April 5, 1657, and was given the adult name of the "Tsunayoshi". He changed his name to "Tsunanari" to avoid confusion with an uncle of the same name who was daimyō of Tatebayashi Domain. His childhood name was Gorota (五郎太).

On the retirement of his father on April 27, 1693, Tsunanari became the 3rd Tokugawa daimyō of Owari Domain, with 3rd court rank and the courtesy title of Chūnagon. Although officially daimyō, all power remained in the hands of his retired father and Tsunanari spent most of his time in various scholarly pursuits, including starting work on a comprehensive history of Owari Province in 1698. In addition to his official wife (a daughter of court noble Hirohata Tadayki), Tsunanari had 16 concubines, by whom he had a total of 40 children (22 male, 18 female).

Tsunanari died on July 1, 1699, by eating a tainted strawberry, and was succeeded by his 10th son, Tokugawa Yoshimichi. He was posthumously awarded 2nd Court Rank and the courtesy title of Dainagon. His grave is at the Owari Tokugawa clan temple of Kenchū-ji in Nagoya.

== Family ==
- Father: Tokugawa Mitsutomo
- Mother: Tokugawa Chiyohime, daughter of the third shōgun Tokugawa Iemitsu
- Wife: Shinko, daughter of Hirohata Tadayuki
- Concubines:
  - Ofuku no Kata later Honjuin (1665–1739)
  - Izumi later Senkoin
  - Karahashi-dono
  - Umezu later Senyoin
  - Oyae no Kata
  - Osano no Kata
  - Kono-dono
  - Umekoji-dono
  - Odan no Kata
  - Otsu no Kata
  - Tatsuko no Kata
  - Renjoin
  - Oako no Kata
  - Oman no Kata
  - Kurahashi-dono
  - Takahita-dono
- Children:
  - Gorohachi (1676–1678) by Oyae
  - Gen'nosuke (1678–1678) by Osano
  - Etsuhime (1679–1681) by Kono
  - Tsurumaru (1680–1680) by Umekoji
  - Matsunosuke (1682–1683) by Umekoji
  - Kikuhime (1684–1685) by Umekoji
  - Kitaro (1686–1687) by Umekoji
  - Ayahime (1692–1694) by Umekoji
  - Bomaru (1693–1693) by Umekoji
  - Masahime (1695–1695) by Umekoji
  - Hatsuhime (1683–1683) by Odan
  - Hachihime (1684–1684) by Otsu
  - Kiyohime (1684–1684) by Tatsuko
  - Haruhime (1685–1868) by Renjoin
  - Daizen (1688–1691) by Renjoin
  - Mitsuhime (1690–1691) by Renjoin
  - Kametaro (1687–1692) by Senkoin
  - Tsunesaburo (1688–1691) by Senkoin
  - Tsutahime (1688–1688) by Honjuin
  - Tokugawa Yoshimichi by Honjuin
  - Itsuhime (1691–1696) by Honjuin
  - Iwanosuke (1694–1705) by Honjuin
  - Naohime (1688–1689) by Oako
  - Harunosuke (1694–1705) by Oako
  - Ishimatsu (1692–1694) by Oako
  - Yorihime (1692–1694) by Oman
  - Chojiro (1694–1697) by Senyoin
  - Bohime (1698–1698) by Senyoin
  - Sennosuke (1696–1697) by Kurahashi
  - Fukuhime (1698–1700) by Kurahashi
  - Tokugawa Tsugutomo by Senkoin
  - Matsudaira Yoshitaka (1694–1732) by Karahashi
  - Matsudaira Michimasa (1696–1730) by Karahashi
  - Tokugawa Muneharu by Senyoin
  - Kichihime (1697–1701) by Karahashi and adopted by the fifth shōgun Tokugawa Tsunayoshi
  - Matsuhime married Maeda Yoshinori by Kurahashi and adopted by the fifth shōgun Tokugawa Tsunayoshi
  - Tonosuke (1699–1699) by Takahita

| Preceded by Tokugawa Mitsutomo | Daimyō of Owari; 1693–1699 | Succeeded by Tokugawa Yoshimichi |
