= Tokugawa Mitsutomo =

- 徳川 光友
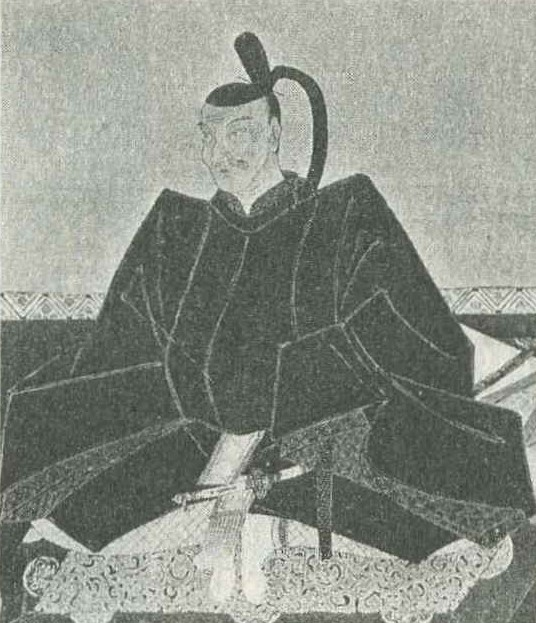

Personal details
- Born: August 31, 1625 Nagoya, Owari Province, Japan
- Died: November 26, 1700 (aged 75)
- Spouse: Chiyohime
- Children: Tokugawa Tsunanari
- Parent: Tokugawa Yoshinao (father)
- Occupation: Daimyō
- Nickname: Owari-Dainagon

Tokugawa Mitsutomo (徳川 光友; August 31, 1625 – November 26, 1700) was daimyō of Owari Domain during early Edo period Japan.

== Biography ==
Tokugawa Mitsutomo was the eldest son of the first daimyō of Owari Domain, Tokugawa Yoshinao by a concubine. He undertook his genpuku ceremony under Shōgun Tokugawa Iemitsu on May 3, 1630, and was given the adult name of the "Mitsuyoshi", which included the same kanji "Mitsu" as the Shōgun. As a further sign of favor, his official wife, Chiyohime later Reisen-in, was also the daughter of shōgun Tokugawa Iemitsu. His childhood name was Gorōta (五郎太).

On the death of his father on June 28, 1650, he became the 2nd Tokugawa daimyō of Owari Domain, with lower 3rd court rank and the courtesy title of Captain of the Right Imperial Guards. He completed the clan mortuary temple of Kenchu-ji the following year, and was raised to upper 3rd court rank and Chūnagon on August 12, 1653.

On November 1, 1671, he formally changed his name to "Mitsutomo". On May 4, 1690, he received the courtesy title of Dainagon, and a week later was awarded 2nd Court Rank. On April 25, 1693, he officially retired, turning his offices and position as clan heed to his son, Tokugawa Tsunanari; however, although officially retired, he continued to wield all political power using his son's name, until his son's death on July 1, 1699. During this period, he lived at the Ōzone Oshitayashiki, a palatial palace with extensive gardens some distance from Nagoya Castle. He also had the Aoi Oshitayashiki constructed.

In addition to his official wife (a daughter of Shōgun Tokugawa Iemitsu), Mitsutomo had at least 10 official concubines, by whom he had 17 children (11 male, 6 female).

Noted for his accomplishments in the Japanese tea ceremony and Japanese calligraphy, Mitsutomo was especially noted as a master of the Shinkage-ryū style of Japanese swordsmanship, having been taught by the Owari Yagyū clan. He proved so adept that he was named the 6th sōke by Yagyū Toshikane, and added a number of teaching concepts to the ryū.

His grave is at the Owari Tokugawa clan temple of Kenchū-ji in Nagoya.

== Family ==
- Father: Tokugawa Yoshinao
- Mother: Ojo no Kata or Yoshida-dono
- Wife: Tokugawa Chiyohime, daughter of Tokugawa Iemitsu
- Concubines:
  - Higuchi-dono
  - Seshin'in
  - Iyo-dono
  - Ohisa no Kata
  - Oito no Kata
  - Otei no Kata
  - Otsune no Kata
  - Ofuchi no kata
  - Umeda-dono
  - Kimura-dono
- Children:
  - Tokugawa Tsunanari by Chiyohime
  - Matsudaira Yoshiyuki (1656–1715) by Chiyohime
  - Toyohime (b.1655) by Chiyohime
  - Naohime (1658–1661) by Chiyohime
  - Matsudaira Yoshimasa (1651–1713) by Higuchi
  - Matsudaira Yasunaga (1661–1675) by Seishin'in
  - Atehime (1666–1683) married Asano Tsunanaga by Seishin'in
  - Senosuke (b.1676) by Seishin'in
  - Hachirotaro (1668–1669) by Iyo
  - Matsudaira Tomoshige (1669–1702) by Iyo
  - Chotakeru by Iyo
  - Hidehime (b.1673) by Ohiya
  - Nohime (b.1674) by Oito
  - Mannosuke (1676–1681) by Otei
  - Mannanosuke (b.1678) by Otsune
  - Kannosuke (b.1677) by Ofuchi
  - Matsudaira Tomoaki (1678–1728) by Umeda
  - Motohime (1679–1690) by Kimura

Preceded by Tokugawa Yoshinao	2nd (Tokugawa) daimyō of Owari; 1650–1693	Succeeded by Tokugawa Tsunanari
