= Tokugawa Gorōta =

Japanese daimyō

Tokugawa Gorōta 徳川五郎太
- Born: February 25, 1711
- Died: December 5, 1713 (aged 2)
- Occupation: Daimyō
- Father: Tokugawa Yoshimichi

Tokugawa Gorōta (徳川 五郎太; February 25, 1711 – December 5, 1713) was a Japanese daimyō of the Edo period, who ruled the Owari Domain.

== Biography ==
Tokugawa Gorōta was the eldest son of the 4th daimyō of the Owari Domain, Tokugawa Yoshimichi, by his official wife, Zuishō-in, the daughter of the court noble Kujō Tsukezane. Gorōta was only two years old when his father died, and he followed only two months later at the age of three. The direct line of succession for the Owari Domain passed to his uncle, Tokugawa Tsugutomo. With his death, the paternal line of Tokugawa Yoshinao came to end.

He was posthumously elevated to 3rd Court Rank. His grave is at the Owari Tokugawa clan temple of Kenchū-ji in Nagoya.

Preceded by Tokugawa Yoshimichi	5th (Tokugawa) daimyō of Owari; 1713	Succeeded by Tokugawa Tsugutomo
