= Daimyō collection =

Type of Japanese museum collection

A daimyō collection is a collection mostly of the property or former property of daimyō, or feudal aristocrat families of Japan, which are now open to the public. They typically contain traditional Japanese, and some Chinese, art objects.

- Tokugawa Art Museum, Nagoya, opened in 1935 and is supported by the Tokugawa Reimeikai Foundation of Tokyo. The collection holds more than 12,000 pieces including swords, armor, noh costumes and masks, lacquer furniture, Chinese and Japanese ceramics, calligraphy, paintings from the Chinese Song and Yuan dynasties (960–1368, and Heian period (794–1185) scrolls of The Tale of Genji. The Tokugawa Art Museum's collection originally was among the daimyō collection of Tokugawa Yoshichika (1886–1976), who was the 19th lord of Owari Province (now Aichi Prefecture). He was the descendant of the first lord of Owari, Tokugawa Yoshinao (1600–1650), the ninth son of the first Tokugawa shōgun, Tokugawa Ieyasu.
- Seisonkaku is a large Japanese-style villa built in the city of Kanazawa in 1863 by Maeda Nariyasu (1811–1884), daimyō of the region. A collection of the daimyō is open to the public. It is one of the few buildings in Japan to display the possessions of a daimyō family in their original surroundings.
- Matsuura Historical Museum in Hirado, Nagasaki Prefecture, opened in 1955. The collection holds household objects, paintings, calligraphy, and documents relating to the early foreign trade in the area. All items in the collection had once been the property of the Matsuura family, daimyō of Hirado. The items are on display in part of the family's former residence.
- Mōri Museum at Hōfu, Yamaguchi Prefecture, contains items belonging to the Mōri clan, daimyō of Suō Province. Included in the collection are paintings, including Sesshū Tōyō's famous landscape scroll of the four seasons. The collection also includes calligraphy, armor, and costumes. These items can be viewed in a former Mōri residence set in a large garden.
