= Seisonkaku =

Coordinates: 36°33′40″N 136°39′47″E

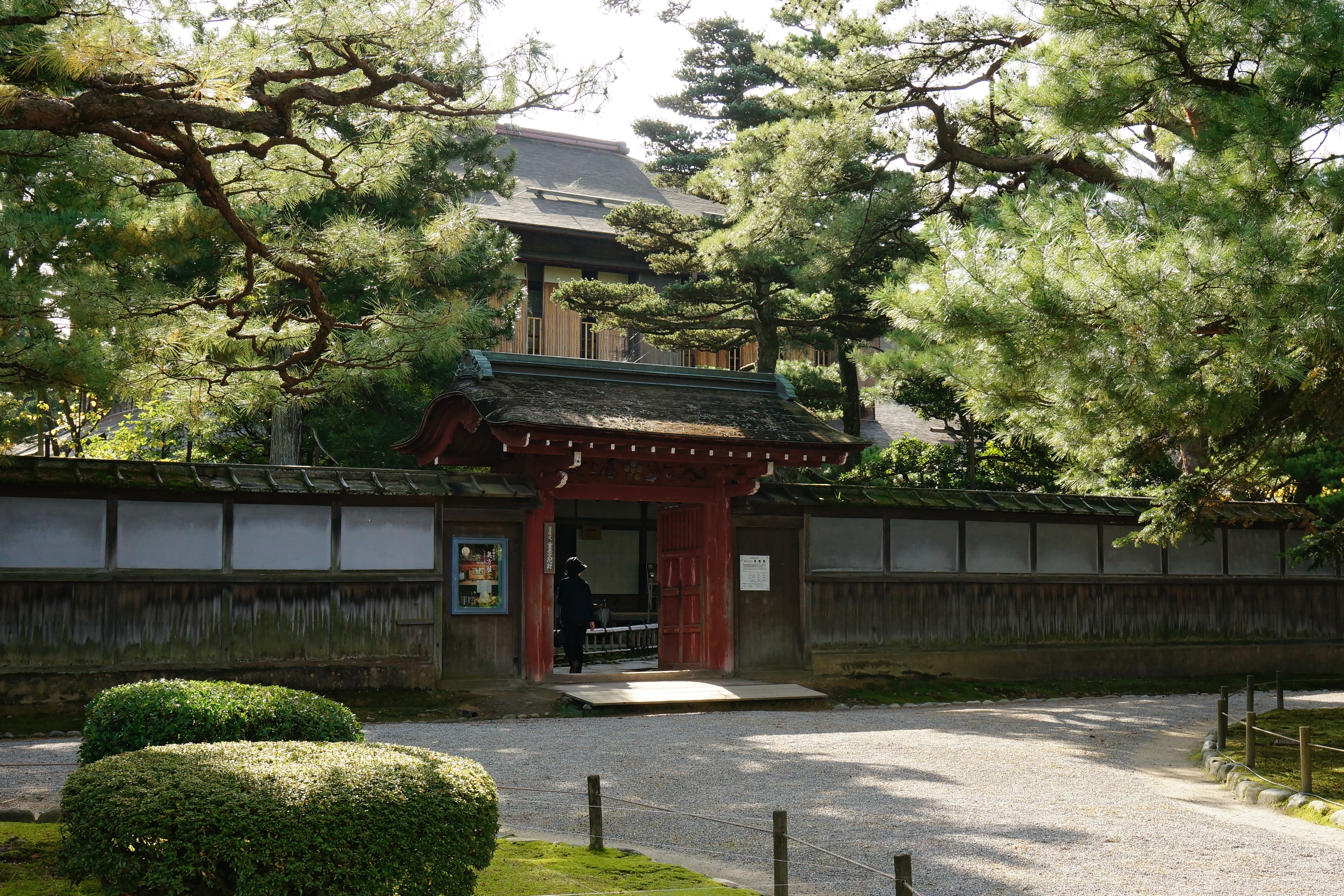
Akamon (the red gate)

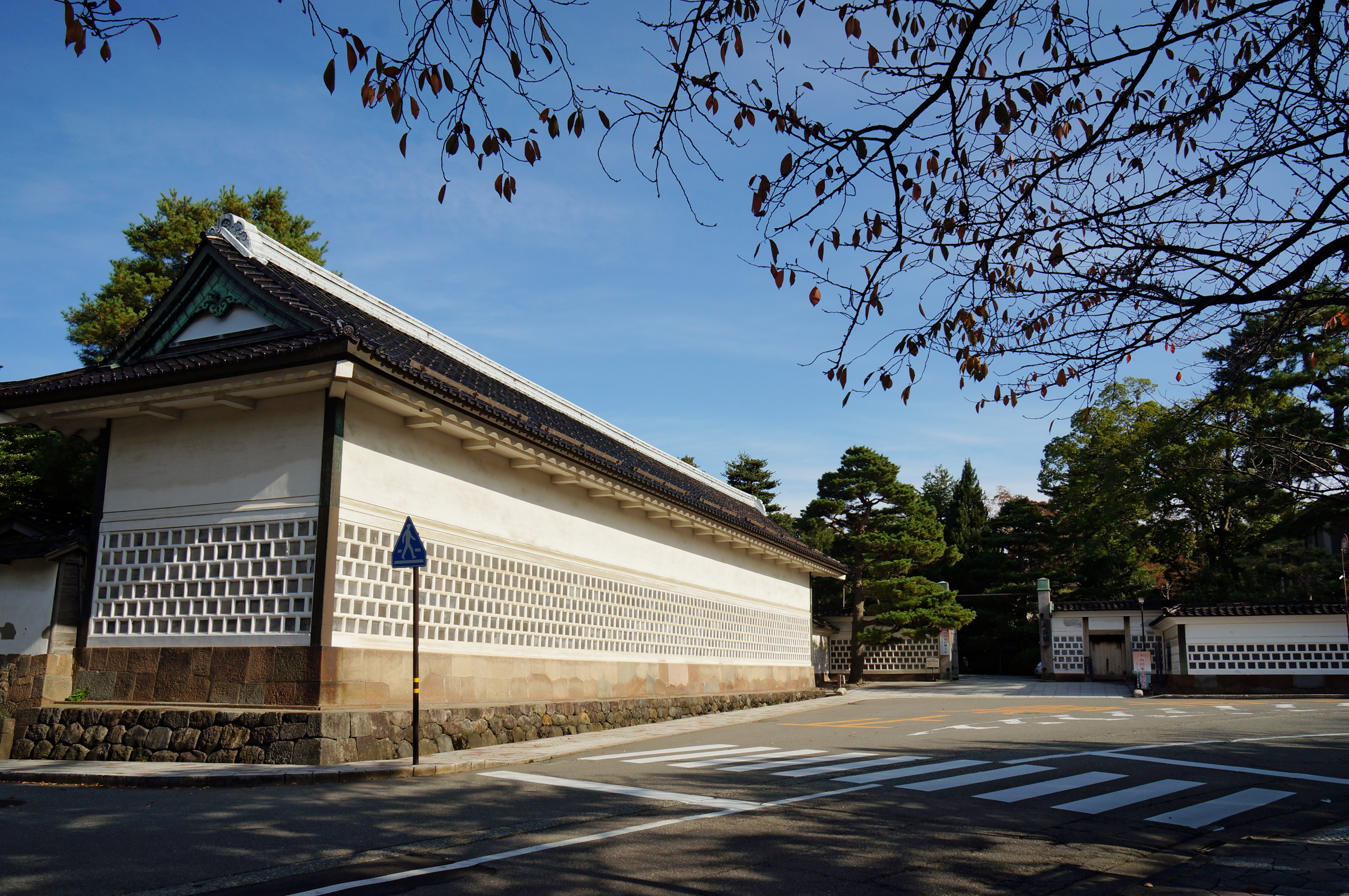
Tatsumi-nagaya and main gate

The Seisonkaku (成巽閣) is a large Japanese villa in the city of Kanazawa, built in 1863 by Maeda Nariyasu (1811–1884), 13th daimyō of the Kaga clan, as a retirement home for his mother Shinryu-in (眞龍院). A collection of her personal effects is open to the public.

== Collection ==
It is one of the few buildings in Japan to display the possessions of a daimyo family in their original surroundings.

== Architecture ==
The main floor is built in the buke-shoin (武家書院) style, with a formal guest chamber Ekken-no-ma (謁見の間), and a traditional covered walkway (engawa (縁側)) which opens onto a beautiful small garden. The walkway, named Horsetail corridor (つくしの廊下), is famous for being 20 meters long, with no supporting beams holding up the roof. The roof is supported with a cantilever that extends 10 meters back into the building, a Meiji-period architectural innovation. The first floor showcases extensive architectural uses of artwork, from painted screens and doors to stained glass imported from the Netherlands.

The second floor of the building is decorated in strong reds, blues and purples in the sukiya-shoin (数奇屋風書院) style. Some of the shōji screens on the second floor feature glass panes imported from the Netherlands, allowing snow viewing in wintertime without opening the screens.

== See also ==
- Daimyō collection
