= Tokugawa Yoshimichi =

Tokugawa Yoshimichi 徳川 吉通
- Born: October 29, 1689
- Died: September 15, 1713 (aged 23)
- Other names: Owari-Chūnagon
- Occupation: Daimyō
- Children: Tokugawa Gorota
- Father: Tokugawa Tsunanari

Tokugawa Yoshimichi (徳川 吉通; October 29, 1689 – September 15, 1713) was daimyō of Owari Domain during early-Edo period Japan.

== Biography ==
Tokugawa Yoshimichi was the 10th son of the 3rd daimyō of Owari Domain, Tokugawa Tsunanari by a concubine, Hōju-in, who was believed to have been a commoner. His childhood name was Matsudaira Yabutaro (松平藪太郎) later become Yoshito (吉郎) and changed again to Gorota (五郎太). On August 25, 1695, he was permitted to take the Tokugawa surname in place of Matsudaira, and in December of the same year was awarded with one kanji from Shōgun Tokugawa Tsunayoshi's name, lower 4th court rank and ceremonial court title of Captain of the Left Guards. On the death of his father in 1699, Yoshimichi officially became the 4th Tokugawa daimyō of Owari Domain with 3rd Court Rank, but since he was only age 11 at the time, his uncle Matsudaira Yoshiyuki served as regent, and he continued to reside at the Yotsuya residence of his mother in Edo until 1705. During this period, he studied Japanese martial arts, Confucianism, and Shinto, and later was considered to be a scholarly and wise ruler of Owari Province. He was awarded the title of Chūnagon on November 28, 1704. He was also ranked as the 8th master of the Yagyū Shinkage-ryū school of Japanese swordsmanship.

In addition to his official wife (a daughter of court noble Kujō Tsukezane) by whom he had a son, Yoshimichi had also had two concubines, by whom he had two daughters.

Yoshimichi died on July 26, 1713, under somewhat uncertain circumstances. It is known that he was held in high regard by Shōgun Tokugawa Ienobu, who approached Yoshimichi in 1712 with regards to his possible succession to the Tokugawa shogunate – a post for which he declared to have no desire or ambition. Plans for Yochimichi to either succeed Ienonu, or to act as regent for Ienobu's infant son were vehemently opposed by Ienobu's councilor, Arai Hakuseki. However, in May 1713, a plot by some of his retainers in Nagoya resulted in twelve sentences of death or seppuku, and Yoshimichi went into permanently secluded retirement back with his mother, Hōju-in, on July 21 of the same year. He died, reportedly of illness, less than five days later. His grave is at the Owari Tokugawa clan temple of Kenchū-ji in Nagoya.

== Family ==
- Father: Tokugawa Tsunanari
- Mother: Hoju-in (1665–1739)
- Wife: Kujō Sukehime later Zuishoin, daughter of Kujō Tsukezane
- Concubines
  - Osan no Kata
  - Onoue no Kata
- Children:
  - Tokugawa Gorota by Sukehime
  - Senhime married Kujo Yukinori by Osan
  - Mitsuhime married Tokugawa Munekatsu of Takasu Domain and then the Owari Domain, by Onoue

Preceded by Tokugawa Tsunanari	Daimyō of Owari; 1699–1713	Succeeded by Tokugawa Gorōta
