= Tokugawa Garden =

Japanese Garden

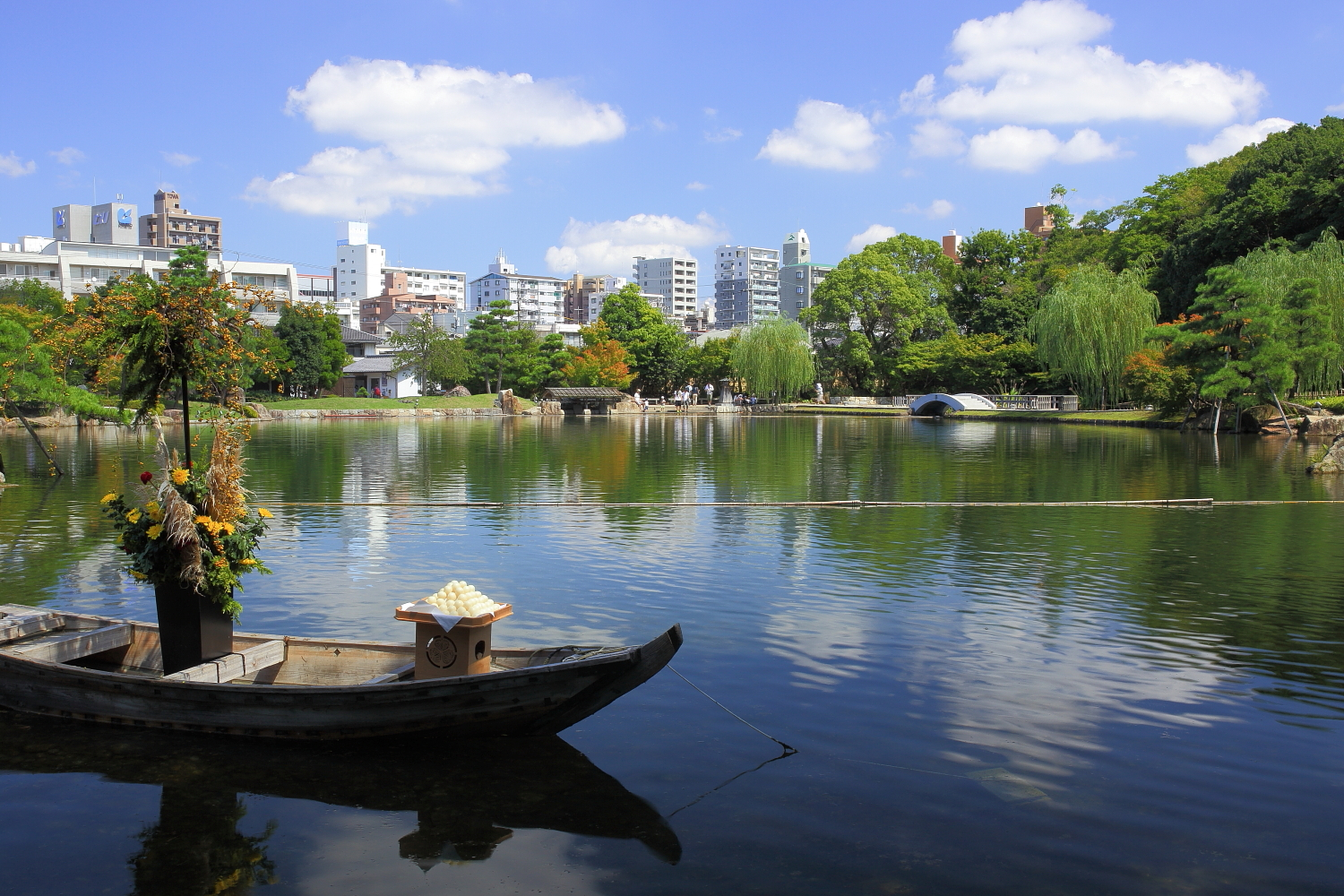
- Tokugawa Garden with Ryusenko (Ryusen Lake)

- Location within Japan
- Type: Japanese garden
- Coordinates: 35°11′04″N 136°55′57″E

The Tokugawa Garden (徳川園 Tokugawa-en) is a Japanese garden in the city of Nagoya, central Japan. It is located next to the Tokugawa Art Museum.

== History ==
In the early Edo period (1603-1867), Tokugawa Mitsutomo (1625-1700), the second lord of the Owari branch of the Tokugawa clan, established a vast residence called the Ōzone Shimoyashiki. After his death, the property was passed on to the families of his three retainers Naruse, Ishiko, and Watanabe, until the Meiji Restoration of 1867, when ownership was returned to the Owari Tokugawa.

In 1931, Tokugawa Yoshichika (1886-1976), the 19th head of the Tokugawa family, decided that "the time had come to present the property to the community", and donated the land of 23,000 m2 and buildings to the City of Nagoya. Included in the donation were family treasures and the establishment of the Owari Tokugawa Reimeikai Foundation. The City opened the garden in 1932, and the foundation opened the art museum in 1935. The garden however was destroyed during World War II, leaving only the main gate intact.

To celebrate the 50th anniversary of the art museum in 1985, nationwide fundraising led by local economic organisations made possible extensive renovations and expansion of the museum. In 2004, aiming to unite many historical inheritances found in the region, the garden, a sanctuary of modern samurai culture representing Japan was built, along with a stroll-style pond to complete its atmosphere.

To the south of the garden, the Hōsa Library houses historical materials and documents connected with the Owari Tokugawa family.

Access by public transport is by Morishita Station by the Seto line or Ōzone Station by the Meijo Line of the Nagoya Municipal Subway.

== Layout ==
Access to the complex is through the main gate, called Kuro-mon (Black Gate). The gate, which survived the destruction of World War II, is made out of wood and has a gable roof.

The garden has a large pond in the middle. Surrounding it are waterfalls, promenades, various tea houses, and bridges. Seasonal blooms of the flowers include Japanese apricot (ume), peony (botan), iris (hanashobu), and maple (momiji). Flowers include winter camellia, camellia, Japanese witch-hazel, Shan Zhu Zu, Japanese apricot, apricot, Japanese pachysandra, Lily of the Valley bush, peach trees, azalea, fringed iris, rhododendron, calanthe, Satsuki azalea, tea of heaven, iris, gardenia, lilyturf, cluster amaryllis, Japanese silver leaf, Reineckea, and sasanqua.

== Gallery ==
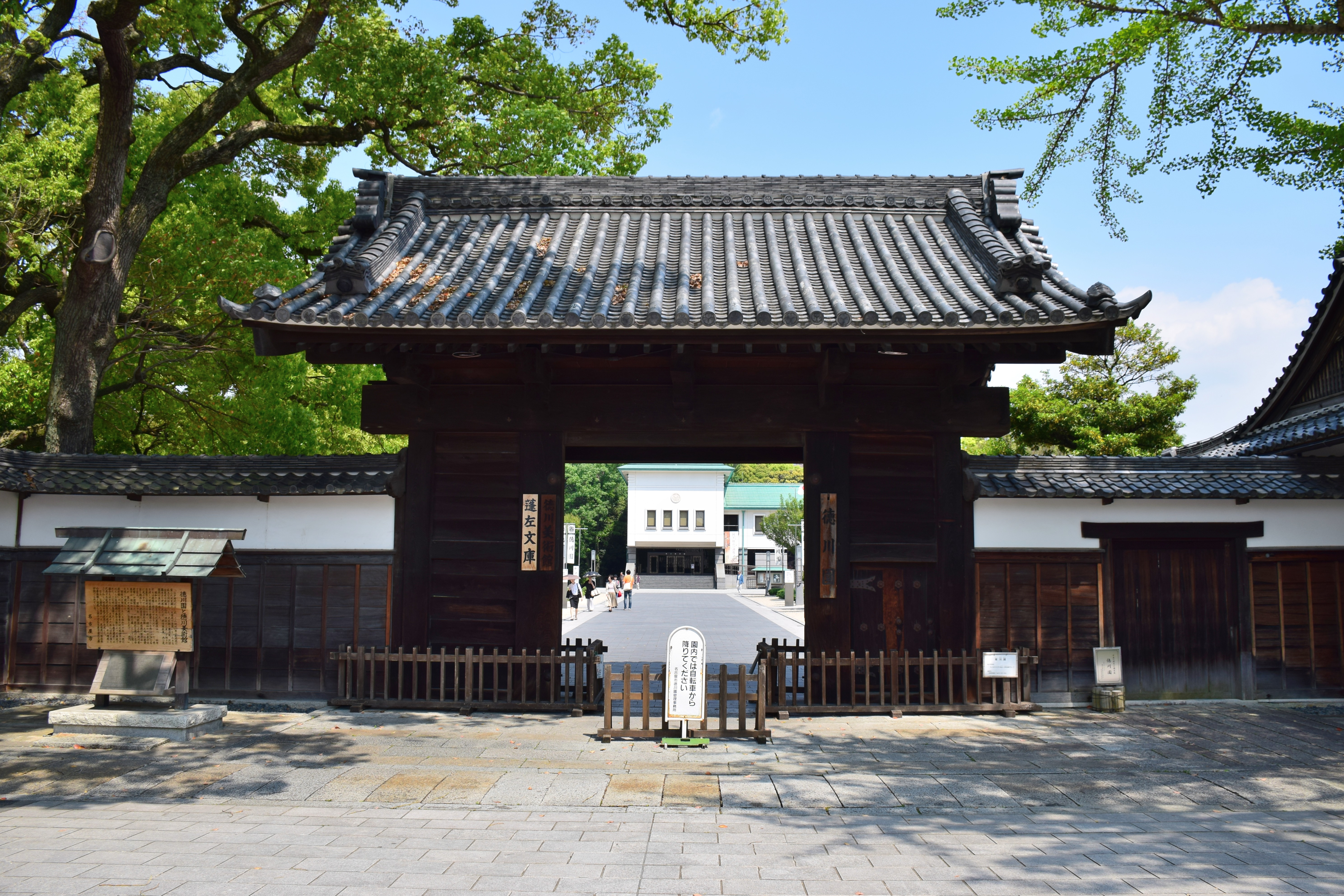
The main Black Gate (Kuro-mon) that leads into the Ōzone Shimoyashiki where the garden is located

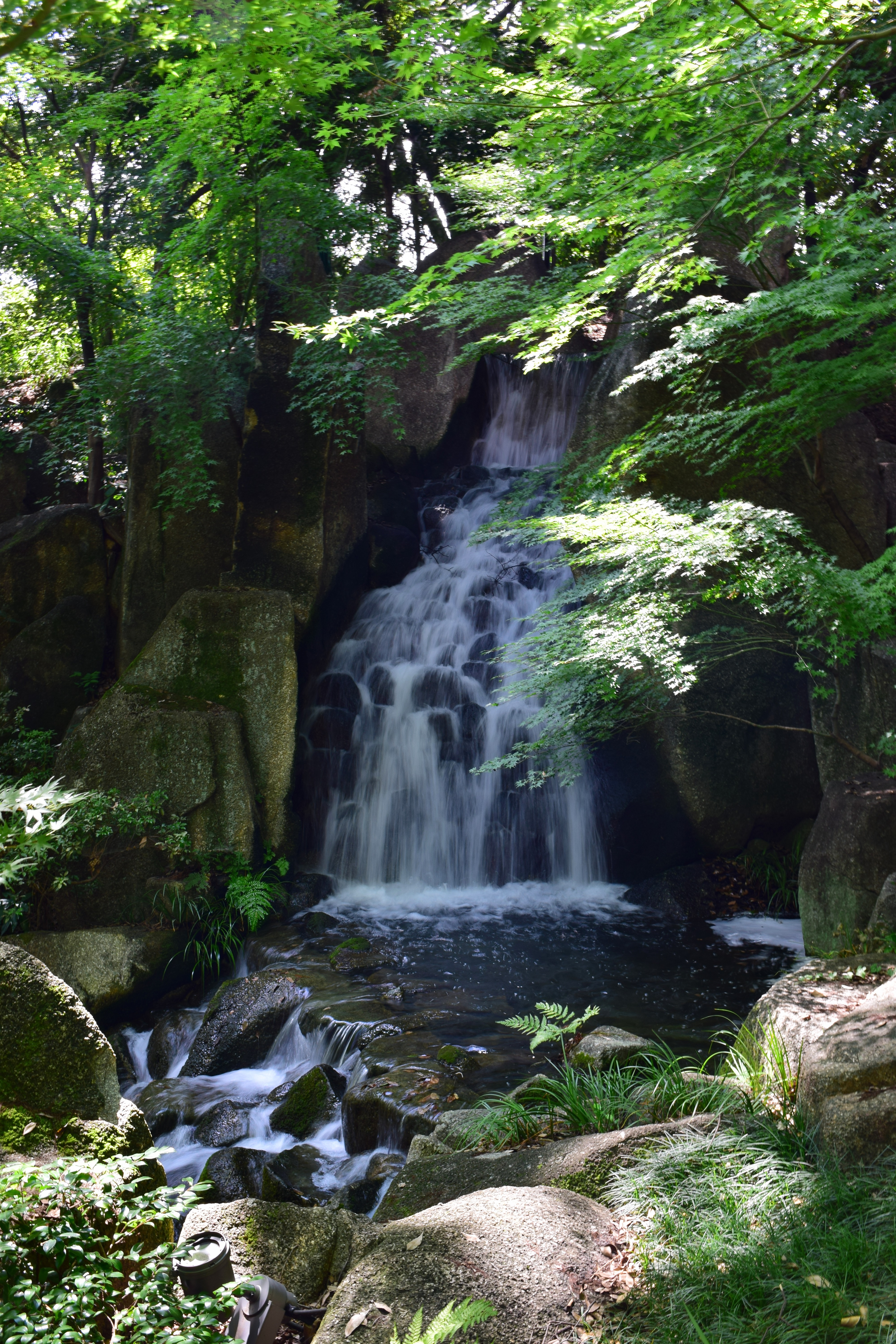
Ōzone-no-taki (Ōzone Waterfall)

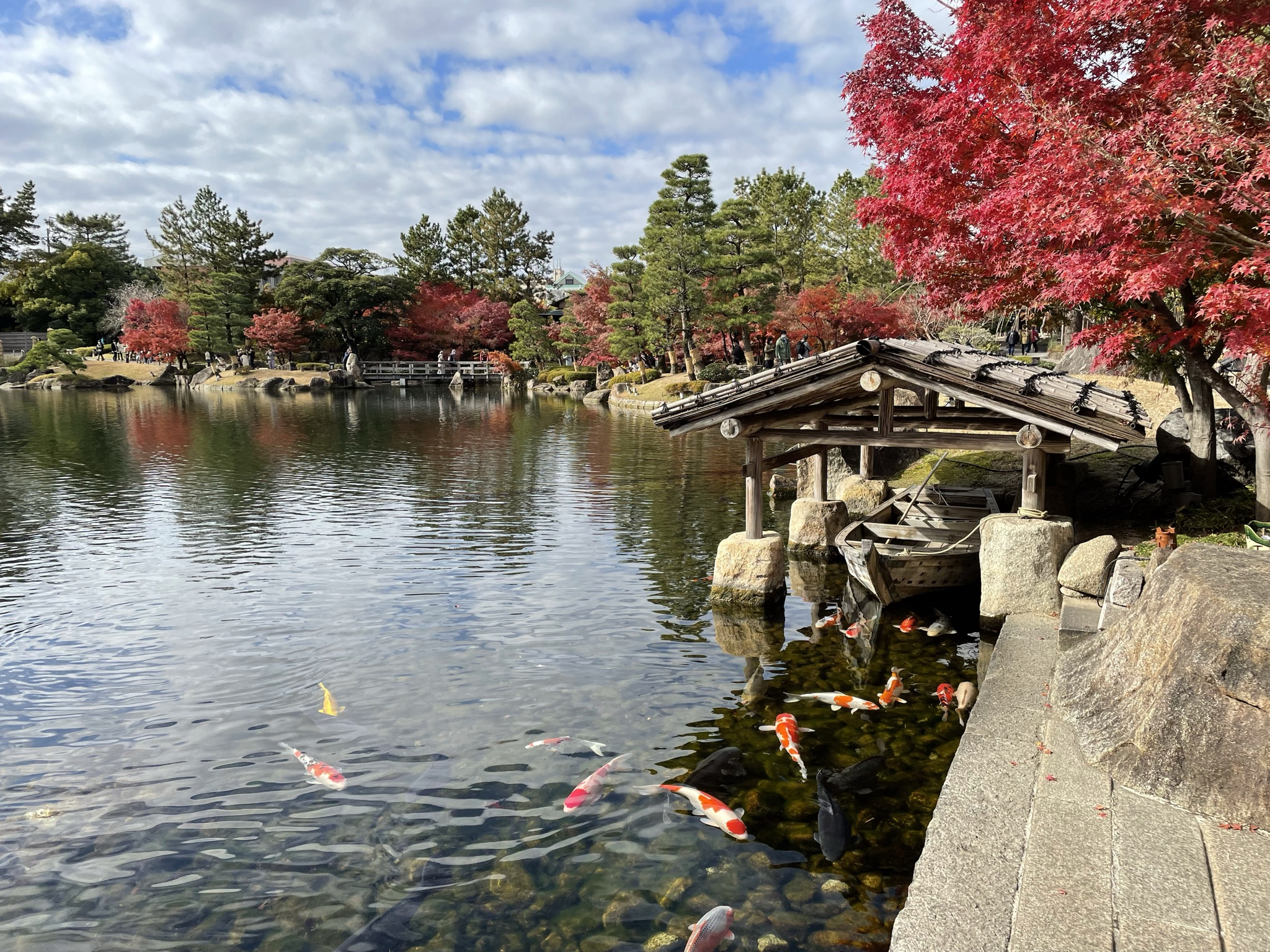
Ryusen Lake

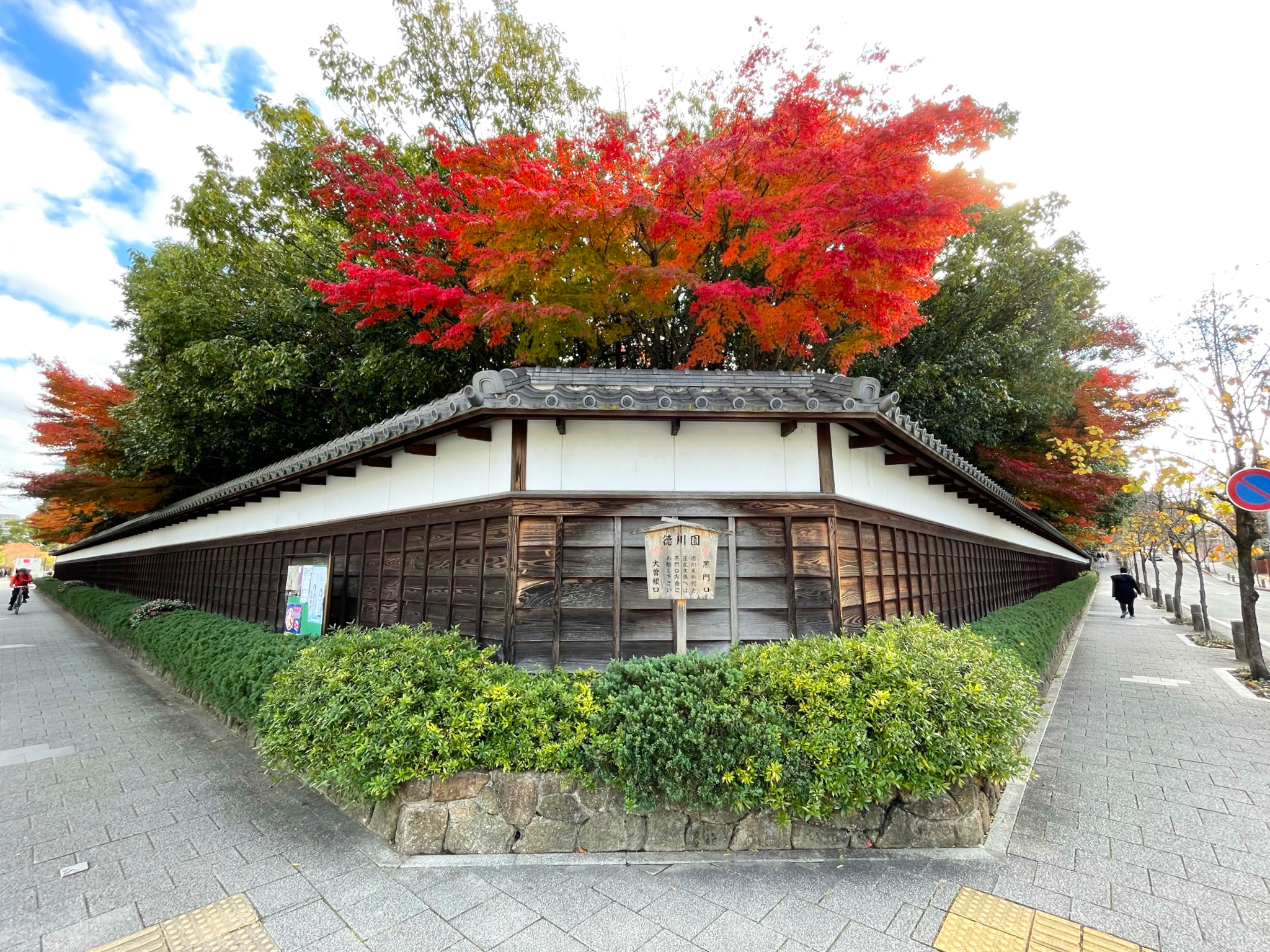
Walls

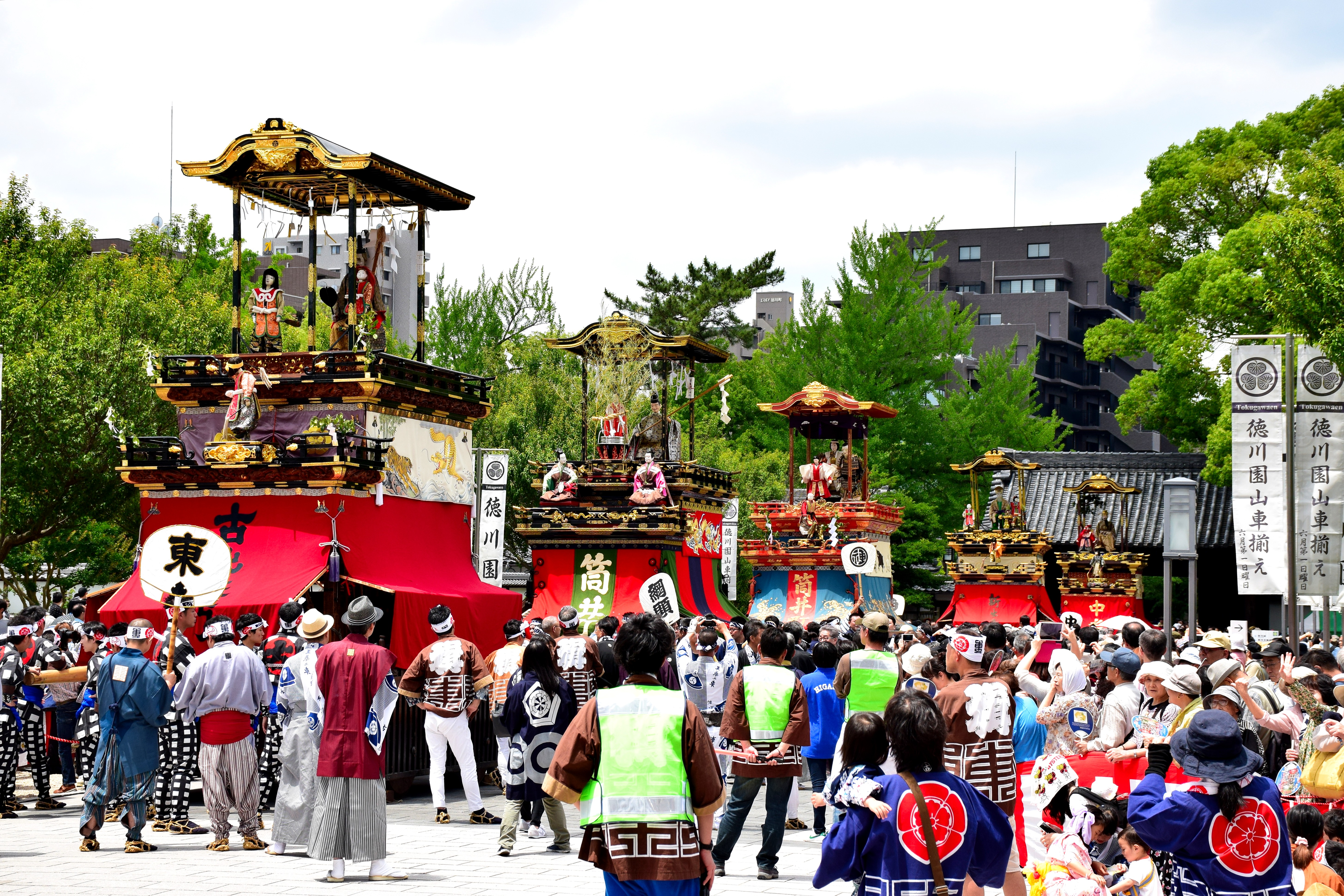
Float Festival in Tokugawa Garden
