= Hōsa Library =

Library in Nagoya, Japan

Coordinates: 35°11′03.78″N 136°55′56.17″E

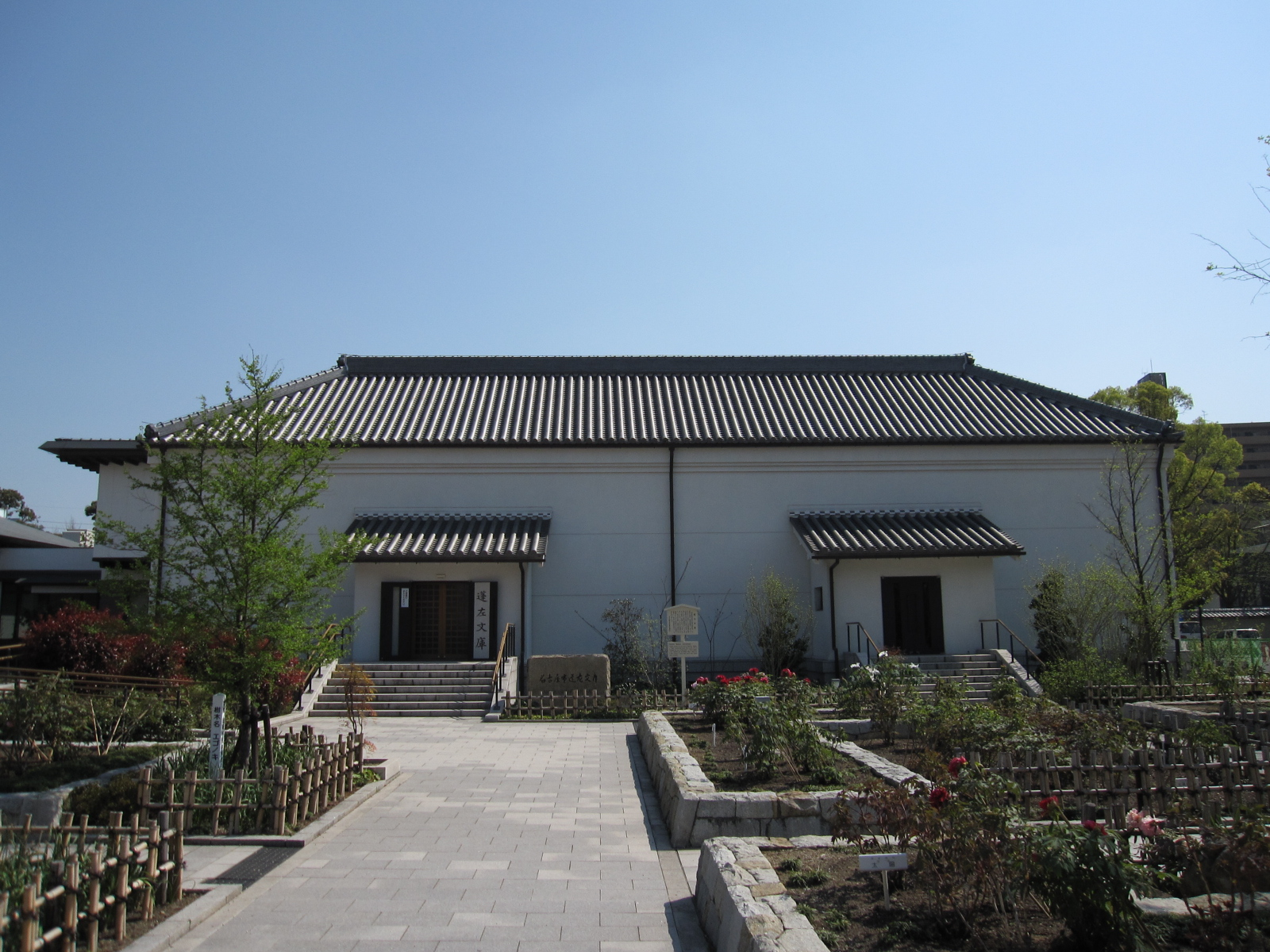
Hōsa Library

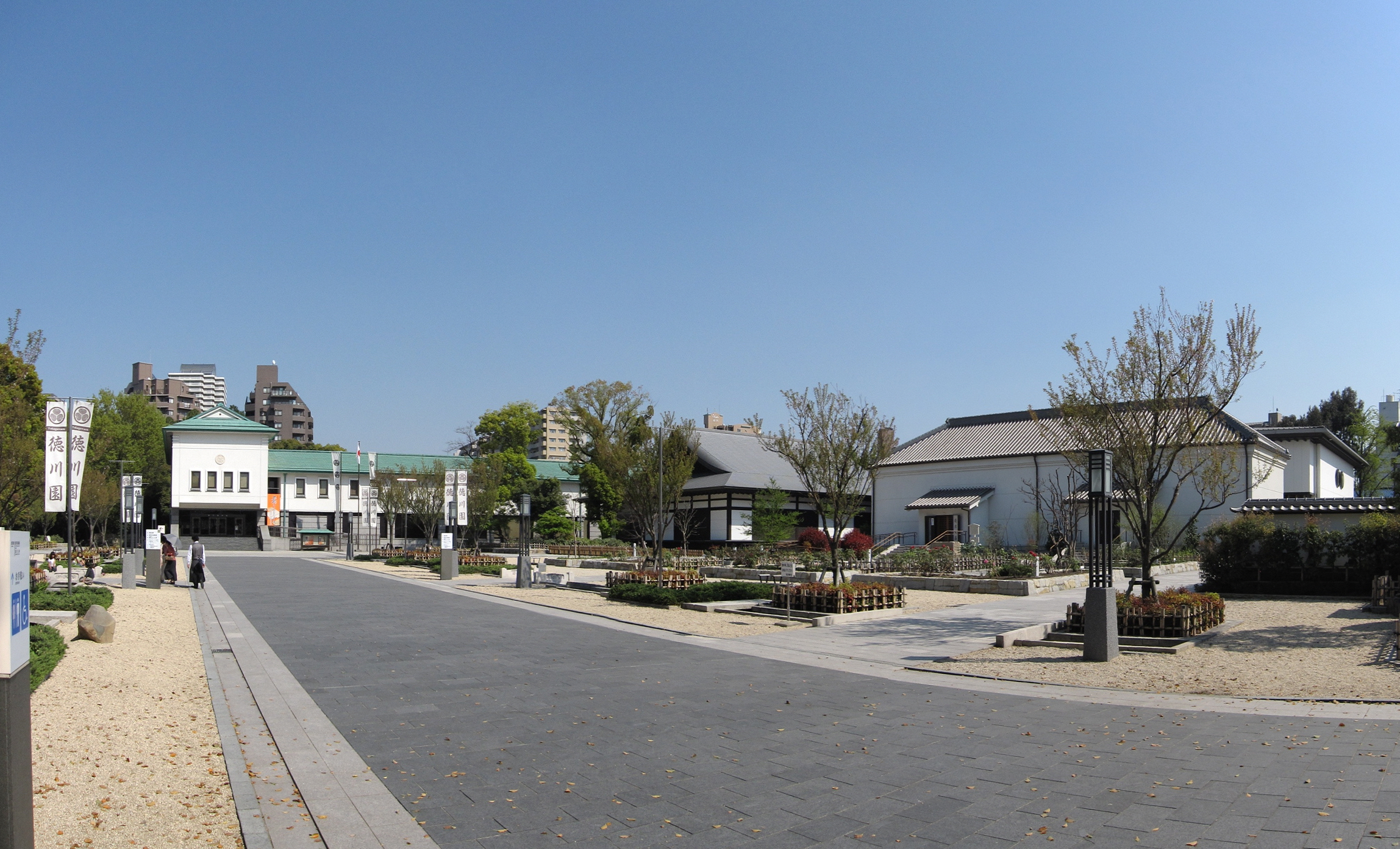
The buildings of the Hōsa Library (right) on the compound of the Ōzone Shimoyashiki in Nagoya

The Hōsa Library (蓬左文庫) is a library located on the compound of the Ōzone Shimoyashiki in Nagoya, central Japan.

== History ==
Tokugawa Yoshinao, the first lord of the Owari Domain, established it as an official archive. It was transferred from the Tokugawa family to Nagoya City in 1950. Presently the library has about 110,000 items including classic literature. In 1978 it became a branch of the Nagoya City Museum.

The library cooperates closely with the neighbouring Tokugawa Art Museum and the Tokugawa Garden.
