= Tokugawa Art Museum =

Museum in Nagoya, Aichi, Japan

Coordinates: 35.183692°N 136.933189°E

- 徳川美術館
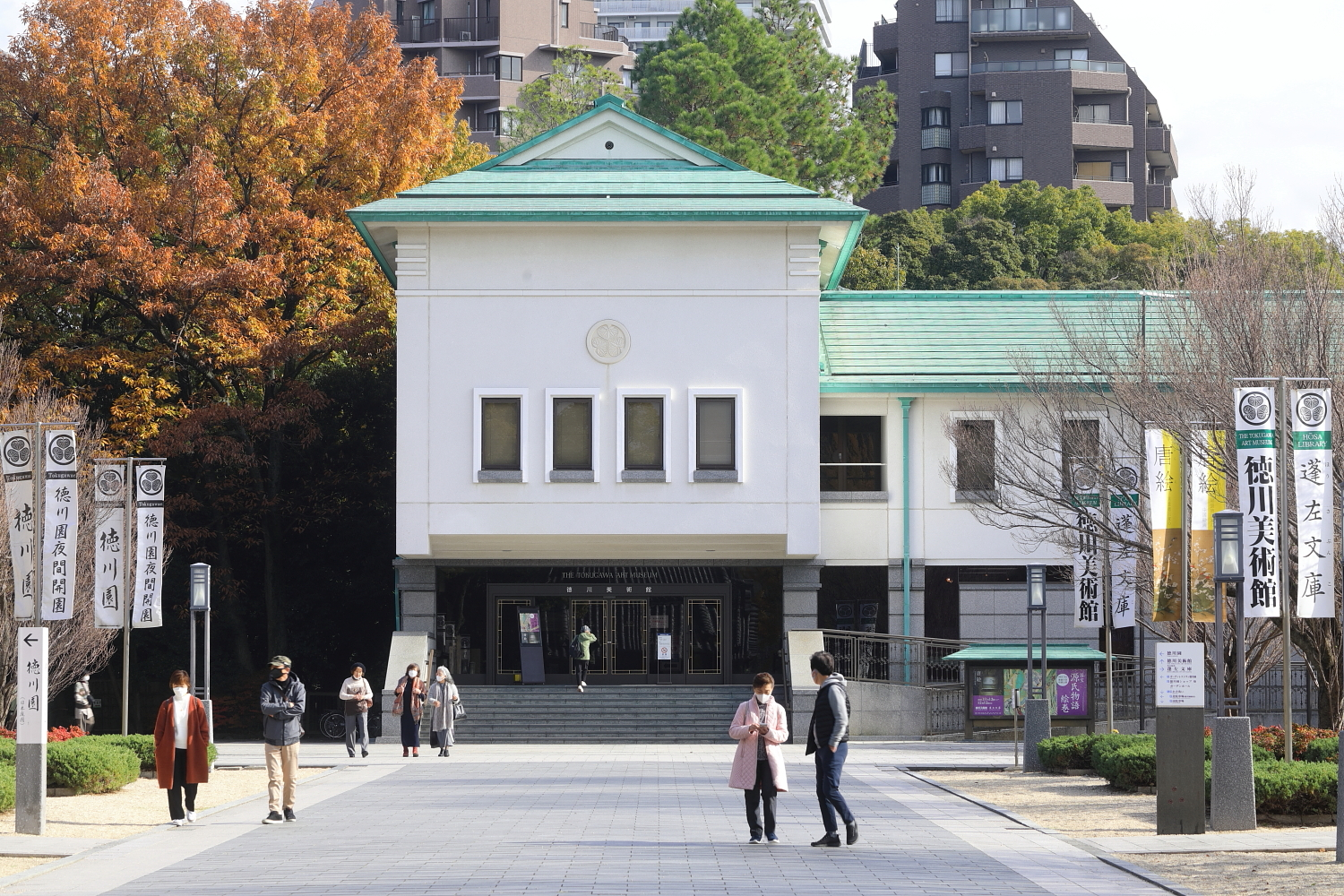
- Entrance
- Established: 10 November 1935; 90 years ago
- Location: Nagoya City, Japan
- Type: Art museum
- Key holdings: National Treasures: Religious artwork, Tale of Genji, Japanese Swords (nobility)
- Collections: Ancestral artefacts from the house of Owari Tokugawa
- Founder: House of Owari Tokugawa
- Director: Yoshitaka Tokugawa (2016)
- Curator: Tokugawa Reimeikai Foundation
- Architect: Yoshio Yoshimoto
- Public transit access: Ozone Station (10–15 minute walk)
- Website: www.tokugawa-art-museum.jp

The Tokugawa Art Museum (徳川美術館, Tokugawa Bijutsukan) is a private art museum, located on the former Ōzone Shimoyashiki compound in Nagoya, central Japan. Its collection contains more than 12,000 items, including swords, armor, Noh costumes and masks, lacquer furniture, Chinese and Japanese ceramics, calligraphy, and paintings from the Chinese Song and Yuan dynasties (960–1368).

== History ==
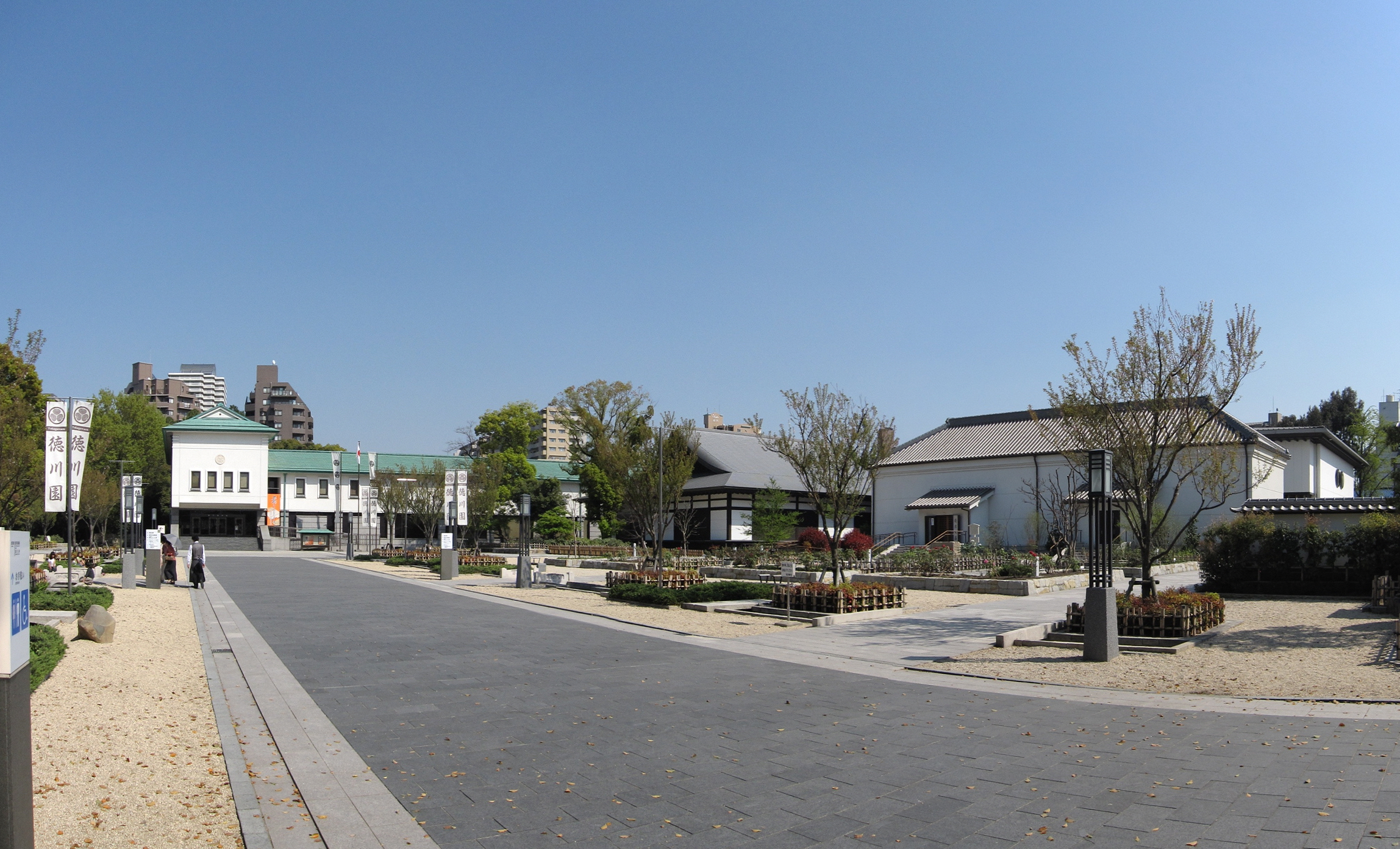
Panoramic view of the Ōzone Shimoyashiki compound, with the museum on the left

Unlike many private museums in Japan, which are based on collections assembled in the modern era by corporations or entrepreneurs, the Tokugawa Art Museum houses the hereditary collection of the Owari branch of the Tokugawa clan, which ruled the Owari Domain in what is now Aichi Prefecture. The museum is operated by the Tokugawa Reimeikai Foundation, which was founded in 1931 by Yoshichika Tokugawa (1886–1976), 19th head of the Owari clan, in order to preserve the clan's priceless collection of art objects, furnishings, and heirlooms.

=== Building architecture ===
The architectural plan for the museum main building and southern archives were drawn up by Yoshio Yoshimoto, and construction was completed in 1935. The architecture is in the Imperial Crown style, in which the roof and exterior follow a classic Japanese design over a Western style building.

== Collection ==
The permanent exhibition also shows historical reproduction of the Nagoya Castle Ninomaru palace living quarters of the Owari Tokugawa daimyō, allowing visitors to view the objects as they were actually used in settings such as a Japanese tea-house or the Noh stage of the palace. The museum also mounts temporary exhibitions in a building that has been declared a national cultural property.

The most important and valuable treasures are the Genji Monogatari Emaki, three Heian period illustrated handscrolls of The Tale of Genji, dating to the 1130s. Along with one other scroll from the same set, now preserved at the Gotoh Museum, they are the earliest extant depictions of the epic tale and are National Treasures of Japan. The scrolls are so fragile that they are not permanently displayed to the public. Since at least 2001, they have been displayed in the Tokugawa Museum for one week in November.

Other registered important art objects include:

- Beni Annan Soukamon Chawan tea bowl (紅安南草花文茶碗), flowering-plant design, blue and white with red and green enamels. Vietnam, 16th C.
- Tea bowl named Mishima-oke (三島桶), Mishima ware type, carved and inlaid decoration, Buncheong ware from Korea, Joseon dynasty, 15-16th century. It was owned by Sen no Rikyu and Doan, later Tokugawa Ieyasu and then the 1st Owari lord Tokugawa Yoshinao Classified a O-Meibutsu
- Celadon censer named Chidori (千鳥)

The Hōsa Library is located next to the museum and houses 110,000 items, including classic literature belonging to the Owari branch. Located next to the museum is the Tokugawa Garden.

=== Sample exhibits ===
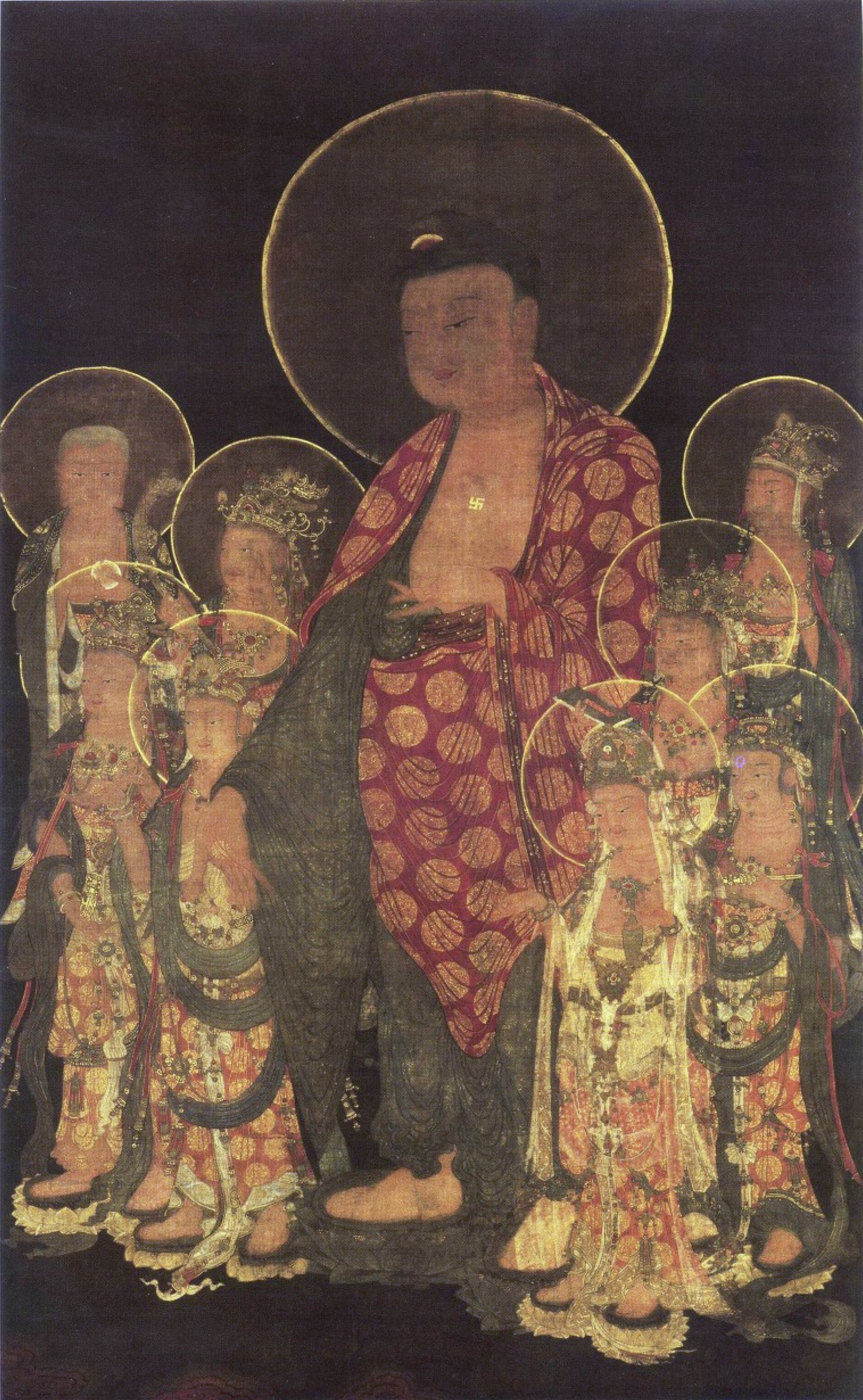
Amitabha with Eight Great Bodhisattvas (14th century)

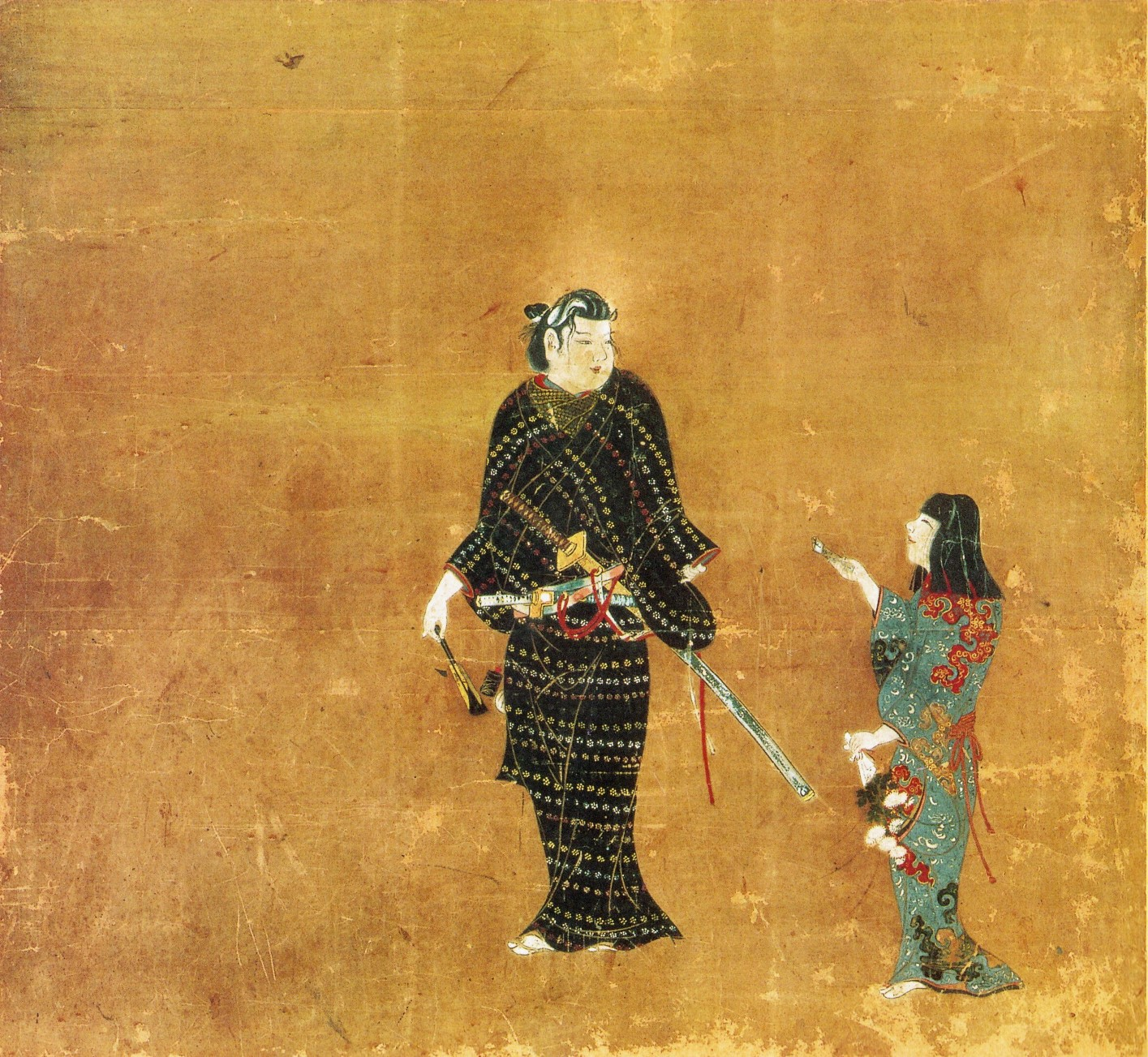
Honda Heihachiro with Senhime (17th century) left panel

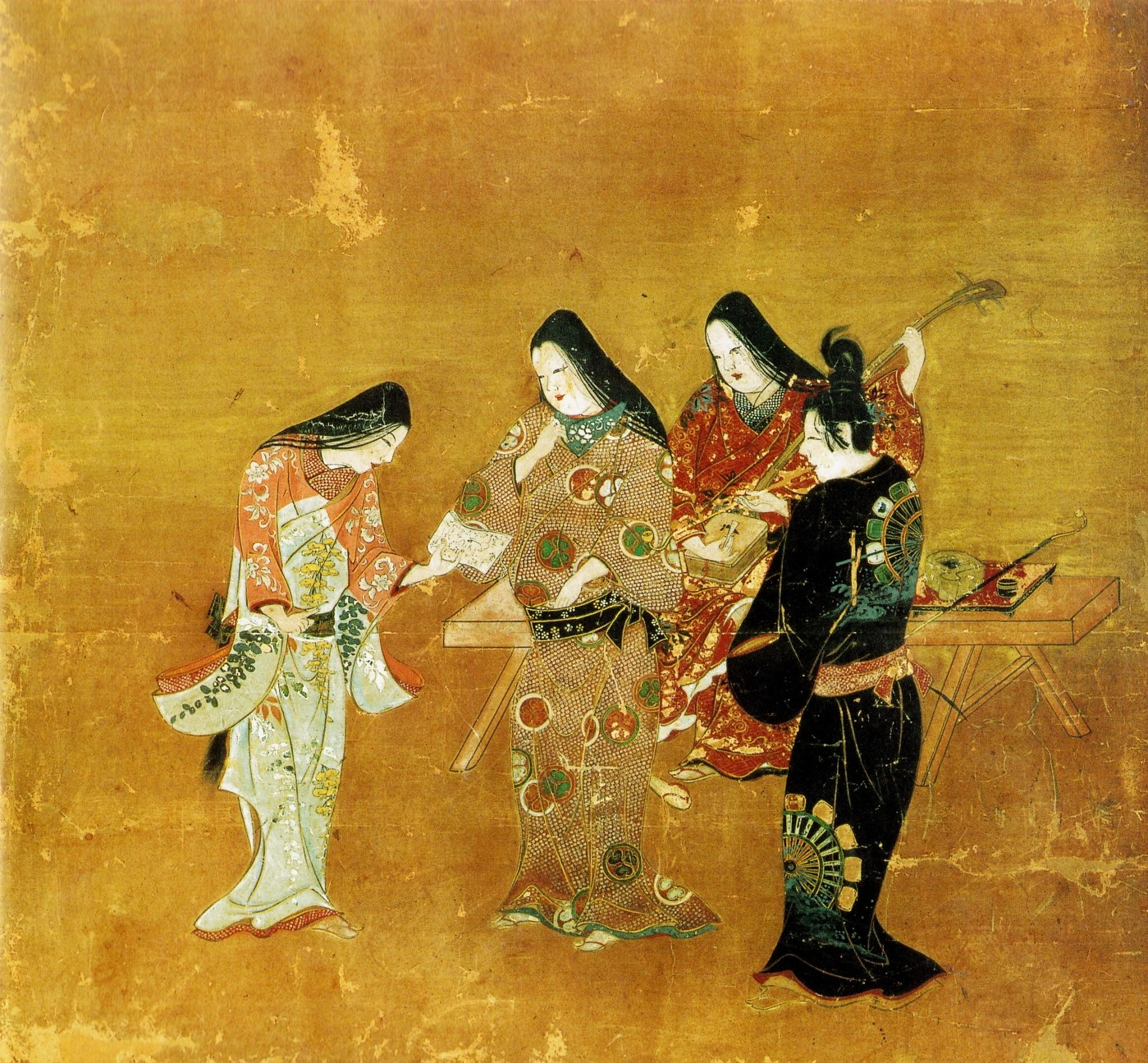
Honda Heihachiro with Senhime (17th century) right panel

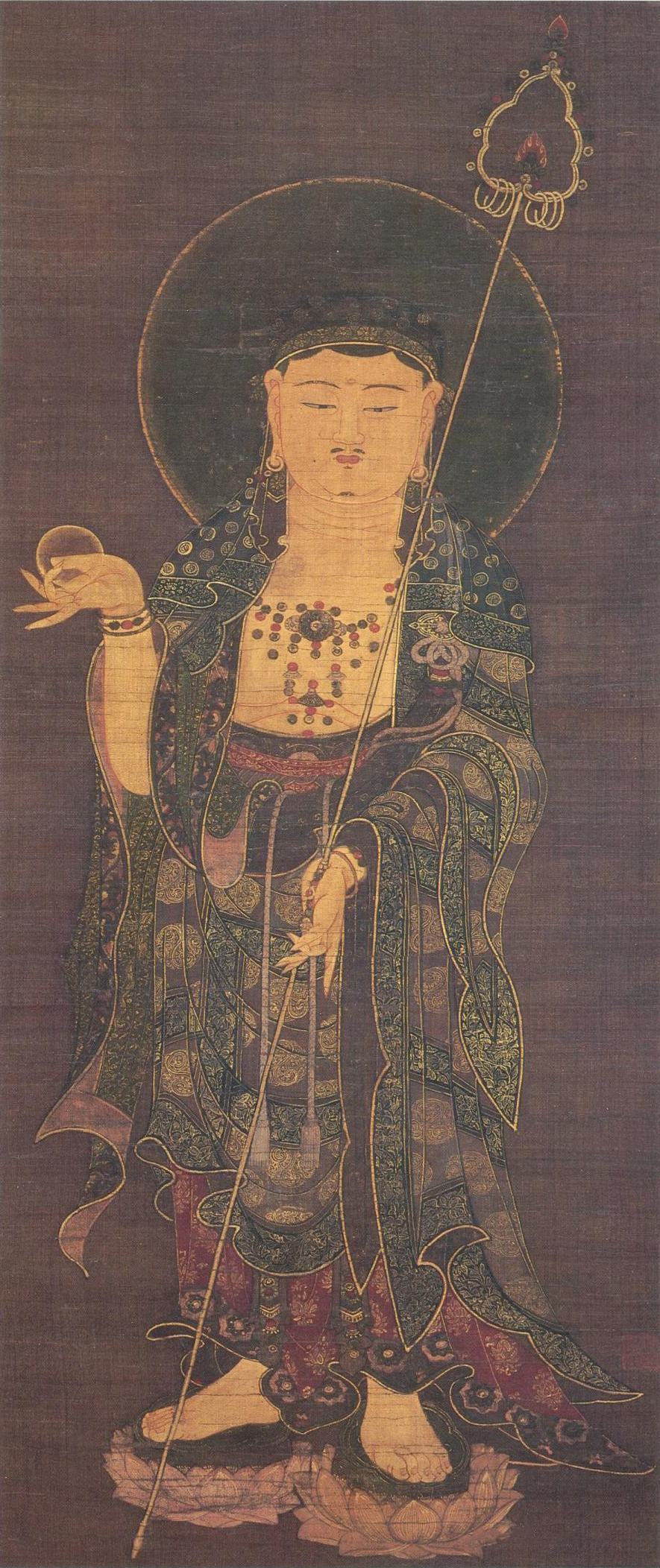
Bodhisattva (14th century)

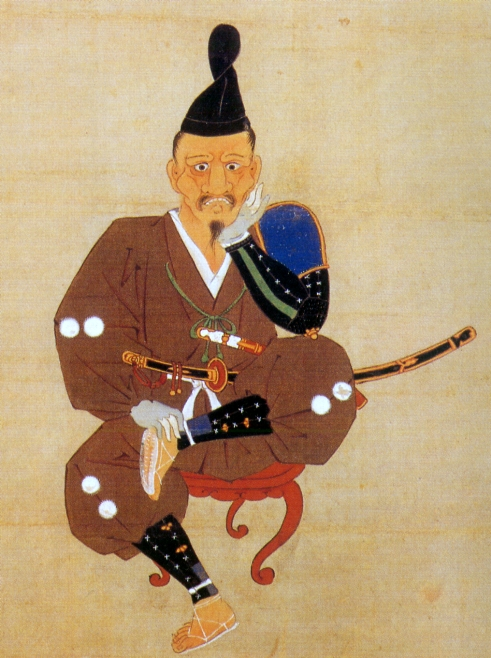
Portrait of Tokugawa Ieyasu, for the occasion of the Battle of Mikatagahara

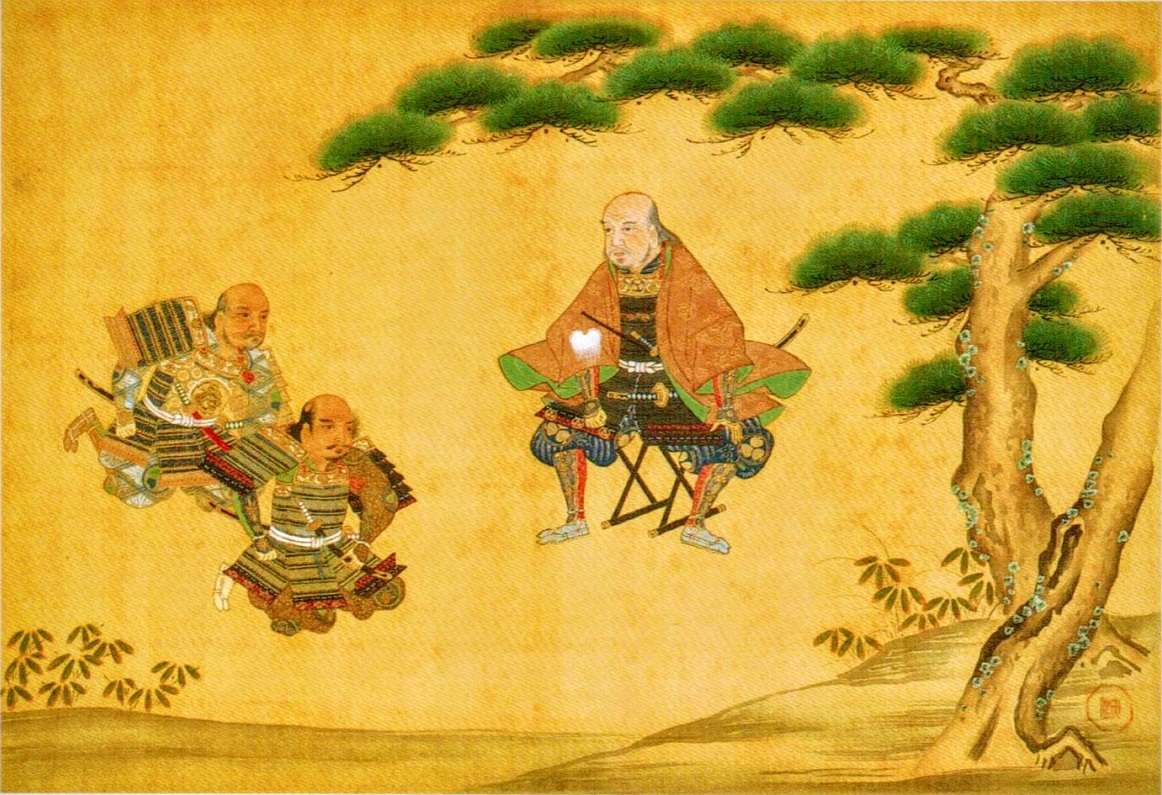
Portrait of Tokugawa Ieyasu, at the Battle of Komaki and Nagakute (17th century)

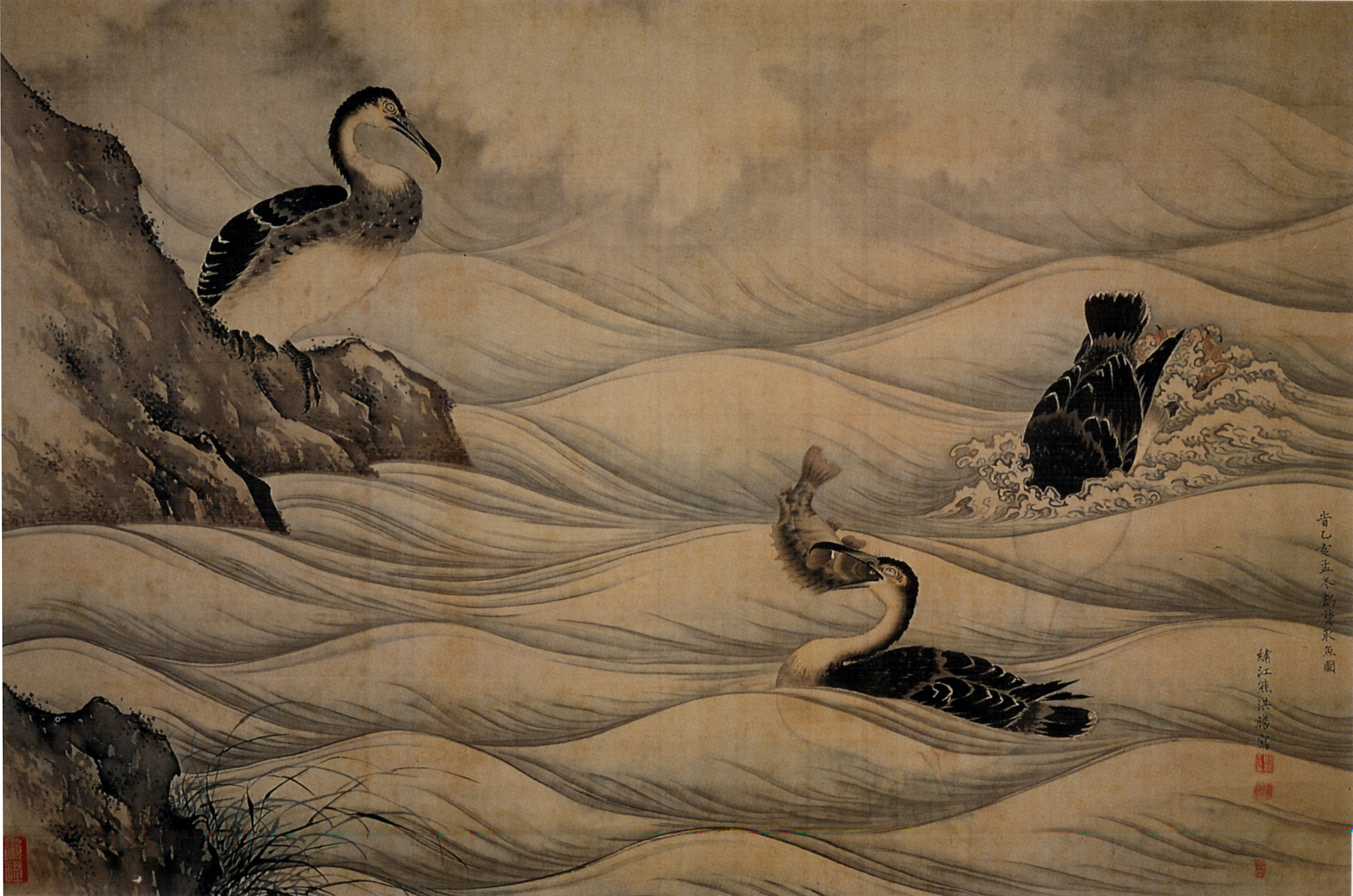
Kamashiro Yuhi's Cormorants catching fish, a hanging scroll on silk. (1755)

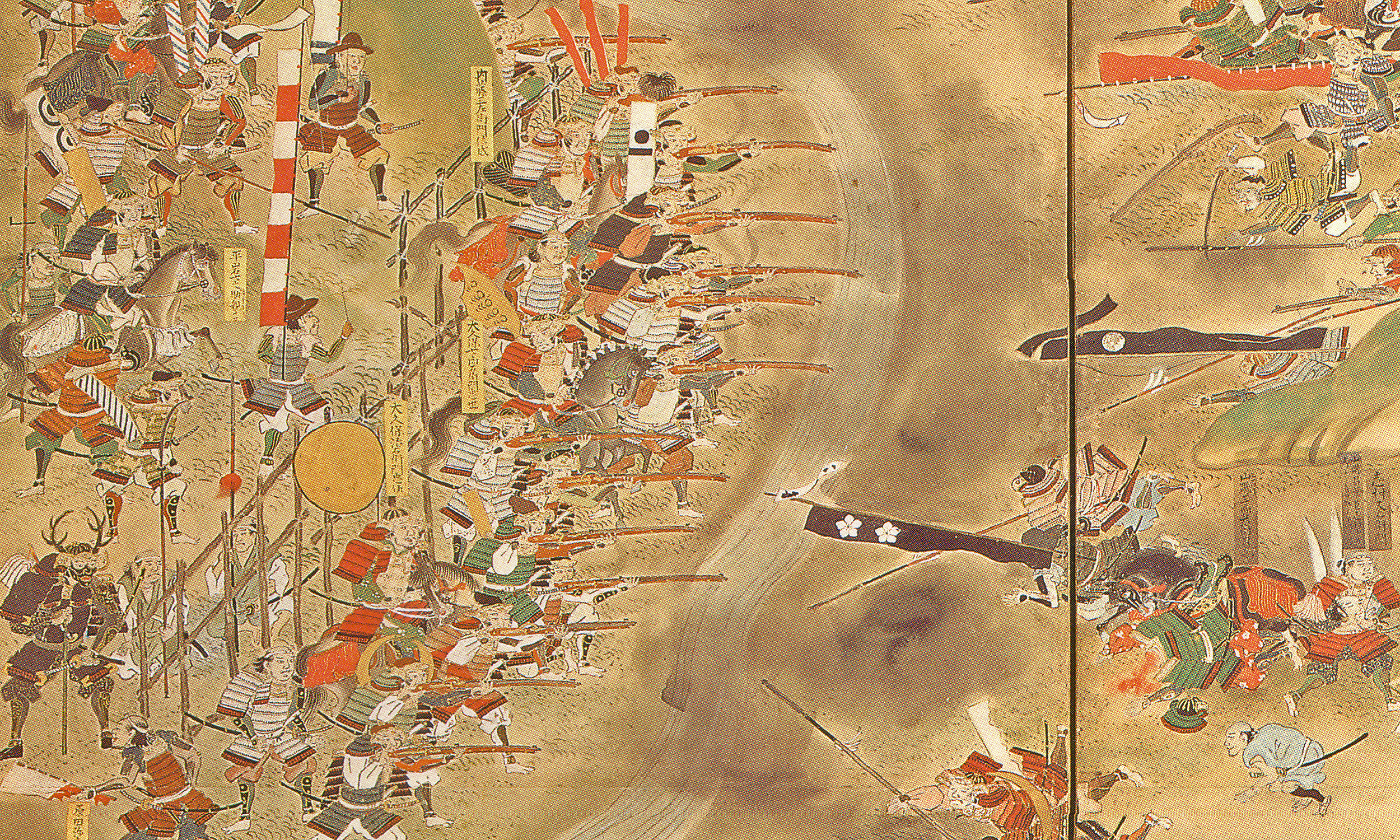
Battle of Nagashino featuring riflemen. (18th century)

=== National treasure designated illustrations from the handscroll of the Tale of Genji 12th Century ===
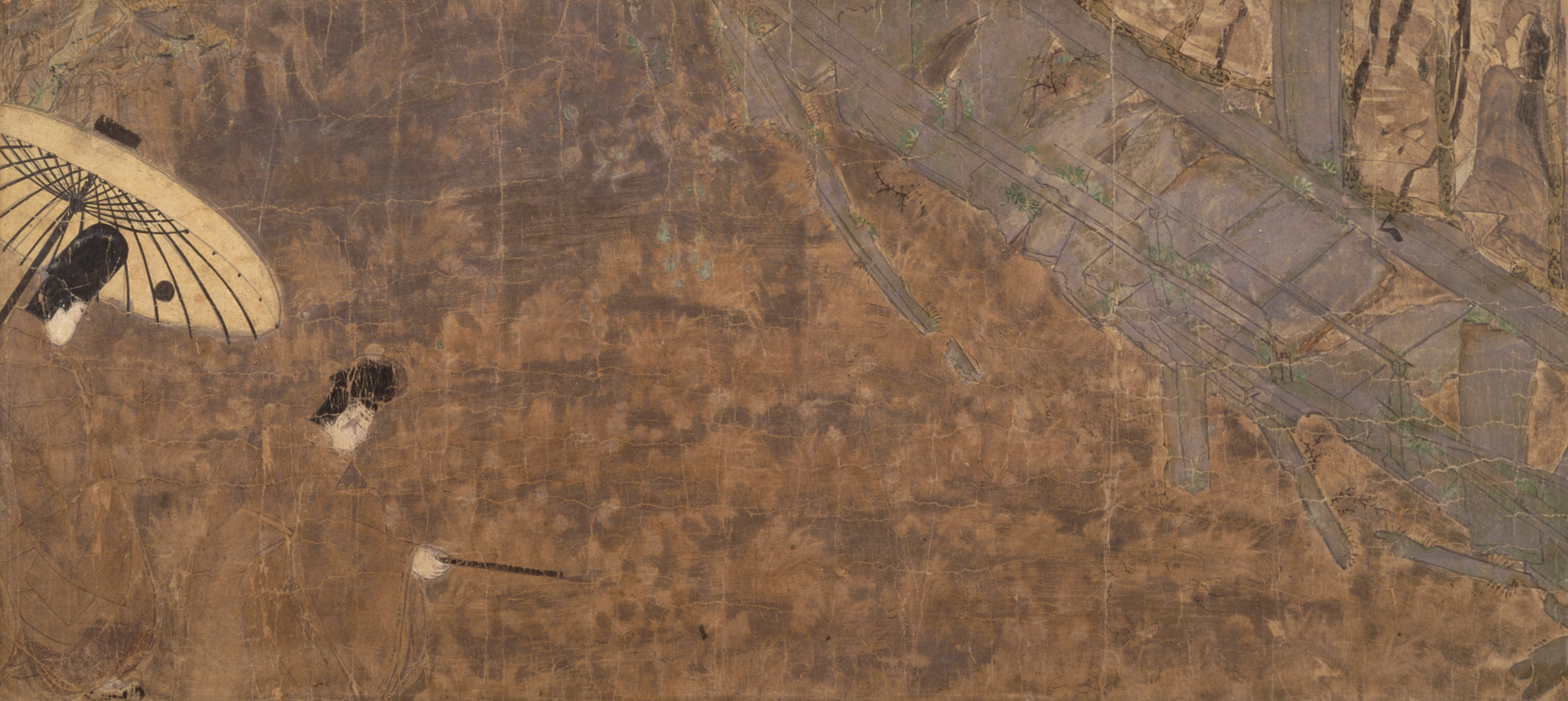
Chapter "Yomogui" (Waste of Weeds)

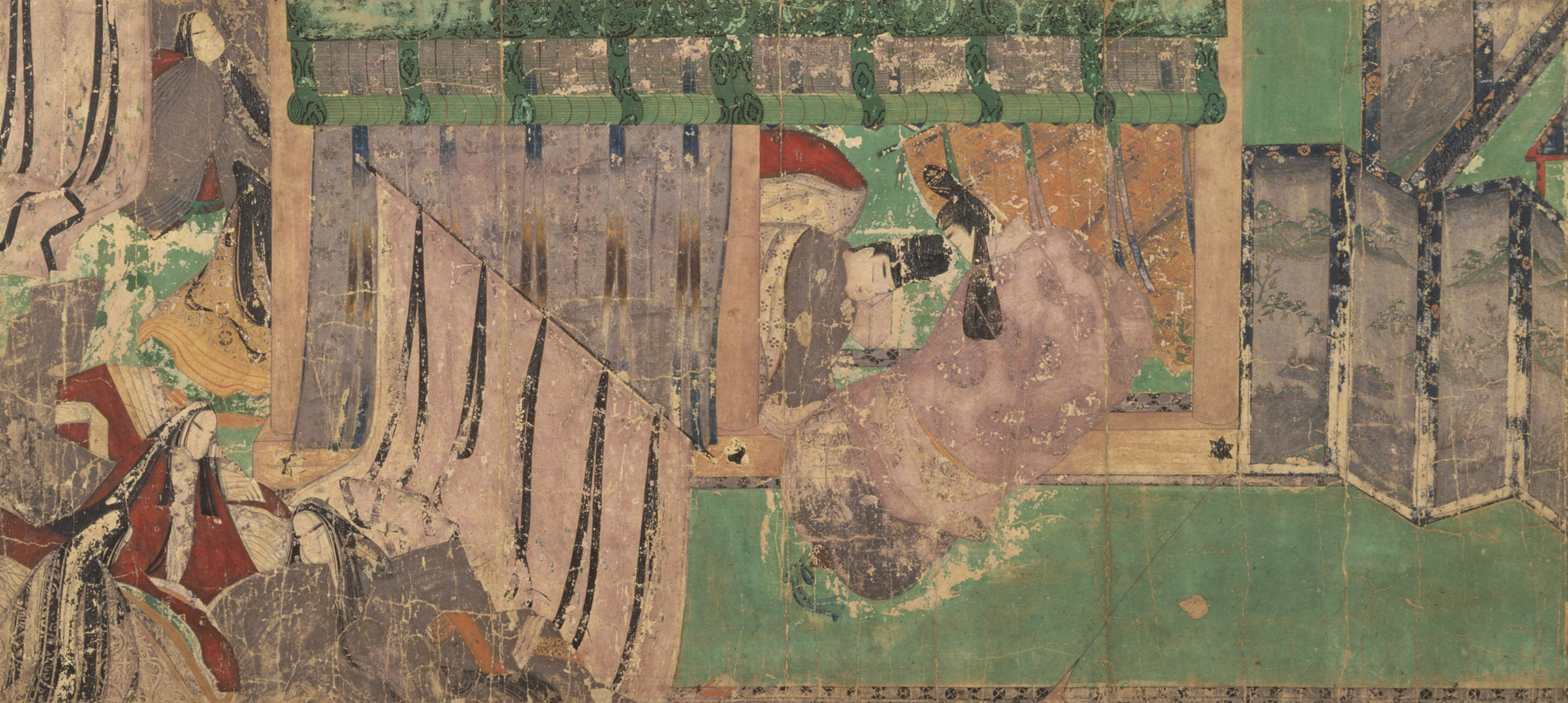
Chapter "Kashiwagi"

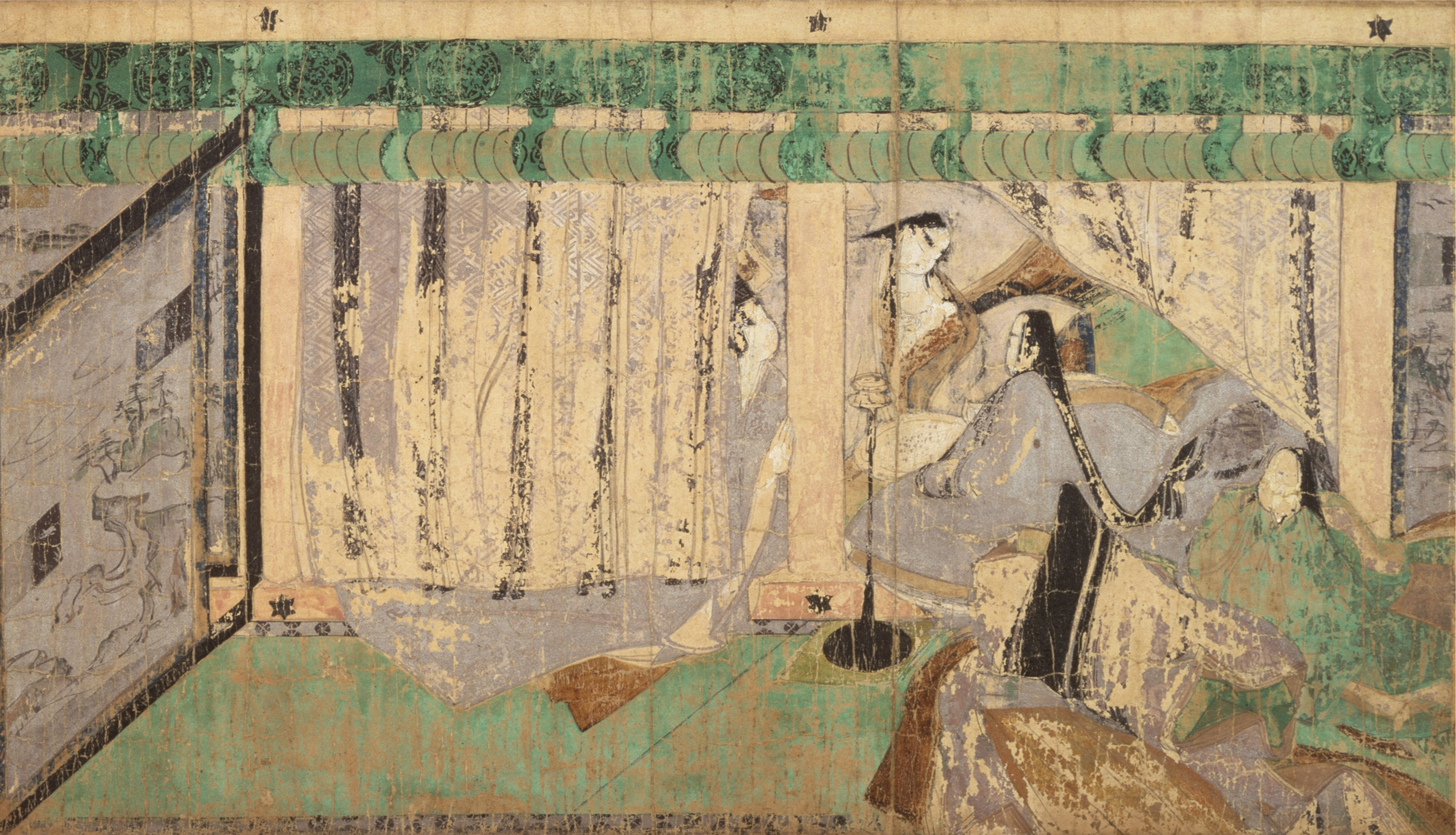
Chapter "Yokobue" (Flute)

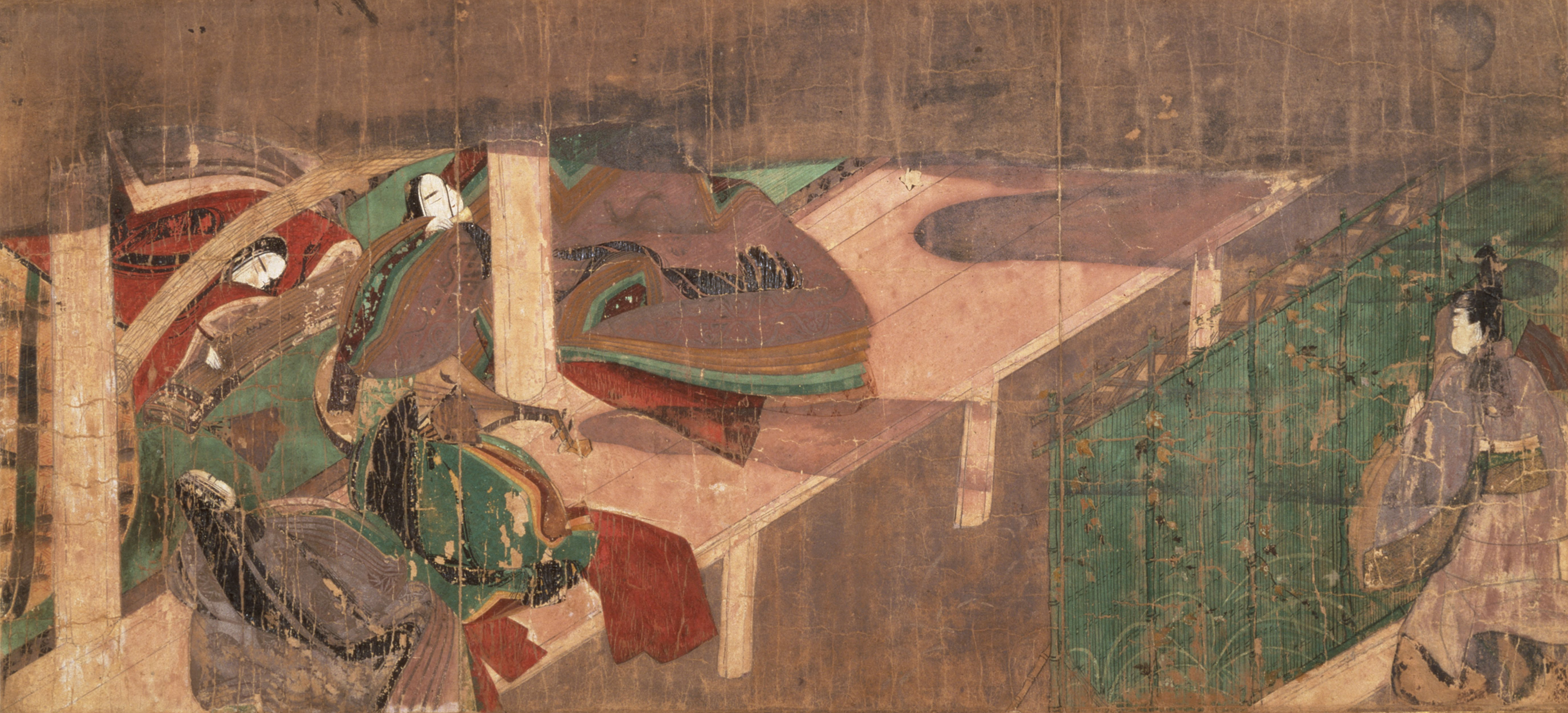
Chapter "Hashihime" (Bridge Princess)

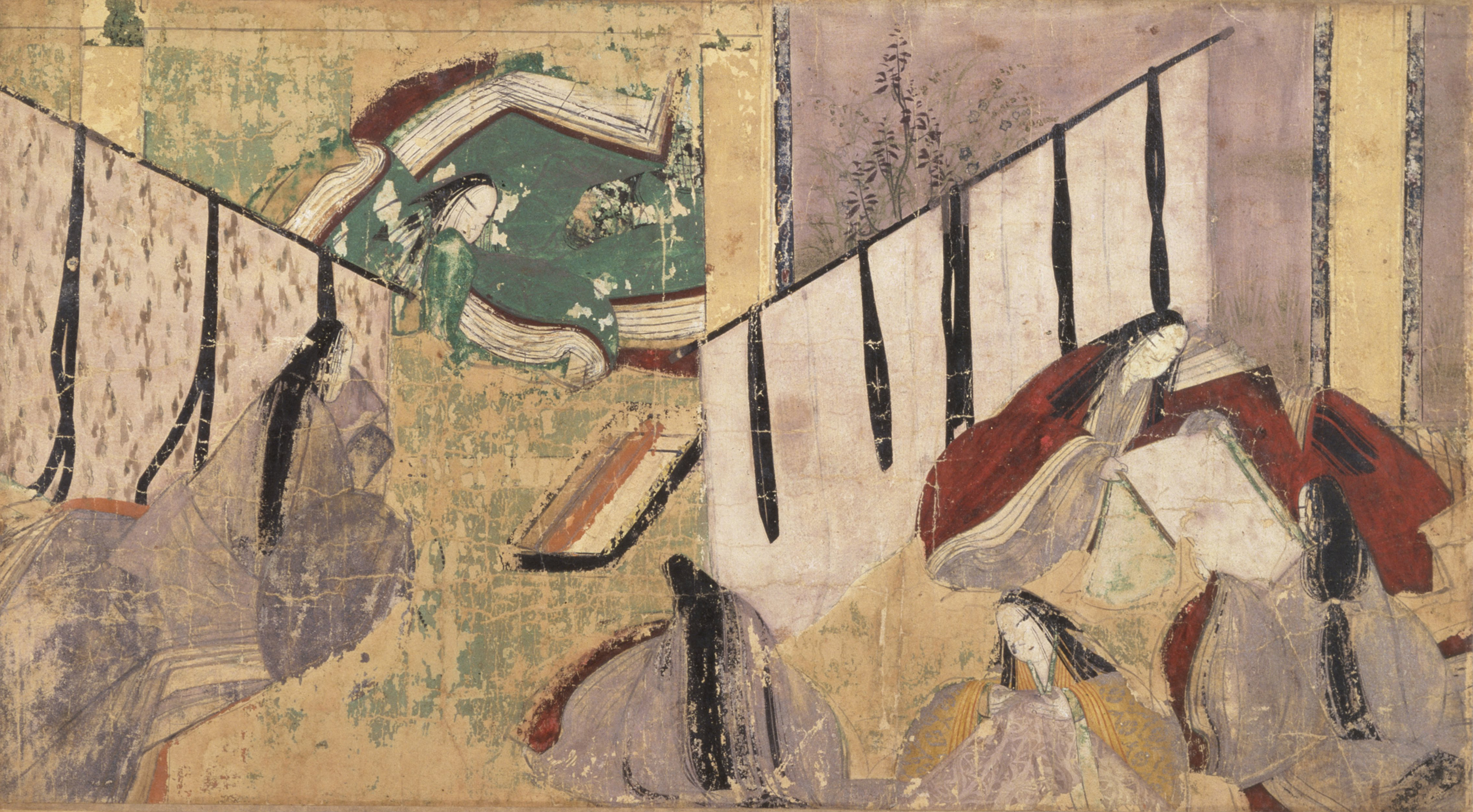
Chapter "Sawarabi" (Sprout)

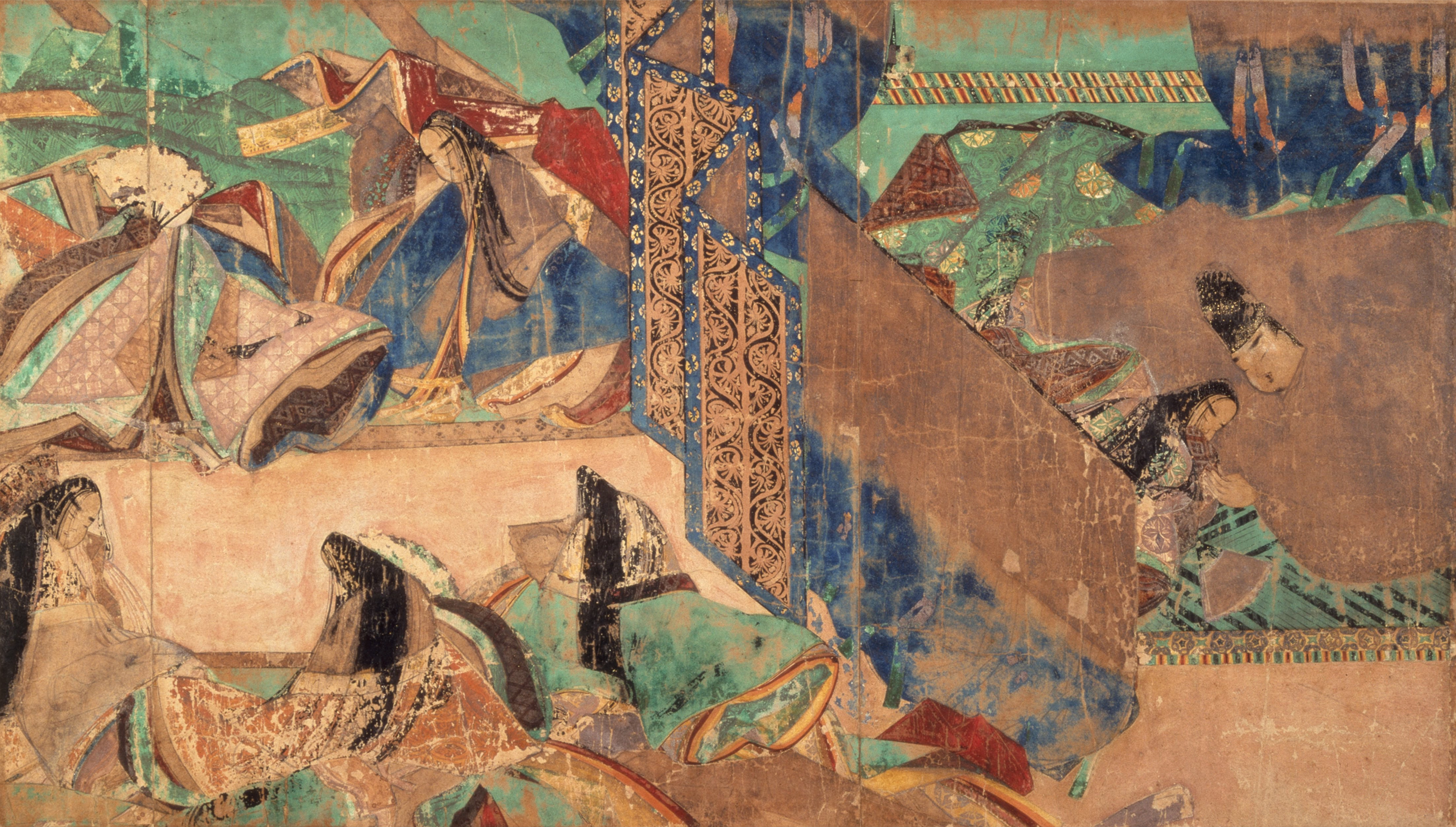
Chapter "Yadorigi" (Mistletoe)

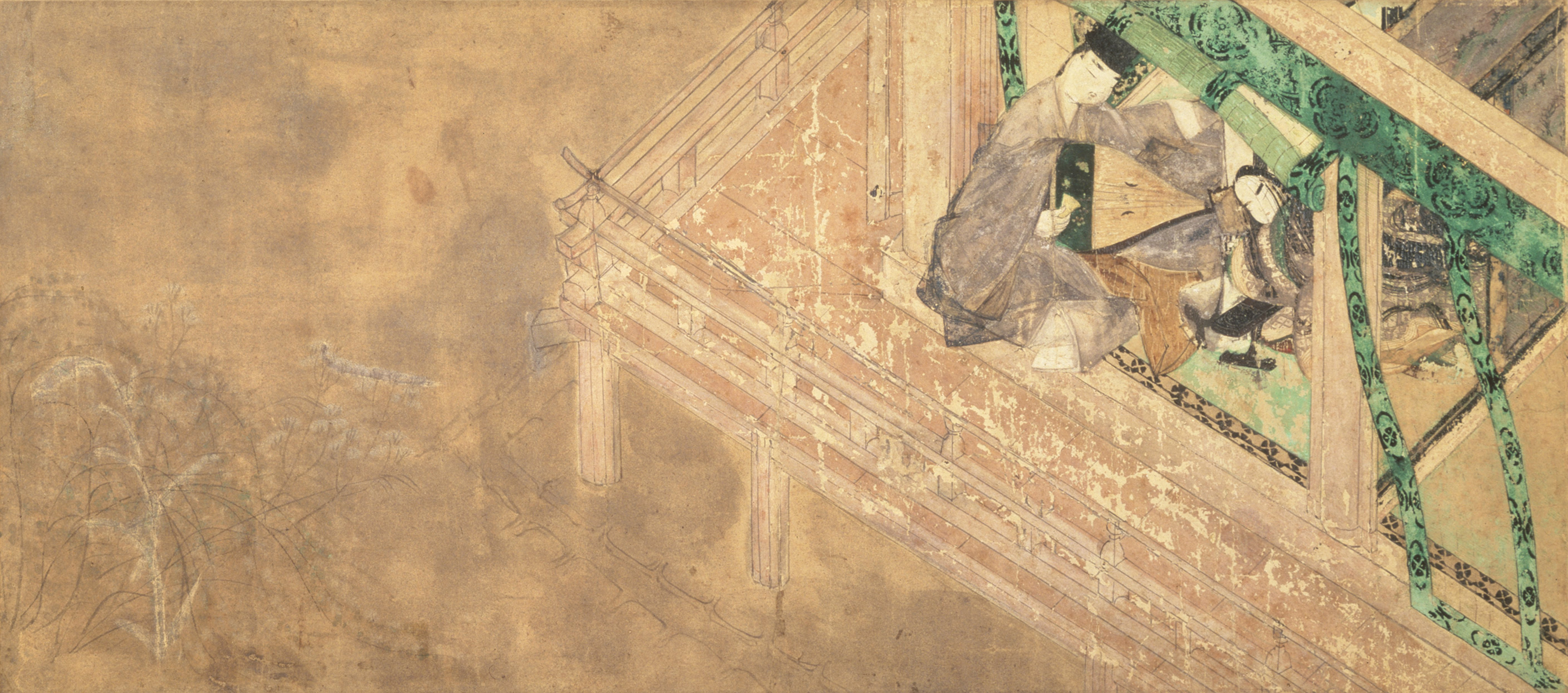
Chapter "Yadorigi" (Mistletoe)

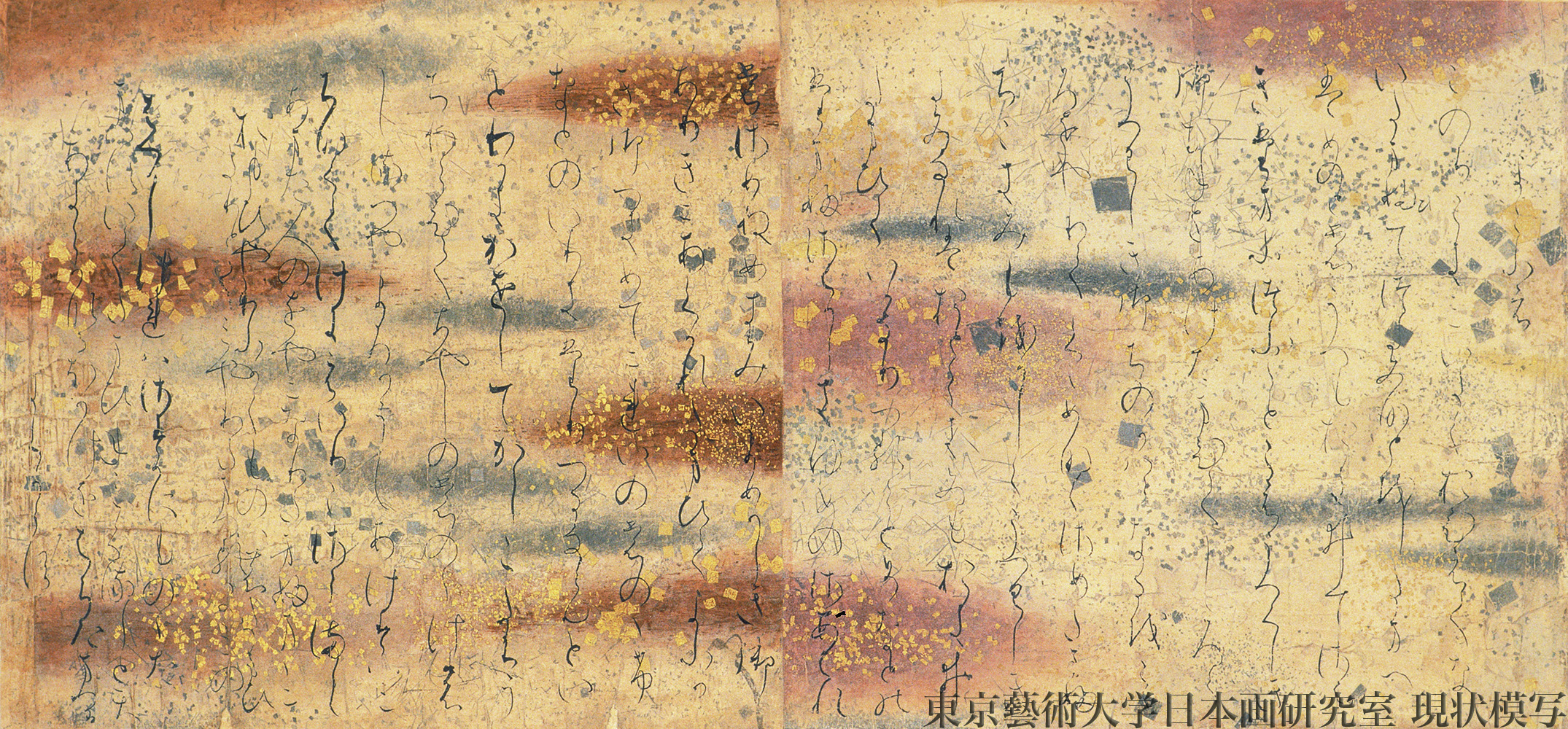
Calligraphy example from Chapter "Yadogiri" (Mistletoe)

== See also ==
- Tokugawa Garden
- Daimyo collection
- List of National Treasures of Japan (paintings)
- List of National Treasures of Japan (crafts-others)
- List of National Treasures of Japan (crafts-swords)

== Literature ==
- The Tokugawa Art Museum. Nagoya: The Tokugawa Art Museum. 1988. ASIN B000VQ5F9O.
- The Shogun Age Exhibition From The Tokugawa Art Museum. Nagoya: Shogun Age Exhibition Committee. 1985. ASIN B000UDO9BS.
