= Kenchū-ji =

Coordinates: 35°10′45″N 136°55′37″E

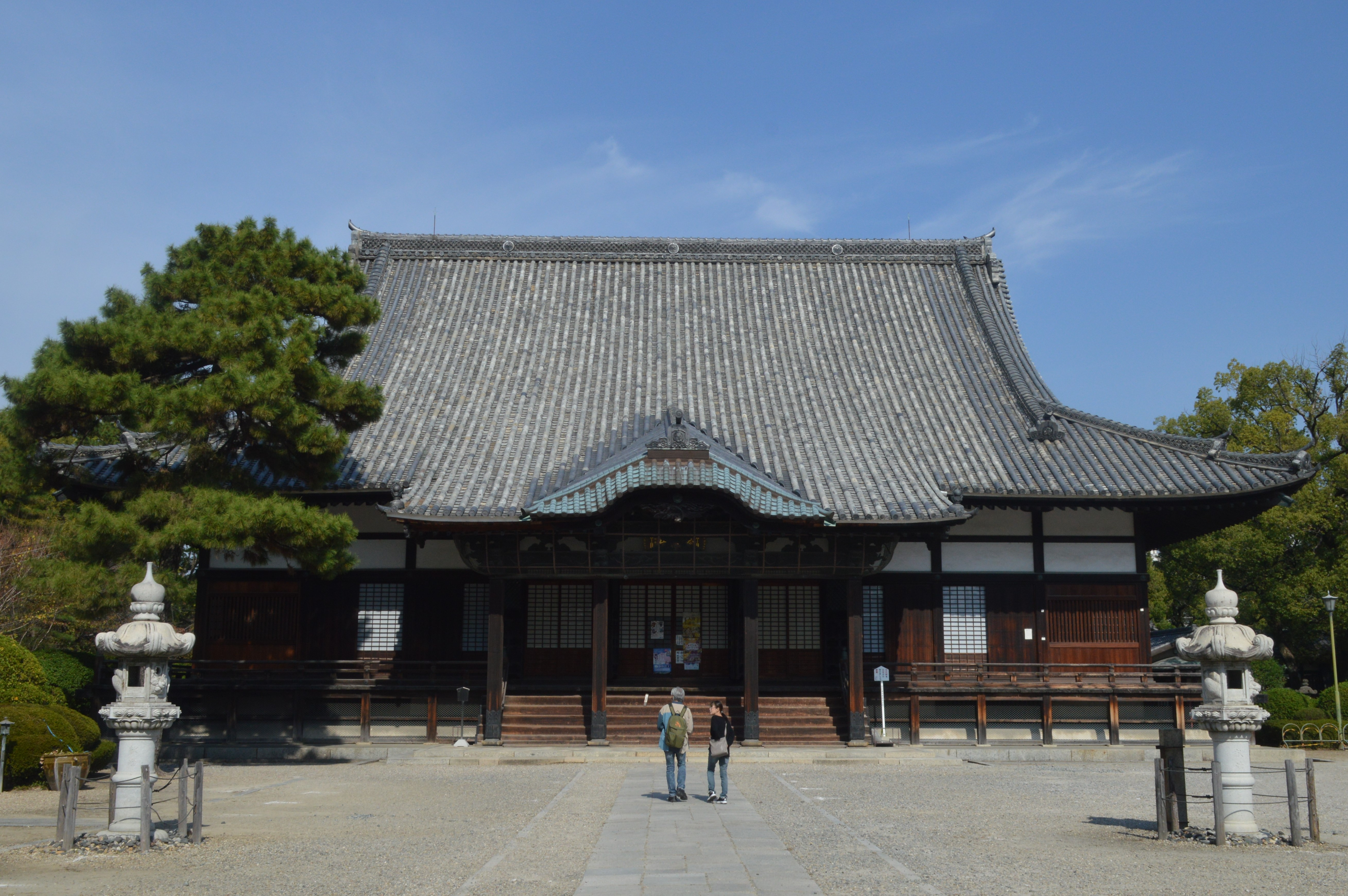

Location
- Country: Japan
- Interactive map of Kenchū-ji

Architecture
- Completed: 1651

Kenchū-ji (建中寺) is a Jōdo-shū Buddhist temple in Tsutsui, Higashi-ku, Nagoya, central Japan. Starting in the Edo period, the mausoleums of the lords of the Owari Domain were located there, making it the Bodaiji of the Owari Tokugawa family.

The present main hall of the Nagoya Tōshō-gū was a mausoleum for Lord Tokugawa Yoshinao's consort Haruhime (春姫), which used to be located at Kenchū-ji, and was moved to the site in 1953 as a replacement. It is a designated cultural property of Aichi prefecture.

== See also ==
- Jōkō-ji (Seto)
