= Sasashima-chō =

Coordinates: 35°09′57″N 136°54′04″E

Sasashima-chō (笹島町) is a neighbourhood around the area of Nagoya Station, today a part of Nakamura-ku, Nagoya, central Japan.

Sasashima ware used to be produced there during the late Edo period.

It is served by the Sasashima-raibu Station.
