= Sasashima ware =

Type of Japanese pottery

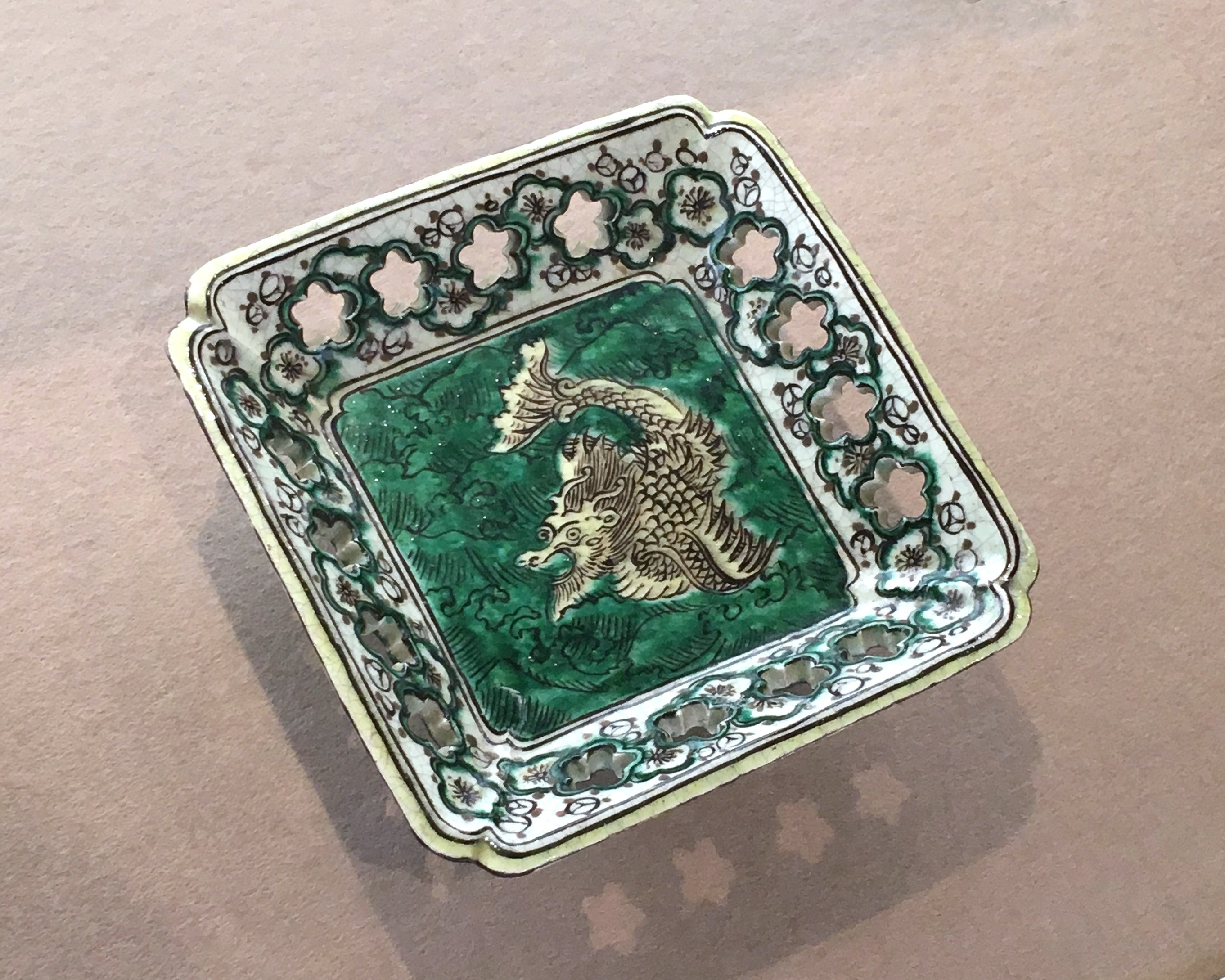
Sasashima ware square bowl, makara design. Edo period, 19th century

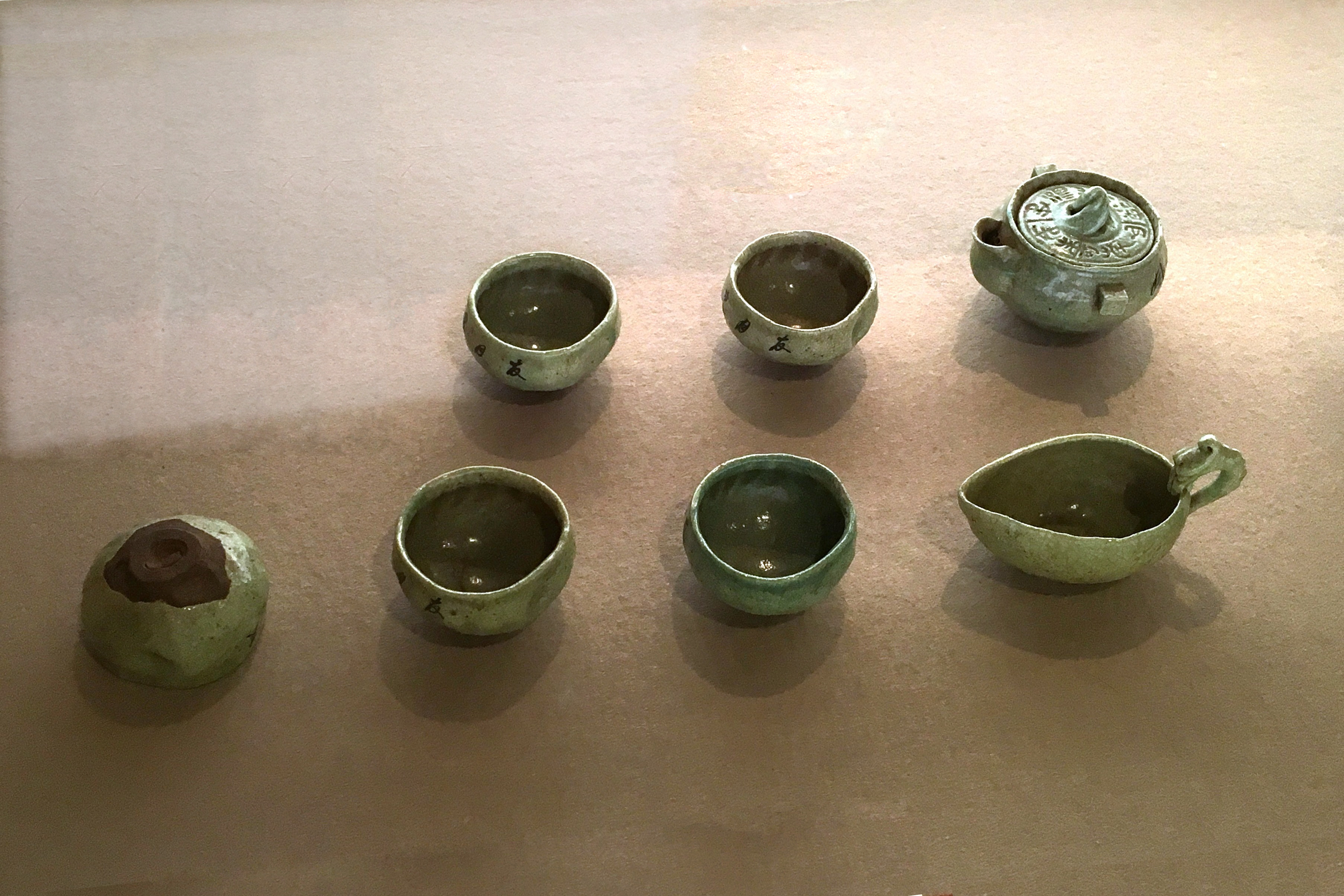
A set for sencha green tea utensils, by Maki Bokusai, Edo period, 18th-19th century

Sasashima ware (笹島焼 Sasashima-yaki) is a type of Japanese pottery from Nagoya, Owari province, later Aichi prefecture, central Japan.

== History ==
It was based in the Sasashima-chō neighbourhood, not far from Nagoya Station, today a part of Nakamura-ku, Nagoya. It was produced from 1804 to 1923 in three generations.

The first master was Maki Bunshichi, named Bokusai (1782–1857). He studied painting as well as sculpture. With his talent he tried different models, colours, and patterns on his works. He made tea and sake utensils and was praised as a master of his craft. He made Hagiyama pieces for the 12th Owari Lord Tokugawa Naritaka.

== Characteristics ==
There are various stamps with Shinojima and Sasashima with various kanji characters.

The square bowl at the Aichi Prefectural Ceramic Museum depicts a mythological whale or makara (摩竭; makatsu) and at the rim a pierced plum flower pattern. At the bottom are four feet and the stamp in a calabash form with the name "Sasashima".

In the same museum the sencha bowls with handle are done in a refined manner. On it is written "Yugetsu Kofu" which means "the moon is my friend and I am conversing with the wind", which can be traced back to a saying by a hermite. On the lid is written "bliss on the southern mountain, and from the eastern sea also comes bliss". Next to the kodai stamp is written his name.

== See also ==
During the time of the production Ofukei ware, Hagiyama ware and Toyoraku ware were also made, mostly for tea utensils.

Other pottery from Nagoya and the wider Owari region:

- Kawana ware
- Tokoname ware
- Inuyama ware
