= Toyokuni Shrine =

Toyokuni Shrine (豊国神社 or 豐國神社, Toyokuni-jinja), alternately read Hōkoku Shrine (Hōkoku-jinja), refers to a number of Shinto shrines in Japan dedicated to kampaku and ruler of Japan Toyotomi Hideyoshi. The two names are different readings of the same kanji and are used interchangeably for some shrines.

Toyokuni Shrine or Hōkoku Shrine may refer to:

- Hōkoku Shrine (Osaka) in Osaka, Osaka Prefecture
- Toyokuni Shrine (Kanazawa) in Kanazawa, Ishikawa Prefecture
- Toyokuni Shrine (Nagoya) in Nagoya, Aichi Prefecture
- Toyokuni Shrine (Kyoto) in Kyoto, Kyoto Prefecture
- Toyokuni Shrine, located on the grounds of Itsukushima Shrine in Hatsukaichi, Hiroshima Prefecture

== See also ==
- Toyokuni (disambiguation)
