= Aichi Junior College =

Coordinates: 34°44′25.36″N 137°23′14.73″E

- 愛知大学短期大学部
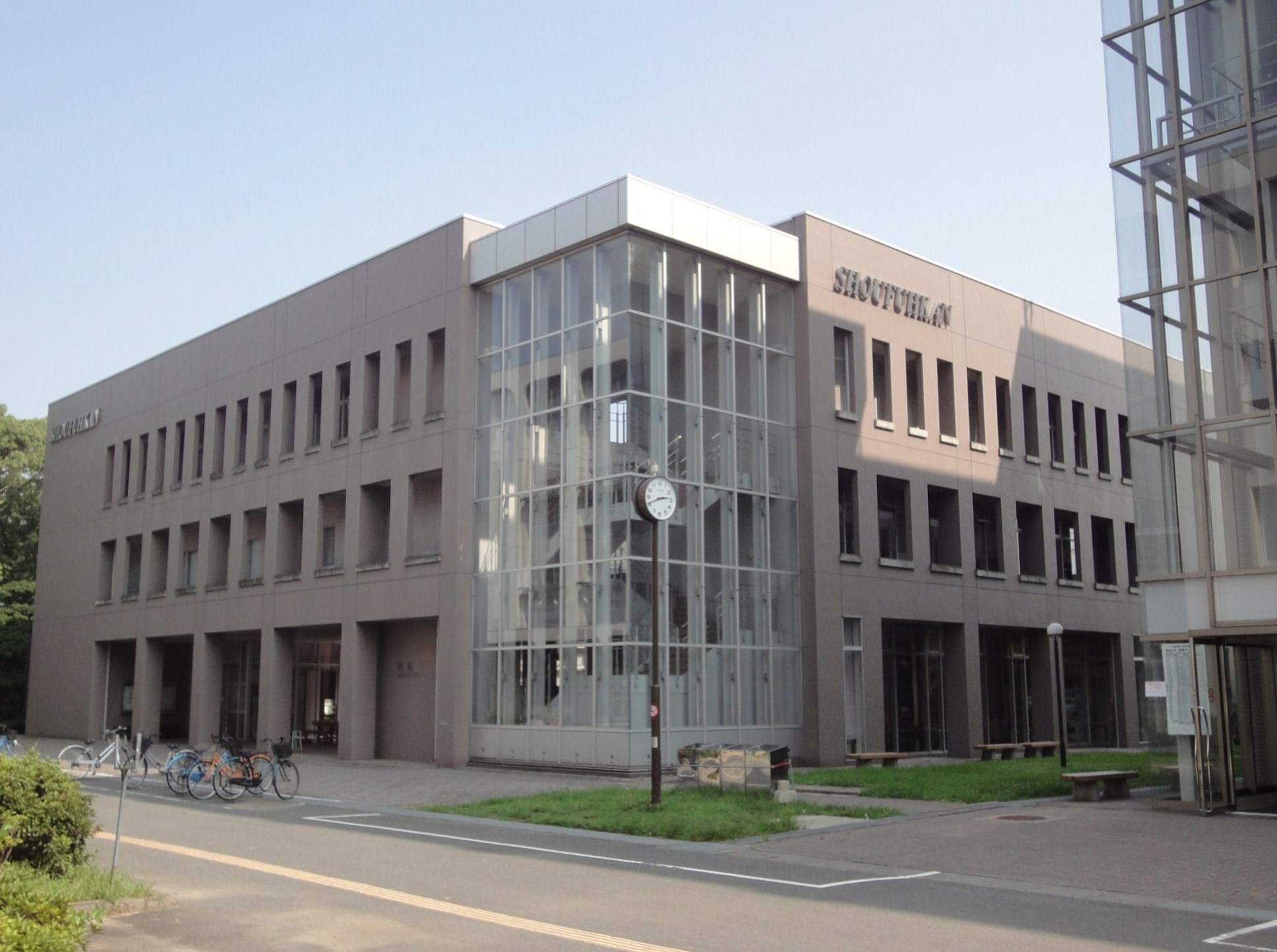
- Shoufuhkan of Aichi University
- Established: 1950
- Location: Toyohashi, Aichi, Japan
- Website: http://jcweb.aichi-u.ac.jp/index.html

Aichi Junior College (愛知大学短期大学部, Aichi Daigaku Tanki Daigakubu) or sometimes Aichi University Junior College is a private junior college in Toyohashi, Aichi, Japan.

== History ==
The junior college was founded in 1950 with two academic departments: Literature, and Law and Economics. In 1961, a third academic department, Life Sciences, was set up for women only. In 1979, the department of Law and Economics was discontinued. In 2000 the departments of Life Science, and Literature were renamed. In 2005 the two were merged into one.

== See also ==
- Aichi University
