= Hōkoku Shrine (Osaka) =

Shinto shrine in Osaka Prefecture, Japan

Hōkoku Shrine 豊國神社
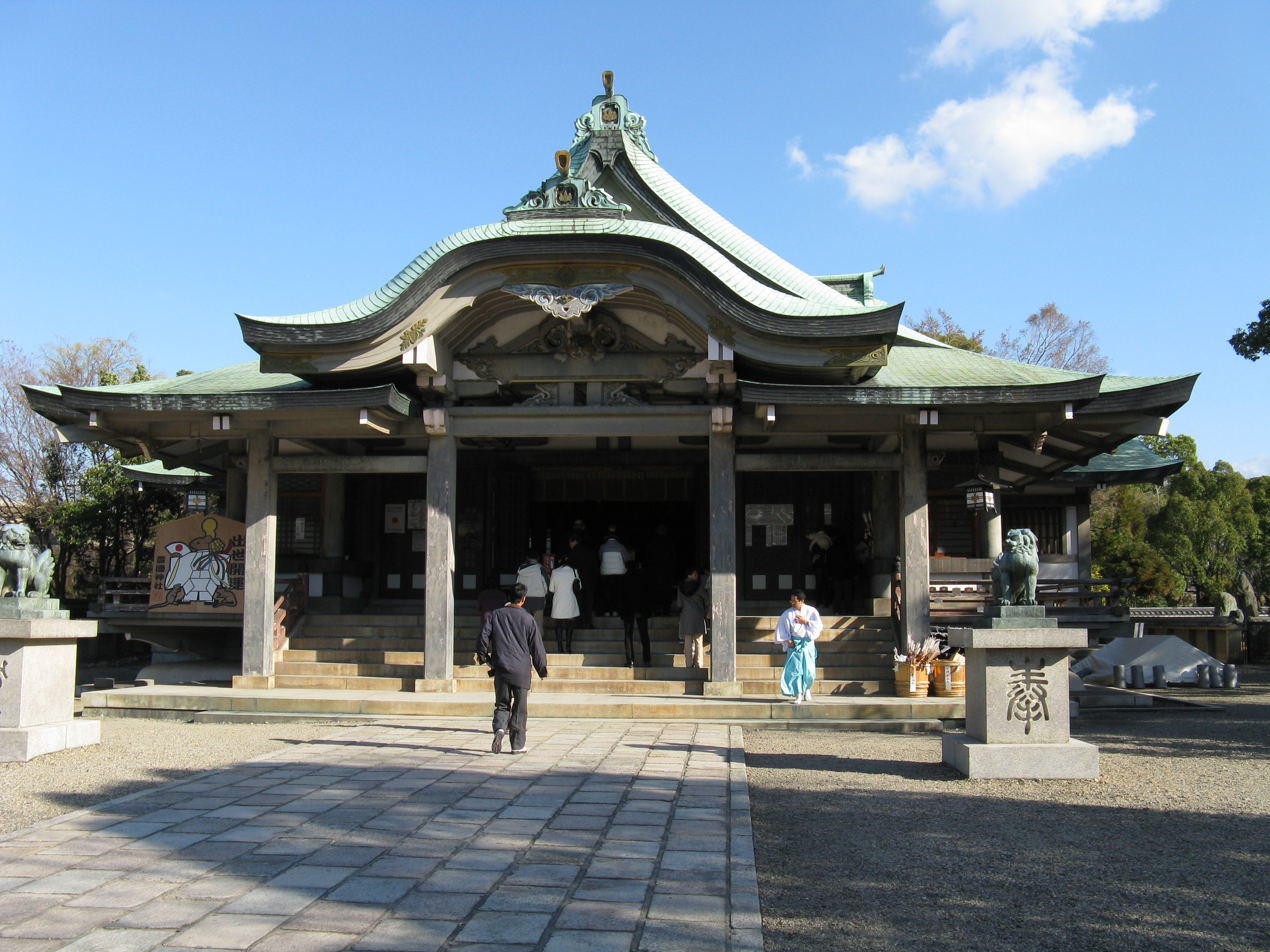
- Main building at Hōkoku Shrine

- Location within Japan

Religion
- Affiliation: Shinto
- Deity: Toyotomi Hideyoshi; Toyotomi Hideyori; Toyotomi Hidenaga

Location
- Location: 2-1 Ōsaka-jō, Chūō-ku, Ōsaka-shi, Ōsaka-fu; 540-0002
- Interactive map of Hōkoku Shrine 豊國神社
- Coordinates: 34°41′03″N 135°31′37″E

Architecture
- Established: 1879

Website
- www.apsara.ne.jp/houkoku/index.htm

Hōkoku Shrine (豊國神社, Hōkoku-jinja) is a Shinto shrine located in Osaka, Japan. It is one of several Toyokuni shrines built in honor of Toyotomi Hideyoshi. It is part of the Osaka Castle Park.

== History ==
Hōkoku Shrine was ordered built in the 12th year of Meiji (1879) by the Emperor.

== Images ==
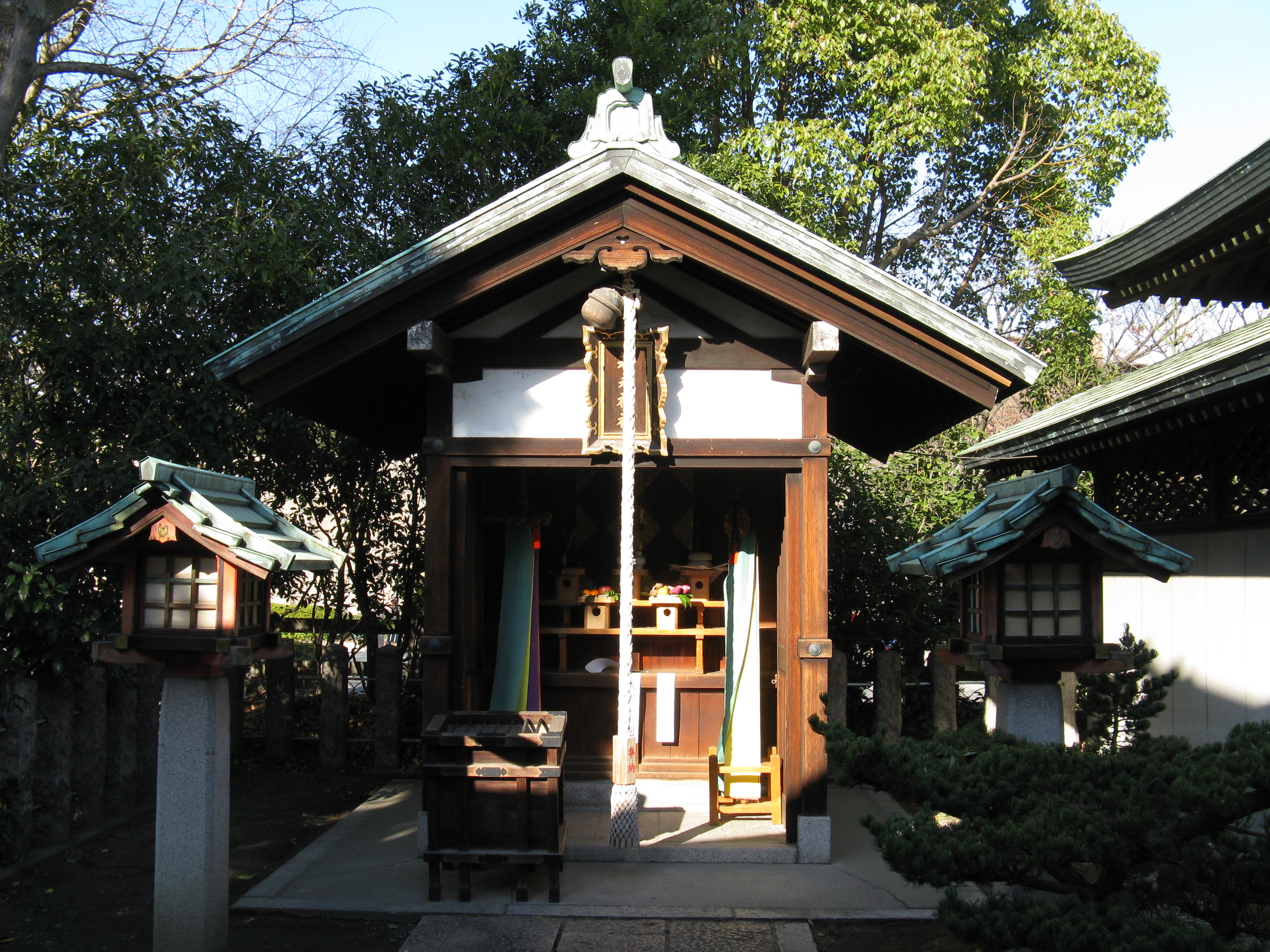

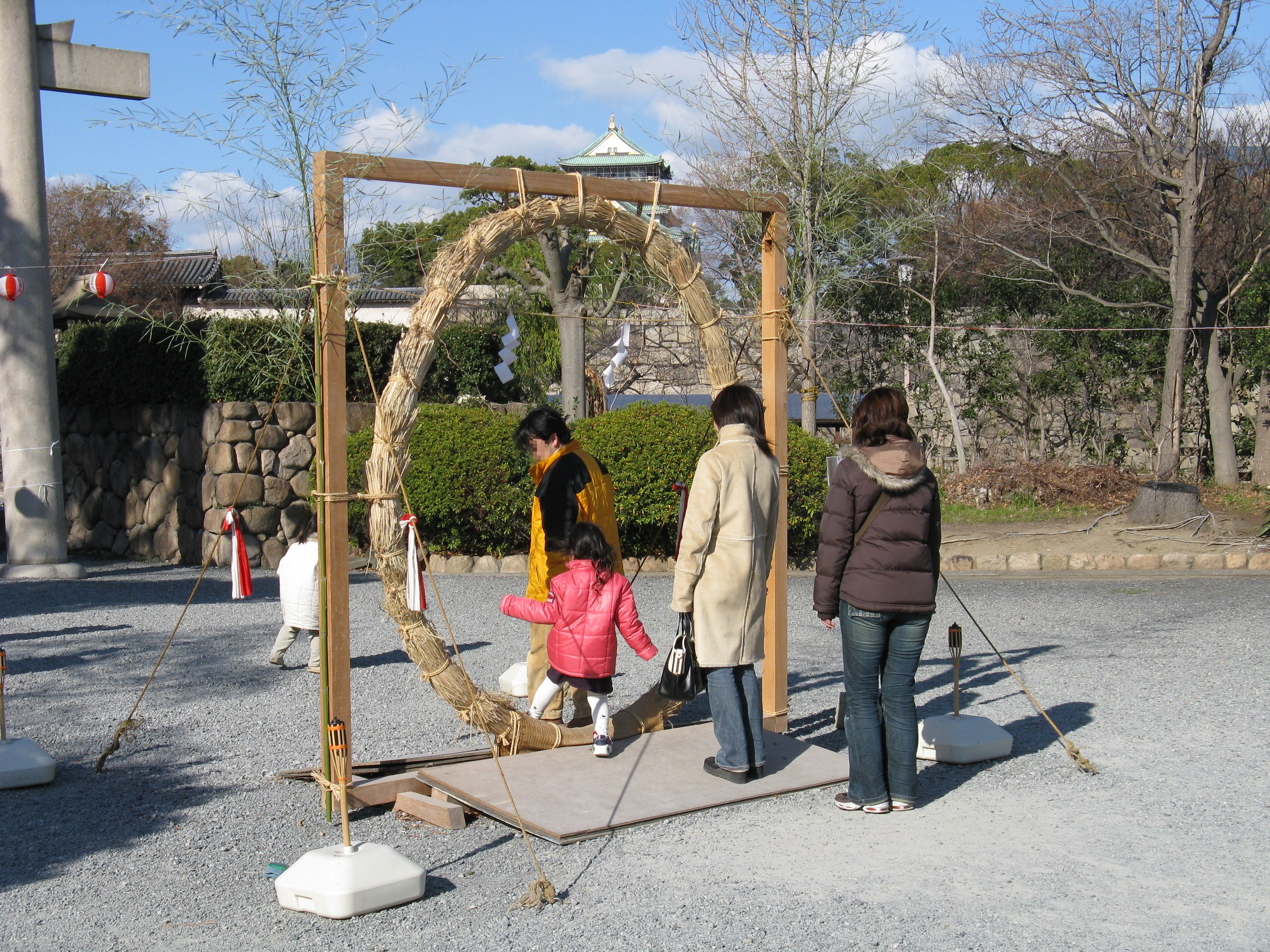

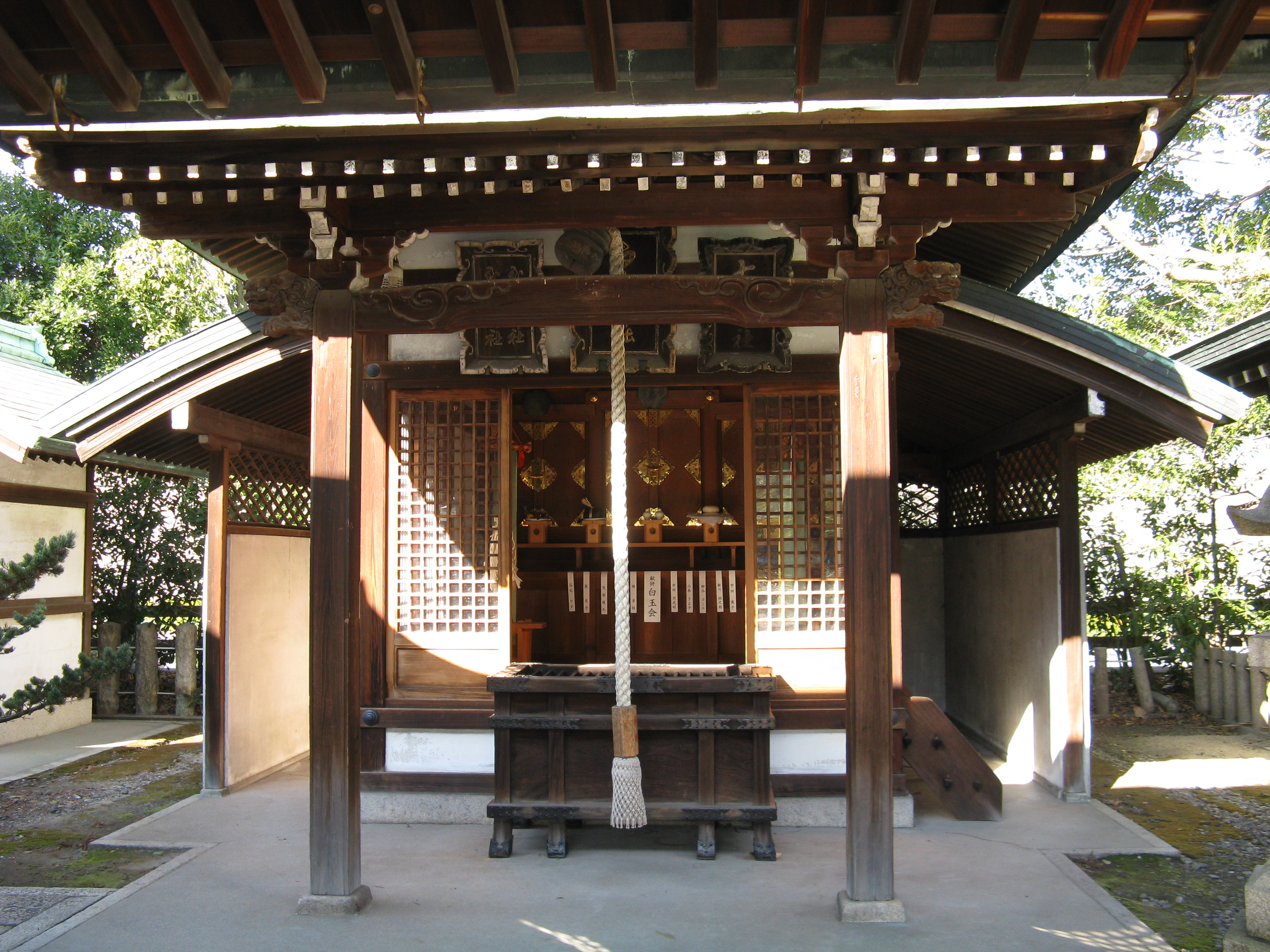

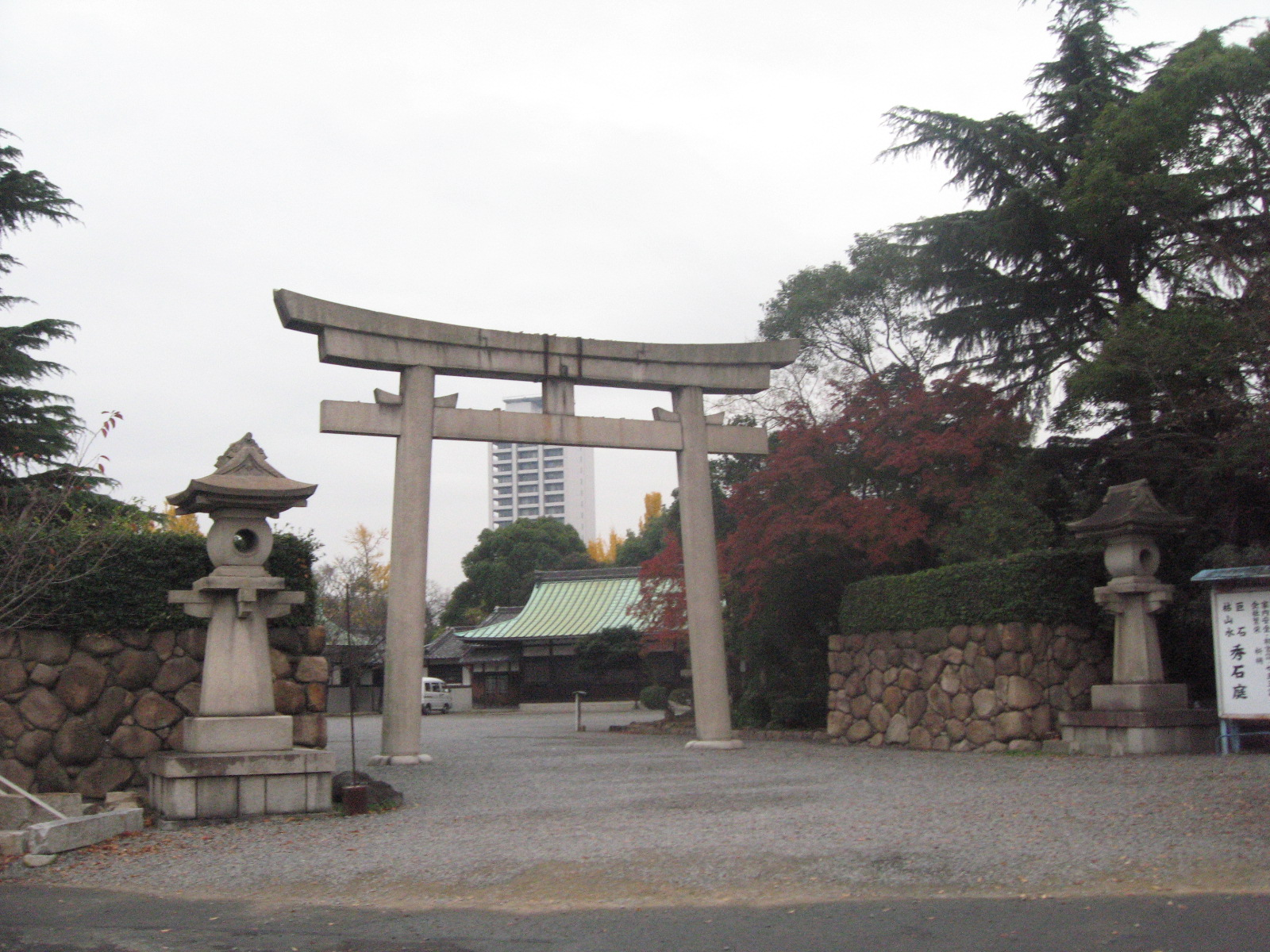

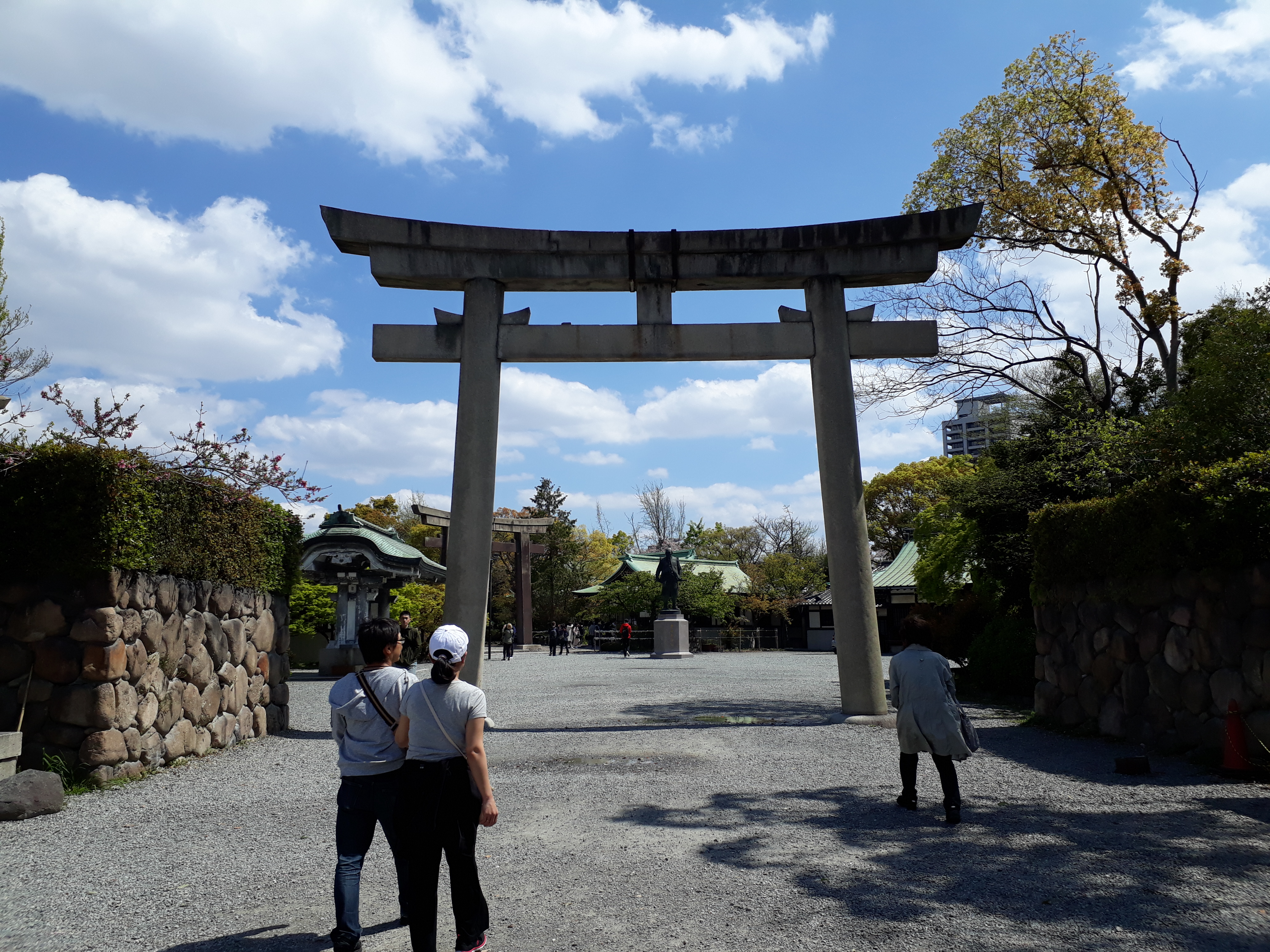
View of Shinshu Ueda Yukimurazakura that leads to the Hokoku Shrine & Banquet Hall.

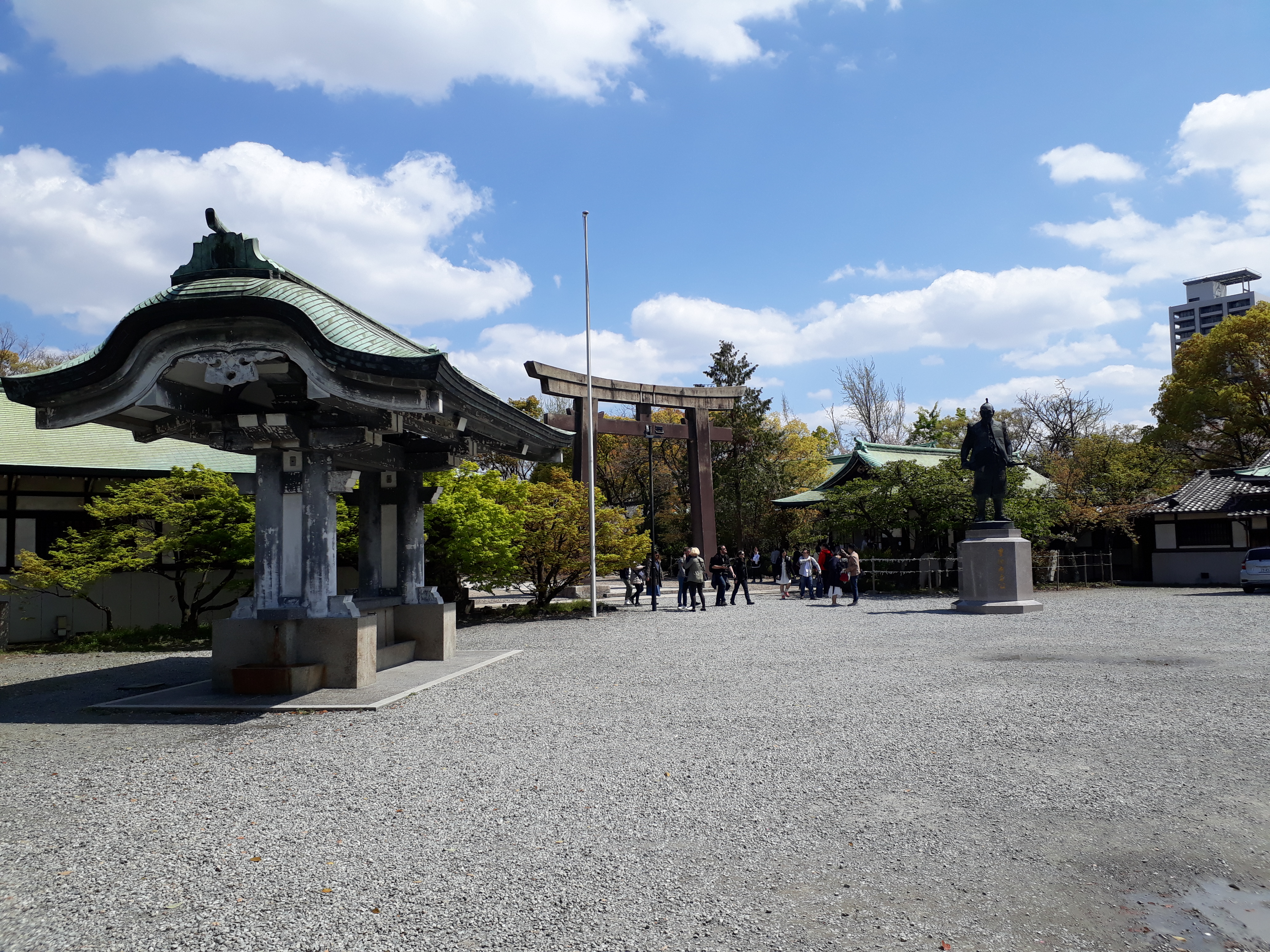
View of Temizuya, bronze statue of Toyotomi Hideyoshi, and the 2nd torii gate, seen upon passing through the Shinshu Ueda Ukimurazakura (torii gate), located in front of the Hokoku Shrine. On the far right is the edge of the Banquet Hall.

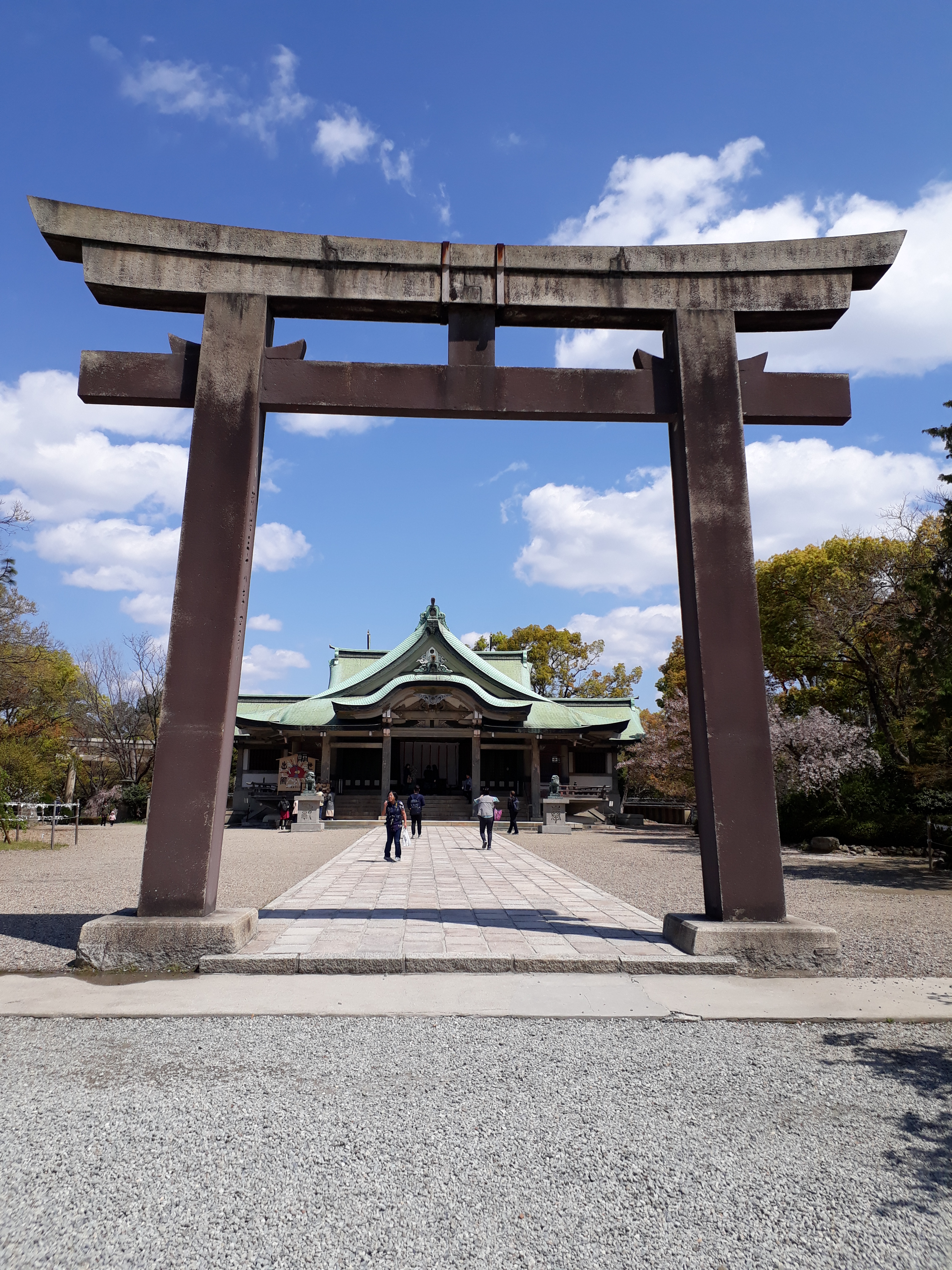
Front View of Hokoku Shrine from the 2nd Torii Gate

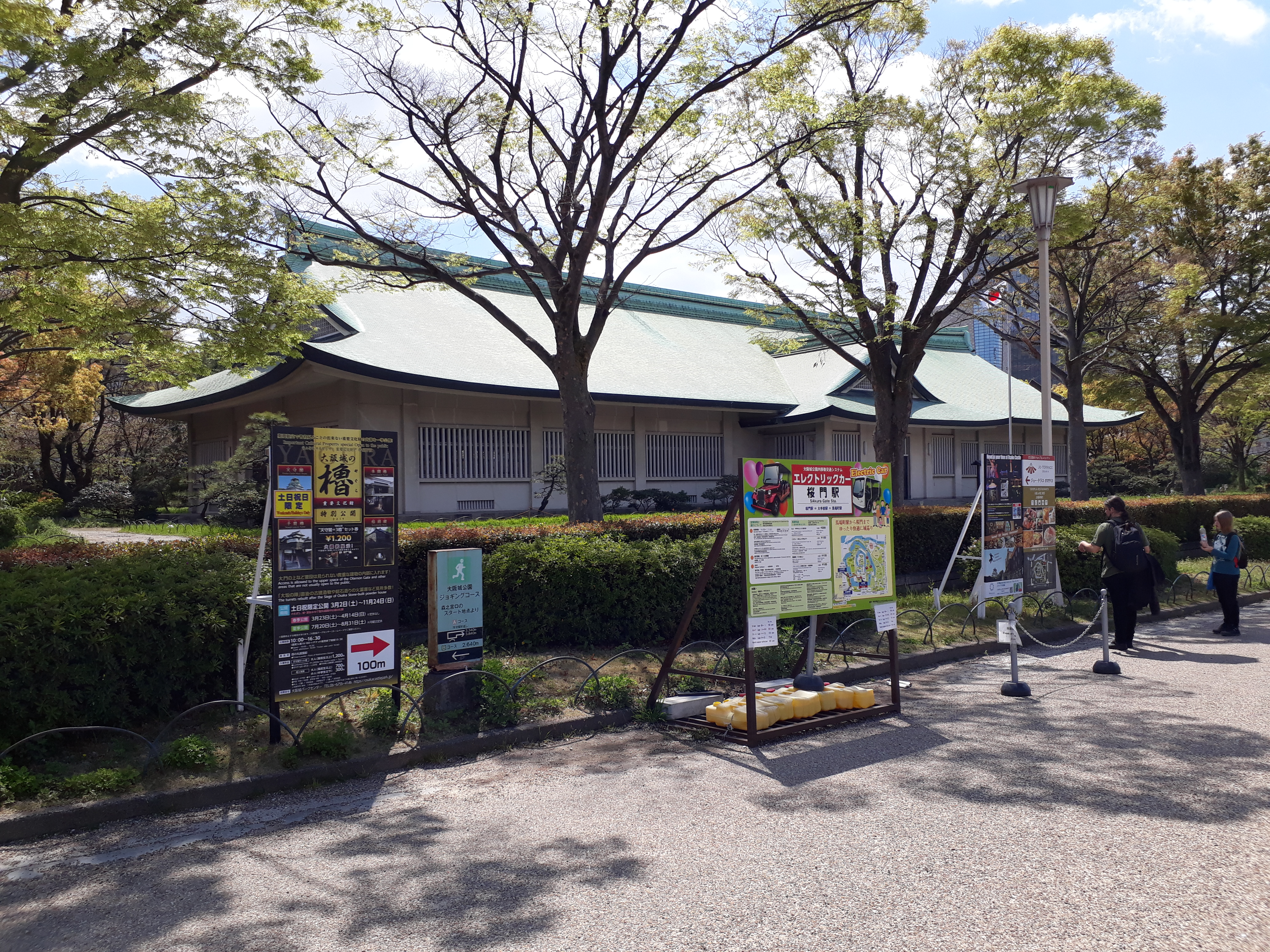
The Shudokan Martial Arts Hall located adjacent to the Hokoku Shrine.

== See also ==
- Toyotomi Hideyoshi
- Toyokuni Shrines
