= Doho University =

Private university in Nakamura-ku, Nagoya, Aichi Prefecture, Japan

- 同朋大学
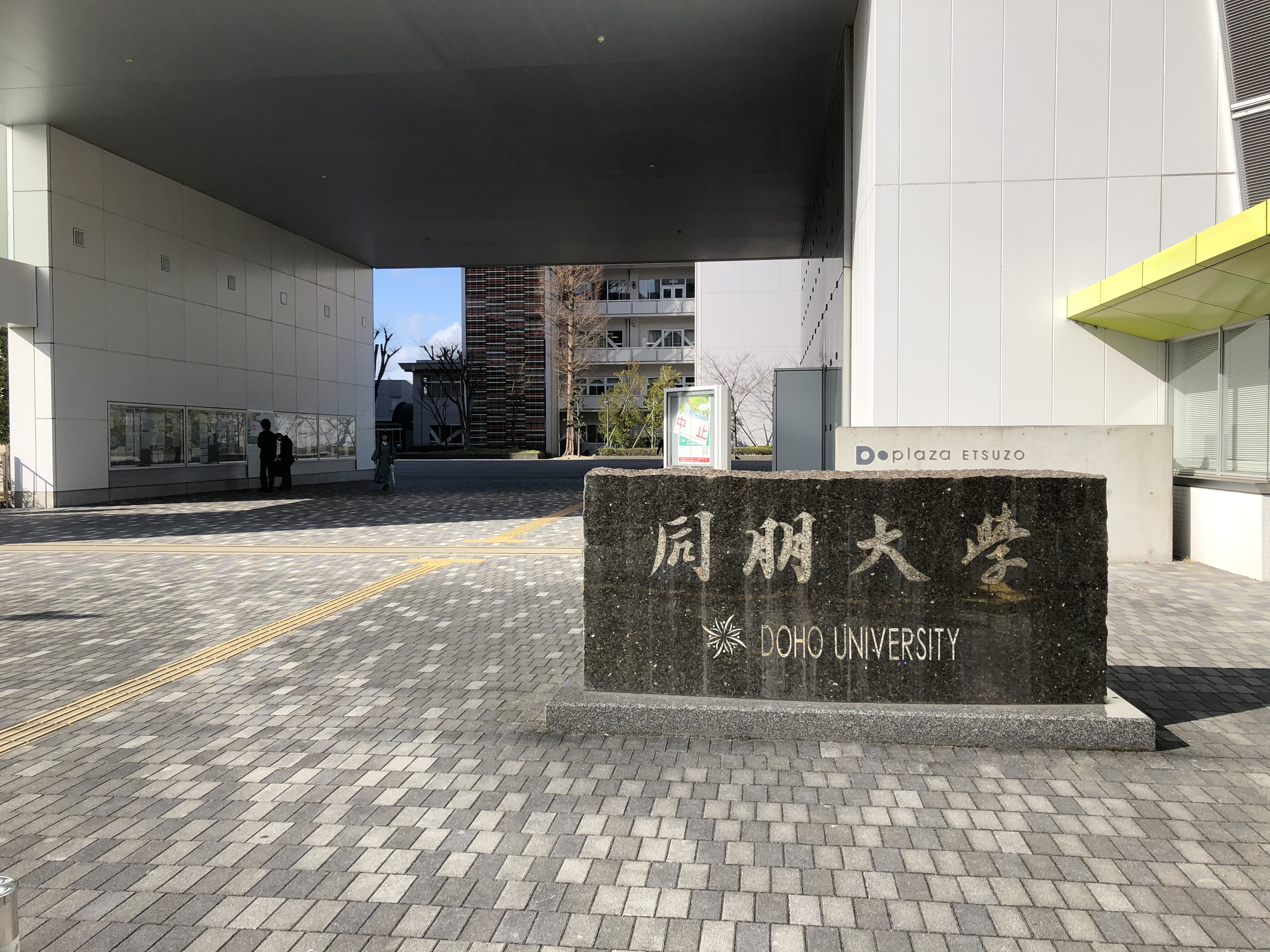
- Type: Private
- Established: 1826; 200 years ago
- Location: Nakamura-ku, Nagoya, Japan; 35.1635°N 136.8441°E
- Campus: Urban
- Website: www.doho.ac.jp (in Japanese)

Doho University (同朋大学, Dōhō daigaku) is a private university in Nakamura-ku, Nagoya, Aichi Prefecture, Japan. The predecessor of the school was founded in 1826, and it was chartered in 1950. It includes the Nagoya College of Music (名古屋音楽大学, Nagoya Ongaku Daigaku), also known locally as Meion (名音). The university is affiliated with the Jōdo Shinshū sect (浄土真宗, "True Pure Land School") of Buddhism.
