= Sasashima-raibu Station =

Railway station in Nagoya, Japan

Sasashima-raibu Station ささしまライブ駅
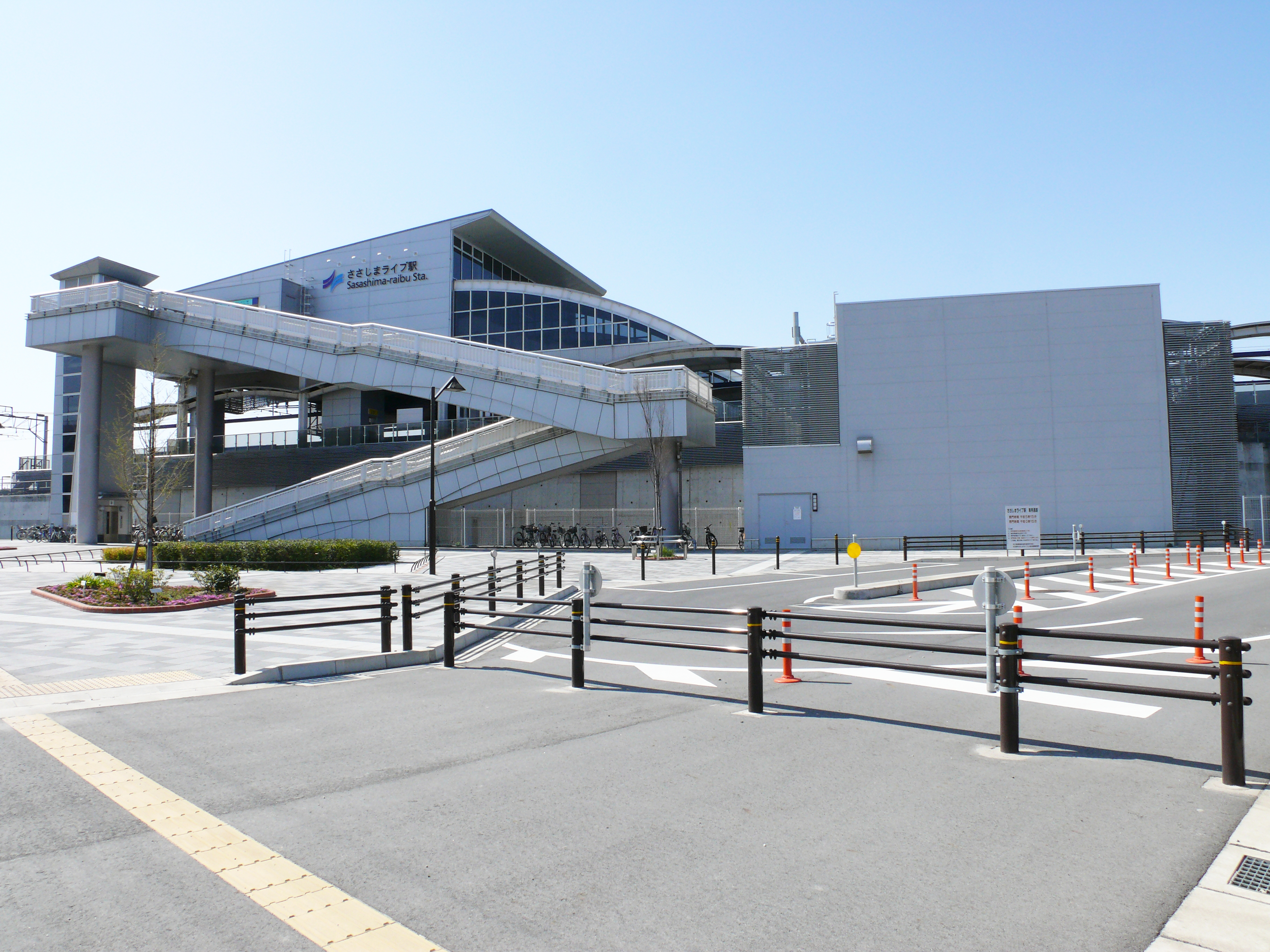
- Station exterior

General information
- Location: Nakamura-ku, Nagoya; Japan
- Coordinates: 35°9′43″N 136°52′55″E
- Operator: Nagoya Rinkai Rapid Transit
- Line: Aonami Line
- Distance: 0.8 km from Nagoya
- Platforms: 2 side platforms
- Tracks: 2

Other information
- Station code: AN02
- Website: Official website

History
- Opened: October 6, 2004

Passengers
- 2017: 5,400
Location
- Location within Japan

Sasashima-raibu Station (ささしまライブ駅, Sasashima-raibu-eki) is a railway station on the Aonami Line in Nakamura-ku, Nagoya, Japan, operated by the third sector railway operator Nagoya Rinkai Rapid Transit.

== History ==
Sasashima-raibu Station was built on the former site of Sasashima Freight Terminal, which sat at the junction between the Kansai Main Line and Tōkaidō Main Line. At its peak, the freight terminal handled the majority of cargo for the city of Nagoya. However, the freight terminal was closed and dismantled in 1986 in favor of the larger Nagoya Freight Terminal in Nakagawa-ku, near current-day Nakajima Station.

Sasashima-raibu Station was completed in 2004, along with the rest of the line. The station name was taken from Sasashima-raibu 24-ku, an urban renewal project where the former freight terminal stood. The station was completed in time to serve the Expo 2005, which had a satellite site in Sasashima-raibu 24-ku named "De･La･Fantasia".

Though Sasashima-raibu Station and Komeno Station are only 150 m apart, the two stations are divided by a wide set of train tracks and were not accessible through foot traffic. Therefore, a pedestrian overpass was built in 2011 that spans the tracks.

== Station layout ==
The station consists of two elevated side platforms serving two tracks.

=== Platforms ===
1	■ Aonami Line	for Kinjō-futō
2	■ Aonami Line	for Nagoya

== Adjacent stations ==
«	Service	»
Aonami Line
Non-stop: Does not stop at this station
Nagoya	Local	Komoto

== Surrounding area ==
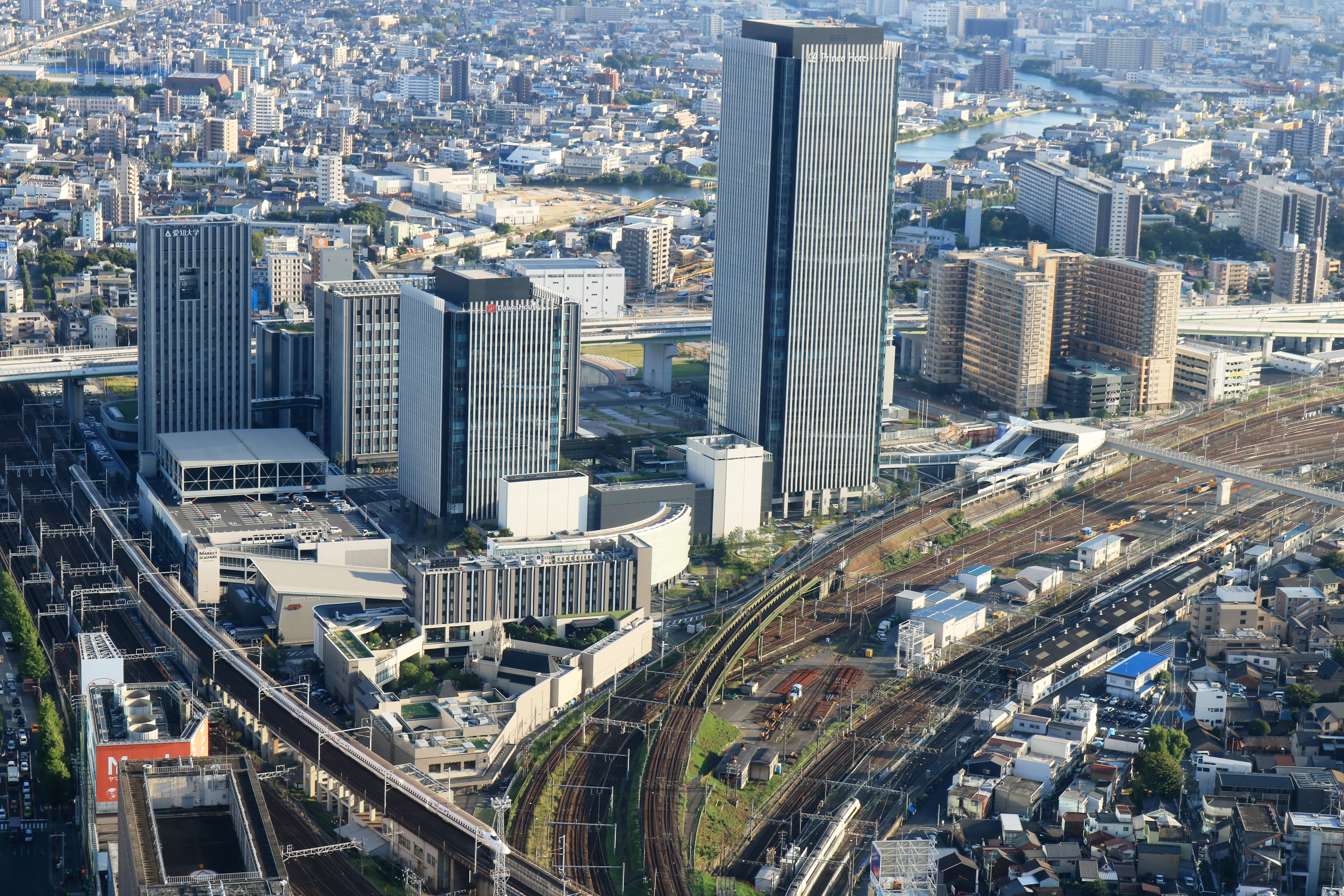
Sasashima-raibu Station and the adjoining Sasahima-raibu 24-ku in September 2017

- Aichi University Nagoya Campus
- Zepp Nagoya
- Nagoya Prince Hotel Sky Tower
- Chūkyō Television Broadcasting Headquarters

== See also ==
- List of railway stations in Japan
