= Nagoya College of Music =

Coordinates: 35.1635°N 136.8441°E

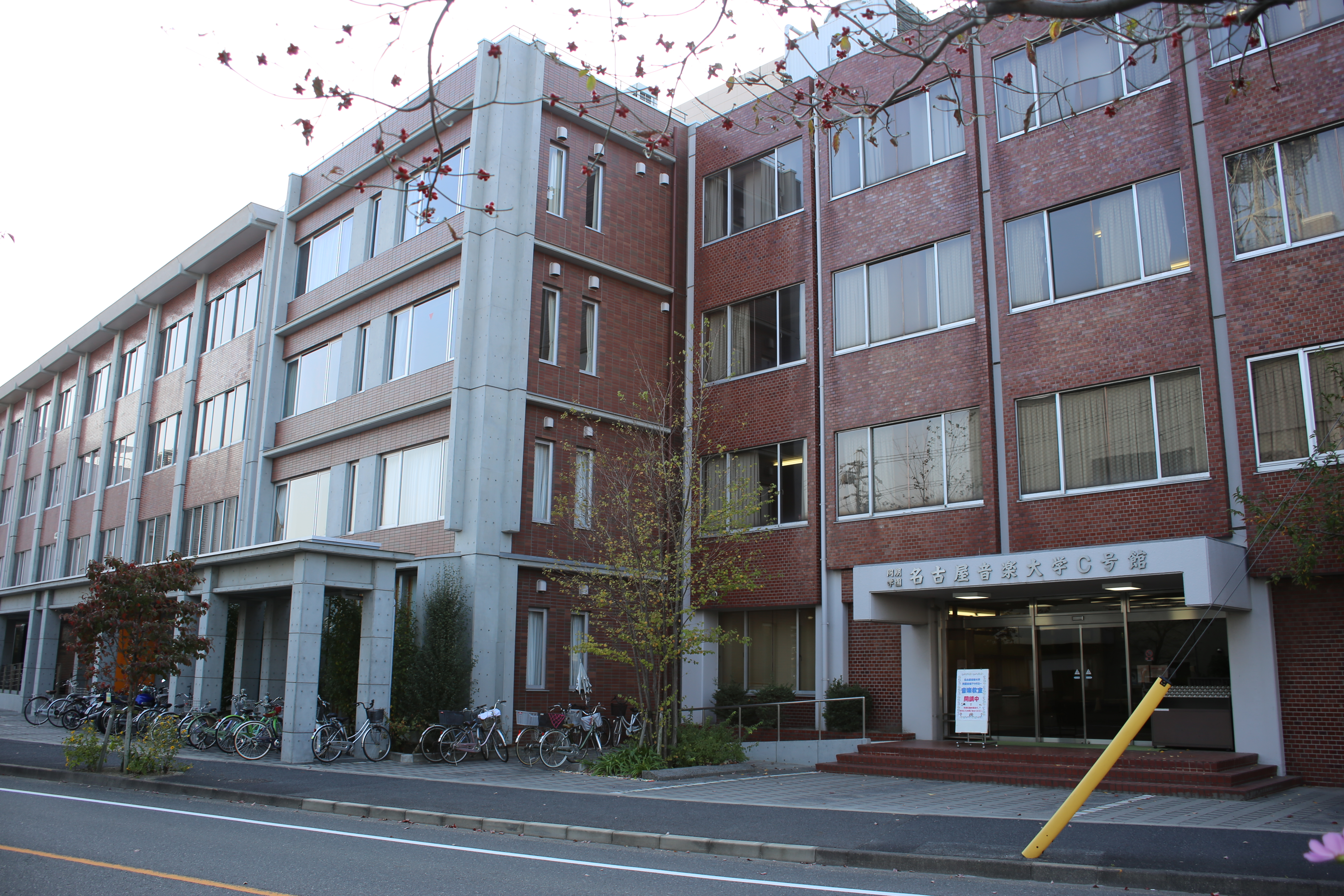
Nagoya College of Music Building

Nagoya College of Music (名古屋音楽大学, Nagoya Ongaku Daigaku) is a private university at Nakamura-ku, Nagoya, Aichi Prefecture, Japan. The school was founded as a junior college in 1965 and became a four-year college in 1976. The school is also known locally as Meion (名音). It is sister school of Doho University.
