= Toyokuni =

Toyokuni may refer to:

- Utagawa Toyokuni (1769–1825), designer of ukiyo-e Japanese woodblock prints
- Utagawa Toyokuni II (1777–1835), designer of ukiyo-e Japanese woodblock prints, also known as Toyoshige
- Utagawa Toyokuni III (1786–1865), designer of ukiyo-e Japanese woodblock prints, also known as Kunisada
- Toyokuni Fukuma (1893–1942), Japanese sumo wrestler
- Toyokuni Susumu (born 1937), Japanese sumo wrestler
- Toyo Province, or also Toyo Kuni, an old province of Japan, in the areas of Ōita and Fukuoka Prefectures
- Toyokuni Shrine (disambiguation), several Shinto shrines dedicated to shōgun Toyotomi Hideyoshi
