= Nakamura-ku, Nagoya =

Ward of Nagoya in Chūbu, Japan

Nakamura 中村区
- Ward
- Nakamura Ward
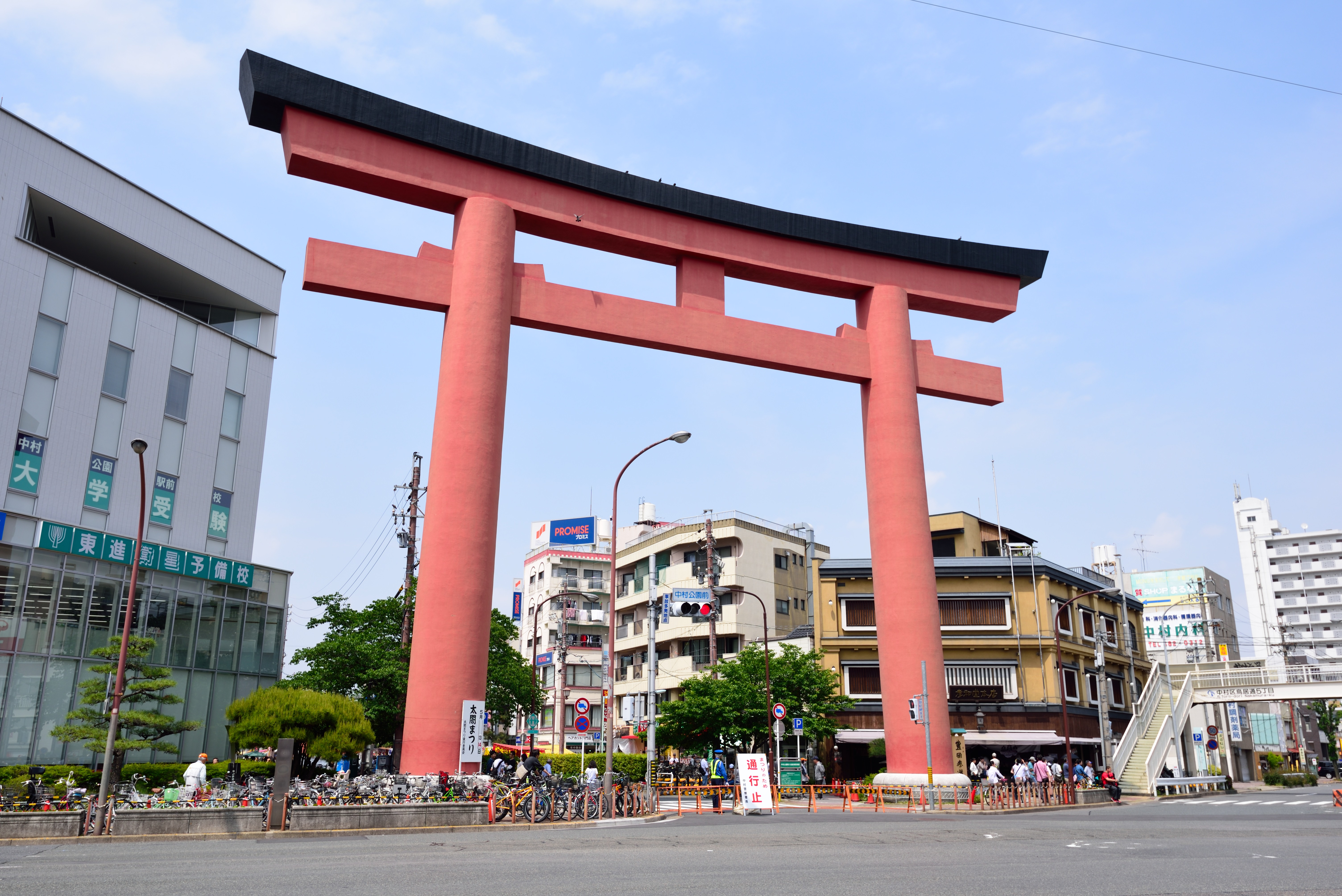
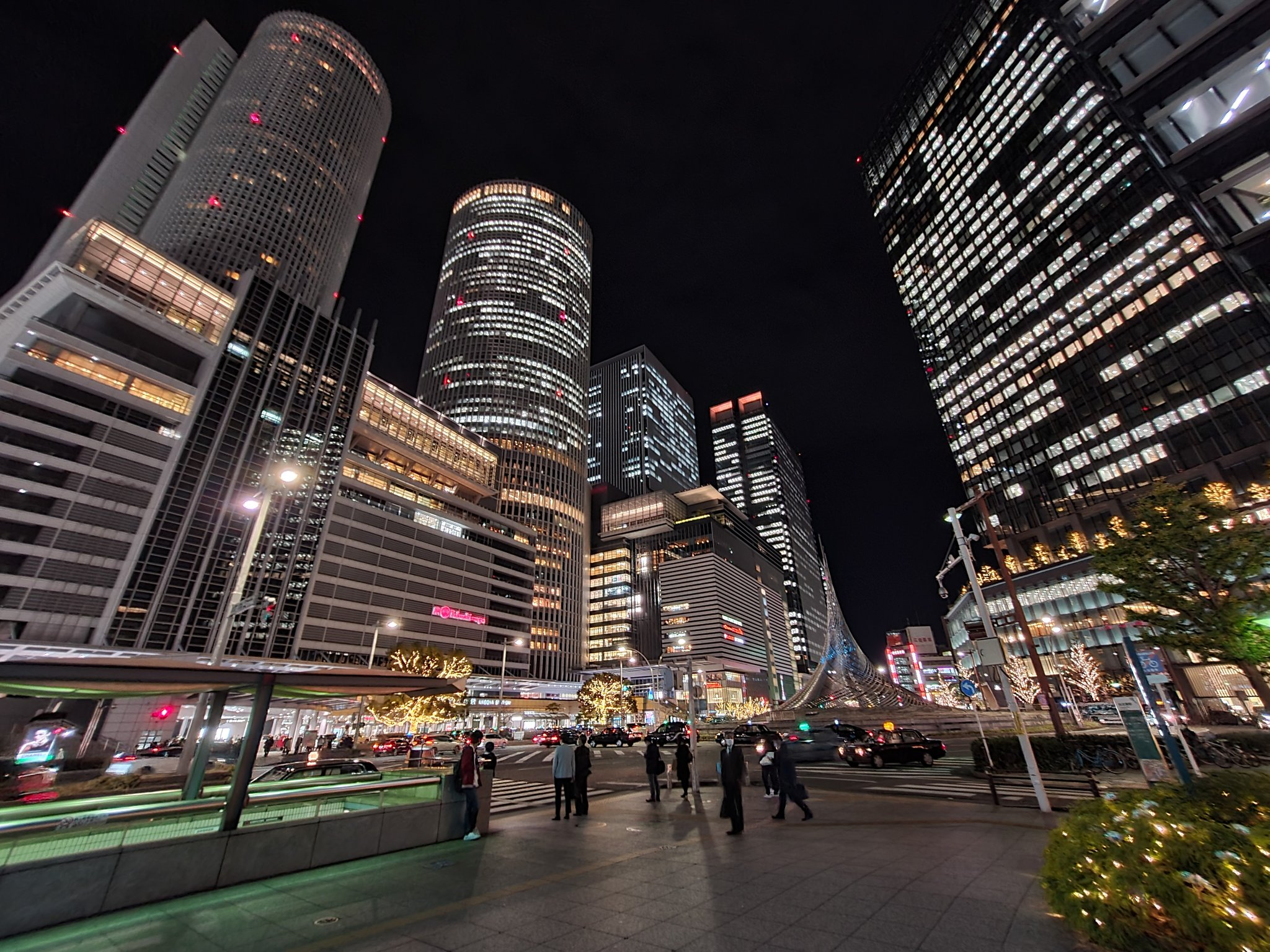
- Toyokuni Shrine（Nakamura Park） JR Central Towers of Nagoya Station serves as the headquarters of the Central Japan Railway Company

- Location of Nakamura in Nagoya City

- Location in Japan
- Coordinates: 35°10′7″N 136°52′23″E
- Country: Japan
- Region: Chūbu region Tōkai region
- Prefecture: Aichi Prefecture

Area
  - Total: 16.30 km^{2} (6.29 sq mi)

Population (October 1, 2019)
  - Total: 135,134
  - Density: 8,290/km^{2} (21,470/sq mi)
- Time zone: UTC+09:00 (JST)
- Ward office address: 1-23-1 Matsubara-chō, Nakamura-ku, Nagoya-shi, Aichi 〒453-8501
- Website: www.city.nagoya.jp/nakamura/ (in Japanese)
- Symbols
- Flower: Narcissus (Daffodil)

Nakamura (中村区, Nakamura-ku) is one of the 16 wards of Nagoya, Japan. As of October 1, 2019, the ward has an estimated population of 135,134 and a population density of 8,290 persons per km^{2}. The total area is 16.30 km^{2}.

== History ==
Nakamura Ward is famous as the birthplace of Toyotomi Hideyoshi.

One of the merchant areas is called Funairi-chō, which is close to the Hori Canal. The area was heavily damaged during the bombing of Nagoya in World War II. One of the houses that was saved from there is the Tōmatsu House.

The modern ward was officially established on October 1, 1937; 88 years ago.

== Places ==
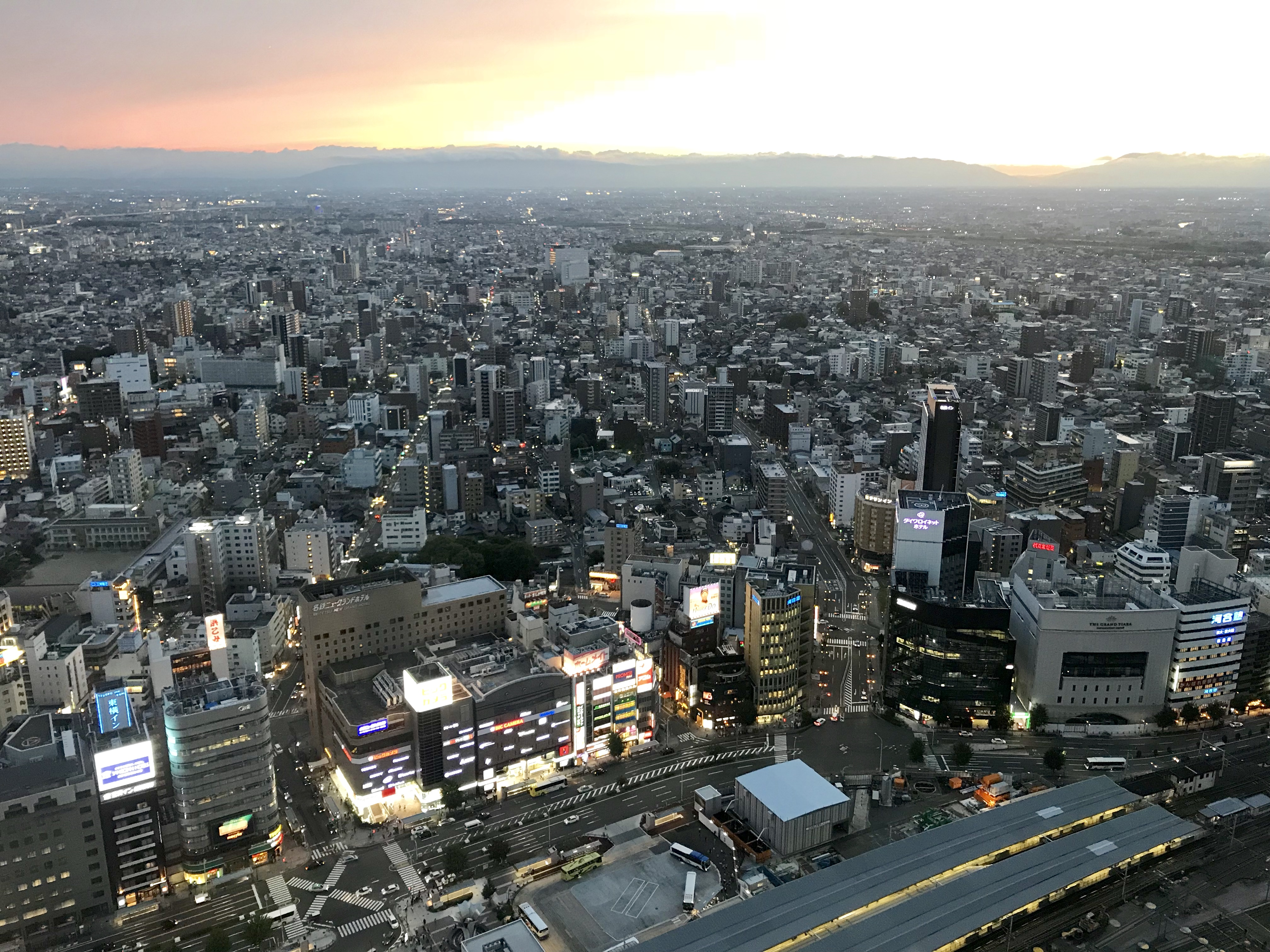
from Nagoya Marriott Associa Hotel

JR Nagoya Station, Meitetsu Nagoya Station and Kintetsu Nagoya Station are all located next to each other in the ward's Meieki district. Adjoining these train stations are several department stores, including Matsuzakaya, the Meitetsu Department Store and Kintetsu Pass'e.

To the west of the station is Nagoya's only Islamic house of worship, the Nagoya Mosque, which was established in 1998.

== Economy ==
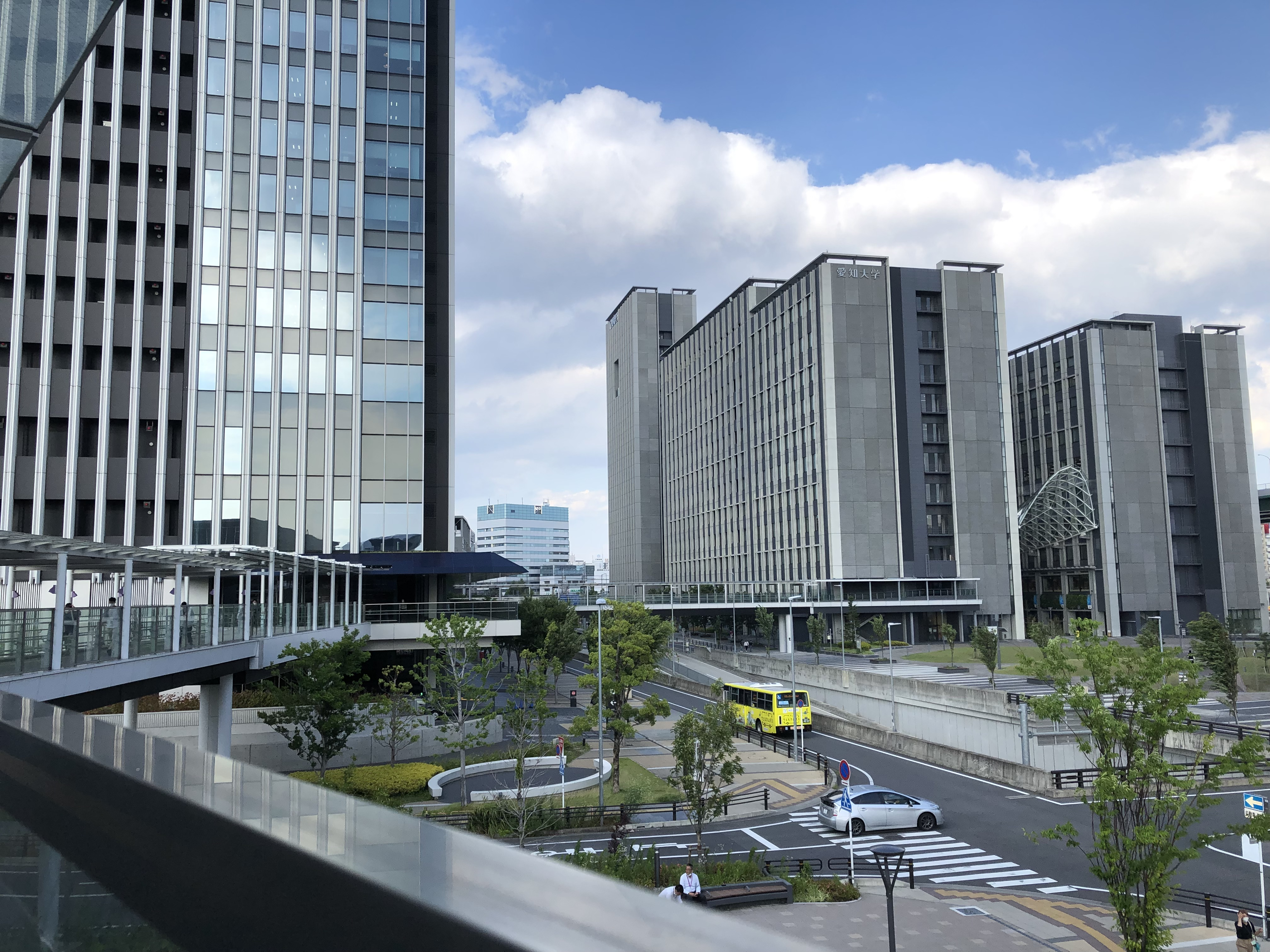
Sasashima-raibu 24

The Central Japan Railway Company has its headquarters in the JR Central Towers in Meieki. Aoki's Pizza has its headquarters in Nakamura-ku. DMG Mori Seiki has its headquarters in Nakamura-ku.

Air France has an office in the Nagoya-Daiya Building in Nakamura-ku.

Sub CBD

- Sasashima-raibu 24
  - Chūkyō Television Broadcasting
  - Global Gate
  - Japan International Cooperation Agency Chūbu (JICA Chūbu)
  - Market Square Sasashima
  - Zepp Nagoya

== Education ==
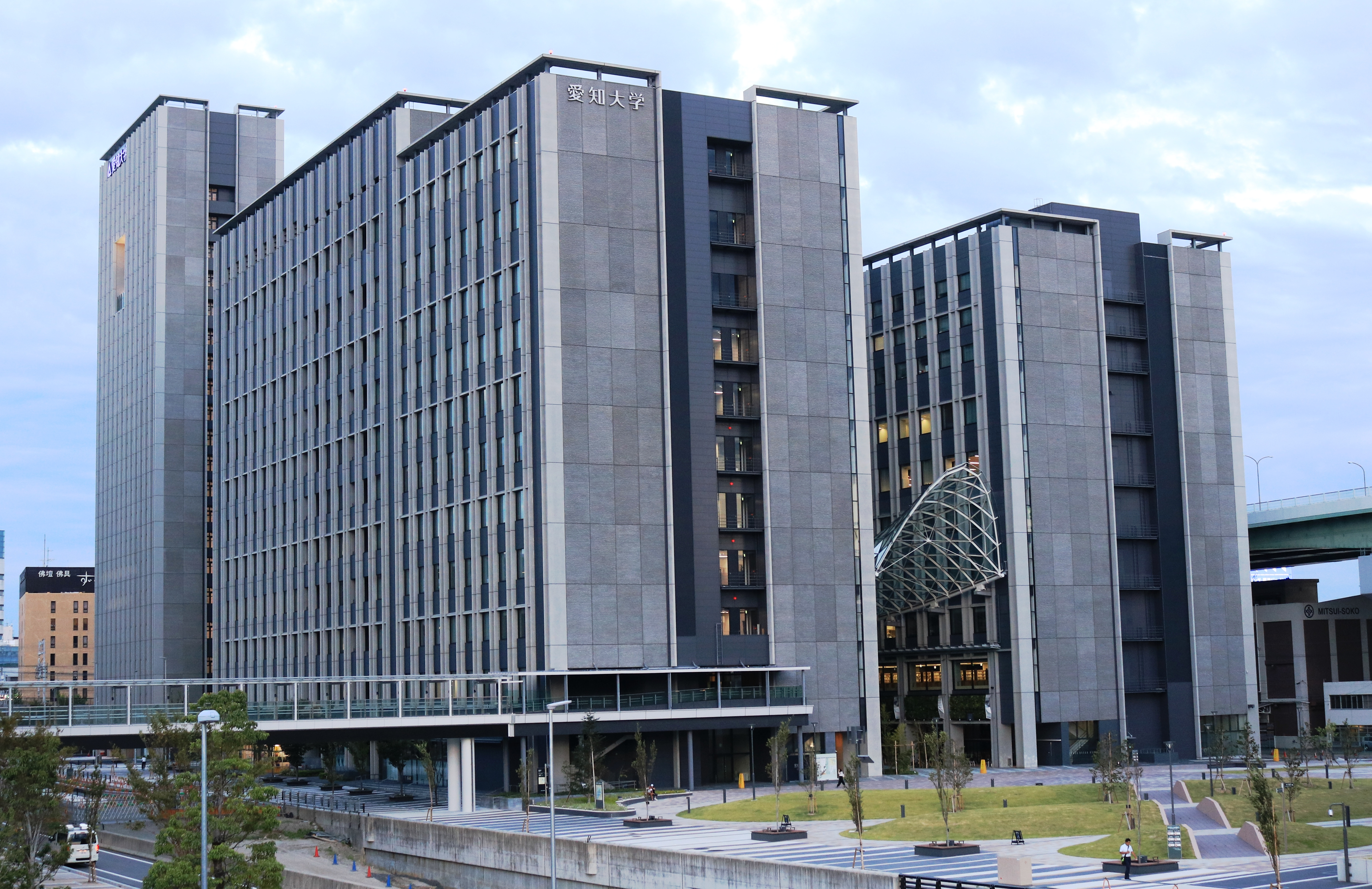
Aichi University Nagoya campus

There are 3 universities in the ward.

- Aichi University Nagoya campus
- Doho University
- Nagoya College of Music

The ward also has a North Korean primary school, Nagoya Korean Elementary School & Kindergarten (名古屋朝鮮初級学校).

== People ==
Famous people born in Nakamura Ward include:

- Toyotomi Hideyoshi, Samurai
- Katō Kiyomasa, Samurai
- Shoichi Kondo, politician
- Kiyoseumi Takayuki, Sumo wrestler
- Hiroshi Tamaki, actor
- Mariya Yamada, actress

== Gallery ==
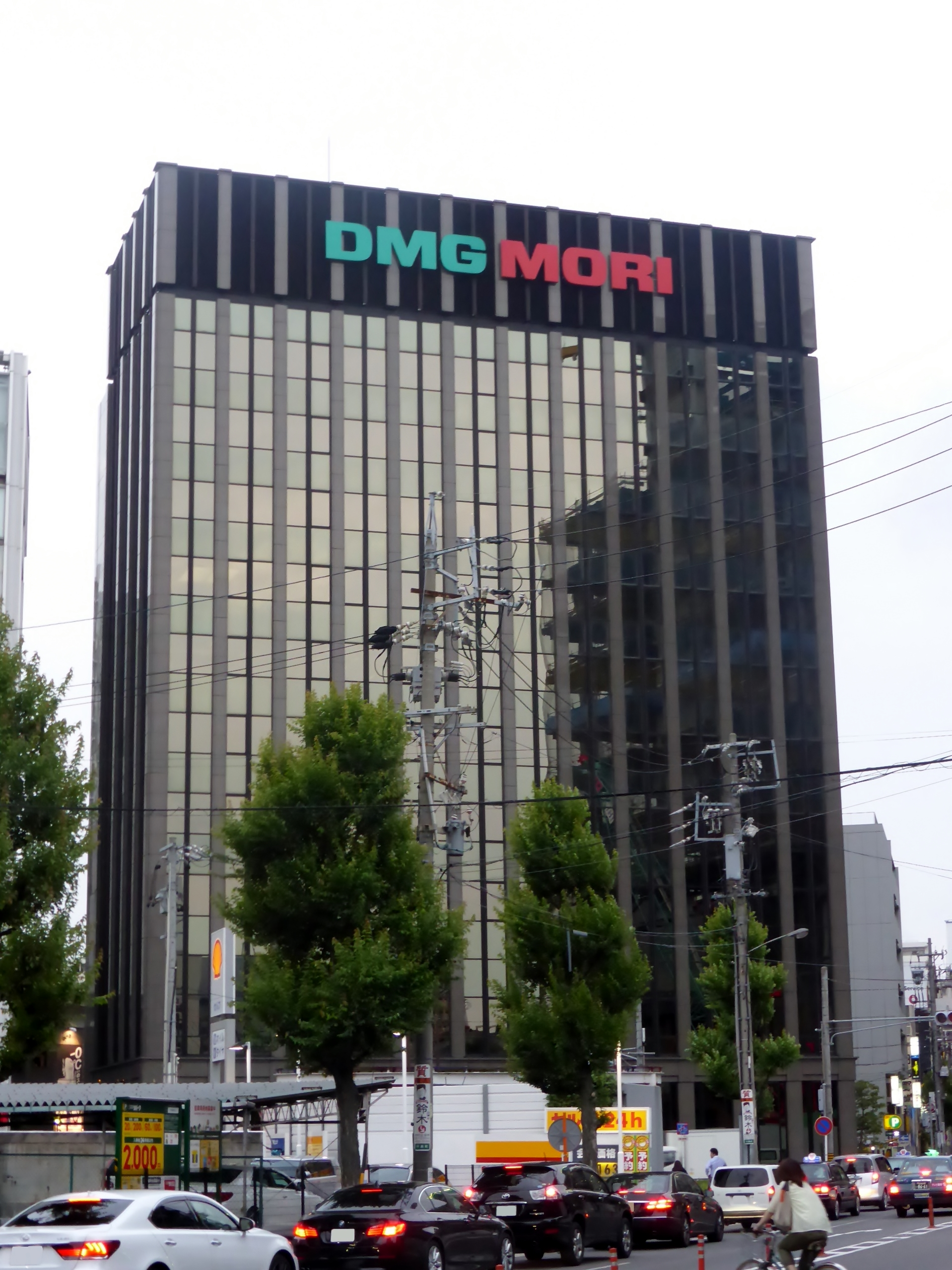
DMG Mori Seiki Co. headquarters

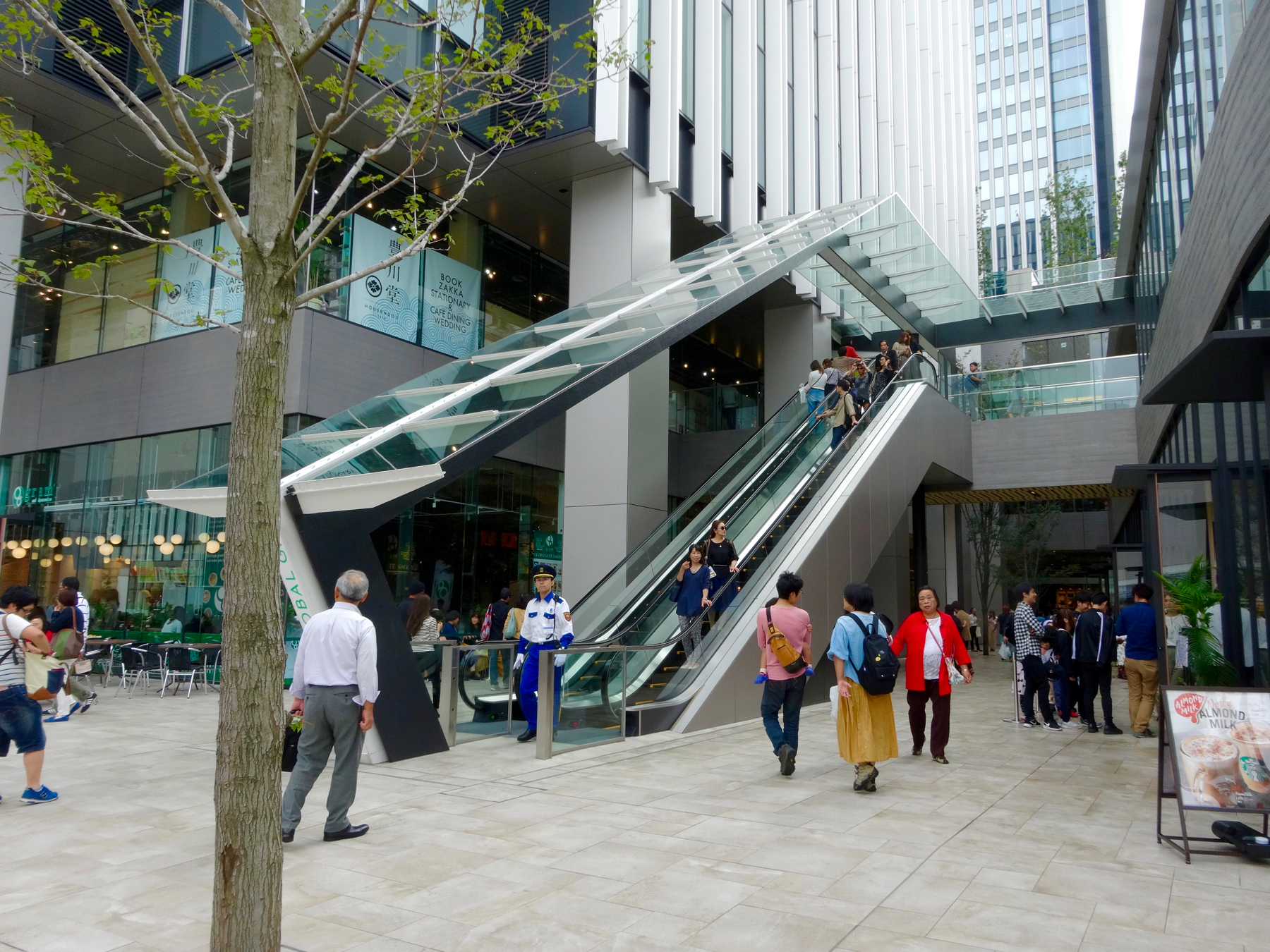
Global Gate

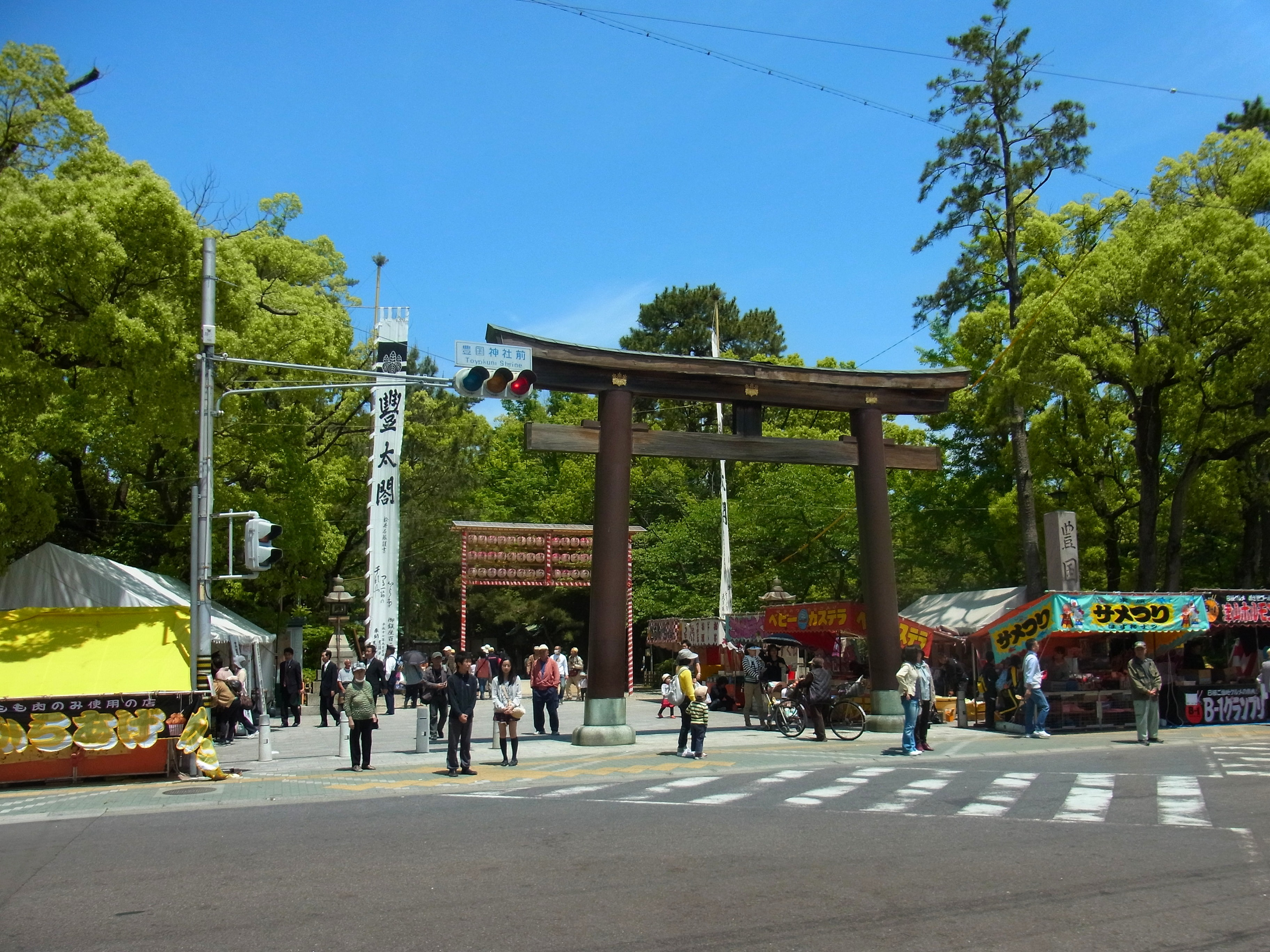
Toyokuni Shrine (Nakamura Park)
