= Aichi University =

University in Aichi Prefecture, Japan

Coordinates: 34°44′25″N 137°23′12″E

- 愛知大学
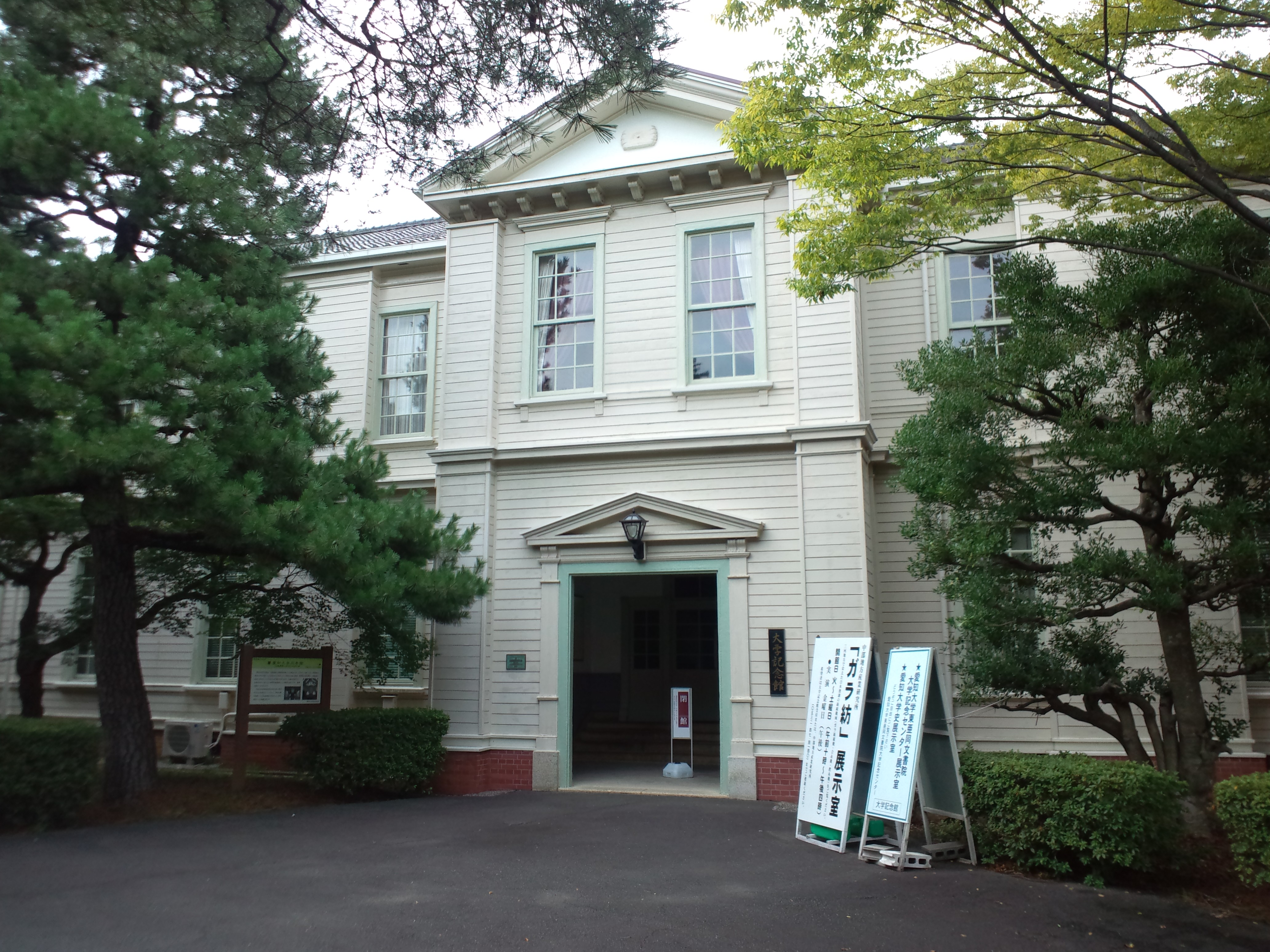
- Memorial Hall (formerly the main building)
- Other name: あいだい (aidai)
- Type: Private
- Established: 1901
- Academic staff: 281 (2012)
- Administrative staff: 148 (2012)
- Undergraduates: 9,612 (2012)
- Postgraduates: 56 (2012)
- Doctoral students: 34 (2012)
- Other students: 106 (2012)
- Location: Nagoya and Toyohashi, Aichi, Japan
- Campus: Urban
- Colors: Navy
- Website: www.aichi-u.ac.jp/foreign/english/index.html

Aichi University (愛知大学, Aichi Daigaku) is a private university in Aichi Prefecture, Japan. Its campuses are located in Nakamura-ku, Nagoya, Toyohashi and Higashi-ku, Nagoya.

== History ==
The university's predecessor was founded by Konoe Atsumaro as an overseas Japanese institution of higher education in the Hong Qiao (虹桥) District of Shanghai in 1901, and was chartered as Toa Dobunshoin University (東亜同文書院大学, Tōa dōbunshoin daigaku) in 1939. The school produced numerous leaders who took part in China's modernisation process in the early 20th century, with financial and intellectual support from Japan.

At the end of World War II, the university faced closure. Its spiritual successor, Aichi University, was established by staff and students who had previously been based at the university and other overseas Japanese institutions in Toyohashi, Japan in 1946.

== Chronology ==
- 1901: Toa Dobunshoin is established in Shanghai, China by Konoe Atsumaro.
- 1939: Toa Dobunshoin is promoted to university status.
- 1945: Toa Dobunshoin University closes in the wake of Japan's defeat in World War II.
- 1946: Aichi University is established as an old-style university by teaching staff and students of the now defunct Toa Dobunshoin University.
- 1947: Toyohashi campus opens. Faculty of Law and Economics is established.
- 1949: Chartered as a new-style university. Faculty of Letters is established.
- 1951: Kurumamichi campus opens. Community Research Institute is established at the Toyohashi campus.
- 1959: Women's Junior College is established.
- 1968: First edition of Aichi University's "Comprehensive Chinese-Japanese Dictionary" is published, the first ever comprehensive Chinese-Japanese dictionary.
- 1988: Miyoshi, Aichi campus opens.
- 1989: The Faculty of Economics and Law is reorganized. The Faculty of Law, Faculty of Economics and Faculty of Business Administration are established in its place.
- 1997: Faculty of Modern Chinese Studies is established.
- 1998: Faculty of International Communication is established.
- 2004: Kurumamichi campus is rebuilt. Graduate School of Law is established.
- 2006: Confucius Institute is established at Aichi University. Graduate School of Accounting is established.
- 2011: Faculty of Regional Policy is established.
- 2012: Nagoya campus is opened in the Sasashima Live 24 District by Nagoya Station. Miyoshi, Aichi campus closes. University headquarters and Graduate School moved to Kurumamichi campus.

== Campus ==
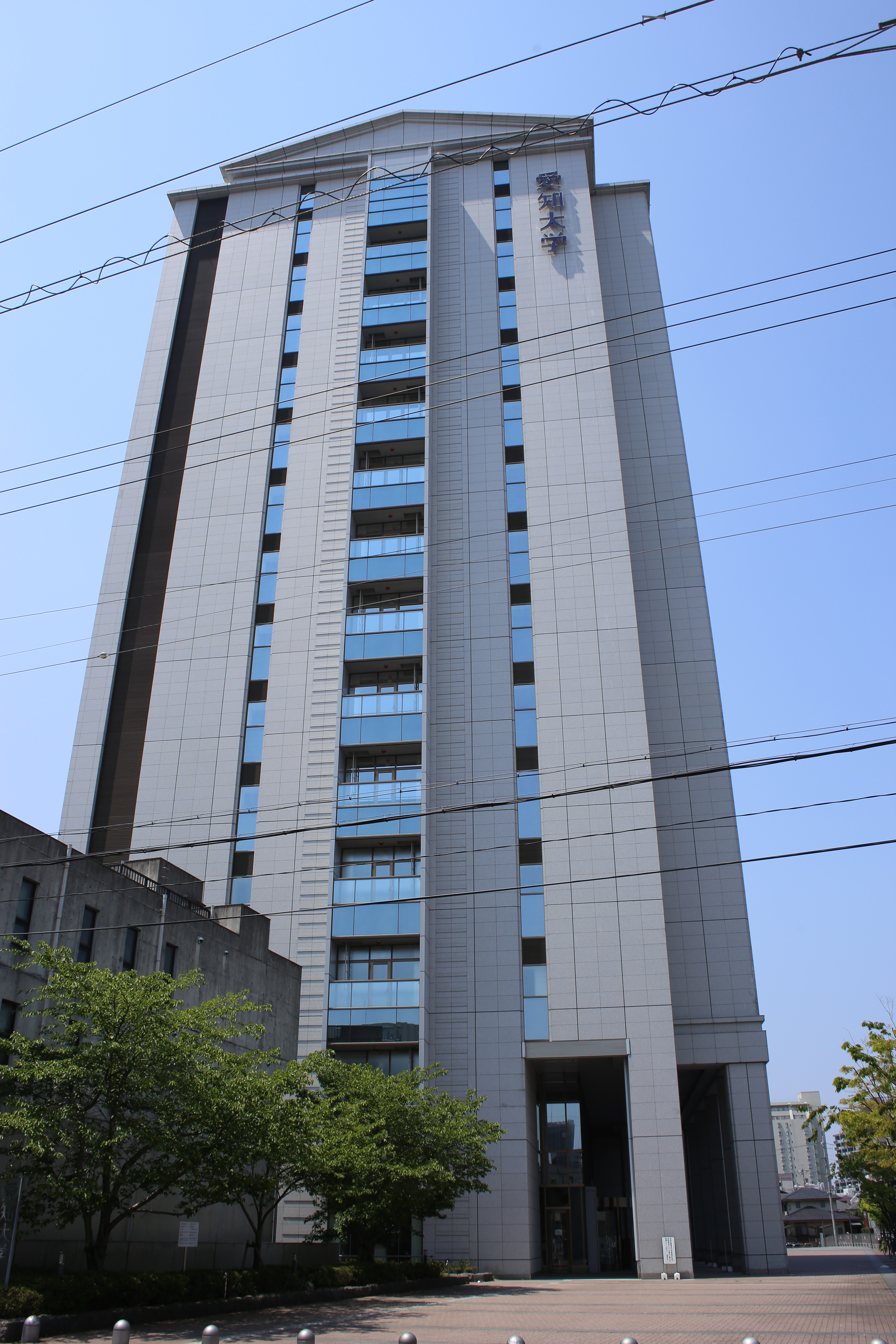
Kurumamichi Campus（University headquarters）

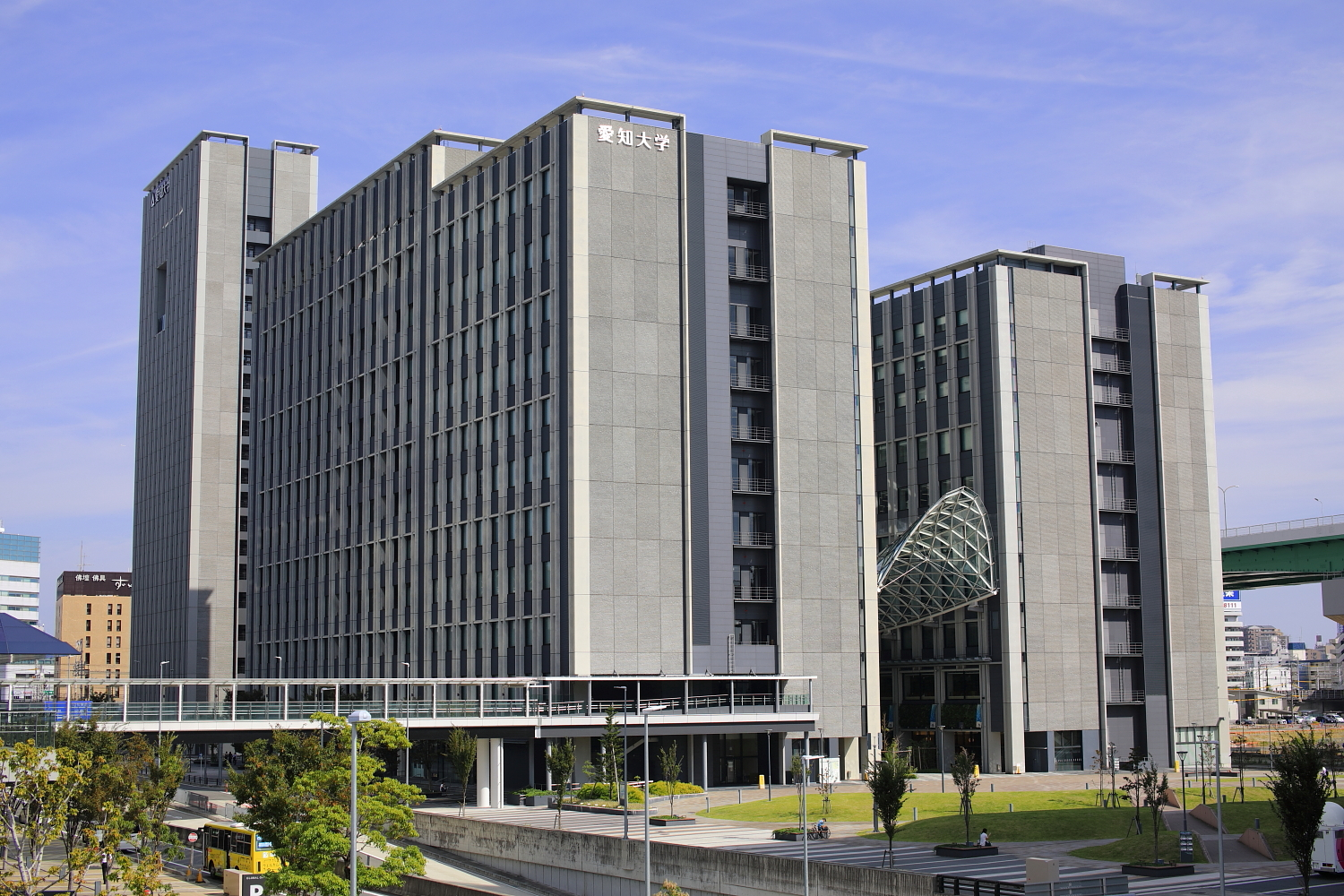
Nagoya Campus

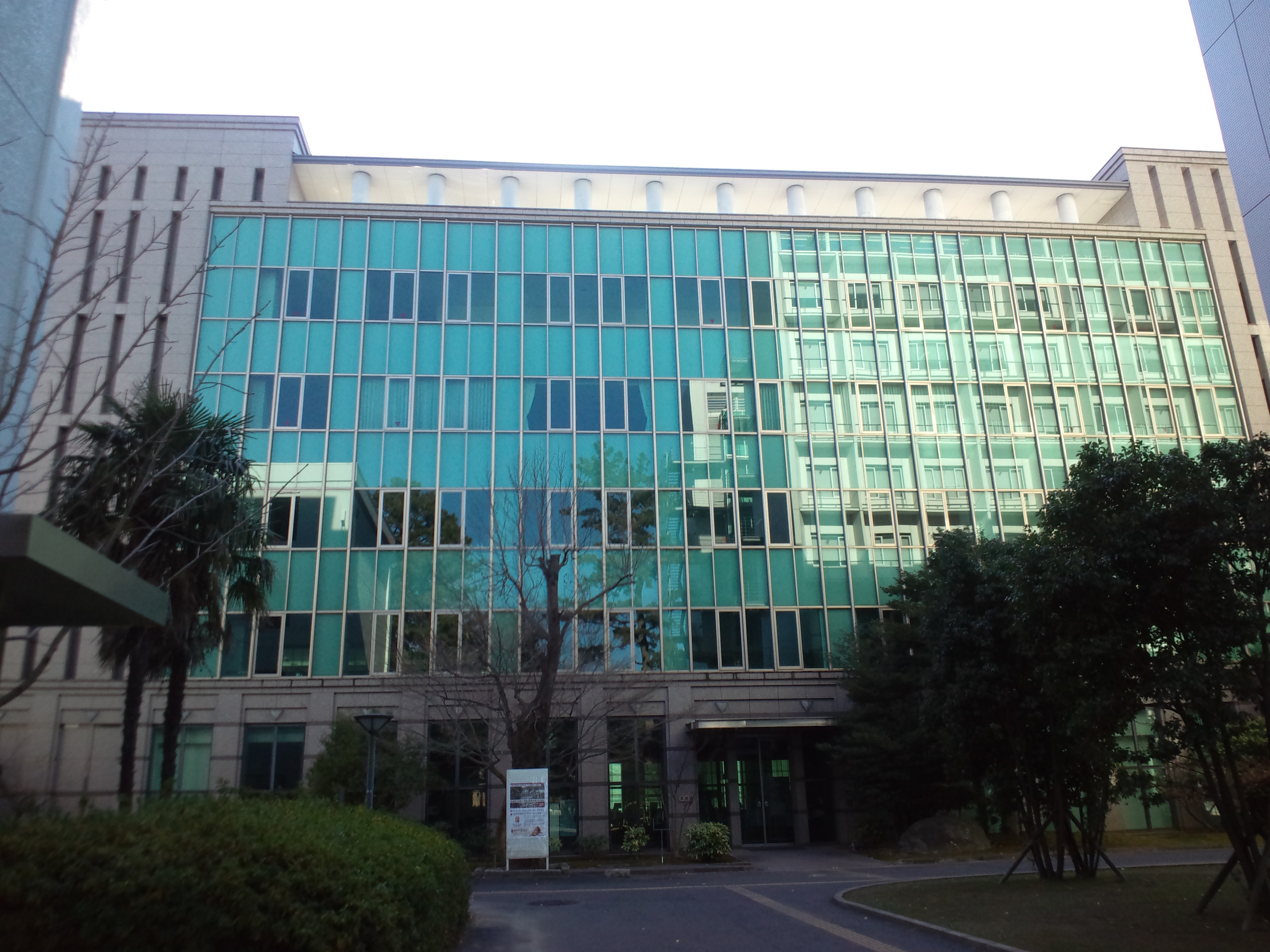
Toyohashi Campus

== Organization ==
=== Undergraduate programs ===
- Faculty of Law (Department of Law)
- Faculty of Economics (Department of Economics)
- Faculty of Business Administration (Department of Business Administration; Department of Accounting and Finance)
- Faculty of Modern Chinese Studies (Department of Modern Chinese Studies)
- Faculty of International Communication (Department of English Studies; Department of Comparative Culture)
- Faculty of Letters (Department of Humanities and Sociology)
- Faculty of Regional Policy (Department of Regional Policy)

=== Graduate programs ===
- Department of Law
- Department of Economics
- Department of Business Administration
- Department of Chinese Studies
- Department of International Communication
- Department of Humanities
- Graduate School of Law

=== Research centers ===
- Institute of International Affairs
- Managerial Research Institute
- Comprehensive Chinese-Japanese Dictionary Editorial Center
- International Center for Chinese Studies
- Community Research Institute
- Research Institute of Industry in Chubu District
- Toa Dobunshoin University Memorial Center
- San-En-Nanshin Center for Regional Cooperation

== Pass rate for bar exam ==
Aichi Law School (Graduate School of Law) was 8th out of all the 74 law schools in Japan according to the ratio, 64.36%, of the successful graduates who passed the bar examinations from 2007 to 2017 on average.

In 2006 and 2009, Aichi Law School became 1st out of all the private university law schools in Japan and 1st out of all the law schools in Japan regarding pass rate for bar exam in 2020 and 2021 consecutively.
