= Toyokuni Shrine (Nagoya) =

Shinto shrine in Nakamura-cho, Nagoya, Japan

Toyokuni Shrine (豊国神社, Toyokuni-jinja)
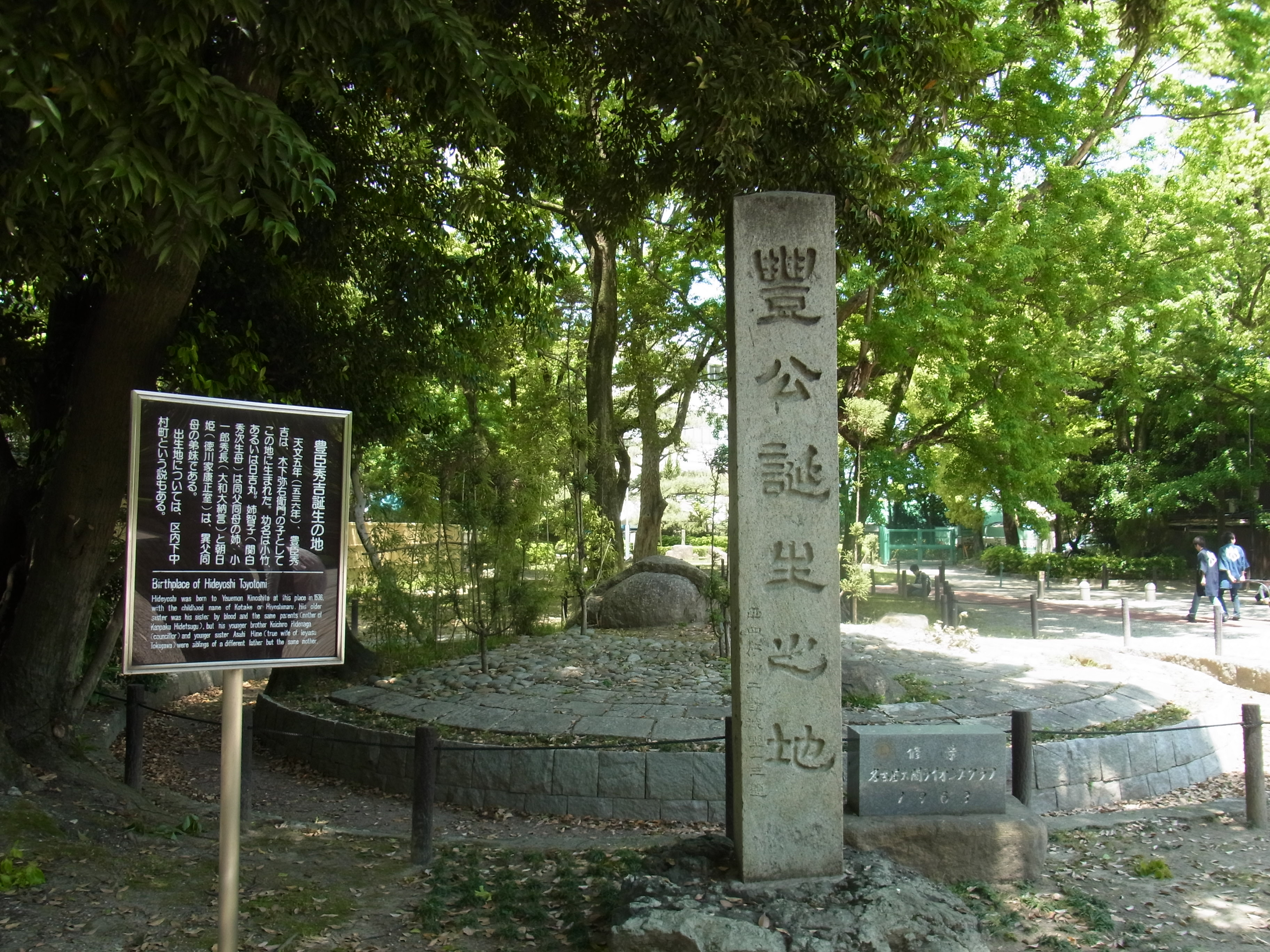
- Monument of Toyotomi Hideyoshi birthplace at the shrine

- Location within Japan

Religion
- Affiliation: Shinto
- Deity: Toyotomi Hideyoshi

Location
- Location: Nakamura-cho, Nakamura-ku, Nagoya, central Japan
- Interactive map of Toyokuni Shrine (豊国神社, Toyokuni-jinja)
- Coordinates: 35°10′27″N 136°51′16″E

Architecture
- Established: 1885

Toyokuni Shrine (豊国神社, Toyokuni-jinja) is a Shinto shrine located in Nakamura-cho, Nakamura-ku, Nagoya, central Japan. It was built to commemorate Toyotomi Hideyoshi, who hailed from the region.
