= Fukui Castle =

- 福井城
- Fukui, Fukui, Japan
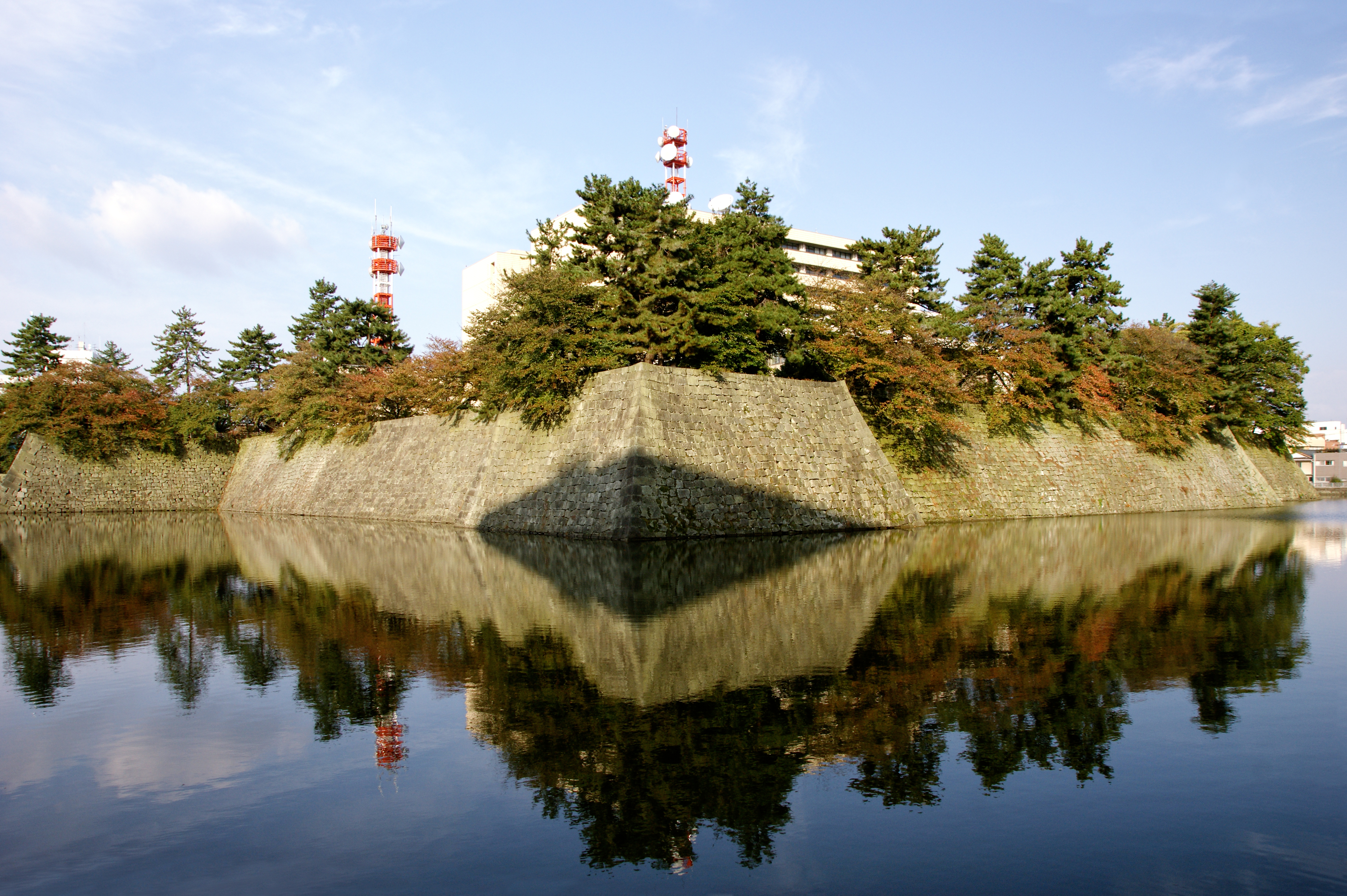
- The surviving moat and lower walls of the castle, with the Fukui prefectural office present on the site of the castle keep

Site information
- Type: flatland-style Japanese castle
- Controlled by: Shibata clan, Matsudaira clan

Location
- Location within Fukui Prefecture Location within Japan
- Coordinates: 36°03′56″N 136°13′15″E

Site history
- Built: 1573/1606
- Built by: Shibata Katsuie, Yūki Hideyasu
- In use: Sengoku period - 1889
- Materials: wood, stone
- Demolished: 1871
- Battles/wars: Battle of Shizugatake

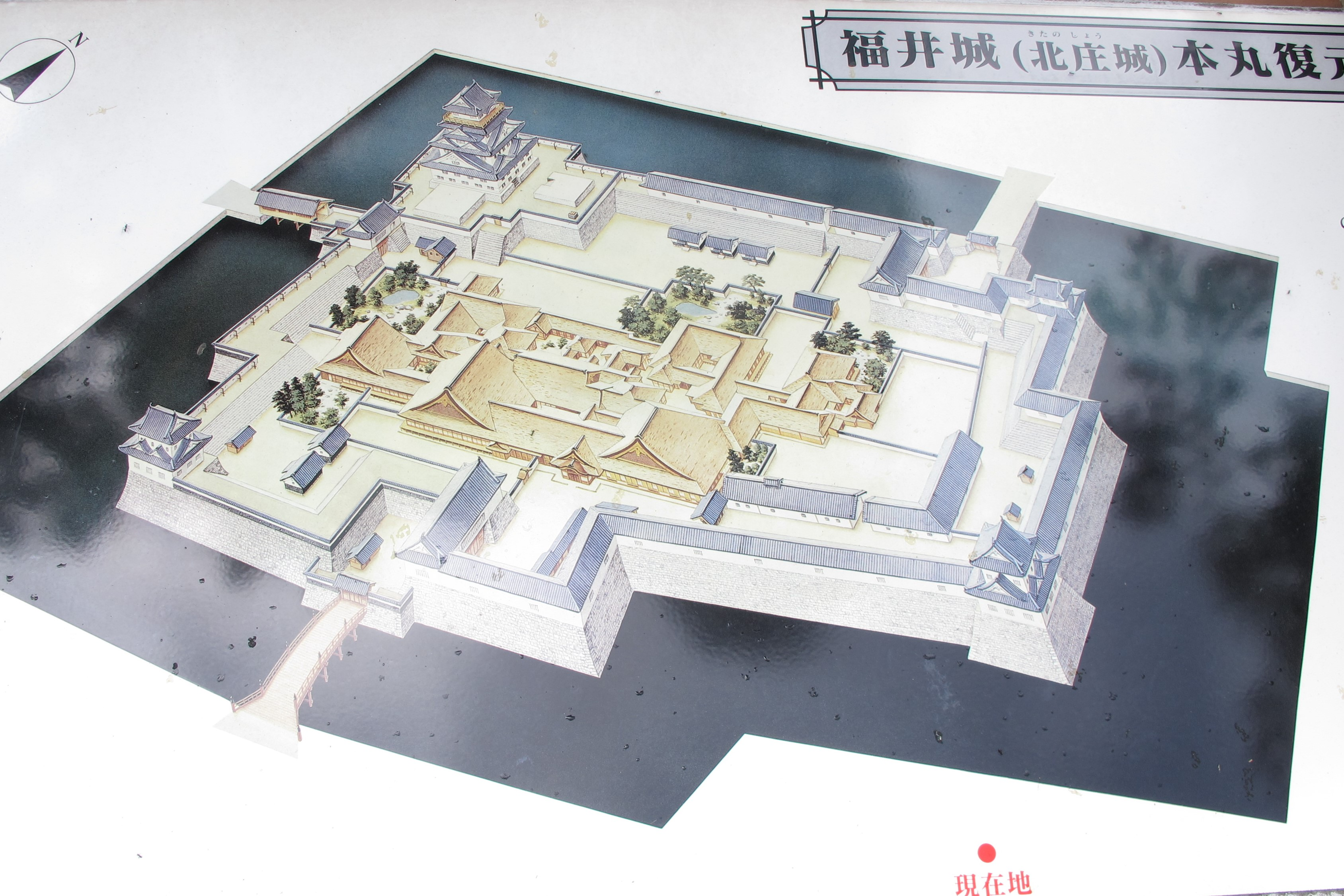
reconstruction of the central bailey

Fukui Castle (福井城, Fukui-jō) is a flatland-style castle located in what is now the city of Fukui, Fukui Prefecture, Japan. During the Edo period, it was the headquarters of a branch of the Matsudaira clan, who were hereditary daimyō of Fukui domain under the Tokugawa shogunate. The castle was also known by the name of Kitanoshō Castle (北ノ庄城, Kitanoshō-jō), after an earlier castle built by Shibata Katsuie, over whose ruins it is partly built.

== History ==
=== As Kitanoshō Castle ===
In 1573, after the Siege of Ichijōdani Castle, Oda Nobunaga placed his trusted general Shibata Katsuie in charge of Echizen Province. As the former location of the Asakura clan was in a narrow valley, he decided to relocate and to build a new castle at the juncture of the Ashimori River and Yoshiko River in the wide plains of central Echizen in 1575. As the castle lasted merely eight years, few records survive about it; however, it is known that the extensive earthen ramparts were faced with stone, and that there was a network of water moats. The inner bailey had a donjon which was nine-stories in height in its southeast corner, making it one of the largest ever built. The surrounding castle town was also laid out by Shibata Katsuie, and became the predecessor of current city of Fukui.

Shibata Katsuie was in constant conflict with neighbouring Uesugi Kenshin, and after Kenshin's death he was able to expand his territory into Kaga and Etchū Provinces. When Nobunaga was assassinated at the Honnō-ji Incident in 1582, Shibata was unable to move from Kitanoshō due to local instability, and was thus unable to prevent Toyotomi Hideyoshi from seizing power. Although he was married to Nobunaga's younger sister, Oichi, this did not prevent Hideyoshi from invading the following year. After his forces were defeated at the Battle of Shizugatake, Shibata withdrew to Kitanoshō Castle, which was subsequently destroyed in 1583. A few stone foundations of the castle were uncovered in archaeological digs and are now open to the public.

=== As Fukui Castle ===
Following the Battle of Sekigahara, the victorious Tokugawa Ieyasu awarded all of Echizen Province to his second son, Yūki Hideyasu. He began the construction of a new castle on a site overlapping the ruins of Kitanoshō Castle in 1601, with its Inner bailey (Honmaru) located slightly to the north of the former castle. Many of the stones of the former castle were reused in its construction. Surrounded by four separate water moats, the layout of the castle's Honmaru and Ni-no-maru precincts are said to have been designed by Ieyasu himself, and took six years to complete. Yūki Hideyasu was allowed to take the Matsudaira patronym in 1604. The castle was renamed "Fukui Castle" by the third daimyō of Fukui Domain, Matsudaira Tadamasa, in 1624. The name comes from a well called Fukunoi, or "good luck well", the remains of which can still be seen today. The 5-story tenshu of the castle was destroyed by fire in 1669 and was never rebuilt, leaving only its massive 37-meter high stone foundation. Following Yūki Hideyasu, 17 generations of the Matsudaira clan ruled from Fukui for 270 years until the Meiji restoration.

In 1871, all of the remaining buildings of the castle, with the exception of the daimyō palace, were destroyed and many of the moats were filled in. The area was used for the Fukui Prefectural Assembly, Fukui government offices, police station and other public buildings, including a park. In 1945, the palace was destroyed during the Bombing of Fukui during World War II. Today, the castle remains in ruins, with only some moats, ramparts and foundation stones remaining, although there is a reconstruction movement, and one covered bridge, the Orōkabashi Bridge, was restored in 2008. The castle was listed as one of the Continued Top 100 Japanese Castles in 2017.
