= Matsudaira clan =

Japanese samurai clan

Matsudaira 松平
- Mon: Maru ni Mitsuba-aoi
- Home province: Mikawa
- Parent house: Minamoto clan
- Titles: Various
- Founder: Matsudaira Chikauji
- Final ruler: Tokugawa Yoshinobu
- Current head: Iehiro Tokugawa
- Founding year: 14th century
- Dissolution: Still extant as Tokugawa clan
- Ruled until: 1873 (Abolition of the han system); 1947 (Abolition of peerages)
- Cadet branches: Various

The Matsudaira clan (松平氏, Matsudaira-shi) was a Japanese samurai clan that descended from the Minamoto clan. It originated in and took its name from Matsudaira village, in Mikawa Province (modern-day Aichi Prefecture). During the Sengoku period, the chieftain of the main line of the Matsudaira clan, Matsudaira Motoyasu became a powerful regional daimyo under Oda Nobunaga and Toyotomi Hideyoshi and changed his name to Tokugawa Ieyasu. He subsequently seized power as the first shōgun of the Tokugawa shogunate which ruled Japan during the Edo period until the Meiji Restoration of 1868. Under the Tokugawa shogunate, many cadet branches of the clan retained the Matsudaira surname, and numerous new branches were formed in the decades after Ieyasu. Some of those branches were also of daimyō status.

After the Meiji Restoration and the abolition of the han system, the Tokugawa and Matsudaira clans became part of the new kazoku nobility.

== Origins ==
The Matsudaira clan originated in Mikawa Province. Its origins are uncertain, but in the Sengoku era, the clan claimed descent from the medieval Seiwa Genji branch of the Minamoto clan. According to this claim, the founder of the Matsudaira line was Matsudaira Chikauji, who lived in the 14th century and established himself in Mikawa Province, at Matsudaira village.

=== National historic sites ===
The location of Matsudaira village is within the borders of the modern city of Toyota, Aichi. A number of locations associated with the early history of the clan were collectively designated a National Historic Site of Japan in the year 2000. These include:

1. The ruins of a Sengoku period fortified residence on the eastern bank of the Tomoe River (Asuke River) which was the birthplace of Tokugawa Ieyasu. The site is now part of a Shinto Shrine, the Matsudaira Tosho-gu, which was built in 1615, after Tokugawa Ieyasu's death and deification.
2. Matsudaira Castle, from which the Matsudaira clan ruled over a portion of Mikawa Province during the Sengoku period.
3. Ōgyū Castle, built around 1507 and used by the clan to 1575
4. Kōgetsu-in, a Buddhist temple and bodaiji for the Matsudaira clan
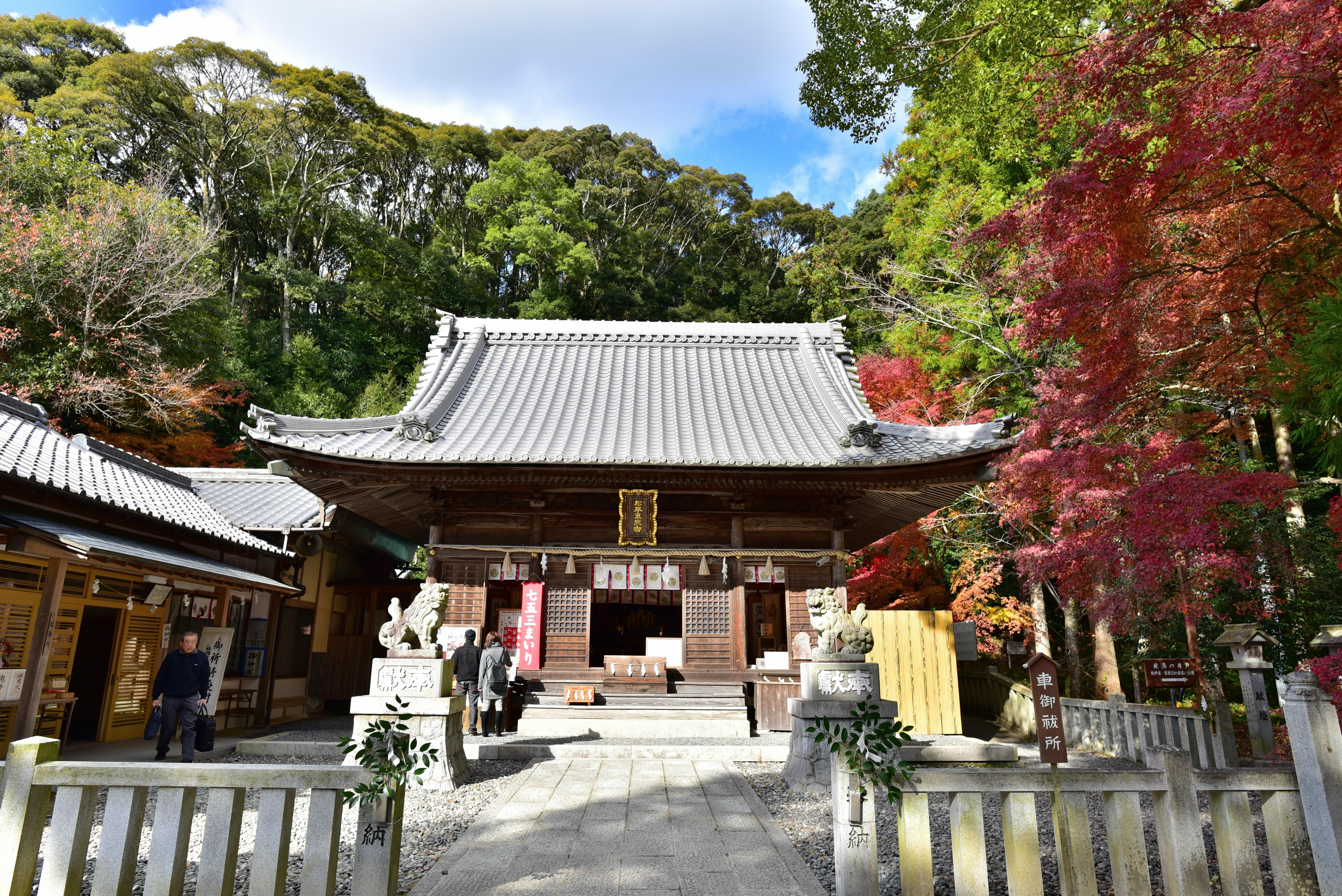
Matsudaira Tosho-gu

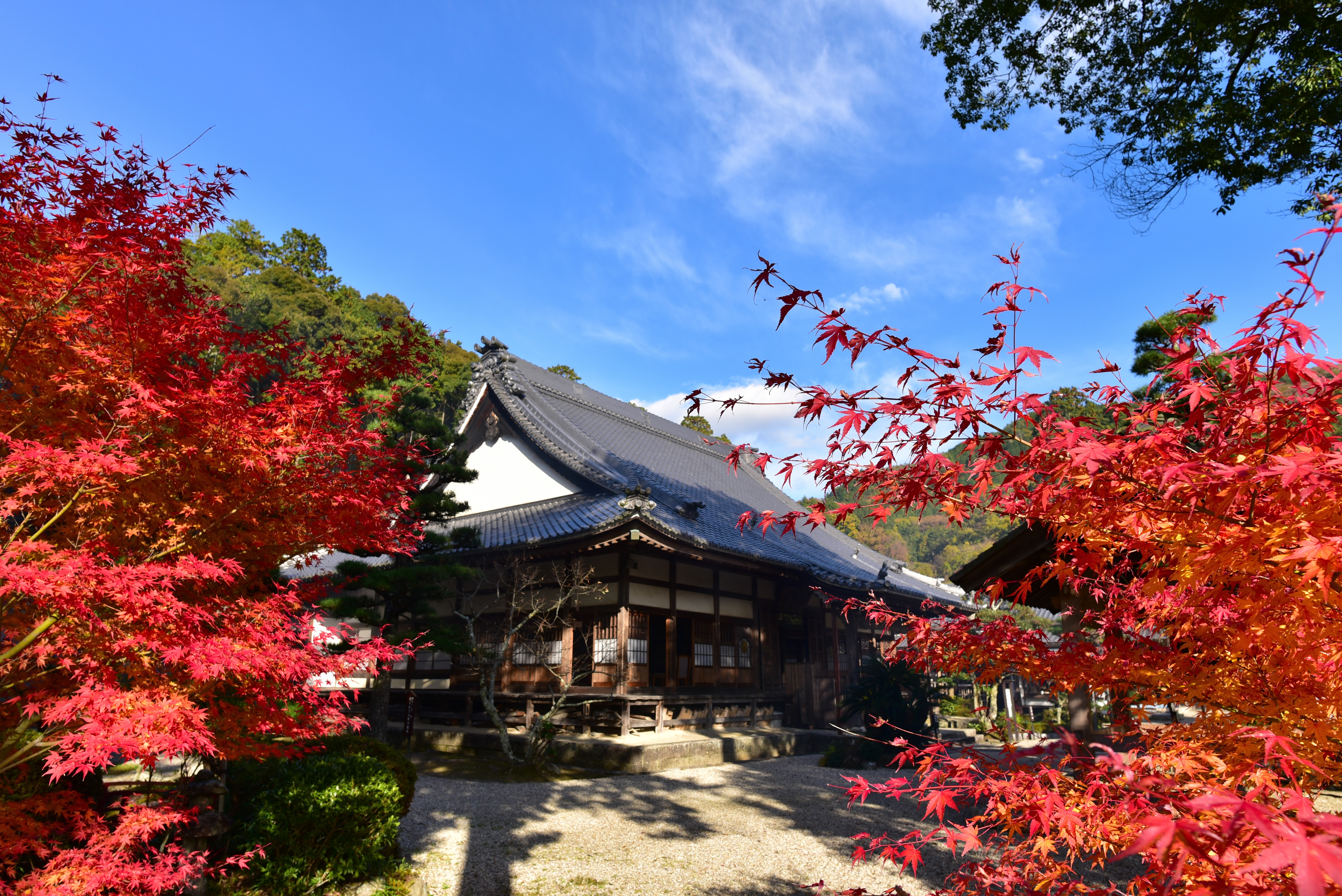
Kogetsu-in

== Sengoku period ==
=== Minor power between major neighbors ===
In its territory in Mikawa Province, the Matsudaira clan was surrounded by much more powerful neighbors. To the west was the territory of the Oda clan of Owari Province; to the east, the Imagawa clan of Suruga. Each generation of Matsudaira family head had to carefully negotiate his relationship with these neighbors.

=== Branches of the Matsudaira clan ===
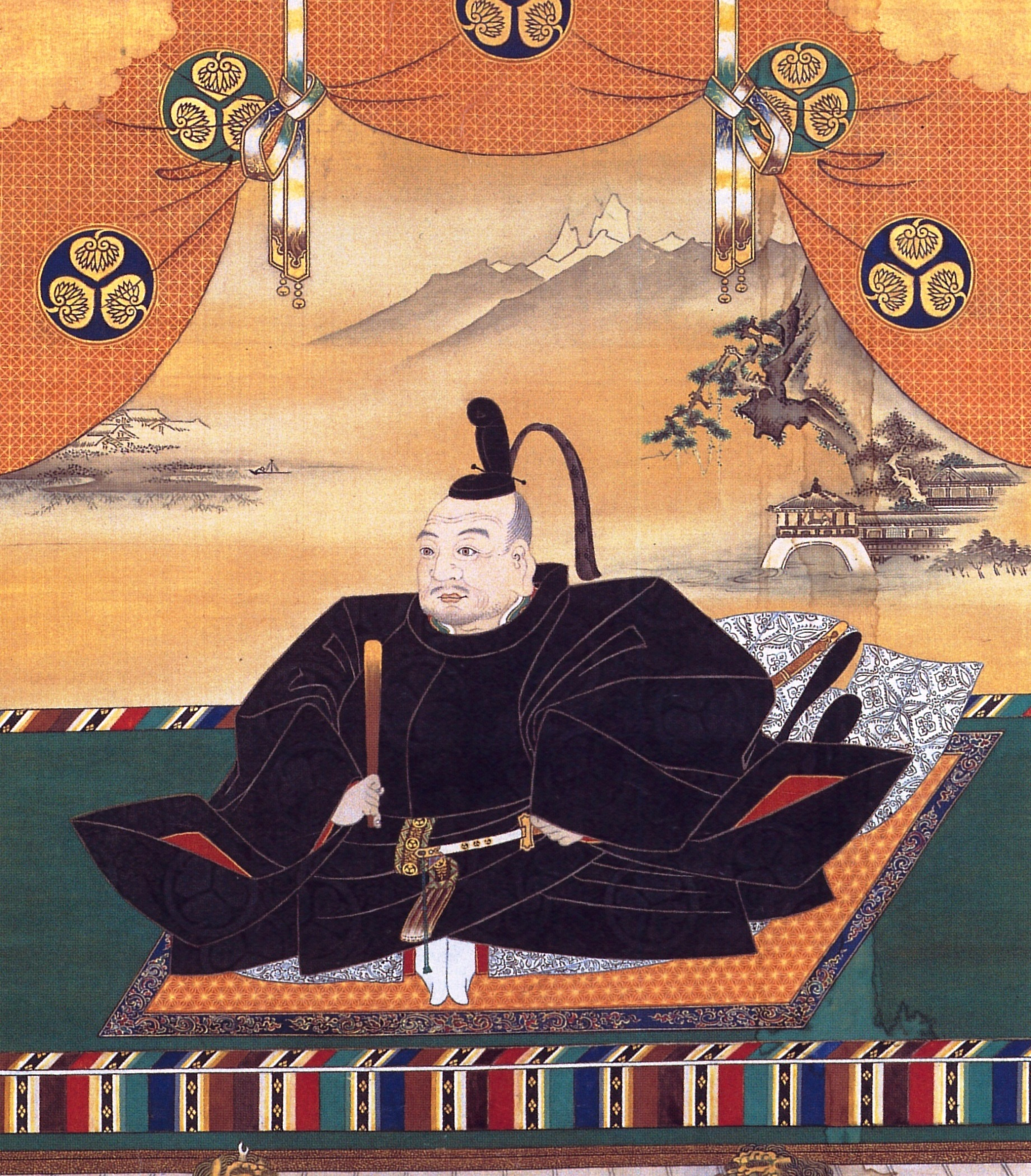
Tokugawa Ieyasu, formerly known as Matsudaira Motoyasu

Before the Edo period, there were 19 major branches of the Matsudaira clan: Takenoya (竹谷), Katanohara (形原), Ōgusa (大草), Nagasawa (長沢), Nōmi (能見), Goi (五井), Fukōzu (深溝), Ogyū (大給), Takiwaki (滝脇), Fukama (福釜), Sakurai (桜井), Tōjō (東条), Fujii (藤井), Mitsugi (三木), Iwatsu (岩津), Nishi-Fukama (西福釜), Yata (矢田), Udono (鵜殿), and Kaga (加賀). Each of these branches (with the exception of the Kaga-Matsudaira, which relocated to Kaga Province) took its name from the area in Mikawa where it resided. Also, many of the branches often fought with each other.

=== Matsudaira of Okazaki ===
It was the main Matsudaira line residing in Okazaki Castle which rose the highest during the Sengoku period. During the headship of Matsudaira Hirotada, it was threatened by the Oda and Imagawa clans, and for a time was forcibly brought into Imagawa service. After the death of Imagawa Yoshimoto and the fall from power of the Imagawa clan, Hirotada's son Matsudaira Motoyasu was successful in forming an alliance with Oda Nobunaga, the hegemon of Owari Province. Motoyasu is better known as Tokugawa Ieyasu, who became the first Tokugawa shōgun in 1603.

== Matsudaira branches and the use of the surname ==
=== Pre-Edo branches ===
Several of the pre-Edo branch families survived into the Edo period; some of them became daimyōs. The Takiwaki-Matsudaira family became daimyōs of the Ojima Domain, and from 1868 to 1871, ruled the Sakurai Domain. The Nagasawa-Matsudaira, also known as the Ōkōchi-Matsudaira, had several branches, one of them ruled the Yoshida Domain of Mikawa Province. A prominent Nagasawa-Matsudaira is the early Edo-period politician Matsudaira Nobutsuna. The Fukōzu-Matsudaira ruled the Shimabara Domain. The Sakurai-Matsudaira ruled the Amagasaki Domain. The Ogyū-Matsudaira had many branches, one of which ruled the Okutono Domain. Nagai Naoyuki was a prominent Bakumatsu-era descendant of the Ogyū-Matsudaira of Okutono. Other pre-Edo branches of the family became hatamoto.

=== Tokugawa branches and the Matsudaira surname ===
The Tokugawa surname was not granted to all of the sons of the shōgun or the heads of the six main Tokugawa branches. Only the inheritor received the Tokugawa name, while all of his siblings would receive the Matsudaira surname. For example, the last shōgun Tokugawa Yoshinobu was not the firstborn heir of his father (Tokugawa Nariaki of Mito). Consequently, Yoshinobu was known as Matsudaira Shichirōma during his minority. Some of these sons, particularly of the 3 main Tokugawa branches (the Gosanke), formed their own families, and received their own fiefs. These included Takamatsu, Shishido, Fuchū, and Moriyama (branches of the Mito Tokugawa); Saijō (a branch of the Kii Tokugawa); and Takasu (a branch of the Owari Tokugawa). Notable Matsudaira of these branches include Matsudaira Yoritoshi of Takamatsu, and Matsudaira Yoritaka of Fuchū. Yoritsune Matsudaira and his son Yoriaki Matsudaira, who were 20th-century composers, were descendants of the Matsudaira of Fuchū.

=== Yūki-Matsudaira clan (Echizen) ===
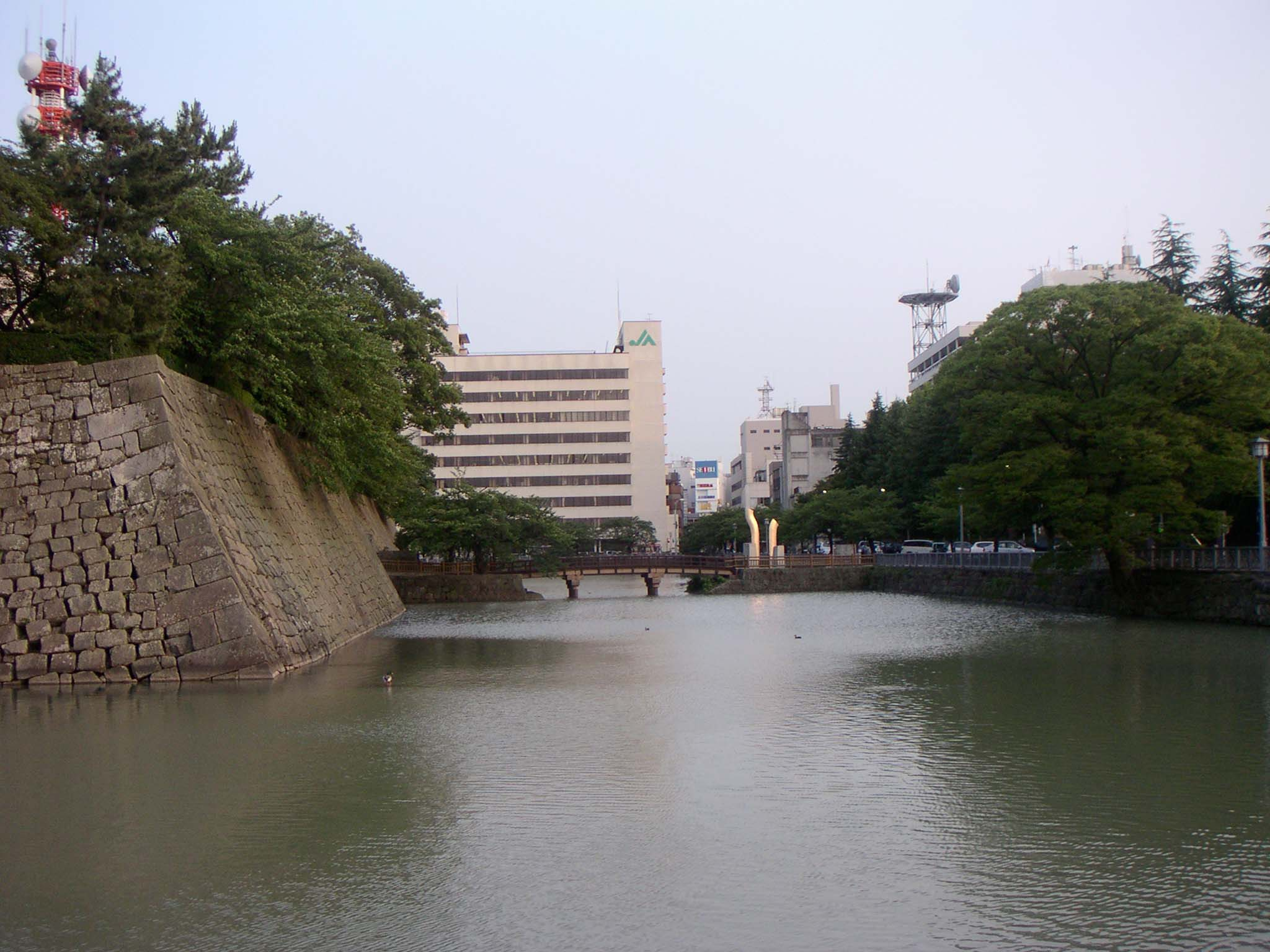
Bridge at Fukui Castle

The Yūki-Matsudaira clan was founded by Tokugawa Ieyasu's son Yūki Hideyasu. Several branches of the Yūki-Matsudaira came into existence during the Edo period. Though the Yūki-Matsudaira retained control of Kitanoshō (later renamed Fukui), the main Yūki line was not there, but in Tsuyama instead. Branches of the family ruled the Fukui, Hirose, Mori, Matsue, Tsuyama, Akashi, Itoigawa, and Maebashi domains. Famous Yūki-Matsudaira include Matsudaira Naritami and Matsudaira Yoshinaga, two daimyōs of the late Edo period. Matsudaira Yoshinaga in particular was very important to Japanese politics of the early Meiji period, and his leadership put the Fukui Domain on the side of the victors in the Boshin War (1868–69).

=== Hisamatsu-Matsudaira clan ===
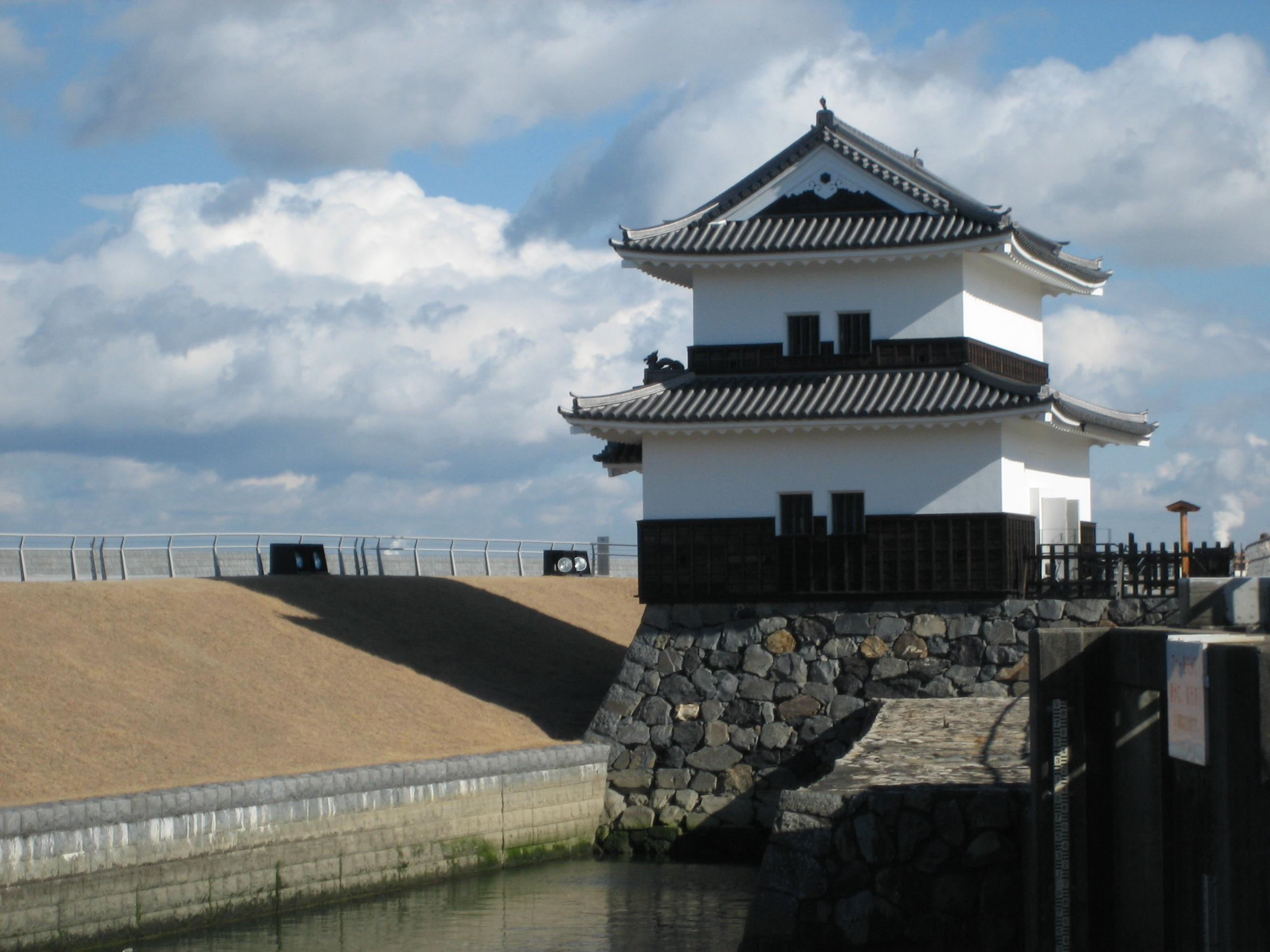
Rebuilt turret of Kuwana Castle

The Hisamatsu-Matsudaira clan was founded by Tokugawa Ieyasu's half-brother Hisamatsu Sadakatsu. Due to his close relation to Ieyasu, Sadakatsu was allowed the use of the Matsudaira surname. Eventually, some of the branches of the Hisamatsu-Matsudaira were also allowed the use of the Tokugawa family crest, as well as being formally recognized as Tokugawa relatives (shinpan), rather than simply being a fudai family. Branches of the Hisamatsu-Matsudaira ruled the Kuwana, Imabari, and Iyo-Matsuyama domains. Famous Hisamatsu-Matsudaira include the political reformer Matsudaira Sadanobu, the final Kyoto Shoshidai, Matsudaira Sadaaki, and shogunate politician Itakura Katsukiyo. In the Meiji era, the heads of all the Hisamatsu-Matsudaira branches received titles in the new nobility.

=== Ochi-Matsudaira clan ===
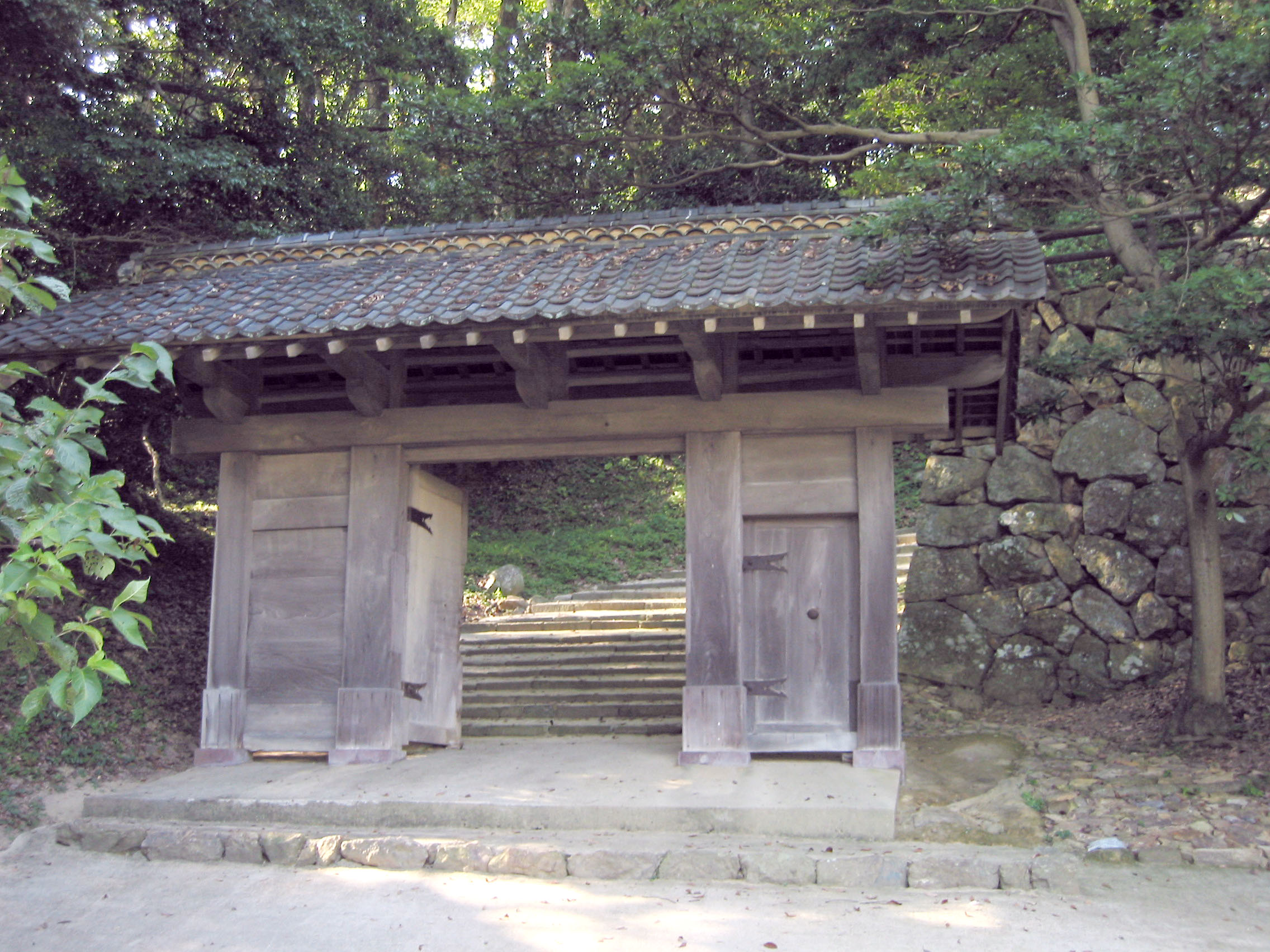
Gate of Hamada Castle

The Ochi-Matsudaira clan was founded by Matsudaira Kiyotake, the younger brother of the 6th shōgun Tokugawa Ienobu. The Ochi-Matsudaira ruled the Hamada Domain. The family lost most of its territory in 1866, when the castle town was occupied by Chōshū Domain forces under Ōmura Masujirō during the Chōshū War. Matsudaira Takeakira, the last daimyō, escaped Hamada and went to Tsuruta, one of the domain's non-contiguous territories; there he set up the Tsuruta Domain, which existed until the abolition of the domains in 1871. In the Meiji era, Takeakira's son Matsudaira (Ochi) Takenaga received the title of viscount.

=== Hoshina-Matsudaira clan (Aizu) ===
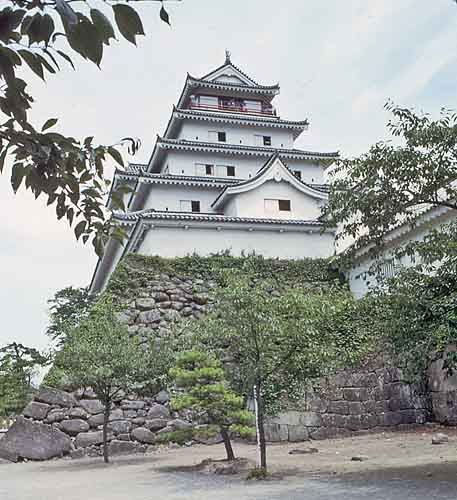
Aizu-Wakamatsu castle

The Hoshina-Matsudaira clan was founded by Hoshina Masayuki. Masayuki, a son of the second shōgun Tokugawa Hidetada, was adopted by Hoshina Masamitsu, the lord of the Takatō Domain. Masayuki was recognized as a relative of the Tokugawa family by his half-brother Tokugawa Iemitsu; after Iemitsu's death, Masayuki served as a regent for his nephew, the underaged shōgun Tokugawa Ietsuna, thus effectively running the shogunate. It was at this time that Masayuki received the fief of Aizu (with an income of 230,000 koku). Two generations later, during the reign of the 3rd lord Masakata, the family was allowed the use of the Matsudaira surname and crest. The family remained prominent in shogunate affairs and in security duty in Ezo (Hokkaido). It also sponsored several schools of martial arts, as well as working to develop and spread the production of local crafts. In the Bakumatsu period, the 8th lord Matsudaira Katataka assisted with security duties during and after the arrival of the Perry Expedition; Katataka's successor, 9th lord Matsudaira Katamori served as Kyoto Shugoshoku, but his clan was later defeated in the Boshin War. The Aizu-Matsudaira survived the Meiji Restoration, and were ennobled with the title of viscount. Katamori's son Morio Matsudaira served as an admiral in the Imperial Japanese Navy. The family survives to the present day. Isao Matsudaira, who was governor of Fukushima Prefecture in the 1980s, was a descendant of this family. Princess Chichibu Setsuko, the wife of Emperor Hirohito's brother Prince Chichibu Yasuhito, was another.

=== Matsudaira as an honorific ===
Over the course of the Edo period, the Tokugawa shogunate granted the use of the Matsudaira surname to certain families as an honorific. These families included both fudai and tozama daimyō families. The Date clan of Sendai, the Shimazu clan of Satsuma, the Mōri clan of Choshu, the Maeda clan of Kaga (and its branches at Daishōji and Toyama), the Yamanouchi clan of Tosa, the Kuroda clan of Fukuoka, the Asano clan of Hiroshima (and its branch at Hiroshima-shinden), the Nabeshima of Saga, the Ikeda of Tottori (as well as its branches of Okayama, Shikano, Wakasa, Hirafuku, as well as hatamoto-level Ikeda), and the Hachisuka of Tokushima were all tozama families that had the use of the Matsudaira surname. The Yanagisawa clan of Yamato and Honjō clan of Miyazu were two fudai families among those who had the right to use the Matsudaira surname. In addition, if a Tokugawa princess married into another family, her husband had the right to use the Matsudaira surname and the Tokugawa crest for one generation.

=== Present day ===
Prominent Matsudaira in the present day include Ryūmon Matsudaira (actor), and Iyo-Matsuyama Domain Matsudaira Hisamatsu family of branch family bannermen hits the descendants Sadatomo Matsudaira (ja; former anchor for NHK), among others.

== Key genealogies ==
=== Main line (Tokugawa shōgun) ===
- Serata Arichika
- Matsudaira Chikauji
- Matsudaira Yasuuji
- Matsudaira Nobumitsu
- Matsudaira Chikatada (1431–1501)
- Matsudaira Nagachika (1473–1544)
- Matsudaira Nobutada (1486–1531)
- Matsudaira Kiyoyasu (1511–1535)
- Matsudaira Hirotada (1526–1549)
- Tokugawa Ieyasu (1543–1616)
- Tokugawa Hidetada (1579–1632)
- Tokugawa Iemitsu (1604–1651)
- Tokugawa Ietsuna (1641–1680)
- Tokugawa Tsunayoshi (1646–1709)
- Tokugawa Ienobu (1662–1712)

- Tokugawa Ietsugu (1709–1716)
- Tokugawa Yoshimune (1684–1751)
- Tokugawa Ieshige (1712–1761)
- Tokugawa Ieharu (1737–1786)
- Tokugawa Ienari (1773–1841)
- Tokugawa Ieyoshi (1793–1853)
- Tokugawa Iesada (1824–1858)
- Tokugawa Iemochi (1846–1866)
- Tokugawa Yoshinobu (1837–1913)
- Tokugawa Iesato (1863–1940)
- Iemasa Tokugawa (1884–1963)
- Tsunenari Tokugawa (born 1940)

=== Hoshina-Matsudaira clan (Aizu) ===
- Hoshina Masayuki (1611–1673)
- Hoshina Masatsune (1647–1681)
- Matsudaira Masakata (1669–1731)
- Matsudaira Katasada (1724–1750)
- Matsudaira Katanobu (1744–1805)
- Matsudaira Kataoki (1779–1806)
- Matsudaira Katahiro (1803–1822)
- Matsudaira Katataka (1806–1852)
- Matsudaira Katamori (1836–1893)
- Matsudaira Nobunori (1855–1891)
- Matsudaira Kataharu (1869–1910)
- Morio Matsudaira (1878–1944)
- Morisada Matsudaira (1926–2011)
- Morihisa Matsudaira

=== Yūki-Matsudaira clan (Echizen) ===
- Yūki Hideyasu (1574–1607)
- Matsudaira Tadanao (1595–1650)
- Matsudaira Tadamasa (1598–1645)
- Matsudaira Mitsumichi (1636–1674)
- Matsudaira Masachika (1640–1711)
- Matsudaira Tsunamasa (1661–1699)
- Yoshinori (the former Masachika)
- Matsudaira Yoshikuni (1681–1722)
- Matsudaira Munemasa (1675–1724)
- Matsudaira Munenori (1715–1749)
- Matsudaira Shigemasa (1743–1758)
- Matsudaira Shigetomi (1748–1809)
- Matsudaira Haruyoshi (1768–1826)
- Matsudaira Naritsugu (1811–1835)
- Matsudaira Narisawa (1820–1838)

- Matsudaira Yoshinaga (1828–1890)
- Matsudaira Mochiaki (1836–1890)

=== Ochi-Matsudaira clan (Hamada) ===
- Matsudaira Kiyotake (1663–1724)
- Matsudaira Takemasa (1702–1728)
- Matsudaira Takemoto (1714–1779)
- Matsudaira Takehiro (1754–1789)
- Matsudaira Nariatsu (1783–1839)
- Matsudaira Takeoki (1827–1842)
- Matsudaira Takeshige (1825–1847)
- Matsudaira Takeakira (1842–1882)
- Matsudaira Takenaga

=== Hisamatsu-Matsudaira clan (Kuwana) ===
- Matsudaira Sadatsuna (1592–1652)
- Matsudaira Sadayoshi (1632–1657)
- Matsudaira Sadashige (1644–1717)
- Matsudaira Sadamichi (1677–1718)
- Matsudaira Sadateru (1704–1725)
- Matsudaira Sadanori (1680–1727)
- Matsudaira Sadayoshi (1709–1770)
- Matsudaira Sadakuni (1720–1790)
- Matsudaira Sadanobu (1759–1829)
- Matsudaira Sadanaga (1791–1838)
- Matsudaira Sadakazu (1812–1841)
- Matsudaira Sadamichi (1831–1859)
- Matsudaira Sadaaki (1847–1908)
- Matsudaira Sadanori (1857–1899)

=== Ogyū-Matsudaira clan (Okutono) ===
- Matsudaira Sanetsugu
- Matsudaira Noritsugu (1632–1687)
- Matsudaira Norinari (1658–1703)
- Matsudaira Norizane (1686–1716)
- Matsudaira Mitsunori (1716–1742)
- Matsudaira Noriyasu (1739–1783)
- Matsudaira Noritomo (1760–1824)
- Matsudaira Noritada (1777–1818)
- Matsudaira Noriyoshi (1791–1827)
- Matsudaira Noritoshi (1811–1854)
- Matsudaira Norikata (1839–1910)
- Matsudaira Noritake

== Gallery ==
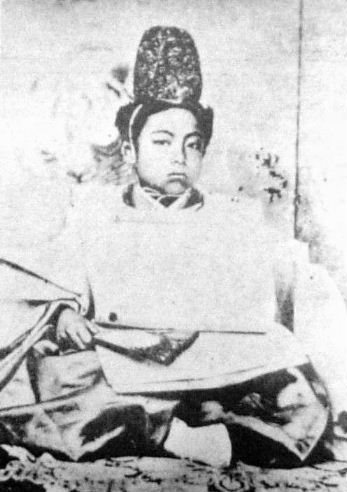
Matsudaira Shichirōma, the future Tokugawa Yoshinobu

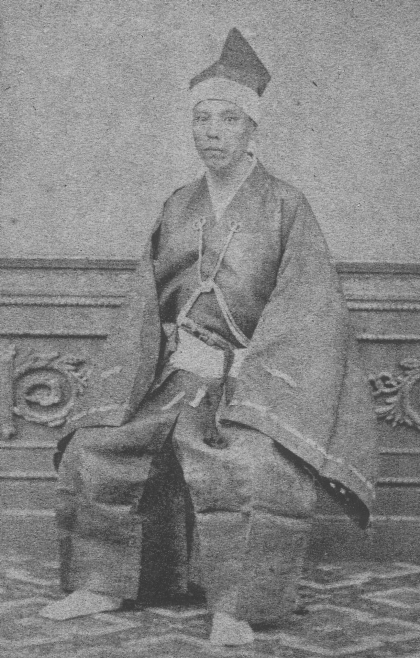
Matsudaira Mochiaki, last lord of Fukui

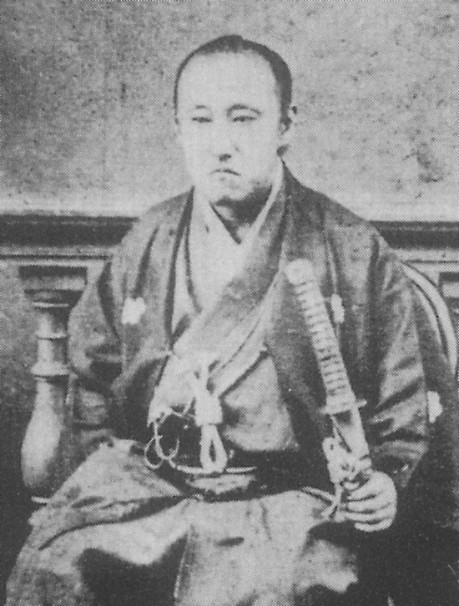
Matsudaira Sadayasu, last lord of Matsue

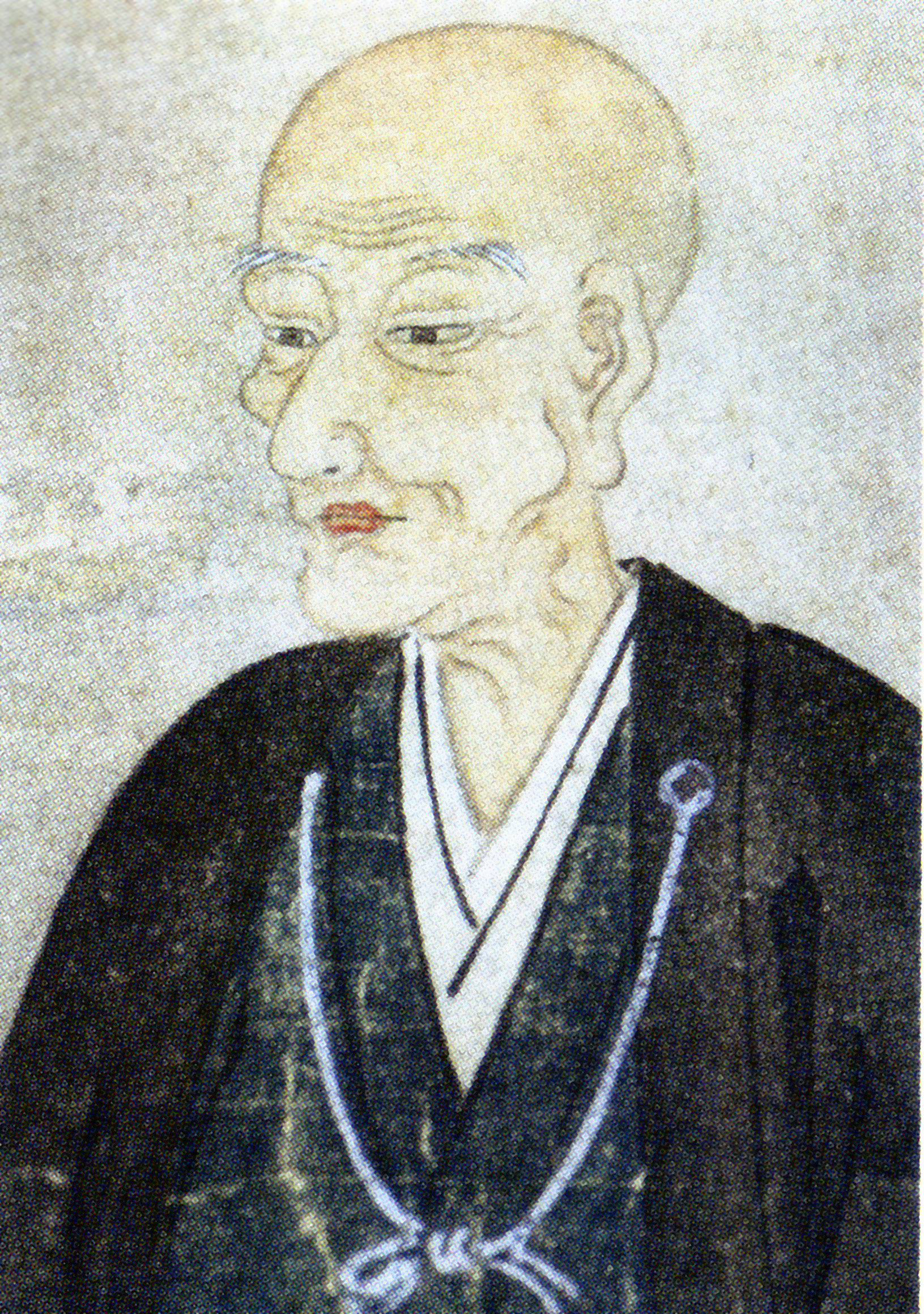
Matsudaira Harusato (Fumai), lord of Matsue, tea master
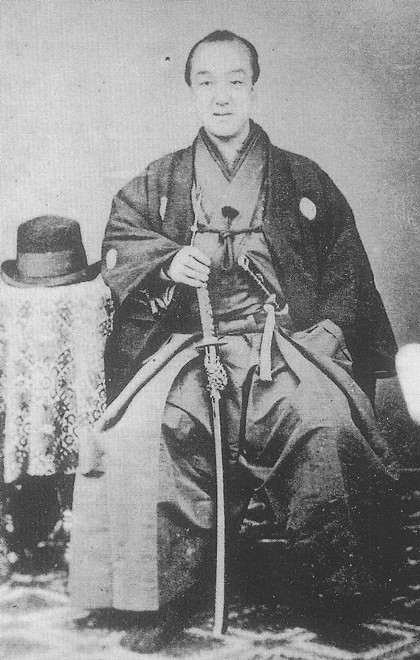
Matsudaira Yoritoshi, last lord of Takamatsu

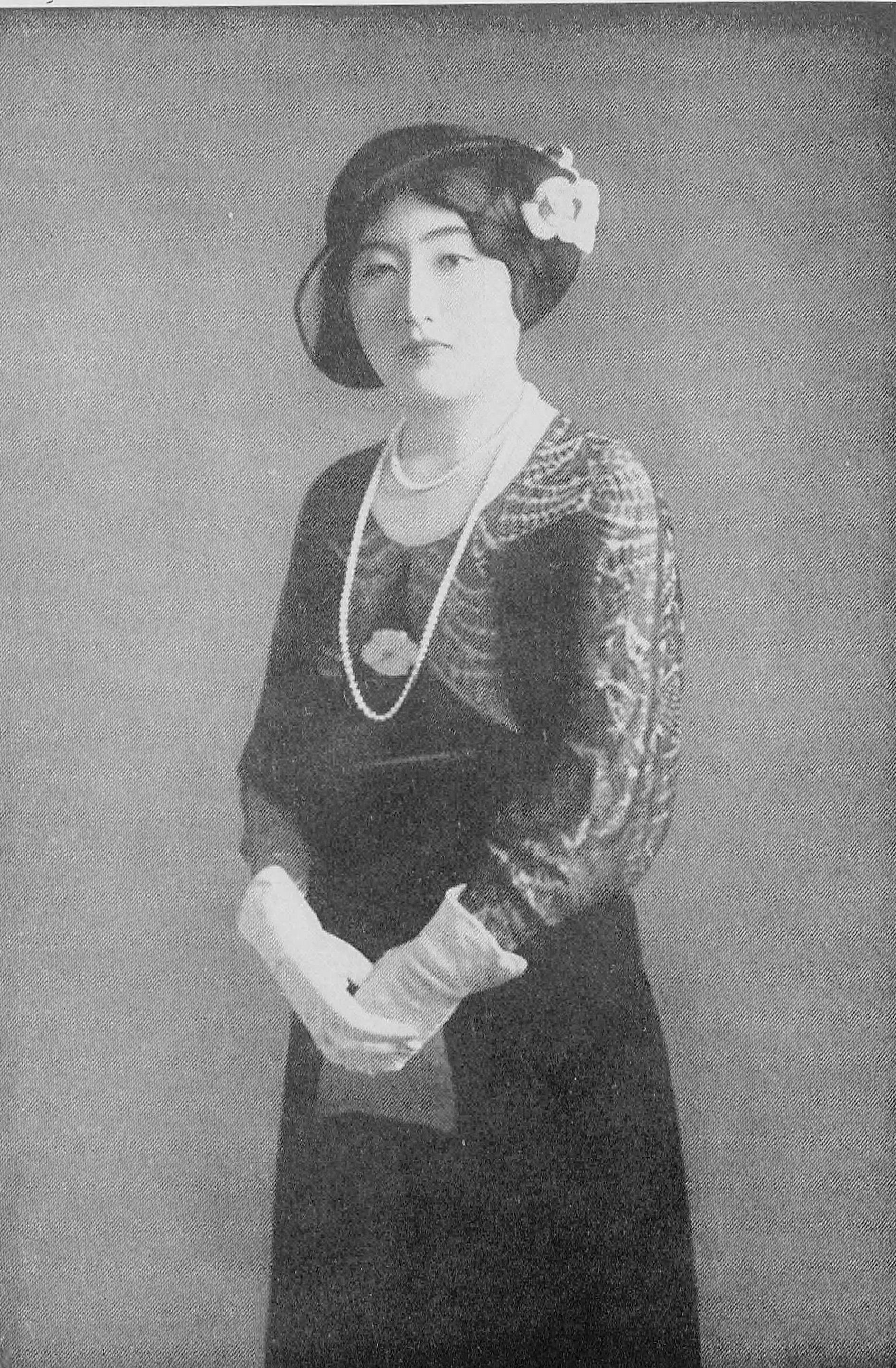
Princess Chichibu (Matsudaira) Setsuko

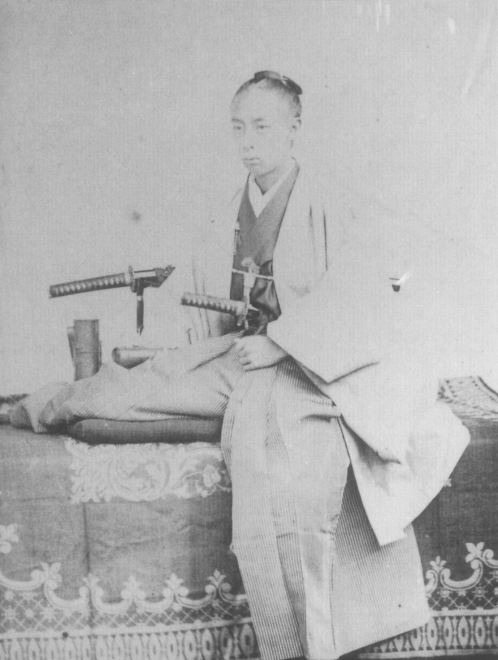
Matsudaira Tadanari, last lord of Ueda

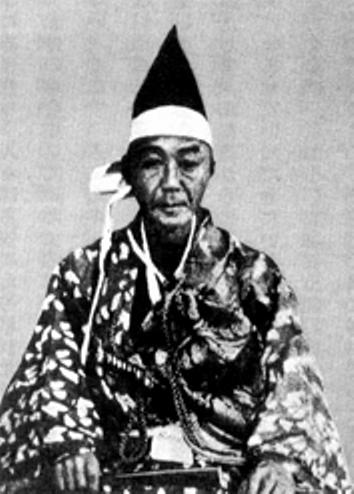
Nagai Naoyuki, the son of Okutono lord Matsudaira Noritada

== See also ==
- List of Historic Sites of Japan (Aichi)
- Tokugawa clan
- Tokugawa shogunate
- Neko-dera
