= Matsudaira Masachika =

Japanese samurai

- 松平 昌親
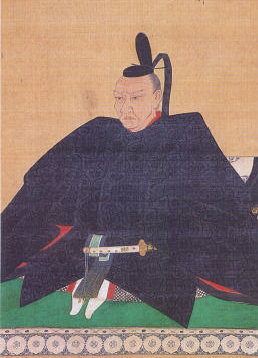
- Matsudaira Masachika
- Born: May 31, 1640; Edo, Japan
- Died: October 23, 1711 (aged 71); Fukui, Fukui, Japan
- Burial place: Fukui, Fukui, Japan
- Other names: Matsudaira Masaaki, Matsudaira Yoshinori
- Spouse: daughter of Mori Nagatsugu of Tsuyama Domain
- Father: Matsudaira Tadamasa

5th Daimyō of Fukui Domain
- In office 1674–1676
- Preceded by: Matsudaira Mitsumichi
- Succeeded by: Matsudaira Tsunamasa

7th Daimyō of Fukui Domain
- In office 1686–1710
- Preceded by: Matsudaira Tsunamasa
- Succeeded by: Matsudaira Yoshikuni

Matsudaira Masachika (松平 昌親; 31 May 1640 – 23 October 1711) was an early to mid-Edo period Japanese samurai, and both the 5th and 7th daimyō of Fukui Domain He had several names during his lifetime, and is also credited with changing the spelling of the name of "Fukui" from <福居> to <福井>.

== As Matsudaira Masaaki ==
Masachika was born in 1640 as the 5th son of Matsudaira Tadamasa. His name in infancy was Fukumatsu (福松), which was later changed to Tatsunosuke (辰之助). In 1645, when his brother Matsudaira Mitsumichi succeeded their father as daimyō of Fukui Domain, Masachika received a fief of 25,000 koku and became daimyō of the newly created Yoshie Domain. His name was changed to Matsudaira Masaaki (昌明) at that time. In 1651, he was granted the court rank was Senior Fifth Rank, Lower Grade and the courtesy title of Hyōbu-no-suke.The holdings of Yoshie Domain were scattered throughout Fukui Domain and were thus difficult to manage. Masaaki built a jin'ya in the village of Yoshie (now part of the city of Sabae) to be his headquarters; however, due to his youth, most affairs remained in the hands of his retainers. The domain built a residence in Edo in 1658. In 1664, his rank was raised to Senior Fourth Rank, Lower Grade.

== As Matsudaira Masachika ==
After Matsudaira Mitsumichi's suicide in 1674, Masaaki became daimyō of Fukui, changing his name to Matsudaira Masachika. A succession dispute immediately arose, splitting the retainers of the domain into three factions, Mitsumichi had a biological son, Matsudaira Naokata, who had been born to a concubine, but who would normally have been considered heir. However, his succession was vehemently opposed by Matsudaira Mitsunaga, daimyō of Takada Domain and the father of Mitsumichi's legitimate wife, Kunihime. Masachika also had an elder half-brother, Matsudaira Masakatsu, who was daimyō of the larger Echizen-Matsuoka Domain, and who thus had a stronger claim. However, Mitsumichi had left a written will stating that Masachika was to be heir. The issue was settled when the karō Ashida Zushō produced Mitsumichi's will and submitted it to the shogunate for its mediation. The shogunate ruled that Masachika was to be heir. At this time, Yoshi Domain was terminated, and its territory reabsorbed into the main Fukui landholdings.

However, despite this settlement, there were many in the domain who remained unhappy with Masachika's succession, and so, after only two years as lord, he resigned in favor of Masakatsu's son Tsunamasa. Masachika resumed his former name of Matsudaira Masaaki.

== As Matsudaira Yoshinori ==
Tsunamasa quickly proved to be a poor choice as daimyō. He was a cruel lord, subject to frequent fits of rage, going on rampages and even killing retainers. He also neglected his duties at Edo Castle. His retainers called on Masaaki to step back in; however, the shogunate acted first and threatened the attainder of Fukui Domain in 1686. However, as Fukui was a famed domain founded by Tokugawa Ieyasu's son Yūki Hideyasu, special consideration was given. Masachika and the domain's senior retainers were all called to Edo, and Tsunamasa was deposed. Fukui Domain was reduced by more than half, to a kokudaka of 250,000 koku, and Masachika was ordered to resume the position of daimyō. Furthermore, his courtesy titles were reduced in rank, and his seating during audiences in Edo Castle was reduced to the same room as the tozama daimyō.

Masachika struggled to recover from the damage created, and was forced to lay-off more than 2000 retainers due to the reduced size of the domain. He also promulgated several codes of laws for the domain in 1687 and 1691, to further regulate the behaviour of his officials and retainers, and to regulate shrine and temples. Echizen's famed washi paper became a domain monopoly. On the other hand, Fukui was continually beset by natural disasters, including flooding, which creating severe financial problems, which were made worse by the shogunate's ongoing punishment of Fukui by demanding that the domain assist in repairs on the stone walls of Edo Castle and by suddenly deciding to prohibit the domain from further issue of its own hansatsu

Another issue which concerned Masachika was his lack of an heir. In 1690, he had initially adopted Matsudaira Masakata, the 5th son of Mōri Tsunahiro of Chōshū Domain. Masakata's grandmother had been a daughter of Yūki Hideyasu, but there was opposition from the retainers, and so he set aside Masakata on the grounds of "poor health", and instead adopted Matsudaira Yoshikuni, Masakatsu's 6th son, as his heir in 1699. His courtesy title was elevated to Sakon'e-gon-shōjō. in 1696, and his seating during audiences was restored by the shogunate in 1702. He changed his name to Matsudaira Yoshinori in 1704.

In 1710, Yoshinori retired to a villa he constructed outside of Fukui Castle, and died the following year at the age of 72.

His grave is at the temple of Zuigan-ji in Fukui, and another grave was made at the clan's Edo temple of Kaian-ji in Shinagawa.

== Family ==
- Father: Matsudaira Tadamasa
- Mother: Uragami-dono
- Wife: Manhime, daughter of Mōri Nagatsugu of Tsuyama Domain

== Notes ==
Preceded by -none-	1st Daimyō of Yoshie; 1645–1674	Succeeded by -none-
Preceded by Matsudaira Mitsumichi	5th Daimyō of Fukui; 1674–1676	Succeeded by Matsudaira Tsunamasa
Preceded by Matsudaira Tsunamasa	7th Daimyō of Fukui; 1686–1710	Succeeded by Matsudaira Yoshikuni
