= Matsudaira Mitsumichi =

Japanese samurai

- 松平 光通
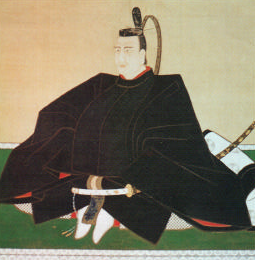
- Born: June 10, 1636; Edo, Japan
- Died: April 29, 1674 (aged 37); Fukui, Fukui, Japan
- Burial place: Fukui, Fukui, Japan
- Title: Daimyō of Fukui Domain
- Predecessor: Matsudaira Tadamasa
- Successor: Matsudaira Masachika
- Spouse: daughter of Mōri Mitsuhiro
- Father: Matsudaira Tadamasa

Matsudaira Mitsumichi (松平 光通; 10 June 1636 – 29 April 1674) was an early to mid-Edo period Japanese samurai, and the 4th daimyō of Fukui Domain.

== Biography ==
Mitsumichi was born in Edo in 1636 as the second son of Matsudaira Tadamasa. His childhood name was Manchiyomaru. He became daimyō of Fukui Domain on the death of his father in 1645. His Court rank was Senior Fourth Rank, Lower Grade and courtesy title was Chamberlain. His courtesy title was raised to Sakonoue-gon-shōshō in 1648.

The Tokugawa shogunate took advantage of his youth to further reduce Fukui Domain in size by assigning 50,000 koku to his elder half-brother Masakatsu (childhood name Senkiku) to form Echizen-Matsuoka Domain, and 25,000 koku was given to his younger half-brother, Masachika (childhood name Tatsunosuke) to form Yoshie Domain. He underwent the genpuku ceremony in 1949, taking a kanji from the name of Shōgun Tokugawa Iemitsu to become Matsudaira Mitsumichi. He was not permitted to leave Edo and visit his domain until 1653. During this period, and due to his youth, domainal affairs were overseen by senior retainers such as Honda Tomimasa, who had served the clan since the days of Yūki Hideyasu. However, as these men were all very elderly, they began dying one by one, and Mitsumichi was soon able to commence a policy of personal oversight in the domain's government.

Mitsumichi was famous as a wise lord, and enacted many legal codes which helped improve his domain's foundation and its economy, including rules for retainers on promotion of the martial arts and the maintenance of weapons. He also encouraged education, bringing in Confucian scholars from Kyoto and establishing academies. He is noted for building the large Zen temple of Daian-ji in Fukui as a mortuary temple for the Echizen-Matsudaira clan in 1658.

On the other hand, Fukui was continually beset by natural disasters, creating severe financial problems for the domain which would continue to plague it throughout its history. Mitsumichi, with permission of the shogunate, issued its own hansatsu in 1661, becoming the first domain to issue a paper currency. In 1669, Fukui Castle along with much of the surrounding castle town was destroyed in a fire, and the domain was forced to borrow 50,00 ryō from the shogunate for reconstruction. The donjon of the castle was never rebuilt due to lack of funds.

Mitsumichi was married to his cousin, Kunihime (1636-1671), the daughter of Matsudaira Mitsunaga, daimyō of Takada Domain. Kunihime was a noted waka poet, and had been sought after in marriage by the kuge nobles of Kyoto; however, there was political opposition by the shogunate, which was leery of possible collusion between the two powerful Matsudaira domains. Her marriage to Mitsumichi was delayed until 1655, when both were already 19 years old - considerably late for the marriage of the legitimate wife of a daimyō. Kunihime had two daughters (both of whom died in infancy), and although relations with Mitsumichi were apparently good, there was tremendous pressure to produce a male heir. Mitsumichi took a concubine, Lady Osan, by whom he had a son (Matsudaira Naokata) and a daughter. This created a rift between Fukui and Takada, as his father-in-law Matsudaira Mitsunaga insisted that any heir should be by the legitimate wife (i.e. his daughter). Unable to bear the pressure and uncertain that she would be able to have more children at the age of 35, Kunihime committed suicide in 1671. The shogunate bowed to Matsudaira Mitsunaga's request, and declared that Matsudaira Naokata would not be allowed to succeed to Fukui Domain and would be exiled to Ōno instead.

All of these issues caused Mitsumichi to fall into severe depression. In 1674, he turned the domain over to his brother, Matsudaira Masachika, and committed suicide. His grave is at the temple of Daian-ji in Fukui which he created, and another grave was made at the clan's Edo temple of Kaian-ji in Shinagawa in 1877.

== Family ==
- Father: Matsudaira Tadamasa
- Mother: Ichihime
- Wife: Kunihime (1636-1671) daughter of Matsudaira Mitsunaga of Takada Domain
- Concubine: Osan no Kata
- Children:
  - Matsudaira Naokata (1656-1697) by Osan
  - daughter (name unknown), by Osan, married Nabeshima Tsunashige of Saga Domain

Preceded by Matsudaira Tadamasa	4th Daimyō of Fukui; 1645–1674	Succeeded by Matsudaira Masachika
