= Matsudaira Tsunamasa =

- 松平 綱昌
- Born: June 4, 1661; Edo, Japan
- Died: March 12, 1699 (aged 37); Edo, Japan
- Title: Daimyō of Fukui Domain
- Predecessor: Matsudaira Masachika
- Successor: Matsudaira Masachika
- Spouse(s): Kiyohime, daughter of Asukai Masanao
- Father: Matsudaira Masakatsu

Matsudaira Tsunamasa (松平 綱昌; 4 June 1661 – 12 March 1699) was an early to mid-Edo period Japanese samurai, and the 6th daimyō of Fukui Domain

== Biography ==
Tsunamasa was born in Edo in 1661 as the eldest son of Matsudaira Masakatsu of Echizen-Matsuoka Domain and his mother was a daughter of Tokugawa Ieyasu's uncle, Matsudaira Sadayuki. His name in infancy was Senkiku (仙菊), later becoming Matsudaira Tsunanobu (綱宣). In 1674, when his uncle Matsudaira Masachika became daimyō of Fukui Domain, an O-Ie Sōdō erupted between followers of Masakatsu and Matsudaira Mitsumichi's illegitimate son, Naokata. Although the dispute was settled in favour of Masachika, the faction favouring Masakatsu remain vehemently opposed to his rule, and blocked any action he attempted to take. Masachika decided to retire after two years, and appointed Masakatsu's son Tsubanobu as his successor. Tsunanobu changed his name to Tsunamasa at this time. He was granted Senior Fifth Rank, Lower Grade Court rank and the courtesy title of Echizen-no-kami the same year. His courtesy title was raised to Sakon'e-gon-shōjō in 1680.

However, Tsunamasa quickly proved to be a poor choice as daimyō. He was a cruel lord, subject to frequent fits of rage, going on rampages and even killing retainers. He also neglected his duties at Edo Castle. His retainers called on Masaaki to step back in; however, the shogunate acted first and threatened the attainder of Fukui Domain in 1686 and placed Tsunamasa under house arrest on grounds of insanity and incompetence. However, as Fukui was a famed domain founded by Tokugawa Ieyasu's son Yūki Hideyasu, special consideration was given. Masachika and the domain's senior retainers were all called to Edo, and Tsunamasa was deposed. Fukui Domain was reduced by more than half, to a kokudaka of 250,000 koku, and Masachika was ordered to resume the position of daimyō.

Tsunamasa remained under house arrest in Edo until his death under unknown circumstance in 1699.

== Family ==
- Father: Matsudaira Masakatsu (1636-1693)
- Mother: Kikuhime, daughter of Hisamatsu-Matsudaira Sadayuki of Iyo-Matsuyama Domain
- Wife: Kiyohime, daughter of Asukai Masanao
- Concubine: Takemura-dono
- Children:
  - Honda Naganori (1690-1728), karō of Fukui Domain
  - daughter (name unknown), married kuge Karasuma Mitsuei

== Notes ==
Preceded by Matsudaira Masachika	6th Daimyō of Fukui; 1676–1686	Succeeded by Matsudaira Masachika
