= Takada Domain =

Feudal domain of Edo period Japan

Takada Domain 高田藩
- under Tokugawa shogunate Japan
- 1598–1871
- Capital: Takada Castle
- Area
  - Coordinates: 37°6′36″N 138°15′21″E
  - Type: Daimyō
- Historical era: Edo period
  - Established: 1598
  - Disestablished: 1871
- Today part of: part of Niigata Prefecture

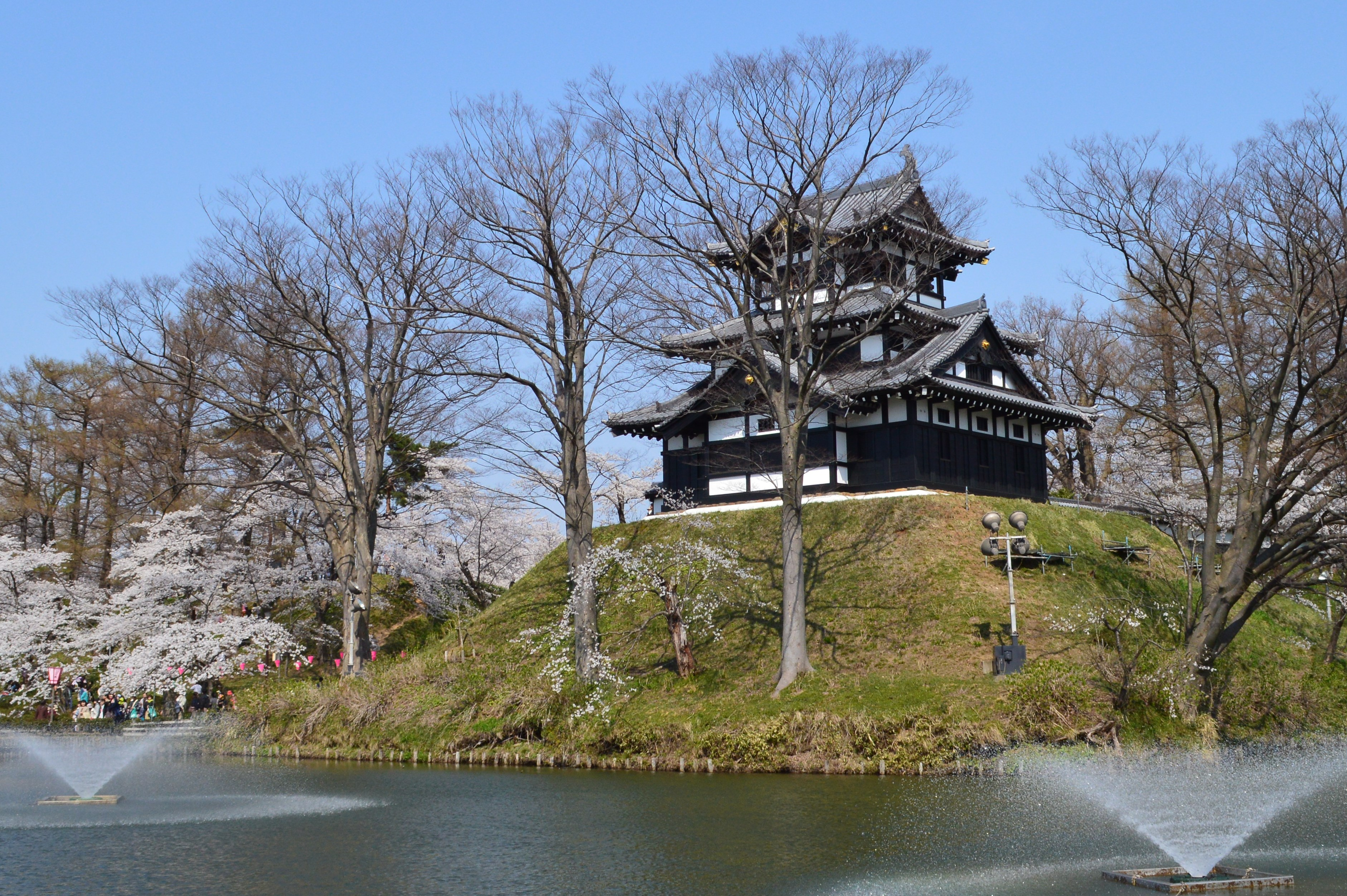
Corner Yagura of Takada Castle, the administrative centre of Takada Domain

1839 map showing Nagaoka and Takada Domains

Takada domain (高田藩, Takada han), was a feudal domain under the Tokugawa shogunate of Edo period Japan. It was located in Echigo Province, in the Hokuriku region of Honshū. The domain was centered at Takada Castle, located in what is now part of the city of Jōetsu in Niigata Prefecture. It was also known as Fukushima Domain (福嶋藩, Fukushima han).

== History ==
During the Sengoku period, the area around Takada was controlled by the Uesugi clan. After Toyotomi Hideyoshi relocated Uesugi Kagekatsu to Aizu, he assigned the area to one of his generals, Hori Hideharu, who had distinguished himself in various battles. During the Battle of Sekigahara, Hori sided with Tokugawa Ieyasu; however as Echigo Province had many supporters and former retainers of the Uesugi clan, he was ordered to remain in Echigo on guard duty. After the establishment of the Tokugawa Shogunate, his son Hori Tadatoshi faced any problems with restless peasants, religious disputes, and an internal family dispute which resulted in his dispossession and exile.

He was replaced by Matsudaira Tadateru, the 6th son of Tokugawa Ieyasu, who built Takada Castle. This also served to strengthen the position of the shogunate against the powerful tozama Maeda clan of Kanazawa Domain. However, in 1616 Matsudaira Tadateru fell from favour with Tokugawa Hidetada at the Siege of Osaka and was dispossessed. The domain was then much reduced in kokudaka and assigned to a number of fudai clans. A junior branch of the Sakai clan briefly ruled Takada from 1616 to 1618, followed by Matsudaira Tadamasa from 1619-1623. Takada was then assigned to Matsudaira Mitsunaga, from another branch of the same Echizen-Matsudaira clan, from 1618 to 1681. This gave Takada a period of much-needed stability; however, he was also dispossessed following an O-Ie Sōdō. Takada was then ruled as tenryō territory directly by the Tokugawa shogunate from 1681-1685.

Takada Domain was revived in 1685 for Inaba Masamichi, who ruled until his transfer to Sakura Domain in 1707. He was followed by Toda Tadazane, formerly of Sakura Domain, who held the post to his transfer to Utsunomiya Domain in 1710. Takada was then assigned to a junior branch of the Hisamatsu-Matsudaira clan, who ruled uneventfully from 1710 until their transfer to Shirakawa Domain in 1741.

Sakakibara Masazumi was transferred from Himeji Domain in 1741 at the age of six as punishment for issues created by his father, Sakakibara Masamine. Although the Sakakibara clan continued to rule Takada through the Meiji Restoration in 1868, it faced an early crisis with the death of Sakakibara Masazumi before his formal audience with the Shōgun. To avoid the possibility of attainder, the clan secretly substituted Masazumi with his younger brother Sakakibara Masanaga and kept the death a secret. The Sakaibara ruled Takada with relative stability though the rest of the Edo period. During the Boshin War, Sakakibara Masataka the 6th (and final) Sakakibara daimyō of Takada sided with the imperial cause, and after the Aizu War, many of the former samurai from Aizu were exiled to Takada. The head of the Sakakibara clan was ennobled with the title of viscount in the kazoku peerage system.

== Bakumatsu period holdings ==
As with most domains in the han system, Takada Domain consisted of several discontinuous territories calculated to provide the assigned kokudaka, based on periodic cadastral surveys and projected agricultural yields.

- Echigo Province
  - 614 villages in Kubiki District
- 1 village in Kariwa District
- Mutsu Province (Iwaki)
  - 23 villages in Shirakawa District
  - 12 villages in Ishikawa District
- Mutsu Province (Iwashiro)
  - 24 villages in Iwase District

== List of daimyō ==
#	Name	Tenure	Courtesy title	Court Rank	kokudaka	Notes
Hori clan (tozama) 1598-1610
1	Hori Hideharu (堀秀治)	1598-1606	Saemon-no-jō (左衛門督); Jijū (侍従)	Junior 5th Rank, Lower Grade (従五位下)	450,000 koku	
2	Hori Tadatoshi (堀忠俊)	1606–1610	-unknown-	Junior 5th Rank, Lower Grade (従五位下)	450,000 koku	dispossessed
Matsudaira clan (shimpan) 1610-1616
1	Matsudaira Tadateru (松平忠輝)	1610-1616	Sakon'e-no-Shōshō (左近衛少将)	Junior 4th Rank, Lower Grade (従四位下)	750,000 koku	dispossessed
Sakai clan (fudai) 1616-1619
1	Sakai Ietsugu (酒井家次)	1616-1618	Saemon-no-jō (左衛門督)	Junior 5th Rank, Lower Grade (従五位下)	100,000 koku	from Takasaki Domain
2	Sakai Tadakatsu (酒井忠勝)	1616-1619	Kunai-no-taifu (宮内大輔)	Junior 4th Rank, Lower Grade (従四位下)	100,000 koku	to Matsushiro Domain
Matsudaira clan (shimpan) 1618-1623
1	Matsudaira Tadamasa (松平忠昌)	1618-1623	Iyo-no-kami (伊予守)	Junior 5th Rank, Lower Grade (従五位下)	259,000 koku	to Fukui Domain
Matsudaira clan (shimpan) 1624-1681
1	Matsudaira Mitsunaga (松平光長)	1624-1681	Echigo-no-kami (越後守); Ukon'e-Gon-Chūjō (右近衛権中将)	Junior 3rd Rank (従三位)	260,000 koku	dispossessed
tenryō 1681-1685
Inaba clan (fudai) 1686-1701
1	Inaba Masamichi (稲葉正往)	1686-1701	Tango-no-kami (丹後守); Jijū (侍従)	Junior 4th Rank, Lower Grade (従四位下)	103,000 koku	to Sakura Domain
Toda clan (fudai) 1701-1710
1	Toda Tadazane (戸田忠真)	1701-1710	Yamashiro-no-kami (山城守); Jijū (侍従)	Junior 4th Rank, Lower Grade (従四位下)	68,000 koku	to Utsunomiya Domain
Hisamatsu-Matsudaira clan (fudai) 1710-1741
1	Matsudaira Sadashige (松平定重)	1710-1712	Etchū-no-kami (越中守)	Junior 5th Rank, Lower Grade (従五位下)	113,000 koku	from Kuwana Domain
2	Matsudaira Sadamichi (松平定逵)	1712-1718	Inaba-no-kami (因幡守)	Junior 5th Rank, Lower Grade (従五位下)	113,000 koku	
3	Matsudaira Sadateru (松平定輝)	1718-1725	Etchū-no-kami (越中守)	Junior 5th Rank, Lower Grade (従五位下)	113,000 koku	
4	Matsudaira Sadamori (松平定儀)	1725-1727	Etchū-no-kami (越中守)	Junior 5th Rank, Lower Grade (従五位下)	113,000 koku	
5	Matsudaira Sadayoshi (松平定賢)	1727-1741	Etchū-no-kami (越中守)	Junior 5th Rank, Lower Grade (従五位下)	113,000 koku	to Shirakawa Domain
Sakakibara clan (fudai) 1741-1871
1	Sakakibara Masazumi (榊原政純)	1741-1744	Etchū-no-kami (越中守)	Junior 5th Rank, Lower Grade (従五位下)	150,000 koku	from Himeji Domain
2	Sakakibara Masanaga (榊原政永)	1744-1789	Shikibu-no-shō (式部大輔); Jijū (侍従)	Junior 4th Rank, Lower Grade (従四位下)	150,000 koku	
3	Sakakibara Masaatsu (榊原政敦)	1789-1810	Shikibu-no-shō (式部大輔); Jijū (侍従)	Junior 4th Rank, Lower Grade (従四位下)	150,000 koku	
4	Sakakibara Masanori (榊原政令)	1810-1827	Omi-no-kami (遠江守)	Junior 4th Rank, Lower Grade (従四位下)		
5	Sakakibara Masakiyo (榊原政養)	1827-1839	Ukyō-daifu (右京大夫)	Junior 4th Rank, Lower Grade (従四位下)	150,000 koku	
6	Sakakibara Masachika (榊原政愛)	1839-1861	Shikibu-no-shō (式部大輔); Jijū (侍従)	Lower 4th (従四位下)	150,000 koku	
7	Sakakibara Masataka (榊原政敬)	1861-1871	Shikibu-no-shō (式部大輔); Jijū (侍従)	Lower 4th (従四位下)	150,000 koku	Viscount

=== Sakakibara Masazumi ===
Sakakibara Masazumi (榊原政純, December 11, 1735 – January 13, 1745) was the 4th Sakakibara daimyō of Himeji Domain, and the 1st Sakakibara daimyō of Takada, and the 9th hereditary chieftain of the Sakakibara clan. Masazumi was the eldest son of Sakakibara Masamine, and became daimyō in 1741 on the forced retirement of his father, who had angered Shōgun Tokugawa Yoshimune by flaunting sumptuary edicts, and purchasing the freedom of Takao Daiyu, a famed courtesan from a Yoshiwara brothel for a tremendous sum of money. Yoshimune further punished Masamine by ordering the transfer of the clan from Himeji to Takada, which, although it had the same nominal kokudaka, was remote and cold and had a portion of lands spread over a number of exclaves in Mutsu Province. Masazumi died at the age of 10 without having been received in formal audience by the Shōgun. This placed the domain in grave danger of attainder, as without having been formally acknowledged, the clan could not maintain the succession through a posthumous adoption. The clan therefore kept Masazumi's death a secret, and renamed his younger brother to take his place.

=== Sakakibara Masanaga ===
Sakakibara Masanaga (榊原政永, July 9, 1736 – January 26, 1808) was also the 1st Sakakibara daimyō of Takada and the 10th hereditary chieftain of the Sakakibara clan. Masanaga was the second son of Masamine and younger brother of Masazumi by the same mother. Masazumi died in 1745 at age 10 before having been received in audience by the Shōgun, so then clan kept the death secret and renamed Masanaga to take his place. He was formally received by Shōgun Tokugawa Ieshige] in 1750. His tenure was uneventful and his received promotion to Junior 4th Court Rank in 1754 and the additional courtesy title of Jijū in 1784. In 1789 he retired in favour of his son, and his courtesy title was changed to Ukyō-daifu. His wife was a daughter of Hotta Masasuke of Sakura Domain.

=== Sakakibara Masaatsu ===
Sakakibara Masaatsu (榊原政敦, September 25, 1755 – March 19, 1819) was the 2nd Sakakibara daimyō of Takada and the 10th hereditary chieftain of the Sakakibara clan. Masaatsu was the second son of Masazumi, and became daimyō on the retirement of his father in 1789. His wife was Nao, a daughter of Ikeda Munemasa of Okayama Domain. In 1810, after an uneventful tenure, he retired in favour of his eldest son.

=== Sakakibara Masanori ===
Sakakibara Masanori (榊原政令, April 26, 1776 – August 5, 1861) was the 3rd Sakakibara daimyō of Takada and the 11th hereditary chieftain of the Sakakibara clan. Masanori was the eldest son of Masaatsu, but by a concubine. He became daimyō on the retirement of his father in 1810. His wife a daughter of Nabeshima Harushige of Saga Domain. He was noted as an outstanding ruler, reforming the domain's finances, ordering all of his samurai to plant fruit trees in their gardens, improving crop yields and developing onsen. He also managed to negotiate the exchange of 50,000 koku of the domain's territories which was in remote exclaves in Mutsu Province with equivalent territories within Echigo. He retired in 1827 in favour of his son, but died in 1861 at the age of 86.

=== Sakakibara Masakiyo ===
Sakakibara Masakiyo (榊原政養, April 10, 1798 – October 11, 1846) was the 4th Sakakibara daimyō of Takada and the 12th hereditary chieftain of the Sakakibara clan. Masakiyo was the eldest son of Masanori and became daimyō on the retirement of his father in 1827. His wife a daughter of Ii Naonaka of Hikone Domain. During his tenure, his retired father continued to rule behind-the-scenes. He retired in 1839 in favour of his own son, and died in 1846 at the age of 49.

=== Sakakibara Masachika ===
Sakakibara Masachika (榊原政愛, February 5, 1814 – September 16, 1861) was the 5th Sakakibara daimyō of Takada and the 15th hereditary chieftain of the Sakakibara clan. Masachika was the fifth son of Masakiyo and became daimyō on the retirement of his father in 1839. His wife a daughter of MizunoTadakuni of Hamamatsu Domain. During his tenure, his retired grandfather continued to rule behind-the-scenes. He retired in 1839 in favour of his own son, and died in 1861 with an heir.

=== Sakakibara Masataka ===
Sakakibara Masataka (榊原政敬, February 1843 – March 7, 1927) was the 6th (and final) Sakakibara daimyō of Takada and the 16th hereditary chieftain of the Sakakibara clan. Masataka was the eldest son of Sakakibara Masanori (榊原政礼), the third son of Masanori (榊原政令) who was 3rd daimyō of Takada. On the death of Masachika without heir in 1861, he was chosen as posthumous successor. His wife was a daughter of Arima Harusumi of Maruoka Domain. In 1866, his forces accompanied the forces of Hikone Domain in the Second Chōshū expedition, but were badly outmatched by the numerically inferior but better armed Chōshū forces. At the time of the Boshin War, he initially attempted to remain neutral; however, when forces of the Satchō Alliance entered Takada, his force chased the remaining shogunate forces out, and he defected to the imperial side. The forces of Takada were called upon to attack neighbouring Nagaoka Domain and later Aizu Domain. At the end of the war, many Aizu samurai were sent as prisoners to Takada, but were treated well by a largely sympathetic populace. In 1869, he was appointed imperial governor of Takada until the abolition of the han system in 1871. He received the kazoku peerage title of shishaku (viscount) in 1884.

== See also ==
- List of Han
