= Sakai Tadakatsu (Shōnai) =

- 酒井忠勝
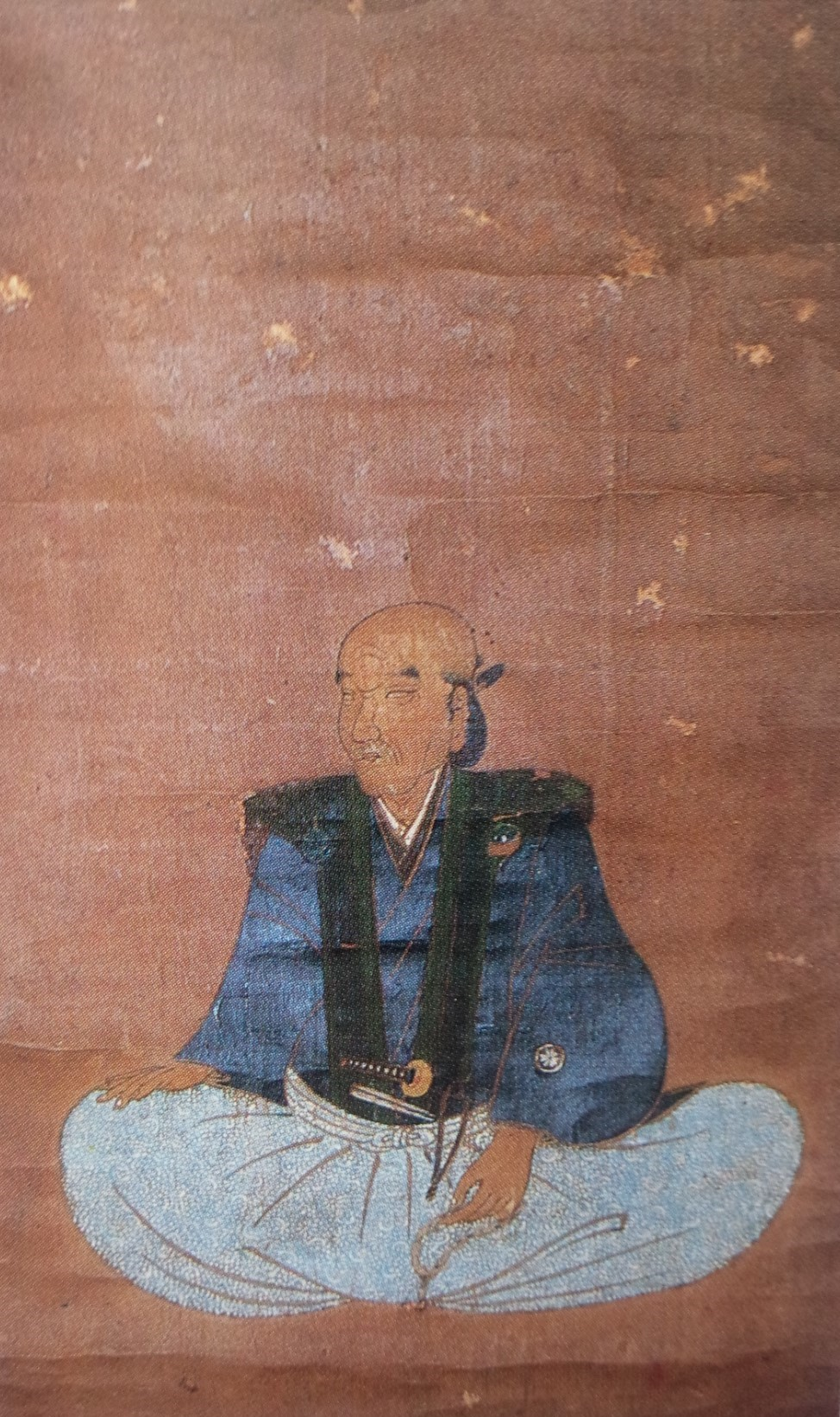
- Sakai Tadakatsu

1st Daimyō of Shōnai Domain
- In office 1622–1647
- Monarchs: Shōgun: Tokugawa Hidetada; Tokugawa Iemitsu
- Preceded by: -none-
- Succeeded by: Sakai Tadamasa

1st Daimyō of Matsushiro Domain
- In office 1619–1622
- Preceded by: Matsudaira Tadamasa
- Succeeded by: Sanada Nobuyuki

1st Daimyō of Takada Domain
- In office 1618–1619
- Preceded by: Sakai Ietsugu
- Succeeded by: Matsudaira Tadamasa

Personal details
- Born: 1594
- Died: November 13, 1647 (aged 52–53)
- Spouse: daughter of Torii Tadamasa of Iwakitaira Domain
- Parent: Sakai Ietsugu (father)

Sakai Tadakatsu (酒井忠勝, 1594 – November 13, 1647) was a Sengoku period samurai and early Edo period daimyō under the Tokugawa shogunate of Japan. His courtesy title was Kunai-no-taifu.

== Biography ==
Sakai Tadakatsu was the sixth son of Sakai Ietsugu, castellan of Yoshida Castle and son of Sakai Tadatsugu (1527–1596), who was a vassal of Tokugawa Ieyasu. Tadakatsu's childhood name was Kogōrō, and when he underwent his genpuku ceremony, he was awarded a kanji from the name of Shōgun Tokugawa Hidetada as a special mark of favor, becoming "Tadakatsu".

He became daimyō of Takada Domain in Echigo Province (100,000 koku) on the death of his father in 1618. However, only one year later, he was transferred to Matsushiro Domain in Shinano Province by order of the shogunate, with the same nominal kokudaka. Three years later, in 1622, when the shogunate dispossessed the Mogami clan, Tadakatsu was transferred again, to become daimyō of Shōnai Domain. At that time, his kokudaka was increased to 138,000 koku. One of his first actions on becoming daimyō of Shōnai was to begin the construction of Tsuruoka Castle as a replacement for the dilapidated Kamegasaki Castle. However, the completed Tsuruoka Castle was given to his grandson, Sakai Tadayoshi, and he continued to reside at the old Kamegasaki Castle after his retirement. It was unusual for a domain, especially of this size, to have two castles in violation of the shogunate's "one domain - one castle" edict, and was a mark of the high standing the Sakai clan enjoyed within the shogunate. On the other hand, funding of this castle resulted in higher taxation, which caused unrest in the domain, even to the point where petitions were sent directly to the shogunate in Edo in 1634 complaining about misgovernment.

In his final years, Tadakatsu instigated an O-Ie Sōdō by attempting to disinherit his own son, Sakai Tadamasa, in favor of his younger brother, Sakai Tadashige in 1642. This action was greatly opposed by the domain's senior advisors and karō and Tadakatsu died in 1647 before the issue was resolved. The ō Matsudaira Nobutsuna ruled in favor of Sakai Tadamasa as successor.
