= Yūki Harutomo =

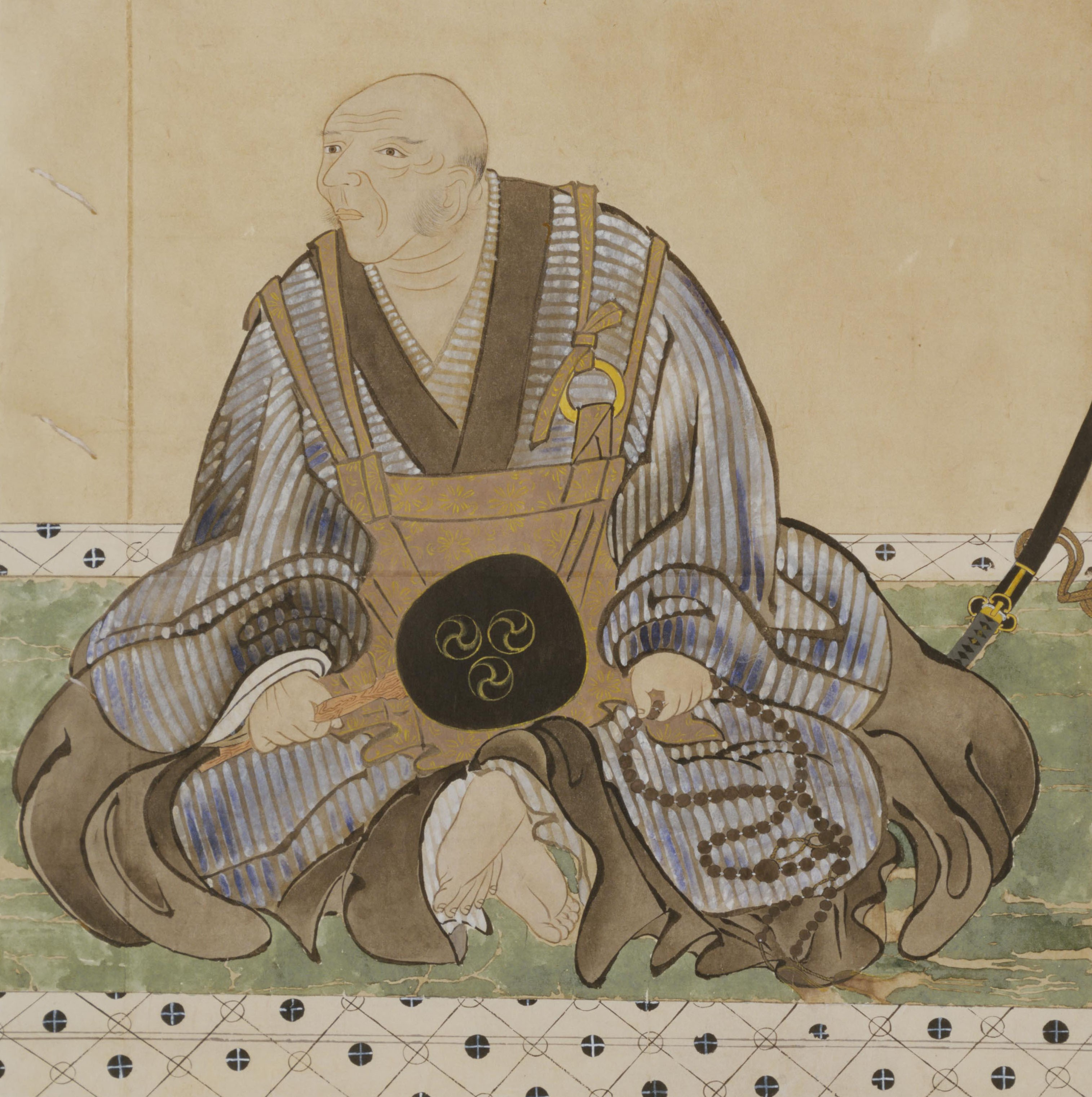

Yūki Harutomo (結城 晴朝, September 18, 1533 – August 25, 1614) was a retainer of the Japanese Hōjō clan and an early daimyō of Shimōsa Province. Harutomo was the son of Oyama Takatomo and was adopted by his uncle Yūki Masakatsu.

Harutomo ultimately accepted the authority of the Hōjō, but his ties were severed when Toyotomi Hideyoshi besieged the Hōjō castle of Odawara. Harutomo later adopted the 2nd son of the famous Tokugawa Ieyasu, Hideyasu, whom he later accompanied to the province of Echizen following the year of 1600.
