= Fukui Domain =

Domain (han) of the Tokugawa Shogunate

Fukui Domain 福井藩 Fukui-han
- Domain of Japan
- 1600–1870
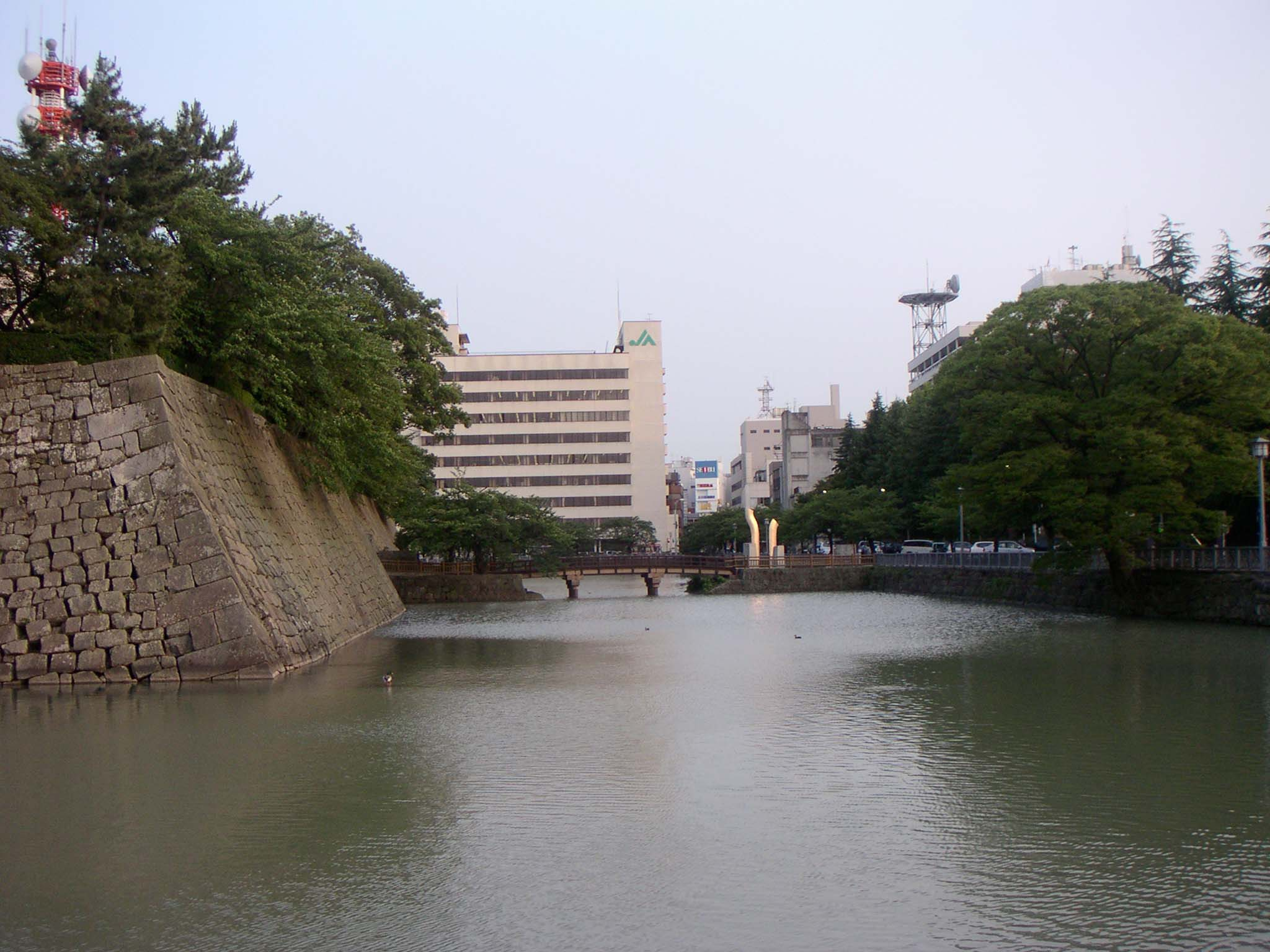
- Moat at the former site of Fukui Castle in Fukui

- Mon of the Matsudaira
- Capital: Fukui Castle
- Area
  - Coordinates: 36°03′56″N 136°13′15″E
- Government
- Daimyō
  - 1601-1607: Yūki Hideyasu (first)
  - 1858-1871: Matsudaira Mochiaki (last)
- Historical era: Edo period
  - Established: 1600
  - Abolition of the han system: 1870
- Contained within
  - Province: Echizen
- Today part of: Fukui Prefecture

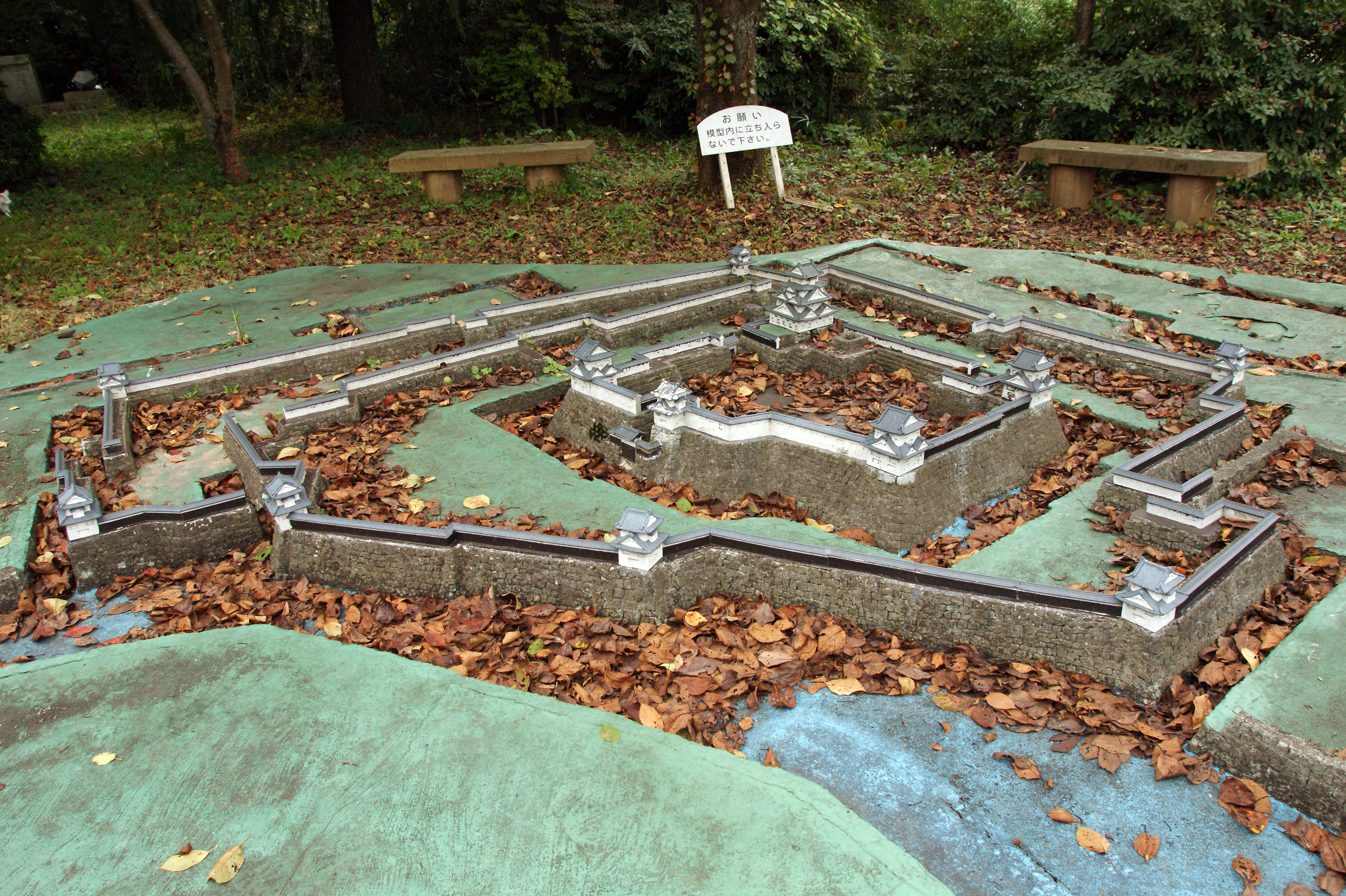
Scale model of Fukui Castle

The Fukui Domain (福井藩, Fukui-han), also known as the Echizen Domain (越前藩, Echizen-han), was a domain (han) of the Tokugawa Shogunate of Japan during the Edo period from 1601 to 1871.

The Fukui Domain was based at Fukui Castle in Echizen Province, the core of the modern city of Fukui, located in the Chūbu region of the island of Honshu. The Fukui Domain was founded by Yūki Hideyasu, the son of shōgun Tokugawa Ieyasu, and was ruled for all of its existence by the shinpan daimyō of the Matsudaira clan. The Fukui Domain was assessed under the Kokudaka system and its value peaked at 680,000 koku. The Fukui Domain was dissolved in the abolition of the han system in 1871 after the Meiji Restoration and its territory was absorbed into Fukui Prefecture.

== History ==
In the Sengoku period, the area around Fukui was known as Kita-no-sho, and controlled by Shibata Katsutoyo, the adopted son of Shibata Katsuie, one of Oda Nobunaga's leading generals, after the Asakura clan was dispossessed by Shibata Katsuie. After Shibata Katsutoyo died of illness during the Battle of Shizugatake in 1583, the area was given to the Aoyama clan. However, the Aoyama sided with the Western Army under Ishida Mitsunari during the Battle of Sekigahara and were thus dispossessed by the victorious Tokugawa Ieyasu. In 1601, Ieyasu awarded Echizen Province to his second son, Yūki Hideyasu as a 670,000 koku fief. Yūki Hideyasu was permitted to change his name to Matsudaira Hideyasu, and he rebuilt Fukui Castle and the surrounding jōkamachi as his capital. His son, Matsudaira Tadanao was of violent disposition and was on bad terms with Shōgun Tokugawa Hidetada, and was consequently dispossessed and banished to Kyushu. He was replaced by his younger brother, Matsudaira Tadamasa, with a reduction in kokudaka to 500,000 koku. His descendants continued to rule over Fukui until the end of the Tokugawa shogunate.

Under Tadamasa's successor, Matsudaira Mitsumichi, the domain was reduced further with the creation of subsidiary domains as Yoshie Domain and Echizen-Maruoka Domain. the domain was plagued with financial difficulties through most of its history, due to frequent flooding, crop failure, epidemics and the profligate spending of its daimyō. In 1661, Fukui became the first han to issue hansatsu (domain paper money).

In 1686, the domain faced a succession crisis and O-Ie Sōdō with the removal of Matsudaira Tsunamasa due to insanity was reduced from 475,000 koku to 250,000 koku. A number of the later daimyō of Fukui were adopted into the clan from the Hitotsubashi-Tokugawa family, one of the Gosankyō, the three lesser branches of the Tokugawa clan.

During the Bakumatsu period, Matsudaira Yoshinaga (better known as Matsudaira Shungaku), was one of the leading political figures in the final years of the Tokugawa shogunate. The final daimyō of Fukui was Matsudaira Mochiaki, who served as imperial governor under the Meiji government until the abolition of the han system in 1871 and the creation of modern Fukui Prefecture.

== List of daimyō ==
#	Name	Tenure	Courtesy title	Court Rank	kokudaka
Matsudaira clan (shinpan) 1601–1871
1	Yūki Hideyasu (結城秀康)	1601-1607	Gon-chūnagon (正三位 権中納言)	Senior 3rd Rank (正三位 )	680,000 koku
2	Matsudaira Tadanao (松平忠直)	1607–1623	Sangi (参議)	Junior 3rd Rank (従三位)	680,000 koku
3	Matsudaira Tadamasa (松平忠昌)	1623–1645	Iyo-no-kami, Sangi (伊予守 参議)	Senior 4th Rank (正四位)	525,280 koku
4	Matsudaira Mitsumichi (松平光通)	1645–1674	Echizen-no-kami ,Sakonoue-gon-shōshō (越前守 左近衛少将)	Junior 4th Rank, Lower Grade (従四位下)	450,000 koku
5	Matsudaira Masachika (松平昌親)	1674–1676	Hyōbu-daisuke,Sakonoue-gon-shōshō (兵部大輔 左近衛権少将)	Junior 4th Rank, Lower Grade (従四位下)	450,000 koku
6	Matsudaira Tsunamasa (松平綱昌)	1676–1686	Echizen-no-kami ,Sakonoue-gon-shōshō (越前守 左近衛少将)	Junior 4th Rank, Lower Grade (従四位下)	450,000 koku
7	Matsudaira Yoshinori (松平吉品)	1686–1710	Hyōbu-daisuke,Sakonoue-gon-shōshō (兵部大輔 左近衛権少将)	Junior 4th Rank, Lower Grade (従四位下)	250,000 koku
8	Matsudaira Yoshikuni (松平吉邦)	1710–1721	Iyo-no-kami,Sakonoue-gon-shōshō (伊予守 左近衛権少将)	Junior 4th Rank, Lower Grade (従四位下)	250,000 koku
9	Matsudaira Munemasa (松平宗昌)	1721–1724	Takumi-no-kami, Jijū (内匠頭 侍従)	Junior 4th Rank, Lower Grade (従四位下)	300,000 koku
10	Matsudaira Munenori (松平宗矩)	1724–1749	Hyōbu-daisuke,Sakonoue-gon-shōshō (兵部大輔 左近衛権少将)	Junior 4th Rank, Lower Grade (従四位下)	300,000 koku
11	Matsudaira Shigemasa (松平重昌)	1749–1758	Echizen-no-kami,Sakonoue-gon-shōshō (越前守 左近衛権少将)	Junior 4th Rank, Upper Grade (従四位上)	300,000 koku
12	Matsudaira Shigetomi (松平重富)	1758–1799	Echizen-no-kami,Sakonoue-gon-chūshō (越前守 左近衛権中将)	Senior 4th Rank, Lower Grade (正四位下)	300,000 koku
13	Matsudaira Haruyoshi (松平治好)	1799–1825	Echizen-no-kami,Sakonoue-gon-chūshō (越前守 左近衛権中将)	Senior 4th Rank, Lower Grade (正四位下)	320,000 koku
14	Matsudaira Naritsugu (松平斉承)	1826–1835	Echizen-no-kami,Sakonoue-gon-shōshō (越前守 左近衛権少将)	Junior 4th Rank, Upper Grade (従四位上)	320,000 koku
15	Matsudaira Narisawa (松平斉善)	1835–1838	Echizen-no-kami,Sakonoue-gon-chūshō (越前守 左近衛権中将)	Senior 4th Rank, Lower Grade (正四位下)	320,000 koku
16	Matsudaira Yoshinaga (松平慶永)	1838–1858	Ōkura-taisuke (大蔵大輔)	Senior 1st Rank (従一位)	320,000 koku
17	Matsudaira Mochiaki (松平慶永)	1858–1871	Echizen-no-kami (越前守)	Senior 2nd Rank (従二位 )	320,000 koku

=== Simplified family tree ===
- Mizuno Tadamasa, Lord of Kariya (1493–1543). Maternal grandfather of Tokugawa Ieyasu. He had issue, including a daughter:
  - O-dainokata (1528–1602). She married twice and had issue, including three sons:
    - Tokugawa Ieyasu, 1st Tokugawa Shōgun (1543–1616; r. 1603–1605) (by O-dainokata's first husband Matsudaira Hirotada (1526–1549))
      - I. Yūki (Matsudaira) Hideyasu, 1st Lord of Fukui (cr. 1601) (1574–1607; Lord of Fukui: 1601–1607) (mother: Kotoku-no-Tsubone)
        - II. Matsudaira Tadanao, 2nd Lord of Fukui (1595–1650; r. 1607–1623) (mother: Nakagawa no Tsubone)
        - III. Matsudaira Tadamasa, 3rd Lord of Fukui (1598–1645; r. 1623–1645) (mother: Nakagawa no Tsubone)
          - Matsudaira Masakatsu, Lord of Matsuoka (1636–1693)
            - VI. Matsudaira Tsunamasa, 6th Lord of Fukui (1661–1699; r. 1676-1686)
            - IX. Matsudaira Munemasa, 9th Lord of Fukui (1675–1724; r. 1721–1724)
            - VIII. Matsudaira Yoshikuni, 8th Lord of Fukui (1681–1722; r. 1710–1721)
          - IV. Matsudaira Mitsumichi, 4th Lord of Fukui (1636–1674; r. 1645–1674)
          - V & VII. Matsudaira Masachika (Yoshiyori, as 7th Lord), 5th and 7th Lord of Fukui (1640–1711; 5th Lord of Fukui: 1674–1676; 7th Lord of Fukui: 1686–1710)
        - Matsudaira Naomasa, Lord of Matsue (1601–1666) (mother: Gesshoōin)
          - Matsudaira Chikayoshi, 1st Lord of Echizen-Matsudaira (1632–1717)
            - Matsudaira Chikatoki, 2nd Lord of Echizen-Matsudaira (1659–1702)
              - Matsudaira Naoyuki, 1st Lord of Itoigawa (1682–1718)
        - Matsudaira Naomoto, Lord of Himeji (1604–1648) (mother: Shinryō-in)
          - Matsudaira Naonori, Lord of Shirakawa (1642–1695)
            - Matsudaira Motochika, Lord of Shirakawa (1682–1721)
              - X. Matsudaira Munenori, 10th Lord of Fukui (1715–1749; r. 1724–1749)
      - Tokugawa Yorinobu, 1st Lord of Kishū (1602–1671) (mother: Kageyama-dono)
        - Tokugawa Mitsutada, 2nd Lord of Kishū (1627–1705)
          - Tokugawa Yoshimune, 5th Lord of Kishū, 8th Tokugawa Shōgun (1684–1751; Lord of Kishū: 1705–1716; Shōgun: 1716–1745) (mother: Oyuri no Kata later Jōenin (1655–1726))
            - Tokugawa Munetada, 1st head of the Hitotsubashi-Tokugawa line (1721–1765) (mother: Oume no Kata later Shinshin'in (1700–1721))
              - XI. Matsudaira Shigemasa, 11th Lord of Fukui (1743–1758; r. 1749–1758) (mother: Ichijo Akiko later Fushin'in)
              - XII. Matsudaira Shigetomi, 12th Lord of Fukui (1748–1809; r. 1758–1799) (mother: Oyuka no Kata)
                - XIII. Matsudaira Haruyoshi, 13th Lord of Fukui (1768–1826; r. 1799–1825)
                  - XIV. Matsudaira Naritsugu, 14th Lord of Fukui (1811–1835; r. 1826–1835)
              - Tokugawa Harusada, 2nd head of the Hitotsubashi-Tokugawa line (1751–1827) (mother: Oyuka no Kata)
                - Tokugawa Ienari, 11th Tokugawa Shōgun (1773–1841; r. 1786–1841)
                  - XV. Matsudaira Narisawa, 15th Lord of Fukui (1820–1838; r. 1835–1838) (mother: Ohachi no Kata later Honrin'in (?-1850))
                - Tokugawa Narimasa, 4th head of the Tayasu-Tokugawa line (1779–1848)
                  - XVI. Matsudaira Yoshinaga, 16th Lord of Fukui (1828–1890; r. 1838–1858)
                  - Tokugawa Yoshiyori, 8th head of the Tayasu-Tokugawa line (1828–1876)
                    - Tokugawa Satotaka, 9th head of the Tayasu-Tokugawa line, 1st Count (1865–1941)
                      - Captain Tokugawa Satonari IJN, 10th head of the Tayasu-Tokugawa line, 2nd Count (1899–1961)
                        - Matsudaira Munetoshi, 20th family head (b. 1940; 20th family head: 1957–present), m. Matsudaira Tomoko (b. 1944, see below), and has issue, including:
                          - Matsudaira Teruyasu (b. 1965)
                            - Matsudaira Shizuki (b. 1994)
    - Matsudaira Yasumoto, 1st Lord of Sekiyado (1552–1603) (by O-dainokata's second husband Hisamatsu Toshikatsu (1526–1587))
      - Matsudaira Tadayoshi, 2nd Lord of Sekiyado (1582–1624)
        - Matsudaira Yasunao, Lord of Nagashina (1623–1696)
          - Matsudaira Sadakazu (1662–1745), m. the daughter of Matsudaira Tadamasa, Lord of Kariya (1610–1673)
            - Matsudaira Naoyoshi, 2nd Lord of Itoigawa (1701–1739)
              - Matsudaira Katafusa, 3rd Lord of Itoigawa (1734–1773)
                - Matsudaira Naotsugu, 4th Lord of Itoigawa (1759–1814)
                  - Matsudaira Naomasu, 5th Lord of Itoigawa (1789–1833)
                    - Matsudaira Naoharu, 6th Lord of Itoigawa (1810–1878)
                      - XVII. Matsudaira Mochiaki, 17th Lord of Fukui, 7th Lord of Itoigawa, 17th family head, 1st Marquess (1836–1890; Lord of Itoigawa: 1857–1858; Lord of Fukui: 1858–1869; Governor of Fukui: 1869–1871; 17th family head: 1858–1890; Count: 1884; Marquess: 1888)
                        - Matsudaira Yasutaka, 18th family head and 2nd Marquess (1867–1930; 18th family head and 2nd Marquess: 1890–1930)
                          - Matsudaira Yasumasa, 19th family head and 3rd Marquess (1893–1957; 19th family head: 1930–1957; 3rd Marquess: 1930–1947)
                            - Matsudaira Yasuchika (1916–1947)
                              - Matsudaira Tomoko (b. 1944), m. Matsudaira Munetoshi, 20th family head (b. 1940)
    - Hisamatsu Sadakatsu, Lord of Kuwana (1560–1624)
      - Matsudaira Tadamasa, Lord of Kariya (1610–1673)
        - A daughter, who married Matsudaira Sadakazu (1662–1745), and had issue – see above.

== Holdings at the end of the Edo period ==
Like most domains in the han system, Fukui Domain consisted of several discontinuous territories calculated to provide the assigned kokudaka, based on periodic cadastral surveys and projected agricultural yields,

- Echizen Province
  - 158 villages in Asuwa District
  - 136 villages in Yoshida District
  - 57 villages in Nanjō District
  - 57 villages in Imadate District
  - 93 villages in Nyū District
  - 8 villages in Ōno District
  - 168 villages in Sakai District

In addition, Fukui Domain administered the extensive tenryō territories in Echizen Province on behalf of the Tokugawa shogunate, deriving substantial revenue from these holdings, which were not counted as part of its nominal kokudaka.

== See also ==
- List of Han
