= Shinpan (daimyo) =

Shinpan (親藩) was a class of daimyō in the Tokugawa Shogunate of Japan who were certain relatives of the Shōgun.

While all shinpan were relatives of the shōgun, not all relatives of the shōgun were shinpan; an example of this is the Matsudaira clan of the Okutono Domain. Non-daimyō relatives, such as the Gosankyō, were also known as kamon – thus the shinpan lords were alternatively known as kamon daimyō (家門大名). Shinpan included the Gosanke, the Matsudaira clan of Aizu and the Matsudaira clan of the Fukui Domain. These branch families were created after the 1600 Battle of Sekigahara; there were 23 shinpan domains, producing a total of approximately 2.6 million koku of rice. Because they were family and thus could wield informal power, they were not permitted to hold official positions in the bakufu. These families could also provide a shogunal successor if necessary.

== See also ==
- Fudai daimyō
- Tozama daimyō
