= Matsudaira Tadamasa =

Japanese samurai

- 松平 忠昌
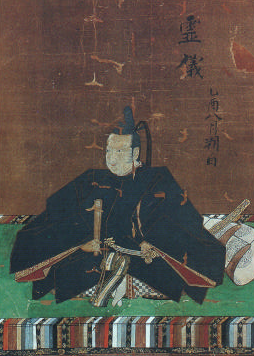
- Born: January 21, 1598; Osaka, Japan
- Died: September 20, 1645 (aged 47); Edo, Japan
- Burial place: Eiheiji, Fukui, Japan
- Spouse(s): Hanahime, daughter of Asano Yoshinaga; Ichihime, daughter of kuge Hirohashi Kuroishi
- Children: Matsudaira Mitsumichi; Matsudaira Masachika
- Father: Yūki Hideyasu

1st Daimyō of Anegasaki Domain
- In office 1607–1615
- Succeeded by: Matsudaira Naomasa

7th Daimyō of Shimotsuma Domain
- In office 1615–1616
- Preceded by: Tokugawa Yorifusa
- Succeeded by: Matsudaira Sadatsuna

Daimyō of Matsushiro Domain
- In office 1616–1618
- Preceded by: Matsudaira Tadateru
- Succeeded by: Sakai Tadakatsu

Daimyō of Takada Domain
- In office 1618–1623
- Preceded by: Sakai Tadakatsu
- Succeeded by: Matsudaira Mitsunaga

Daimyō of Fukui Domain
- In office 1623–1645
- Preceded by: Matsudaira Tadanao
- Succeeded by: Matsudaira Mitsumichi

Matsudaira Tadamasa (松平 忠昌; 21 January 1598 – 20 September 1645) was an early to mid-Edo period Japanese samurai, and daimyō.

== Biography ==
Tadamasa was born in Osaka as the second son of Yūki Hideyasu. His childhood name was Toramatsu (虎松) later become Toranosuke (虎之助). In 1607, he was received in audience by his grandfather, Tokugawa Ieyasu and uncle Tokugawa Hidetada. Hidetada took a liking to the boy, and ordered that he be raised in the Tokugawa household by Eishō-in together with Tokugawa Yorinobu. In the same year, he was assigned a fief of 10,000 koku, and became daimyō of Kazusa-Anegasaki Domain.

He was noted for his skill in the martial arts, and accompanied Hidetada during the Siege of Osaka, where he was frustrated that he would not be allowed to participate in the battle due to his youth. He strongly petitioned Hidetada to perform his genpuku ceremony before the start of the Osaka summer campaign, and Hidetada agreed, granting him a kanji from his name and Court rank of Senior Fifth Rank, Lower Grade and the courtesy title was Iyo-no-kami. He subsequently distinguished himself in combat with his prowess with the spear, which later became an heirloom of the Echizen-Matsudaira clan.

As a reward for his actions in battle, he was transferred to Shimotsuma Domain in Hitachi Province (30,000 koku) in 1615, but the following year he replaced the disgraced Matsudaira Tadateru at Matsushiro Domain in Shinano Province (120,000 koku). In 1619 he was transferred again, this time to Takada Domain in Echigo Province (250,000 koku). In 1623, he replaced his elder brother Matsudaira Tadanao as daimyō of Fukui Domain (500,000 koku) In 1626 his court rank was raised to Senior Fourth Rank, Lower Grade. In 1634, he accompanied Shōgun Tokugawa Iemitsu to Kyoto, and Fukui Domain reached its peak kokudaka of 505,600 koku.

In 1637, he was disappointed that no order came to lead his troops during the Shimabara Rebellion, so he visited the battle in a private capacity with only twelve retainers. In 1643, he ordered the rebuilding of Mikuni Harbor as the main port of Fukui Domain. He died in 1648 at the domain's residence in Edo. On his death, seven of his senior retainers also committed junshi. His grave is at the temple of Eihei-ji in Fukui.

He had a magnificent upper residence (kamiyashiki) constructed outside Edo Castle.

== Family ==
- Father: Yuki Hideyasu
- Mother: Seiryō-in, daughter Nakagawa Kazushige
- Wives:
  - Asano Hanahime, daughter of Asano Yoshinaga of Wakayama Domain
  - Ichihime, daughter of kuge Hirohashi Kuroishi
- Concubines:
  - Kōshō-in (Uragami dono)
  - Shiraishi dono
- Children:
  - Matsudaira Masakatsu (1636-1693) by Shiraishi
  - Matsudaira Mitsumichi by Ichihime
  - Chōmatsu
  - Tokumatsu
  - Matsudaira Masachika by Uragami
  - Manhime married Matsudaira Tsunataka of Matsue Domain
  - Kunihime married Honda Shigeaki of Muraoka Domain later married Asukai Masanao (kuge)
  - Senhime married Mōri Tsunahiro of Chōshū Domain
  - Furihime married Doi Toshinao of Owa Domain

Preceded by ______	Daimyō of Anegasaki; 1607–1615	Succeeded by Matsudaira Naomasa
Preceded by Tokugawa Yorifusa	Daimyō of Shimotsuma; 1615–1616	Succeeded by Matsudaira Sadatsuna
Preceded by Matsudaira Tadateru	Daimyō of Matsushiro; 1616–1618	Succeeded by Sakai Tadakatsu
Preceded by Sakai Tadakatsu	Daimyō of Takada; 1618–1623	Succeeded by Matsudaira Mitsunaga
Preceded by Matsudaira Tadanao	3rd Daimyō of Fukui; 1623–1645	Succeeded by Matsudaira Mitsumichi
