= Scrip of Edo period Japan =

Japanese form of paper money

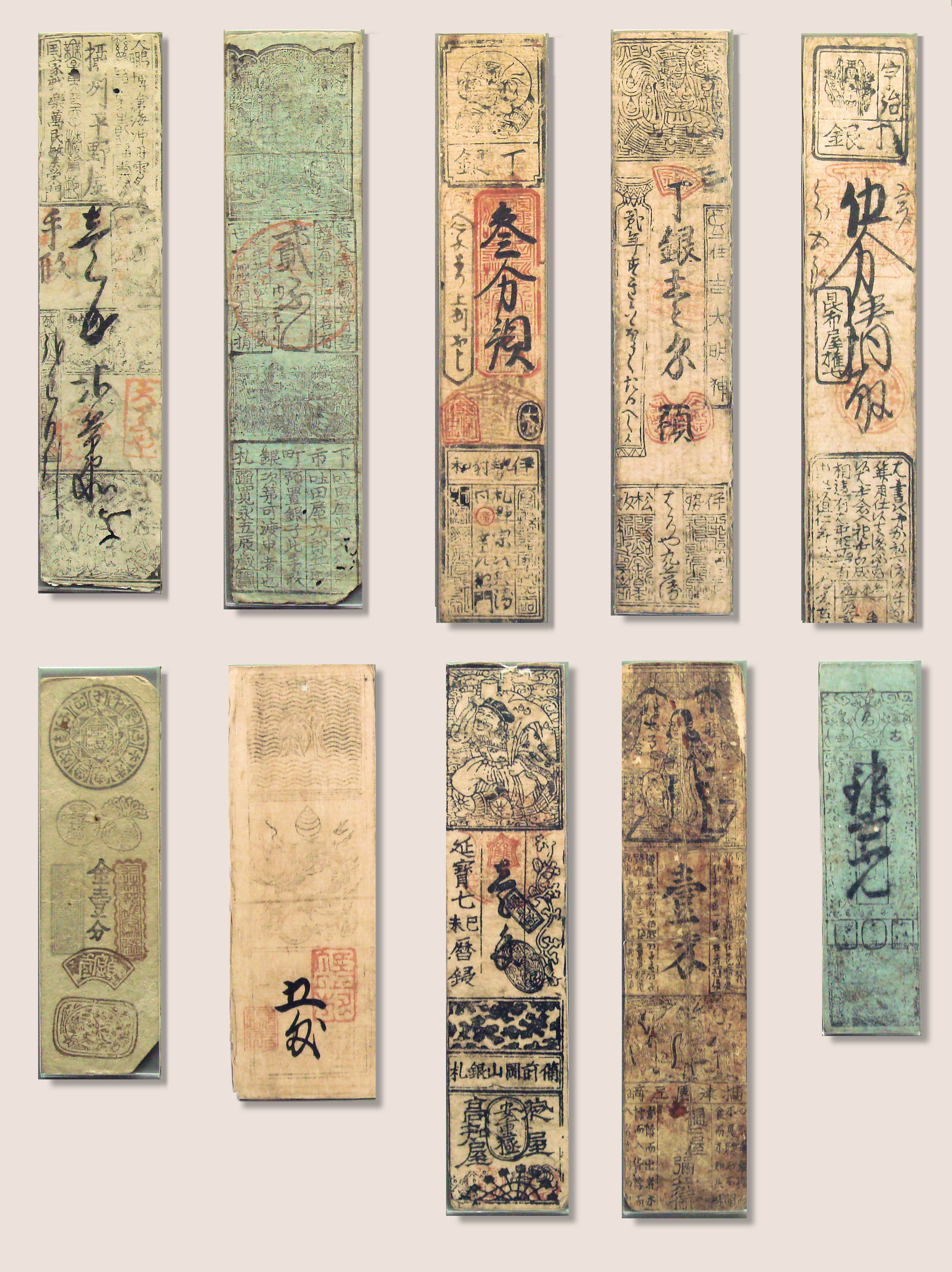
Feudal notes of Japan, Edo period, 17th century.

During the Edo period, feudal domains of Japan issued scrip called hansatsu (藩札) for use within the domain. This paper currency supplemented the coinage of the Tokugawa shogunate. Most scrip carried a face value in silver coinage, but gold and copper scrip also circulated. In addition, some scrip was marked for exchange in kind for a commodity such as rice. In addition to those issued by the domains, forms of paper money were also issued by rice brokers in Osaka and Edo. Originally used only as a representation of amounts of rice (subdivisions of koku) owned by the scrip-holder and held in the Osaka or Edo merchants' storehouse, these scrips quickly came to be used as currency.

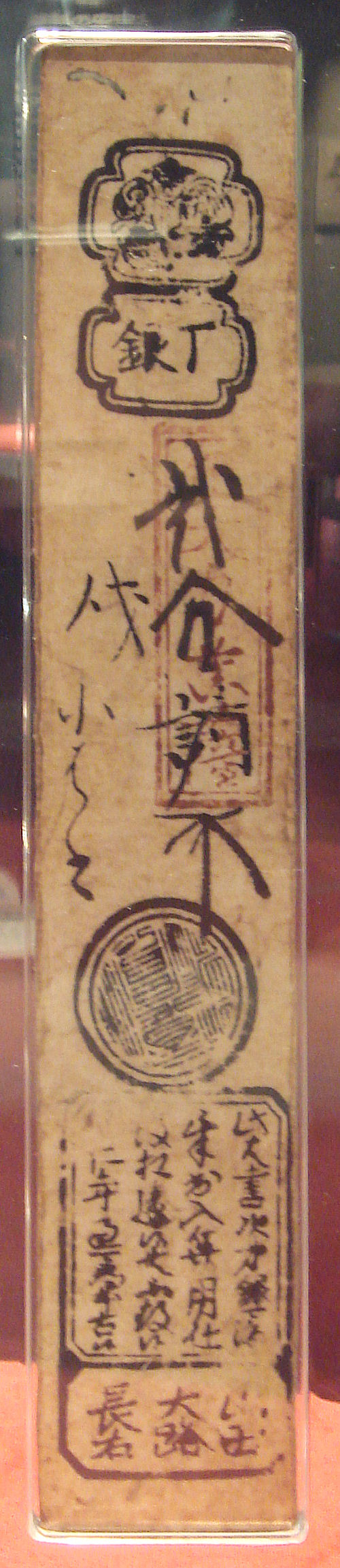
A Yamada Hagaki, Japan's first banknote, circa 1600.

Japan's first banknotes, called Yamada Hagaki (山田羽書), were issued around 1600 by Shinto priests also working as merchants in the Ise-Yamada (modern Mie Prefecture), in exchange for silver. This was earlier than the first goldsmith banker notes issued in England around 1640.

An early issue of domain scrip took place in the Fukui domain in 1661. As early as 1610, private notes had been printed for purposes such as payment of workers on construction projects. Domains issued scrip to supplement coins in times of shortage and to adjust the amount in circulation. They also exchanged scrip for coins to improve the financial situation of the domain. By the end of the period, eight out of ten domains issued paper, as did a few daikan-sho and hatamoto.

Accepting scrip always carried the risk of forfeiture. During the Edo period, the shogunate seized some domains, and transferred others; on such occasions, the new daimyō might not honor the old scrip. Following the condemnation and death of the daimyō Asano Naganori, for example, Ōishi Yoshio, a house elder in the Akō Domain (and later the leader of the Forty-seven rōnin), ordered the redemption of scrip at 60% of face value. In addition, in times of financial difficulty, the domain might simply declare scrip void. Early in the period, domains printed their own scrip; later, they operated through prominent merchants, whose credibility was important to the acceptance of the currency.

The shogunate prohibited the use of scrip in 1707. In 1730, however, Tokugawa Yoshimune authorized domains to issue paper with time limits for redemption. Large domains (200,000 koku and above) could issue currency valid for 25 years, and small domains for 15 years. His son Ieshige prohibited new issue of scrip, and restricted the circulation of scrip other than that exchangeable for silver, in 1759. Despite the prohibitions, domains in severe financial straits occasionally issued paper money.

Each domain formulated its own rules about its scrip. While there were some that forbade the shogunate's coinage, many allowed both coins and scrip to circulate. As a rule, scrip circulated only within the domain that issued it, but there were exceptions. For example, paper issued by the Kishū domain in 1866 was also used in Yamato, Izumi, Kawachi, Settsu, and Harima Provinces.

In 1871, the Government of Meiji Japan ordered the abolition of the han system and ordered the exchange of all scrip for the national currency. Exchange continued until 1879. In the interim, some scrip carried markings from the central government indicating the value in yen and the smaller sen and rin.

== Sources ==
- Bank of Japan
- 新井政義（編集者）『日本史事典』。東京：旺文社1987(p. 329)
- 竹内理三（編）『日本史小辞典』。東京：角川書店1985(p. 290)
