= Yūki Hideyasu =

Japanese samurai

- 結城 秀康
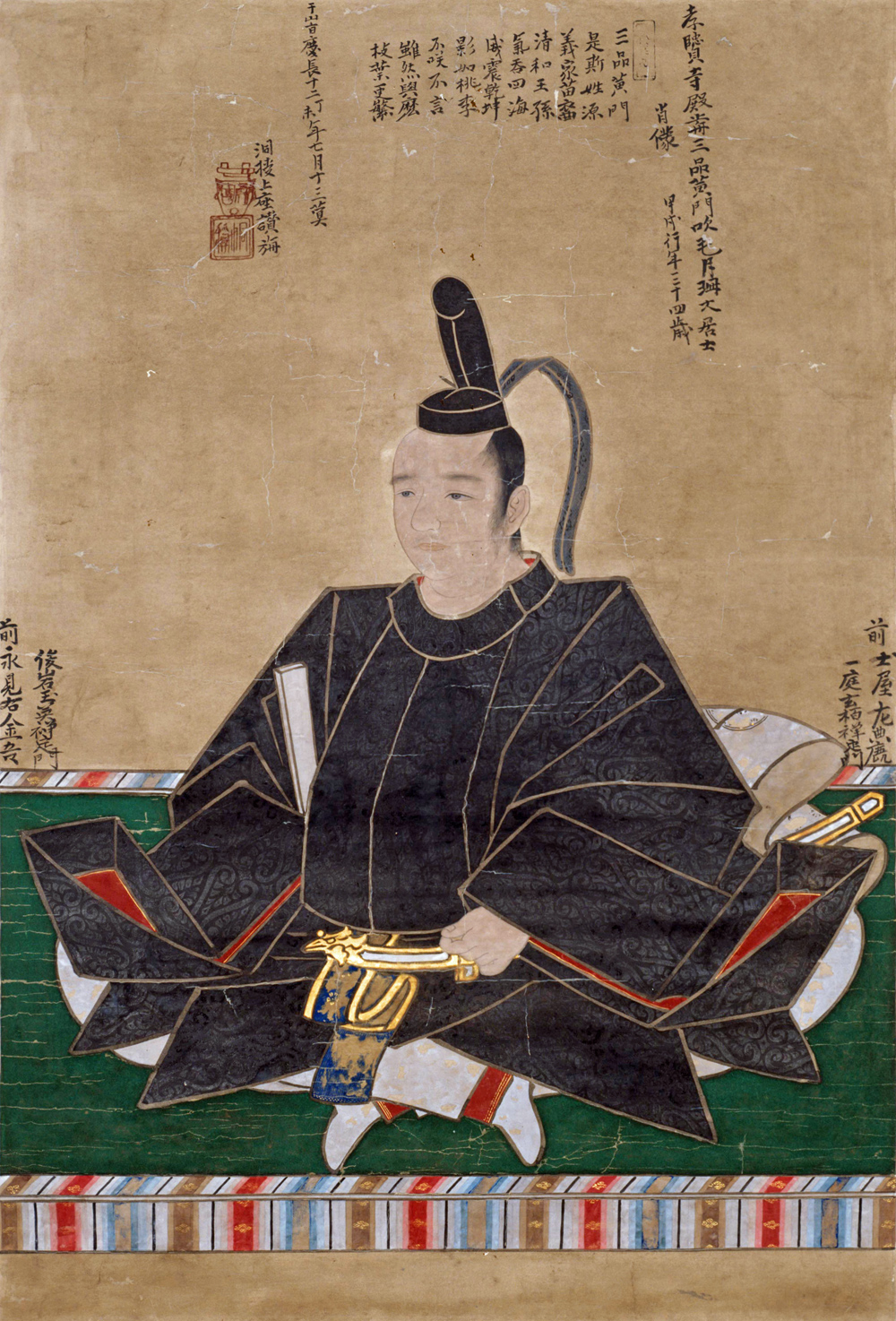

Daimyō of Yūki Domain
- In office 1590–1601
- Succeeded by: Mizuno Katsunaga

Daimyō of Fukui Domain
- In office 1601–1607
- Preceded by: -none-
- Succeeded by: Matsudaira Tadanao

Personal details
- Born: Tokugawa Ogimaru; March 1, 1574 Hamamatsu, Japan
- Died: June 2, 1607 (aged 33) Fukui, Fukui, Japan
- Spouse: Tsuruhime daughter of Yūki Harutomo
- Children: Matsudaira Tadanao; Matsudaira Tadamasa
- Parent: Tokugawa Ieyasu (father)
- Relatives: Toyotomi Hideyoshi (adopted father); Yūki Harutomo (adopted father)

Military service
- Allegiance: Matsudaira clan Tokugawa clan Toyotomi clan Yuki clan
- Battles/wars: Kyushu Campaign; Odawara Campaign; Korean campaign Sekigahara campaign

Yūki Hideyasu (結城 秀康; 1 March 1574 – 2 June 1607) was a Japanese samurai who lived during the Azuchi–Momoyama and early Edo periods. He was the daimyō of Fukui Domain in Echizen.

== Early life ==
Hideyasu was born as Tokugawa Ogimaru (徳川於義丸) in 1574, the second son of Tokugawa Ieyasu, by Lady Oman (also known as Lady Kogō), a handmaiden to his wife, Lady Tsukiyama. When Oman became pregnant, Ieyasu feared his wife's wrath, so he sheltered the girl in the home of his retainer Honda Shigetsugu, in Ofumi Village near Hamamatsu Castle, and it was there that Ogimaru and his brother were born.

Oman is said to have given birth to twins, and that Ogimaru's brother succeeded Oman's father as priest of Chiryū Shrine in Mikawa Province.

The young Ogimaru was, for some reason, disliked by his father Ieyasu. It was not until age three that he met Ieyasu, and even that meeting, cold as it was, was not arranged by the father, but instead by Ogimaru's elder half-brother, Matsudaira Nobuyasu. After Oda Nobunaga demanded that Ieyasu order Nobuyasu's seppuku, Ogimaru would have been the next in line to inherit the Tokugawa headship by birth; however, as part of the peace negotiations following the Battle of Komaki-Nagakute, he was given in adoption (in reality as a hostage) to the childless Hashiba Hideyoshi in 1584. Coming of age while living with Hideyoshi, Ogimaru was given the name Hashiba Hideyasu, which combined the names of his adoptive father and biological father. He was also granted courtesy title of Mikawa-no-kami, and his Court rank was Senior Fifth Rank, Lower Grade, raised to Ukonoue-gon-shōshō and Senior Fourth Rank, Lower Grade in 1585

== Mature years ==
Hideyasu took part in his first campaign during the Kyūshū Campaign of 1587, leading the assault on Buzen-Iwaishi Castle. He also received honors for his distinction in the pacification of Hyūga Province. Hideyasu also took part in the Siege of Odawara (1590) and the Japanese invasions of Korea (1592–98). His successes in these campaigns earned him respect as an able field commander, despite his youth.

However, in 1589, a natural son was born to Toyotomi Hideyoshi. Hideyoshi had adopted several promising candidates as heir over the years, and began to give these men in adoption to other great houses to avoid a potential conflict over the succession. Hideyasu was given in adoption in 1590 to Yūki Harutomo of Shimōsa Province, and married Harutomo's niece, becoming Yūki Hideyasu and succeeded to the Yūki headship and its 101,000 koku holding.

== Later years ==
During the Battle of Sekigahara, Yūki Hideyasu was ordered by Ieyasu to remain in his holdings in Shimōsa, possibly because of his pro-Toyotomi sympathies, and possibility because his emergence as a strong military leader might threaten the prestige and position of his younger half-brother, Tokugawa Hidetada. Following the Battle of Sekigahara and the establishment of the Tokugawa shogunate, he was given all of Echizen Province (670,000 koku) as his fief. In 1604, he was allowed to take the surname Matsudaira. In 1605, his court rank was elevated to Senior Third Rank, and his courtesy title to Gon-Chūnagon. Professor Sunao Kawaguchi suspected the reason Hideyasu was not appointed as successor of Ieyasu as Shogun was because he spent most of his life close to the house of Toyotomi clan.

Hideyasu died in 1607 at the age of 34, possibly from syphilis. His death came seven years after the Battle of Sekigahara and eight years before Tokugawa Ieyasu completed the destruction of the Toyotomi clan at the Siege of Osaka. He left a will to his heir urging support for Toyotomi Hideyori even if the Tokugawa decided to attack. His son and heir, Matsudaira Tadanao ignored his father's will and thus the Echizen-Matsudaira clan survived to the Meiji restoration of 1868.

== Family ==
- Father: Tokugawa Ieyasu (1543–1616)
- Mother: Lady Oman (1548–1620) later Chōshō-in
- Wife, concubines, children:
  - Wife: Tsuruhime, daughter of Yūki Harutomo
  - Concubine: Nakagawa no Tsubone later Seiryō-in
    - Matsudaira Tadanao (1595–1650)
    - Matsudaira Tadamasa (1598–1645)
  - Concubine: ???
    - Kisahime (1598–1655) married Mōri Hidenari
  - Concubine: Gesshoōin
    - Matsudaira Naomasa (1601–1666) inherited Matsue Domain
  - Concubine: Shinryō-in
    - Matsudaira Naomoto (1604–1648) inherited Himeji Domain
  - Concubine: Nao no Tsubone later Nagaju-in
    - Matsudaira Naoyoshi (1605–1678) inherited Ōno Domain

Preceded by Yūki Harutomo	Shimōsa-Yūki family head 1590-1604	Succeeded by Matsudaira Naomoto
Preceded by ______	Daimyō of Yūki Domain; 1590–1601	Succeeded by Mizuno Katsunaga
Preceded by -none-	Daimyō of Fukui Domain; 1601–1607	Succeeded by Matsudaira Tadanao
