= Miharu =

Miharu may refer to:

- Miharu (given name), a feminine Japanese given name
- Miharu Dam
- Miharu Domain, a Japanese domain of the Edo period, located in Mutsu Province
- Miharu, Fukushima, a town located in Tamura District, Fukushima, Japan
- Miharu Station
- Miharu Takizakura, an ancient cherry tree in Miharu, Fukushima, in northern Japan
