= Wakimoto Castle =

Castle ruins in Oga, Japan

Coordinates: 39°54′09″N 139°53′21″E

- 脇本城
- Oga, Akita Prefecture, Japan
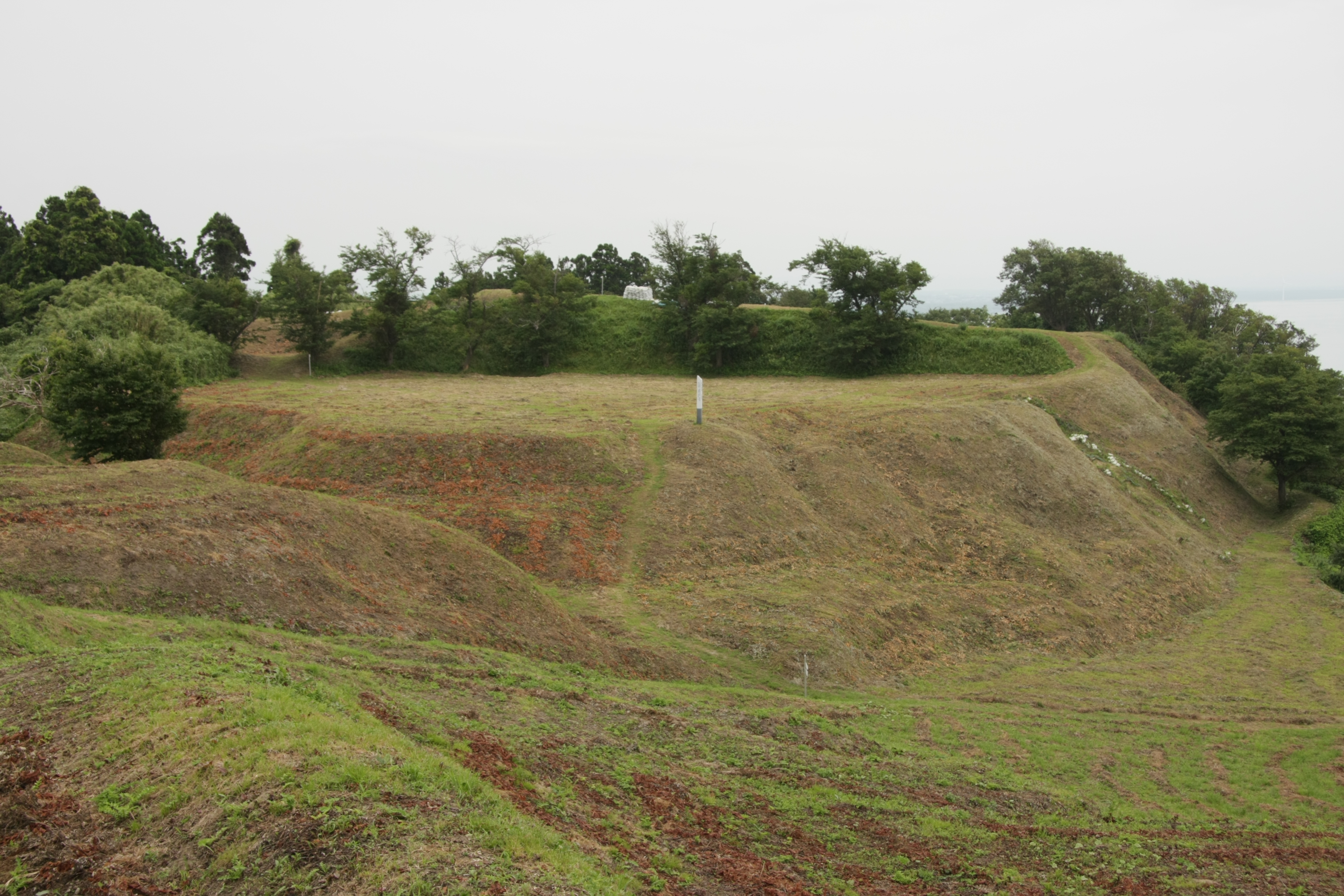
- Uchidate compound of Wakimoto castle

Site information
- Type: yamashiro-style Japanese castle
- Open to the public: yes
- Condition: ruins

Location
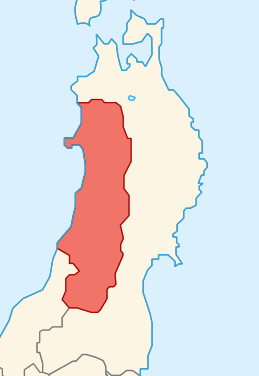

Site history
- Built by: Andō (Akita) clan
- In use: Sengoku period
- Demolished: 1590-1602

Wakimoto Castle (脇本城, Wakimoto-jō) is a Sengoku period Japanese castle located in Oga, Akita Prefecture, in the Tōhoku region of Japan. The site was designated a National Historic Site of Japan in 1979.

== Background ==
The precise date of the construction of Wakimoto Castle is not known, but it is presumed to be sometime during the 15th century. The castle was the stronghold of the Andō clan, whose origins are also shrouded in mystery. The Andō were possibly descendants of the indigenous Emishi people who populated the Tōhoku region prior to the arrival of the Yamato Japanese in the late Nara period. The Andō were a maritime clan who controlled the northern Sea of Japan coastline of Japan, including southern Ezo (Hokkaido), and who engaged in trade and fishing. Under the Kamakura shogunate and into the Nanbokuchō period, the clan enjoyed virtual autonomy in their domains, trading with mainland Asia through the Tosaminato port in what is now Aomori Prefecture and from the 14th century at Tsuchizaki Port in what is now the city of Akita. However, in the 15th century, the Andō came under attack by the Nanbu clan based at Sannohe Castle and was forced to retreat from Tosaminoto Port to Hokkaido. Despite numerous counterattacks, the Andō were unable to recover Tosaminato, but a branch of the clan called the "Minato Andō" held out at Tsuchizaki. In the middle of the 15th century, the Minato Andō asked the main branch of the clan to relocate from Hokkaido to Dewa Province, and under Andō Masasue (d.1488), they built Hiyama Castle near Noshiro, becoming the "Hiyama Andō". The two branches of the clan co-existed for a century.

The two branches of the clan united under Andō Chikasue (1539-1587). Andō Chikasue rebuilt a pre-existing fortification at Wakimoto from 1577, and used this as his seat.

== Structure ==
Wakimoto Castle is located on a flat-topped hill with a height of 100 meters at the base of Oga Peninsula near the edge of the Akita Plain and near the mouth of Lake Hachirogata (which has now disappeared due to land reclamation). It was protected by the lake to its front, and by the Sea of Japan to its rear. At the peak of the hill there is a group of square-shaped enclosures which contained the residence, surrounded by kuruwa terraces, which might be a remnant of the original castle. In the 1577 reconstruction, an adjacent peak facing the sea was incorporated into the castle area, separated by ridges to the east and south, with a new Inner bailey at the tip of the eastern ridge. This enclosure had a square profile, 100 meters on each side, protected by a five-meter high clay rampart and several smaller surrounding enclosures. The southern ridge has two layers of enclosures for senior retainers; however, a large portion of the southern ridge has now collapsed into the ocean due to erosion and after earthquakes. Between the new and the old castle enclosures was a road protected by a clay wall with a length of 300 meters. The total castle area spreads over a 1000 meter wide x 1500 meter long area. On the eastern hillside was the jōkamachi, which extended down the coast for a kilometer, and which was also protected by an outer barrier. These fortifications made Wakimoto Castle one of the largest in eastern Japan at the time.

== Subsequent history ==
Andō Chikasue pledged fealty to Oda Nobunaga and to Toyotomi Hideyoshi and was confirmed in his holdings which extended over two-thirds of Dewa Province. He also changed his surname from Andō to "Akita". After his death, the clan fell into civil war between followers of his son, Akita Sanesue (1576-1660) and loyalists of the former Minato Andō. Sanesue moved his seat to Minato Castle in Tsuchizaki and Wakimoto Castle fell into ruins. After many vicissitudes, the Akita clan continued to the end of the Tokugawa shogunate as daimyō of Miharu Domain in what is now Fukushima Prefecture.

No buildings or structures remain of Wakimoto Castle today, however, the terraces with clay ramparts and dry moats remain. The castle was listed as one of the Continued Top 100 Japanese Castles in 2017. The site is located approximately 25 minutes on foot from JR East Oga Line Wakimoto Station.

== See also ==
- List of Historic Sites of Japan (Akita)

== Literature ==
- Schmorleitz, Morton S. (1974). Castles in Japan. Tokyo: Charles E. Tuttle Co. pp. 144–145. ISBN 0-8048-1102-4.
- Motoo, Hinago (1986). Japanese Castles. Tokyo: Kodansha. p. 200 pages. ISBN 0-87011-766-1.
- Mitchelhill, Jennifer (2004). Castles of the Samurai: Power and Beauty. Tokyo: Kodansha. p. 112 pages. ISBN 4-7700-2954-3.
- Turnbull, Stephen (2003). Japanese Castles 1540-1640. Osprey Publishing. p. 64 pages. ISBN 1-84176-429-9.
