= Minato Castle =

Castle in Akita, Japan

Minato Castle 湊城
- Tsuchizaki Minato, Akita, Akita Prefecture, Japan
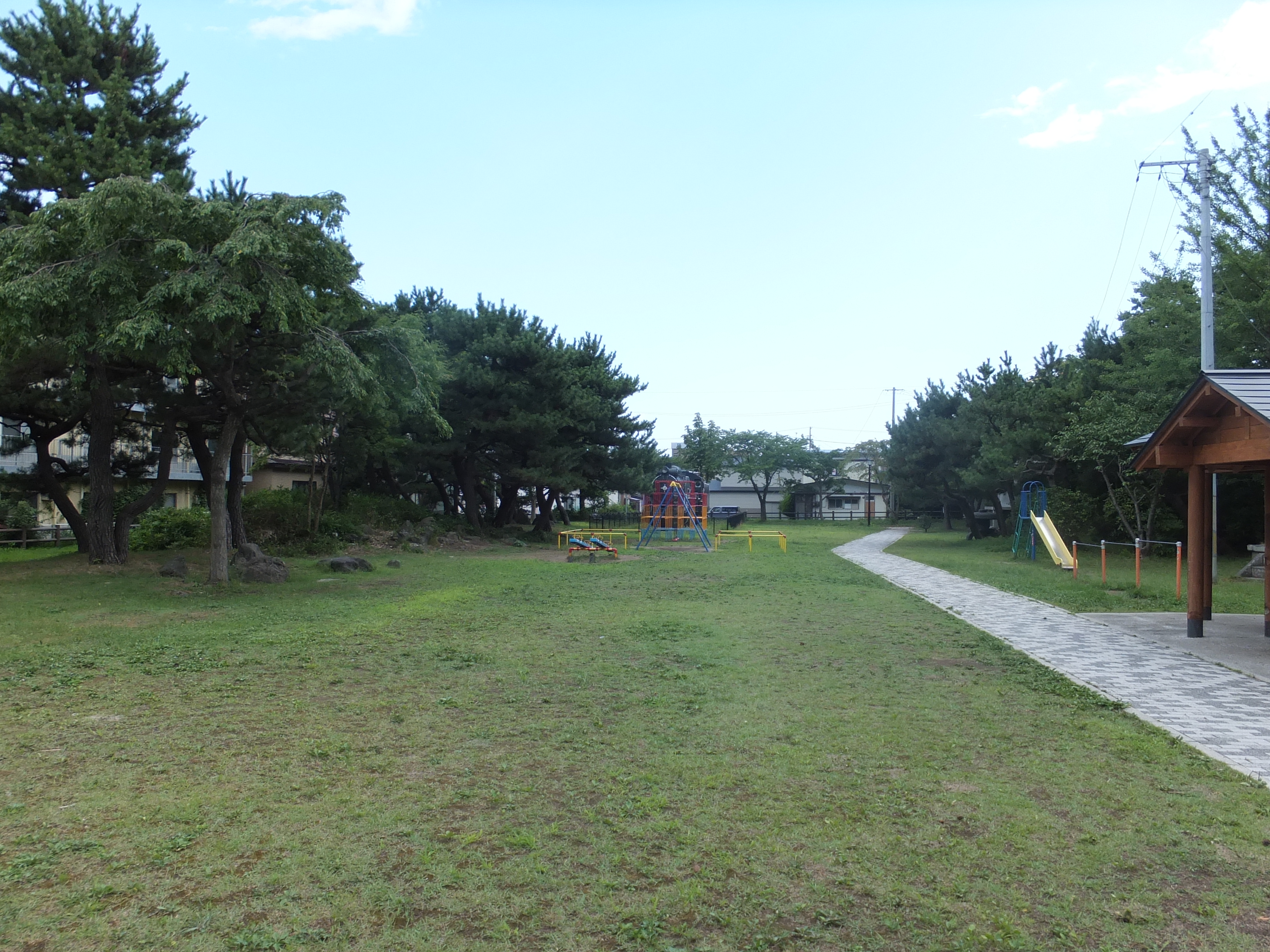
- Tsuchizaki Gaiku Park

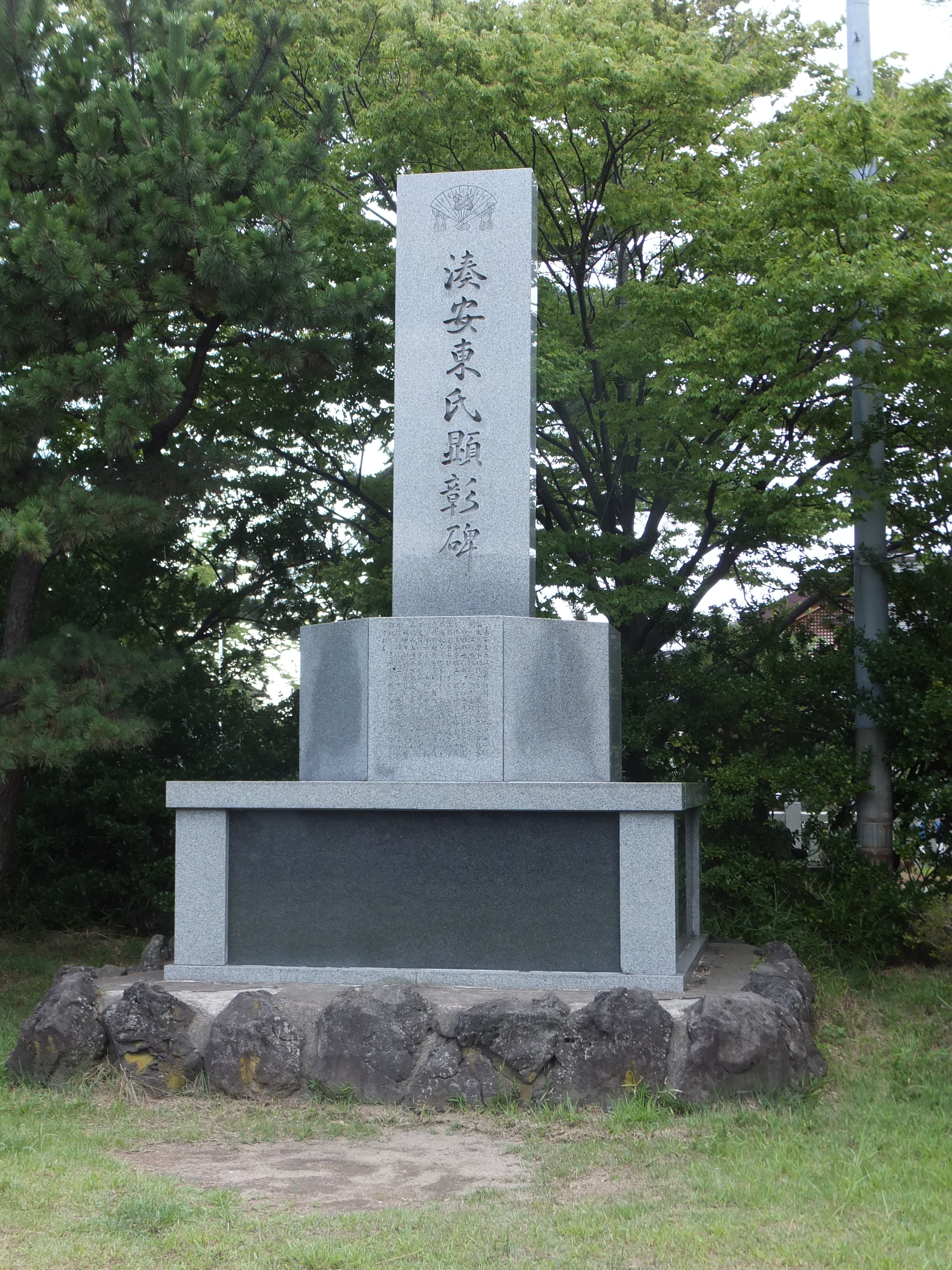
- Minato Ando clan monument

Site information
- Type: hirayama-style Japanese castle
- Controlled by: City of Akita, Tsuchizaki Shinmeisha
- Open to the public: yes
- Condition: Ruins

Location
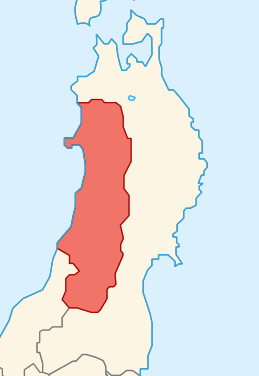
- Coordinates: 39°45′27.1″N 140°4′16″E

Site history
- Built: 1436 ?
- Built by: Ando Yasusue ?
- In use: 1436 ?-1604
- Battles/wars: Minato Disturbance

Minato Castle (湊城, Minato-jō) was a Japanese castle in what is now Tsuchizaki Minato, Akita, Akita Prefecture, Japan. Throughout the Muromachi period, Minato Castle was home to the Ando clan, daimyō of Akita Domain, rulers of northern Dewa Province.

== History ==
The early history of the castle is shrouded but it might have been constructed by the second of the Minato branch of the Ando family, Ando Yasusue, in 1436. Ando "Big Dipper" Chikasue of the Hiyama Ando went down from Hiyama Castle to Minato Castle uniting the two clan branches. After the Battle of Sekigahara, his son, Akita Sanesue was moved to Shishido, in Hitachi Province, and Satake Yoshinobu of Hitachi was relegated to Minato Castle in 1602. Satake began to build the new Kubota Castle and Minato Castle was abandoned in 1604.

== Access ==
The exit station is Tsuchizaki Station (north next of Akita Station).

2-minute walk straight from the exit of the station and you can soon see Tsuchizaki Shinmeisha Shrine on your left.

== See also ==
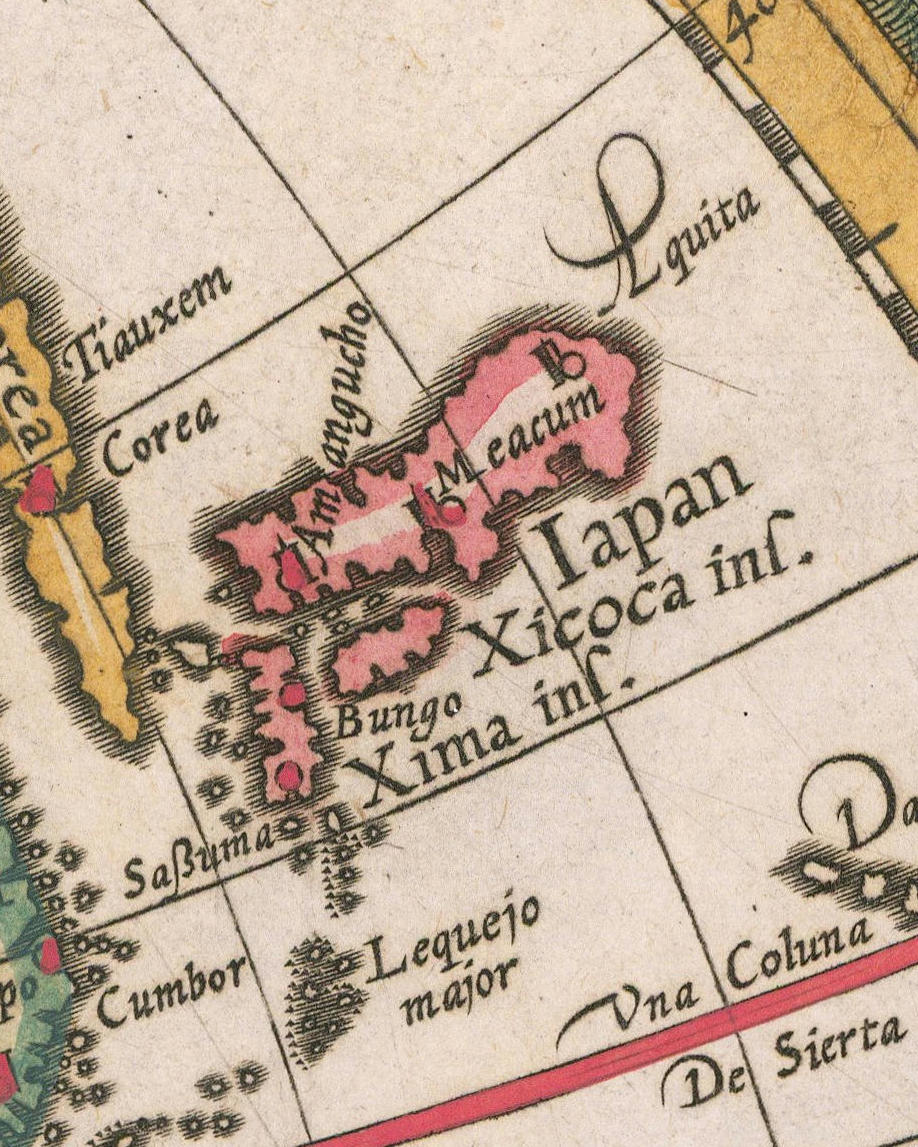
In this 1596 World map, Port of Akita is described as "Aquita"

- Akita Castle
- Port of Akita
- List of Historic Sites of Japan (Akita)
