= Hiyama Andō Clan Fortified Residence ruins =

Castle ruins in Akita, Japan

Coordinates: 40°09′58″N 140°07′24″E

Hiyama Castle
- 檜山城
- Noshiro, Akita Prefecture, Japan
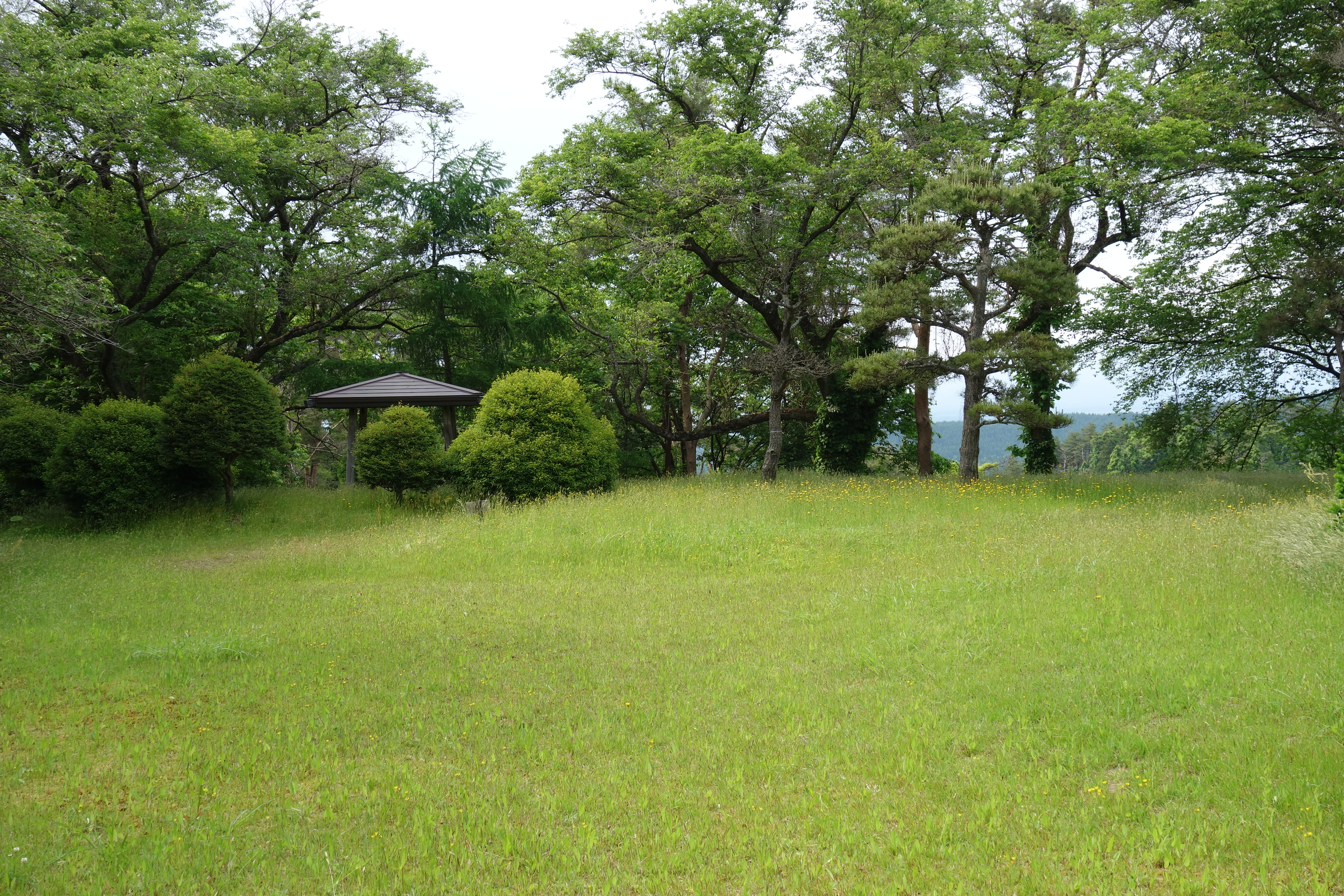
- site of Inner Bailey of Hiyama castle

Site information
- Type: yamashiro-style Japanese castle
- Open to the public: yes
- Condition: ruins

Location
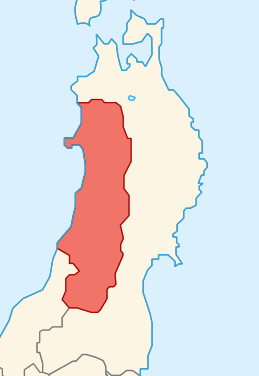

Site history
- Built by: Andō (Akita) clan
- In use: Sengoku period
- Demolished: 1620

Hiyama Castle (檜山城, Hiyama-jō) is a Sengoku period Japanese castle located in what is now part of the city of Noshiro, Akita Prefecture, in the Tōhoku region of Japan. The site of Hiyama Castle proper, the outlying Ōdate (大館跡), and Chausu (茶臼館跡) fortifications and the ruins of the temple of Kokusei-ji (国清寺跡) were collectively designated a National Historic Site of Japan in 1979.

== Background ==
Hiyama Castle is located approximately five kilometers southeast from the center of Noshiro city, on the summit of the 150 meter Mount Kiriyama, in the northern part of former Dewa Province. The location is at the mouth of the Yoneshiro River.

The precise date of the construction of Hiyama Castle is not known, but it was completed during the life of Andō Tadasue (d.1511), the chieftain of the Hiyama Andō clan. The Andō were possibly descendants of the indigenous Emishi people who populated the Tōhoku region prior to the arrival of the Yamato Japanese in the late Nara period. The Andō were a maritime clan who controlled the northern Sea of Japan coastline of Japan, including southern Ezo (Hokkaido), and who engaged in trade and fishing. Under the Kamakura shogunate and into the Nanbokuchō period, the clan enjoyed virtual autonomy in their domains, trading with mainland Asia through Tosaminato port in what is now Aomori Prefecture and from the 14th century at Tsuchizaki Port in what is now the city of Akita. However, in the 15th century, the Andō came under attack by the Nanbu clan based at Sannohe Castle and was forced to retreat from Tosaminoto Port to Hokkaido. Despite numerous counterattacks, the Andō were unable to recover Tosaminato, but a branch of the clan called the "Minato Andō" held out at Tsuchizaki. In the middle of the 15th century, the Minato Andō asked the main branch of the clan to relocate from Hokkaido to Dewa Province, and under Andō Masasue (d.1488), they began Hiyama Castle near Noshiro, becoming the "Hiyama Andō". The two branches of the clan co-existed for a century.

The two branches of the clan united under Andō Chikasue (1539-1587). Andō Chikasue rebuilt a pre-existing fortification at Wakimoto from 1577, and used this as his seat, changing his surname to "Akita". However, after his death, the former retainers of the Minato Andō rebelled with the assistance of the Nanbu clan and seized Hiyama Castle. Chikasue's son, Akita Sanesue suppressed the rebellion over a period of six months. After many vicissitudes, the Akita clan continued to the end of the Tokugawa shogunate as daimyō of Miharu Domain in what is now Fukushima Prefecture. In his place, the shogunate transferred the Satake clan from Hitachi Province. The Satake built Kubota Castle as their seat, and Hiyama Castle was abolished in 1620.

== Structure ==
Hiyama Castle is located on a right-angle shaped ridge. The inner bailey is round-shaped with a diameter of 50 meters, with the second and third enclosures spread out in a line on the ridge. The third enclosure has dimensions of 100 by 20 meters, an din one corner was a fortified gate serving as the entry to the castle. Small enclosures surround the main three enclosures on all sides. with many dry moats.

The total size of the castle is about 1,500 by 500 meters, making it one of the largest mountain castles in northeastern Japan.

A number of outlying fortifications were also constructed, including the Ōdate and Chausudate, to guard the attack from Ugo kaidō highway connecting the area with Hirosaki to the north. Nothing remains of the castle except for one gate preserved at a Buddhist temple near the castle. The Noshiro City Board of Education conducted comprehensive excavations of the castle and its jōkamachi from 2016

The site is located approximately 17 minutes on foot from JR East Ou Main Line Higashi-Noshiro Station.

== See also ==
- List of Historic Sites of Japan (Akita)

== Literature ==
- Schmorleitz, Morton S. (1974). Castles in Japan. Tokyo: Charles E. Tuttle Co. pp. 144–145. ISBN 0-8048-1102-4.
- Motoo, Hinago (1986). Japanese Castles. Tokyo: Kodansha. p. 200 pages. ISBN 0-87011-766-1.
- Mitchelhill, Jennifer (2004). Castles of the Samurai: Power and Beauty. Tokyo: Kodansha. p. 112 pages. ISBN 4-7700-2954-3.
- Turnbull, Stephen (2003). Japanese Castles 1540-1640. Osprey Publishing. p. 64 pages. ISBN 1-84176-429-9.
