= Akita =

Akita (秋田; autumn ricefield) is a Japanese name and may refer to:

== Places ==
- Akita Prefecture, region in northeastern Japan
  - Akita (city), capital city of the prefecture
  - Akita Station, railway station in the city of Akita
  - Port of Akita, seaport on the Sea of Japan coast in the city of Akita
- Akita Domain, also known as Kubota Domain, feudal domain in Edo period Japan
- Akita, Kumamoto, former town in southwestern Japan
- 8182 Akita, main-belt asteroid

== People ==
- Akita clan, Japanese samurai clan of northern Honshū
- Akita (surname), people with the surname

== Art, entertainment, and media ==
- Akita (Ninjago), character in the animated series Ninjago

== Other uses ==
- Akita (dog breed), large spitz breed from the mountainous regions of northern Japan
