= Matsudaira Yoritaka =

Matsudaira Yoritaka may refer to:

- Matsudaira Yoritaka (Shishido)
- Matsudaira Yoritaka (Takamatsu), successor of Matsudaira Yoritake

== See also ==
- Shishido Domain
- Takamatsu Domain
