= Miharu Castle =

- 三春城
- Miharu, Fukushima Prefecture, Japan
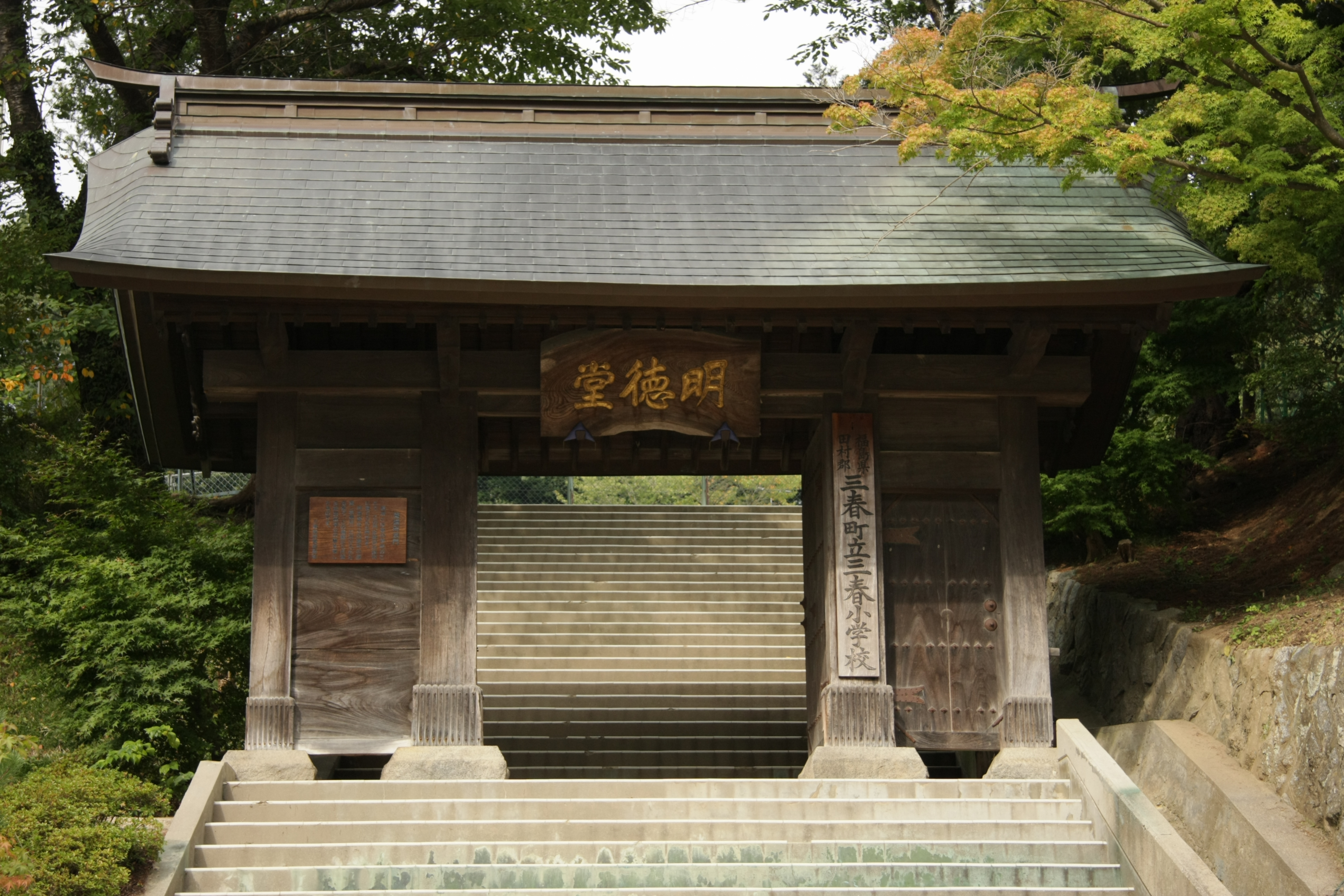
- surviving gate of Miharu Castle

Site information
- Type: yamashiro-style Japanese castle
- Open to the public: yes
- Condition: Ruins

Location
- Coordinates: 37°26′31.89″N 140°29′46.47″E

Site history
- Built: c.1504
- Built by: Tamura clan
- In use: Sengoku-Edo period
- Demolished: 1871

Miharu Castle (三春城, Miharu-jō) is a hilltop-style Japanese castle located in the town of Miharu, Tamura District, Fukushima Prefecture, in the southern Tōhoku region of Japan. It is also called Maizuru Castle (舞鶴城). Built in 1543, the castle and its surrounding land are maintained by the government of Japan as a public park. Constructed during the Sengoku period, the castle was occupied by a succession of daimyō of Miharu Domain under the Edo period Tokugawa shogunate. Today, the site is a public park, renowned for its sakura.

== Background ==
Miharu Castle is located on the 407-meter Shiroyama hill in the Abukuma Mountains, near the center of present-day Fukushima Prefecture. It commands a crossing point of the north–south route connecting Shirakawa with Kōriyama and the east–west route between Aizu-Wakamatsu and the Sōma territories on the eastern coast. The fortifications are situated on an L-shaped plateau, approximated 80 meters up the hillside. The upper enclosure housed the lord's residence, while the lower enclosure contained a three-story donjon. A ridge extends along the lower half of the hill, with secondary enclosures surrounding it on all sides. The castle area was compact.

== History ==
The exact date of the foundation of Miharu Castle is unknown, but it is believed to have been constructed by Tamura Yoshiaki at around 1504 AD. The Tamura clan claimed descent from the Heian period general Sakanoue Tamuramaro, who conquered this region from the Emishi, so the origins of the fortifications may date back even earlier. By the time of the Muromachi period, the Tamura clan had declined, and the Miharu area was divided among many competing small warlords. Although Tamura Yoshiaki aggressively expanded the Tamura holdings by attacking neighboring territories, his position was threatened by the growing power of the Date clan to the north, the Ashina clan to the west, and the Sōma clan to the east.

The Tamura clan chose to ally with Date clan. Yoshiaki's grandson, Tamura Kiyoaki, sent his daughter Megohime as a formal wife to Date Masamune. However, after Kiyoaki's death, the situation within the Tamura clan weakened. When Date Masamune submitted to Toyotomi Hideyoshi at the Siege of Odawara (1590), he did not allow any members of the Tamura clan to accompany him. As a result, their lands were declared forfeit and annexed by the Date. However, Date Masamune was forced to relinquish his holdings in what is now Fukushima by Hideyoshi the following year. Hideyoshi gave the territories to Gamō Ujisato, who embarked on a program to modernise the major castles of his domain with features such as stone walls and combined gates. Along with Nihonmatsu Castle and Inawashiro Castle, Miharu Castle was also modernised.

After the death of Ujisato in 1595, the territory passed to Uesugi Kagekatsu. The Uesugi clan lost the territory as a result of the Battle of Sekigahara and was transferred to Yonezawa by the new Tokugawa shogunate. In 1627, the shogunate created the 30,000 koku Miharu Domain for Katō Akitoshi, a younger son of Katō Yoshiaki. He was transferred to Nihonmatsu Domain the following year and was replaced by Matsushita Nagatsuna, formerly of Nihonmatsu, who ruled until dispossessed in 1644.

In 1645, the Akita clan was transferred from Shishido Domain in Hitachi Province, and the kokudaka of the domain was increased to 50,000 koku. The Akita ruled until the Meiji restoration. During the Boshin War, although Miharu Doman was a member of the Ōuetsu Reppan Dōmei, the castle was surrounded without a fight and surrendered to the Meiji government.

== Current situation ==
After the Meiji revolution, all the remaining structures of the castle were removed, except for the main gate of the han school. The shape of the earthen ramparts largely remains, and the area is now used as a public park, famous for its sakura trees in spring. The castle was listed as one of the Continued Top 100 Japanese Castles in 2017.

== Literature ==
- De Lange, William (2021). An Encyclopedia of Japanese Castles. Groningen: Toyo Press. pp. 600 pages. ISBN 978-9492722300.
- Schmorleitz, Morton S. (1974). Castles in Japan. Tokyo: Charles E. Tuttle Co. pp. 144–145. ISBN 0-8048-1102-4.
- Motoo, Hinago (1986). Japanese Castles. Tokyo: Kodansha. p. 200 pages. ISBN 0-87011-766-1.
- Mitchelhill, Jennifer (2004). Castles of the Samurai: Power and Beauty. Tokyo: Kodansha. p. 112 pages. ISBN 4-7700-2954-3.
- Turnbull, Stephen (2003). Japanese Castles 1540-1640. Osprey Publishing. p. 64 pages. ISBN 1-84176-429-9.
