= Matsudaira Nobunori =

Japanese samurai

Viscount Matsudaira Nobunori
- 松平容敬
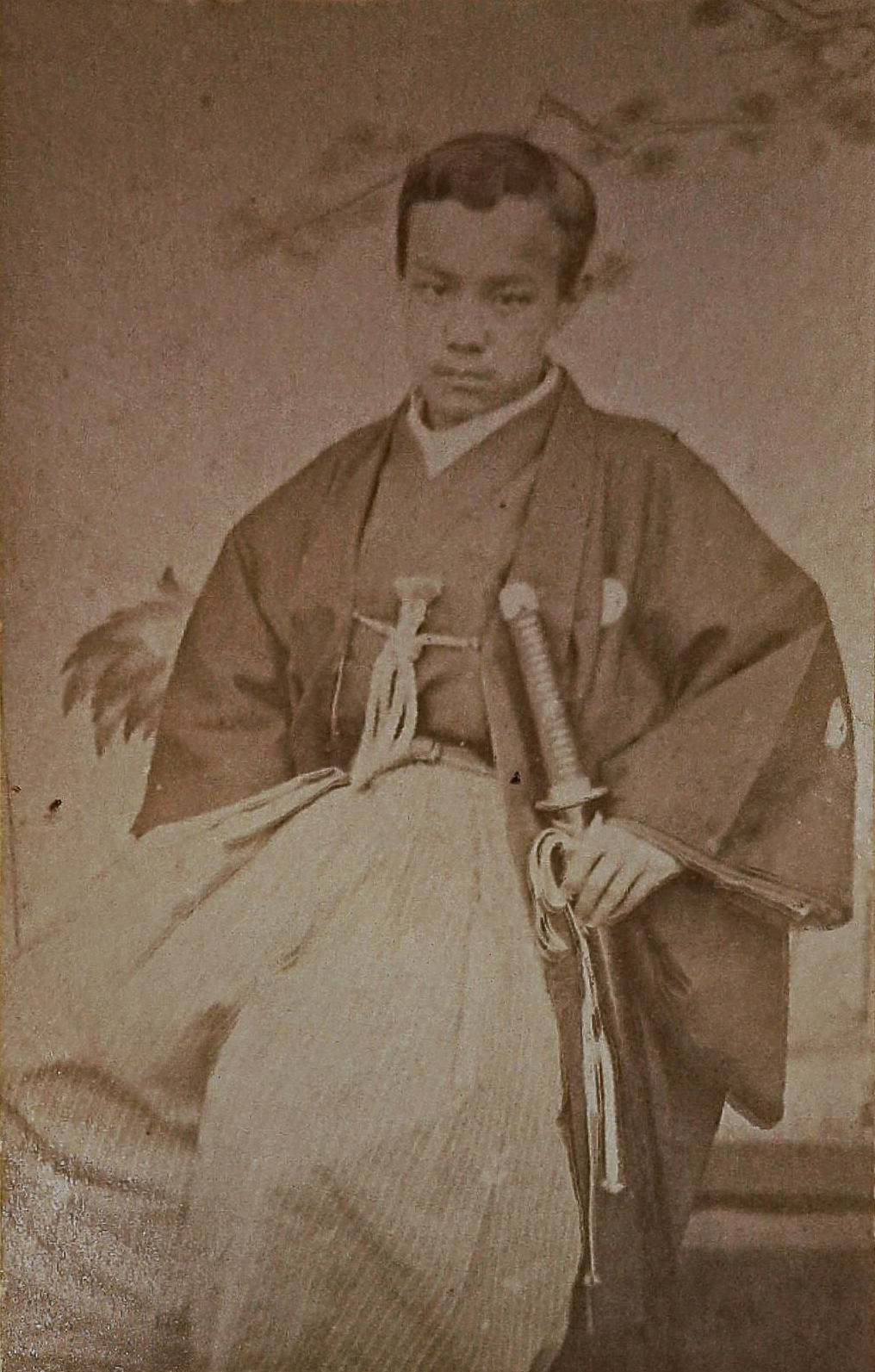

10th Daimyō of Aizu Domain
- In office 1868–1869
- Monarch: Emperor Meiji
- Preceded by: Matsudaira Katamori
- Succeeded by: none -

Personal details
- Born: December 1, 1855
- Died: June 3, 1891 (aged 35)
- Parent: Tokugawa Nariaki (father)

Viscount Matsudaira Nobunori (松平 喜徳; December 1, 1855 – June 3, 1891) was a Japanese samurai of the Bakumatsu period and the 10th (and final) daimyō of Aizu Domain.

== Biography ==
Nobunori was the 19th son of Tokugawa Nariaki of Mito Domain. He was initially named Akinori (昭則), but received a kanji from his older brother, Shogun Tokugawa Yoshinobu to become "Nobunori". He was adopted by Matsudaira Katamori in March 1867 as successor to Aizu Domain and received the courtesy title of Wakasa-no-kami and Jijū, and Court rank was Junior Fourth Rank, Lower Grade. In February 1868, Katamori officially retired making Nobunori daimyō. Following the defeat of Aizu forces at the Battle of Aizu in the Boshin War, the new Meiji government ordered Katamori and Nobunori to Tokyo, where in January 1869 they were stripped of their titles and offices and were placed under "permanent" house arrest. In November 1869, the chieftainship of the Aizu-Matsudaira clan was transferred to Katamori's infant son, Kataharu Matsudaira. In March 1870, Katamori and Nobunori were ordered to accompany the Aizu samurai to their new home of Tanami Domain in far northern Aomori Prefecture. They returned in August 1870 to Tokyo.

In August 1873, Matsudaira Moriyuki, the 22nd son of Tokugawa Nariaki, former daimyō of Moriyama Domain and imperial governor of Matsukawa, died. Nobuyuki dissolved his adoption tie to Katamori, which allowed him to posthumously be adopted by Moriyuki, becoming the 9th chieftain of the Moriyama-Matsudaira clan. On October 12, 1876, he departed Yokohama for France, where he studied until June 1879. On July 8, 1884, he was ennobled with the title of viscount (shishaku) under the new kazoku peerage system. He died on June 3, 1891, without heir. His title was inherited by Matsudaira Yorihira (1858-1929), the third son of Matsudaira Yoritaka, formerly of Shishido Domain. His grave is at the Yanaka Cemetery in Tokyo.
