= Kiyosue =

Kiyosue may refer to:

- Kiyosue Domain (清末藩, Kiyosue-han), domain of Japan
- Andō Kiyosue (安東 舜季) (1514–1553), Japanese daimyō
