= Daizen =

- Gender: Male

Origin
- Origin: Japanese
- Meaning: Different meanings depending on the kanji used

Daizen (written: 大然 or 大全) is a masculine Japanese given name. Notable people with the name include:

- Daizen Maeda (前田 大然; born 1997), Japanese footballer
- Daizen Shishido (宍戸 大全), Japanese stunt double

== Fictional characters ==
- Daizen Amami (天海 大善), a character in the light novel series Tokyo Ravens

== See also ==
- Daizen Takahiro (大善 尊太; born 1964), Japanese sumo wrestler
