= Shishido =

Shishido (宍戸) is a Japanese surname. Notable people with the surname include:

- Shishido Baiken (宍戸 梅軒), Japanese swordsman
- Daizen Shishido (宍戸 大全), Japanese stunt man
- Kavka Shishido (シシド・カフカ, born 1985), Japanese drummer and vocalist
- Kouji Shishido (宍戸 幸之, born 1972), Japanese wrestler
- Rumi Shishido (宍戸 留美, born 1973), Japanese actress, voice actress and singer
- Hiroki Shishido (宍戸 大樹, born 1977), Japanese welterweight shoot boxer

Fictional characters:

- Ryō Shishido (宍戸 亮), a character from The Prince of Tennis
- Tomi Shishido, a character from Marvel Comics Wolverine

== See also ==
- Shishido Domain
- Shishido Station
