= Matsudaira Yorinori =

Matsudaira Yorinori may refer to:

- Matsudaira Yorinori (Shishido) (1831–1864), a Japanese samurai of the late Edo period
- Matsudaira Yorinori (Takamatsu), a daimyo of the Takamatsu Domain
