= Akita (surname) =

Akita (written: 秋田/秋多, lit. 'Autumn ricefield' or 'Many autumns') is a Japanese surname. Notable people with the surname include:

- Hideyoshi Akita (秋田 英義; born 1974), Japanese footballer
- Kiyoshi Akita (秋田 清; 1881–1944), Japanese politician
- Masami Akita (秋田 昌美; born 1956), Japanese musician, also known as Merzbow
- Masateru Akita (秋田 政輝; born 1982), Japanese footballer
- Akita Sanesue (秋田 実季; 1576–1660), Japanese daimyō
- Akita Toshisue (秋田 俊季; 1598–1649), son of Sanesue
- Ujaku Akita (秋田 雨雀; 1883–1962), pseudonym of Tokuzō Akita (秋田 徳三), author and Esperantist
- Yutaka Akita (秋田 豊; born 1970), Japanese footballer
