= Kataharu Matsudaira =

Japanese daimyō

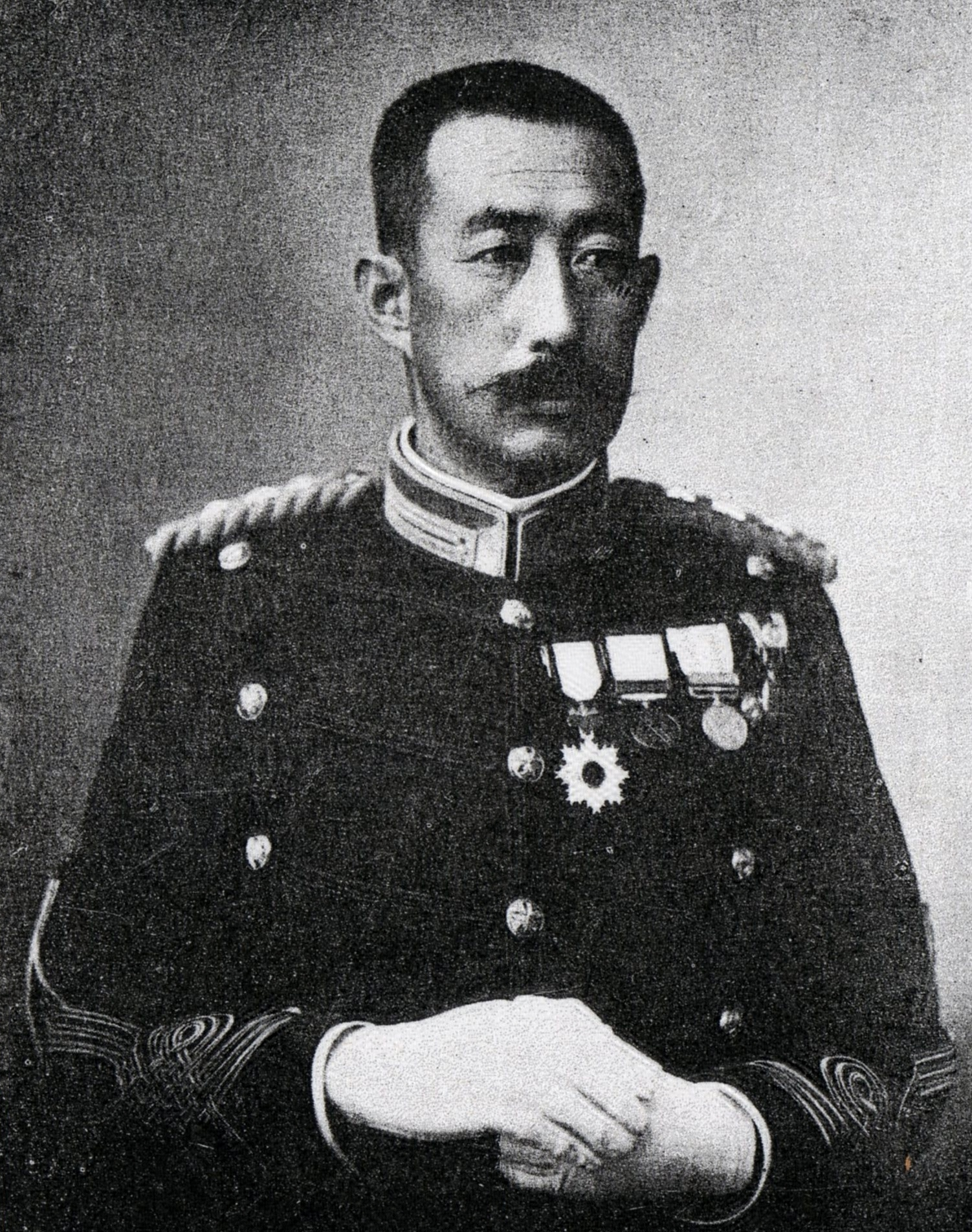
Matsudaira Kataharu

Viscount Kataharu Matsudaira (松平 容大, Matsudaira Kataharu; July 11, 1854 – June 11, 1910) was a Japanese man who served as the daimyō of Tonami han (the former Aizu han) in the early Meiji Era. Born the eldest son of Matsudaira Katamori, he succeeded Katamori's adopted son Nobunori in 1869. As the Meiji government had granted the former daimyō family of Aizu a 30,000 koku holding in northern Honshū, Kataharu became its daimyō, with Katamori technically in his "care."

Kataharu became a member of the new kazoku in the Meiji Era, as well as an officer in the Imperial Japanese Army.

Preceded by none	Daimyō of Tonami; 1869-1871	Succeeded by Domain abolished
Preceded by Matsudaira Nobunori	Aizu-Matsudaira Family Head; 1869-1910	Succeeded by Morio Matsudaira
