= Miharu (given name) =

- Gender: Female

Origin
- Origin: Japanese
- Meaning: Different meanings depending on the kanji used

Miharu (written: 三晴, 美春, 美晴, 海青 or 未遥) is a feminine Japanese given name. Notable people with the name include:

- Miharu Araki (荒城 三晴; born 1971), Japanese ice hockey player
- Miharu Arisawa (有沢 みはる; born 1989), member of the band BeForU
- Miharu Hanai (花井 美春; born 1998), Japanese voice actress and singer
- Miharu Imanishi (今西 美晴; born 1992), Japanese professional tennis player
- Miharu Kawashima (川嶋 美晴; born 2002), member of the idol group SKE48
- Miharu Kobayashi (小林 海青; born 1992), Japanese professional footballer
- Miharu Koshi (コシミハル; born 1960), Japanese popular musician
- Miharu Nara (奈良 未遥; born 1998), member of the idol group NGT48

== Fictional characters ==
- Miharu, a character from LBX Girls
- Miharu Amakase, a character from the Da Capo visual novel/manga/anime
- Miharu Fuyuki, a character from the visual novel Welcome to Pia Carrot
- Miharu Hirano, a character from the Tekken video game series
- Miharu Mihar, a character in the anime/manga Aki Sora
- Miharu Mikuni, a character in the anime/manga KissxSis
- Miharu Ogawa, a character in the web comic Red String
- Miharu Ohzora, a character in the anime/manga Stratos 4
- Miharu Rokujou, a character in the anime/manga Nabari no Ou
- Miharu Sena Kanaka, a character in the anime/manga "Girls Bravo"
- Miharu Shimizu, a character in the anime/manga Baka to Test to Shōkanjū
- Miharu Shirumaku, a character in the anime/manga Speed Grapher
- Miharu Takeshita, a character in the anime/manga B Gata H Kei
