= Andō Kiyosue =

Japanese daimyō

Andō kiyosue

Andō family head
- In office 1547–1553
- Preceded by: Andō Hirosue
- Succeeded by: Andō Chikasue

Personal details
- Born: 1514 Dewa Province, Japan
- Died: 1553 (aged 38–39) Dewa Province

Andō Kiyosue (安東 舜季; 1514 – September 18, 1553) was a Japanese daimyō of the Sengoku period, who was a traditional authority in the north half of Dewa Province and the south half of Yezo island. Kiyosue was the son of Andō Hirosue.

Kiyosue mediated the Ainu dispute with the Japanese who followed for about 100 years, and had their trade agreements concluded.
