= Morio Matsudaira =

Japanese admiral (1878–1944)

Viscount Morio Matsudaira
- 松平 保男
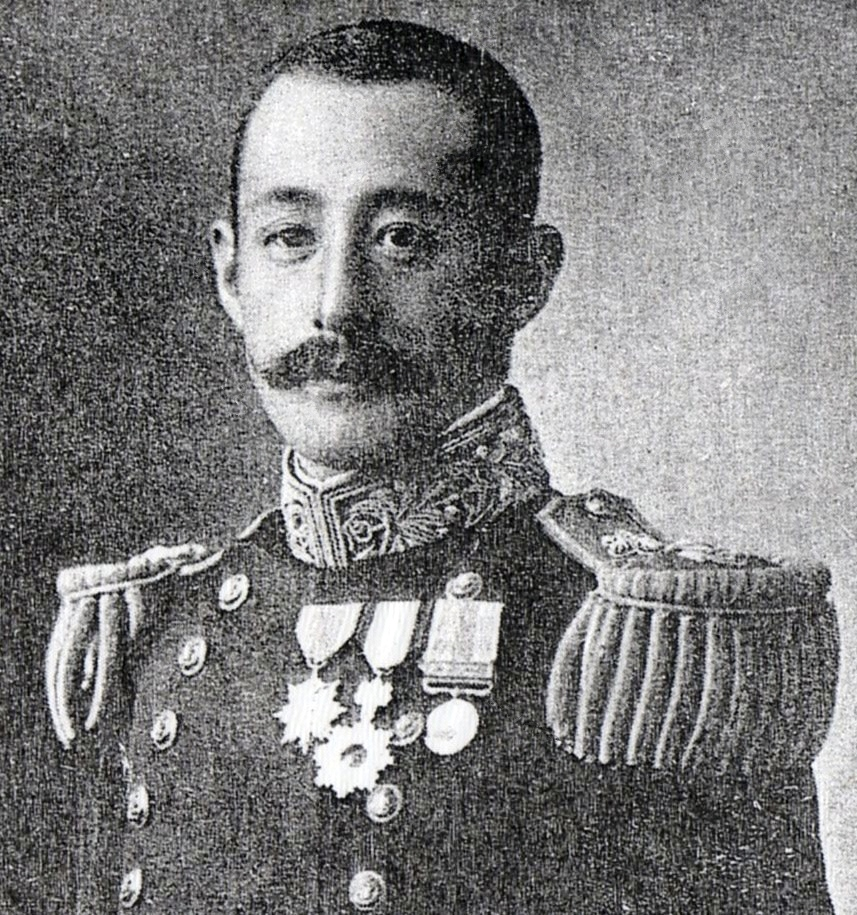
- Born: December 6, 1878; Tokyo, Japan
- Died: January 19, 1944 (aged 65)
- Relatives: Matsudaira Katamori (father)
- Military career
- Allegiance: Empire of Japan
- Branch: Imperial Japanese Navy
- Service years: 1900–1925
- Rank: Rear Admiral
- Commands: Ibuki, Settsu

Viscount Morio Matsudaira (松平 保男, Matsudaira Morio; 6 December 1878 – 19 January 1944) was an admiral in the Imperial Japanese Navy.

== Biography ==
Morio Matsudaira was the son of Matsudaira Katamori, the former daimyō of Aizu-Wakamatsu domain in what is now Fukushima prefecture. He was born at the Matsudaira's Tokyo residence in 1878.

Matsudaira graduated from the 28th class of the Imperial Japanese Naval Academy in 1900. He was ranked 86th in a class of 105 cadets. He was promoted to lieutenant in 1905 and assigned to the battleship Chin'en, followed by the cruisers Yakumo in 1906 and Akashi (where he was chief gunnery officer) in 1907. Matsudaira was promoted to lieutenant commander in 1910, which was also the same year that he succeeded to the head of the Aizu Matsudaira household. He inherited his brother's title of viscount (shishaku) under the kazoku peerage system.

In 1914, he was appointed chief gunnery officer on the battleship Kawachi, and served from 1915-1916 as executive officer on the cruiser Hashidate. Matsudaira was promoted to commander in 1916, and was assigned as aide-de-camp to Prince Fushimi Hiroyasu from December 1916-November 1918. On 10 November 1918, he was reassigned as executive officer on the battleship Yamashiro. Promoted to captain in 1920, he received his first command on 10 November 1922: the battlecruiser Ibuki. He was also captain of the Settsu in 1923. From 1923 onwards, he served in a number of staff positions. On 1 December 1925, he was promoted to rear admiral and entered the reserves two weeks later.

Matsudaira Morio's son-in-law was a grandson of Tokugawa Yoshinobu, named Hikaru Tokugawa. He was a naval officer and killed in World War II. Morio's niece, Setsuko, married Prince Chichibu.

Preceded by Kataharu Matsudaira	Aizu-Matsudaira Family Head; 1910–1944	Succeeded by Morisada Matsudaira
