= Miharu-koma =

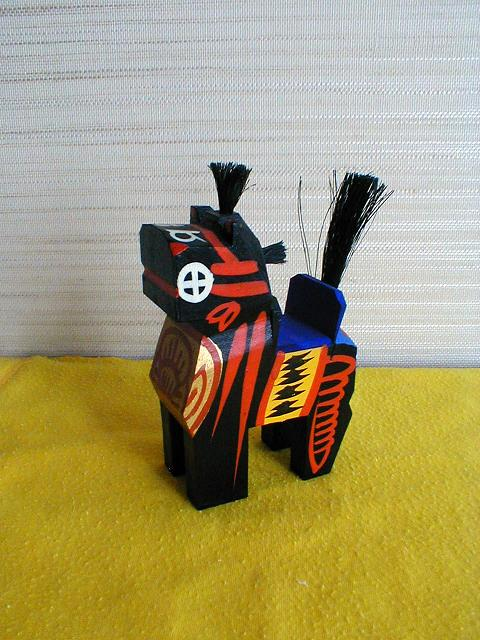
Miharu-koma

Miharu-koma (三春駒) (alt. Miharu-goma) are angular, brightly coloured, wooden toy horses produced as folk art in Miharu, Fukushima, Japan.

== Overview ==
Such toys have their origins in a legend concerning Sakanoue no Tamuramaro. According to the legend, he either received aid from a magical wooden horse or was able to win a battle due to the timely appearance of a herd of wild horses. Due to the original toys being carved from offcuts of Buddhist images, Miharu-koma have always had superstitions attached to them. Although commonly made of painted wood, they are sometimes constructed from straw or even paper. They are said to be able to carry messages to the gods on behalf of petitioners. Miharu-koma have existed in Japan for around 1,500 years.

The black koma represents the wish to be blessed with children or is a prayer for children’s health, while the white one is a wish for longevity and security in old age.
