= Morisada Matsudaira =

Japanese businessman

Morisada Matsudaira (松平 保定, Matsudaira Morisada; 1926 – 9 August 2011) was a Japanese banker who was active in historical preservation. He was the grandson of Matsudaira Katamori, and spent a fair amount of time in Aizu. After graduating from university, he worked for the Norinchukin Bank for 29 years. Morisada was approached by the Imperial Household Agency in the late 1980s, with a request to serve as an official at the mourning ceremony for Emperor Hirohito; simultaneously, they expressed a desire to install him as chief priest of Yasukuni Shrine. Morisada declined the Yasukuni appointment, as the shrine was built to enshrine the soldiers of the Imperial Japanese Army who died in the Boshin War and exclude those who fought against them, including men of the Aizu, Sendai, Nihonmatsu, and Morioka domains.

Morisada had one son, Morihisa Matsudaira.

== Notes ==
Preceded by Morio Matsudaira	Aizu-Matsudaira family head 1944–2011	Succeeded by Morihisa Matsudaira
