= Miharu Takizakura =

Ancient cherry tree in Fukushima, Japan

Coordinates: 37.4077°N 140.5001°E

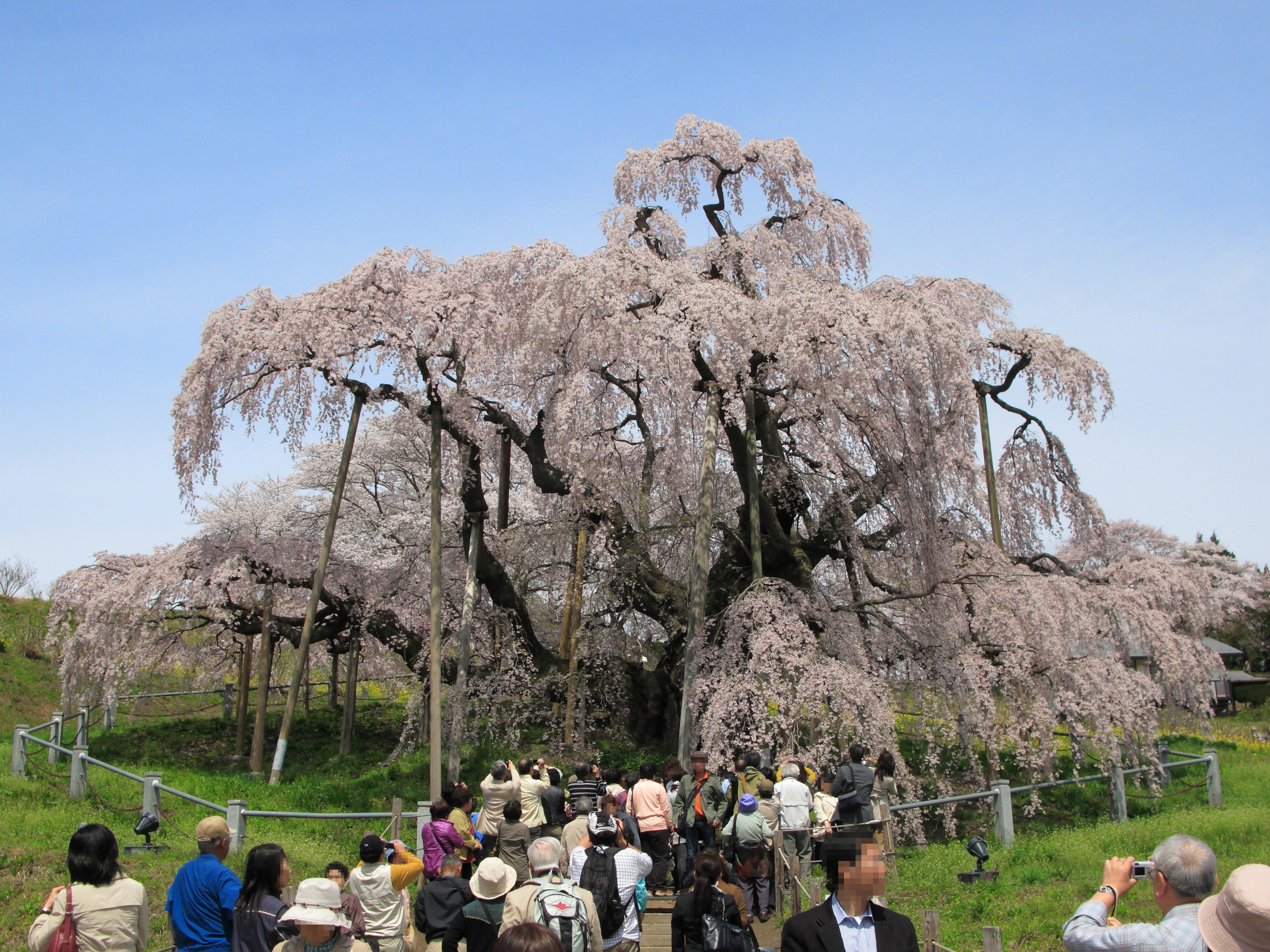
The Miharu Takizakura in 2009

The Miharu Takizakura (三春滝桜; lit. waterfall cherry tree of Miharu) is an ancient cherry tree in Miharu, Fukushima, in northern Japan. It is a weeping higan cherry (Prunus subhirtella var. pendula ‘Itosakura’. syn. Prunus spachiana ‘Pendula Rosea’. Benishidare-zakura in Japanese) and is over 1,000 years old.

It flowers in mid to late April, and its light pink flowers spread in all directions from the branches, like a waterfall.

== Description ==
The tree is 12 metres (39 ft) high, the trunk circumference is 9.5 metres (31 ft), the east-west spread is 22 metres (72 ft), and the north-south spread is 18 metres (59 ft).

It is classified as one of the five great cherry trees of Japan (日本五大桜) and one of the three giant cherry trees of Japan (日本三巨大桜). It was designated a national treasure in 1922. Polls frequently rank it as the number one tree in all of Japan.

Around 300,000 people visit the Miharu Takizakura each year, making it an important source of income for Miharu, which is otherwise a farming community of around 17,000 people.

== Damage ==
The tree suffered some damage from heavy snow in January 2005, breaking several branches; residents brushed off the snow and built wooden supports to limit damage. It was unharmed by the 2011 Tōhoku earthquake and tsunami, but in the immediate aftermath of the Fukushima nuclear disaster the number of visitors decreased markedly.

While in 2011, the number of visitors was less than half the usual amount, in 2012, visitors returned to the tree.

== Propagation and descendants ==
Because this tree is a celebrated and historically significant one, its saplings and seeds have been sent across Japan and to other countries, where its descendant trees have been planted. For example, between 1974 and 1995, Kichizaemon Yaginuma distributed 4,700 saplings throughout Japan. Later, saplings and seeds were also sent to countries such as Austria, Bhutan, Hungary, Poland, South Korea, Taiwan, United Kingdom, and United States.

Around 1960, a survey was conducted by Denjūrō Kimesawa and Kichizaemon’s father, Kichishirō, to investigate the Miharu Takizakura and the surrounding weeping cherry trees. As a result, they discovered that within a 10-kilometer radius of the Takizakura, there were more than 420 weeping cherry trees with a trunk circumference of over one meter. These trees were found to spread outward from the Takizakura in concentric circles, with thinner trunks and fewer numbers the farther they were from the center. These trees were also determined to be descendants of the Takizakura.

== See also ==
- Miharu, Fukushima
- Miharu Dam
