= Matsudaira Yorinori (Shishido) =

Japanese samurai (1831–1864)

- Born: 1831
- Died: 1864 (aged 32–33)

Matsudaira Yorinori (松平 頼徳; 1831–1864) was a Japanese samurai of the late Edo period. He was the ninth feudal lord of the Shishido han (Hitachi Province) and the daimyō of 10,000 koku. His father, Matsudaira Yoritaka, was the eighth feudal lord of the Shishido han.

== Career ==
Yorinori succeeded his father, Yoritaka, who retired as the lord in 1846. With the help of his father, Yorinori was appointed to act as an assistant to Tokugawa Yoshiatsu, the elder brother of Tokugawa Yoshinobu. Tokugawa Yoshiatsu was the tenth feudal lord of the Mito Domain, which was the Shishido han's head family.

In 1864, Yorinori was ordered by the Shogunate to proceed to Mito, in order to deal with the Mito Rebellion, whose members had proposed the policy with the motto of "Revere the emperor, expel the barbarians" (尊王攘夷, Sonnō jōi). The Tengu Party, which led the Mito Rebellion, was dissatisfied with the foreign policy of the Shogunate. However, Yorinori failed to deal with the Tengu Party's threat due to his sympathy for their cause: Yorinori was a believer of Tokugawa Nariaki, a proponent of radical imperialism.

Despite his initial unwillingness, Yorinori opposed the Ichikawa Party, the aristocratic family group in the Mito Domain, and the enemy of the Tengu Party. He was subsequently blamed by the Shogunate for his opposition to the Ichikawa Party. Yorinori intended to appeal to the Shogunate by providing a reasoned defense for his actions, but—without being afforded the opportunity to defend himself—he was instead commanded to commit seppuku (ritualistic suicide) for disgracefully serving as "the enemy leader". This series of events was orchestrated by Ichikawa Sanzaemon (市川 三左衛門), who held the majority of power in Mito.

Yorinori died by seppuku at the age of 35 on October 5, 1864 (Japanese calendar date), and most of his vassals were executed. In addition, Yorinori's father, Yoritaka, was deprived of feudal tenure, made to forfeit his residence in Edo, and was placed in custody of the Uzen Shinjo han, thereafter tainting the Shishido han.

In 1868, the new government of the Meiji Emperor ordered the restoration of the Shishido han, and Yorinori's father, Yoritaka (who had since retired), was restored as the feudal lord (10th feudal lord) of the Shishido han; the following year he was named han-chiji (domainal governor) by Imperial order.

In July 1880, Yorinori's younger brother, Matsudaira Yoriyasu (松平 頼安; 1856–1940) was handed down the birthright from his father, and Yoriyasu was awarded the title of viscount on July 8, 1884.

== Family ==
Yorinori's younger sister was Matsudaira Kō (松平 高; 1858–1923). She married Nagai Iwanojō (1845–1907) who was the supreme court judge, and was the adopted son of Nagai Naoyuki. Yorinori's niece was Nagai Natsu (永井 なつ; 1876–1939), who was the grandmother of Yukio Mishima.

== In popular fiction ==
Yorinori's younger brother, Matsudaira Yoriyasu, has been the model of the main characters in the several short stories of Yukio Mishima. These stories' titles are Shinkan (神官) "Shinto priesthood", Koushoku (好色) "Lust", and Kaibutsu (怪物) "Monster".

== See also ==
- Mitogaku
- Shinto
- Tokugawa Nariaki

== Notes ==
Preceded by Matsudaira Yoritaka	Shishido-Matsudaira clan 1846–1864	Succeeded by Matsudaira Yoritaka
