= Moriyama Domain =

Feudal domain in Edo period Japan

Matsukawa Domain (1870–1871) 松川藩 Moriyama Domain (1700–1870) 守山藩
- Domain of Japan
- 1700–1871
- Capital: Moriyama jin’ya 37°19′49.76″N 140°24′37.26″E (1700–1870); Matsukawa jin'ya (1870–1871)
- Government
  - Type: Daimyō
- Historical era: Edo period
  - Nukada Domain: 1661
  - Established: 1700
  - Matsudaira: 1700
- 1868
  - Disestablished: 1871
  - Matsukawa Domain: 1871
Preceded by	Succeeded by
Mutsu Province	Matsukawa Prefecture
- Today part of: Fukushima Prefecture; Ibaraki Prefecture

Moriyama Domain (守山藩, Moriyama-han) was a feudal domain under the Tokugawa shogunate of Edo period Japan, located in southern Mutsu Province in what is now part of the modern-day city of Kōriyama, Fukushima. It was established by a cadet branch of the Tokugawa clan of Mito. A relatively small domain, it had a kokudaka of 20,000 koku.

== History ==
In 1661, Tokugawa Yorifusa of Mito Domain created Nukada Domain, 20,000 koku subsidiary holding for his fourth son, Matsudaira Yorimoto in what is now part of the city of Naka, Ibaraki. He ruled Nukata until his death in 1693, and was succeeded by his son, Matsudaira Yorisada. By order of Shōgun Tokugawa Tsunayoshi, Yorisada was granted a fief of 20,000 koku in Moriyama in Tamura District in Mutsu Province in 1700. His original holdings reverted to Mito Domain. Although the daimyō of Moriyama were not subject to sankin-kōtai since they were direct relatives of the ruling Tokugawa, they preferred to reside permanently at the clan's Edo residence in Koishikawa and to leave administration of the domain in the hands of overseers appointed by the parent house at Mito Domain. During the Bakumatsu period, many of the samurai of Moriyama supported the Mito Rebellion of 1864, and the clan was punished by the shogunate. When the forces of the anti-Tokugawa Satchō Alliance advanced north during the Boshin War, the domain surrendered without a fight.

Following the Meiji restoration, the seat was of the domain was transferred to what is now Ōarai, Ibaraki and it was briefly renamed Matsukawa Domain from 1868 until the abolition of the han system in 1871. Matsudaira Yoriyuki, the last daimyō of Moriyama, was succeeded by Matsudaira Nobunori, the adopted former lord of Aizu who had cut his familial ties to Matsudaira Katamori as imperial governor of Matsukawa..

== Holdings at the end of the Edo period ==
As with most domains in the han system, Moriyama Domain consisted of several discontinuous territories calculated to provide the assigned kokudaka, based on periodic cadastral surveys and projected agricultural yields.

- Mutsu Province (Iwaki)
  - 31 villages in Tamura District
- Hitachi Province
  - 4 villages in Ibaraki District
  - 19 villages in Kashima District
  - 11 villages in Namegata District

== List of daimyō ==
#	Name	Tenure	Courtesy title	Court Rank	kokudaka
Matsudaira (Mito) clan, 1700-1871 (Shinpan)
1	Matsudaira Yorisada (松平頼貞)	1700-1738	Wakasa-no-kami (若狭守)	Junior 4th Rank, Lower Grade (従四位下)	20,000 koku
2	Matsudaira Yorihiro (松平頼寛)	1738-1763	Daigaku-no-kami (大学頭)	Junior 4th Rank, Lower Grade (従四位下)	20,000 koku
3	Matsudaira Yoriakira (松平頼亮)	1763-1801	Daigaku-no-kami (大学頭)	Junior 4th Rank, Lower Grade (従四位下)	20,000 koku
4	Matsudaira Yoriyoshi (松平頼慎)	1801-1830	Daigaku-no-kami (大学頭)	Junior 4th Rank, Lower Grade (従四位下)	20,000 koku
5	Matsudaira Yorinobu (松平頼誠)	1830-1862	Daigaku-no-kami (大学頭)	Junior 4th Rank, Lower Grade (従四位下)	20,000 koku
6	Matsudaira Yorinori (松平頼升)	1862-1869	Daigaku-no-kami (大学頭)	Junior 4th Rank, Lower Grade (従四位下)	20,000 koku
7	Matsudaira Yoriyuki (松平頼之)	1869-1871	-none-	Junior 5th Rank (従四位)	20,000 koku

=== Matsudaira Yorimoto ===
Matsudaira Yorimoto (松平頼元; September 1, 1629 - June 1, 1693) was the 1st daimyō of Nukada Domain in Hitachi Province. He was the fourth son of Tokugawa Yorifusa of Mito Domain and was thus a grandson of Shōgun Tokugawa Ieyasu. His elder brother was the Mito Mitsukuni. who created the 20,000 koku domain for him in 1661. He was a noted waka poet and master of the Japanese tea ceremony. His wife was a daughter of Ogasawara Tadazane. He died in 1693.

=== Matsudaira Yorisada ===
Matsudaira Yorisada (松平頼貞; February 21, 1664 - September 9, 1744) was the 2nd and final daimyō of Nukada Domain in Hitachi Province and the 1st daimyō of Moriyama Domain in Mutsu Province. He was the eldest son of Matsudaira Yorimoto. He became daimyō of Nukada on his father's death in 1693. In 1700, he moved his seat to Moriyama. He retired in 1743 and died in 1744.

=== Matsudaira Yorihiro ===
Matsudaira Yorihiro (松平頼寛; March 23, 1703 - December 2, 1763) was the 2nd daimyō of Moriyama Domain. He was the third son of Matsudaira Yorisada. He became daimyō on the retirement of his father in 1738. His wife was a daughter of Matsudaiara Yoritaka of Takasu Domain. To improve the domain's finances, he ordered the planting of 500,000 Chinese lacquer trees throughout the domain. He was a disciple of the noted Confucianism scholar Ogyū Sorai and built a han school to propagate his teachings. he was later called upon for advice in reforming the finances of Mito Domain. He died in 1763.

=== Matsudaira Yoriakira ===
Matsudaira Yoriakira (松平頼亮; May 18, 1744 - October 15, 1801) was the 3rd daimyō of Moriyama Domain. He was the third son of Matsudaira Yorihiro. He became daimyō on the death of his father in 1763. He implemented a number of fiscal reform measures, including laws to prevent peasants from doing to other domains even on a temporary basis, and cracking down on gambling and prostitution.

=== Matsudaira Yoriyoshi ===
Matsudaira Yoriyoshi (松平頼慎; July 20, 1770 - August 30, 1830) was the 4th daimyō of Moriyama Domain. He was the second son of Matsudaira Yoriakira. He became daimyō on the death of his father in 1801. He attempted to create new industries, including indigo, safflower oil and sericulture and sponsored a system of loans with no interest payments for the first ten years. He ruled until his death in 30.

=== Matsudaira Yorinobu ===
Matsudaira Yorinobu (松平頼誠; February 15, 1803 - September 6, 1862) was the 5th daimyō of Moriyama Domain. He was the eldest son of Matsudaira Yoriyoshi and his mother was a daughter of Tokugawa Harumori of Mito Domain. He became daimyō on the death of his father in 1830. Due to the severe financial situation of the domain, he was forced to borrow 4500 ryo and to increase taxes on the peasants and merchants of the domain. This led to frequent peasant revolts and petitions for debt relief. He ruled until his death in 1862.

=== Matsudaira Yorinori ===
Matsudaira Yorinori (松平頼升; July 29, 1832 - October 25, 1872) was the 6th daimyō of Moriyama Domain. He was the sixth son of Matsudaira Yorinobu and his mother was a daughter of Matsudaira Yorihisa of Hitachi-Fuchū Domain. He became daimyō on the death of his father in 1862. From 1864, the Mito rebellion created severe disturbances within the domain. Although he was a signatory to the Ōuetsu Reppan Dōmei, he refused demands to supply troops, and instead surrendered without a battle to the forces of the Satchō Alliance. He participated in the attack on Nihonmatsu Domain and was awarded with 9300 koku in 1869 and was named imperial governor by the new Meiji government, He retired due to ill-health a few months later. He died in 1872.

=== Matsudaira Yoriyuki ===
Matsudaira Yoriyuki (松平頼之; July 11, 1858 - August 11, 1873) was the 7th (and final) daimyō of Moriyama Domain. He was the 22nd son of Tokugawa Nariaki of Mito Domain and thus was a half-brother to Shogun Tokugawa Yorinobu, He was adopted as heir to the childless Matsudaira Yorinori in 1869, and the domain was transferred to Matsukawa in Hitachi Province by the Meiji government the same year. He died in 1873, only one year after his adopted father, and the chieftainship of the Moriyama-Matsudaira clan went to Matsudaira Nobunori of Aizu Domain.

== See also ==
- List of Han
