= Miharu, Fukushima =

Miharu 三春町
- Town
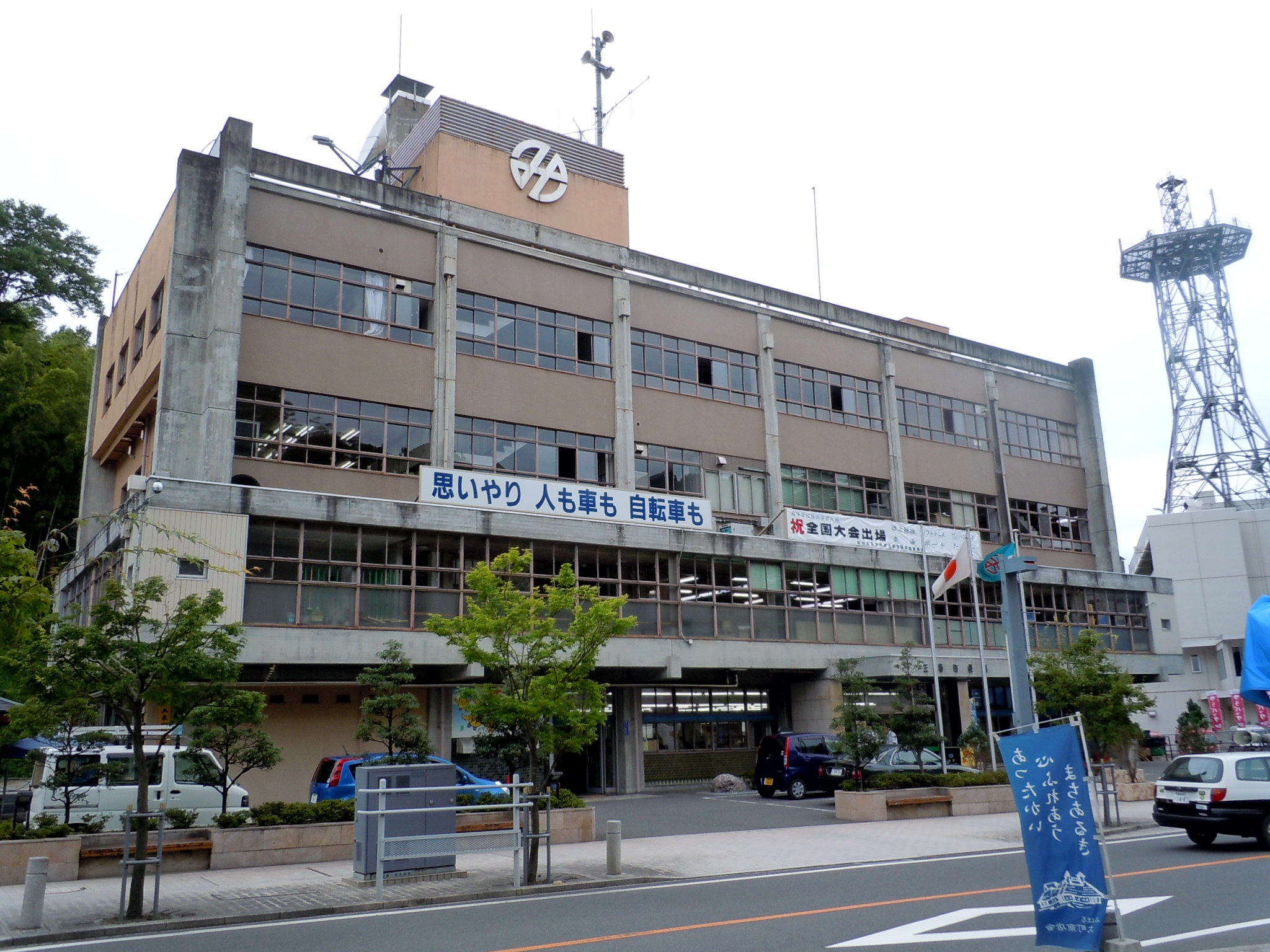
- Miharu Town Hall

- Flag Seal

- Location of Miharu in Fukushima Prefecture

- Coordinates: 37°26′27.6″N 140°29′33.3″E
- Country: Japan
- Region: Tōhoku
- Prefecture: Fukushima
- District: Tamura

Area
  - Total: 72.76 km^{2} (28.09 sq mi)

Population (March 2020)
  - Total: 17,471
  - Density: 240.1/km^{2} (621.9/sq mi)
- Time zone: UTC+9 (Japan Standard Time)
- Tree: Weeping Cherry blossom
- Flower: Rhododendron
- Bird: Japanese bush warbler
- Phone number: 0247-62-2111
- Address: Omachi 1－2, Miharu Town, Tamura District, Fukushima Prefecture 963-7796
- Website: Official website

Miharu (三春町, Miharu-machi) is a town located in Fukushima Prefecture, Japan. As of 1 March 2020, the town had an estimated population of 17,471 in 6348 households, and a population density of 240 persons per km^{2}. The total area of the town was 72.76 square kilometres (28.09 sq mi).

== Geography ==
Miharu is located in Tamura District in north-central Fukushima prefecture. The town is located in an hilly region of the Abukuma Mountains, with peaks of 300–500 meters.

- Lakes: Miharu Dam

=== Neighboring municipalities ===
- Fukushima Prefecture
  - Kōriyama
  - Motomiya
  - Nihonmatsu
  - Tamura

== Demographics ==
Per Japanese census data, the population of Miharu has declined modestly from 1960 levels.

Historical population
Year	Pop.	±%
1960	22,485	—
1970	19,898	−11.5%
1980	19,047	−4.3%
1990	19,205	+0.8%
2000	19,976	+4.0%
2010	18,191	−8.9%
2020	17,018	−6.4%

== Climate ==
Miharu has a humid continental climate (Köppen Cfa) characterized by mild summers and cold winters with heavy snowfall. The average annual temperature in Miharu is 11.3 °C. The average annual rainfall is 1282 mm with September as the wettest month. The temperatures are highest on average in August, at around 24.2 °C, and lowest in January, at around -0.3 °C.

== History ==
The area of present-day Miharu was part of ancient Mutsu Province. During the Edo period, the area was the castle town of Miharu Domain, a 50,000 koku han ruled by the Akita clan from 1645 until the Meiji Restoration. It was subsequently organized as part of Nakadōri region of Iwaki Province.

Miharu town was established with the formation of the modern municipalities system on April 1, 1889. On April 1, 1955, Miharu annexed the neighboring villages of Ogisawa, Nakazuma, Nakago, Sawaishi and Kurita, all from Tamura District.

== Economy ==
The economy of Miharu is primarily agricultural, with some chemical and light manufacturing.

== Education ==
Miharu has six public elementary schools and one public junior high school operated by the town government, and one public high school operated by the Fukushima Board of Education.

- Fukushima Prefectural Tamura High School

== Transportation ==
=== Railway ===
JR East - Ban'etsu East Line

- Miharu

=== Highway ===
- E49 Ban-etsu Expressway
- National Route 288

== International relations ==
- Rice Lake, Wisconsin, United States, since August 21, 1987

== Noted people from Miharu ==
- Kōno Hironaka, politician
- Junko Tabei, mountaineer

== Local attractions ==
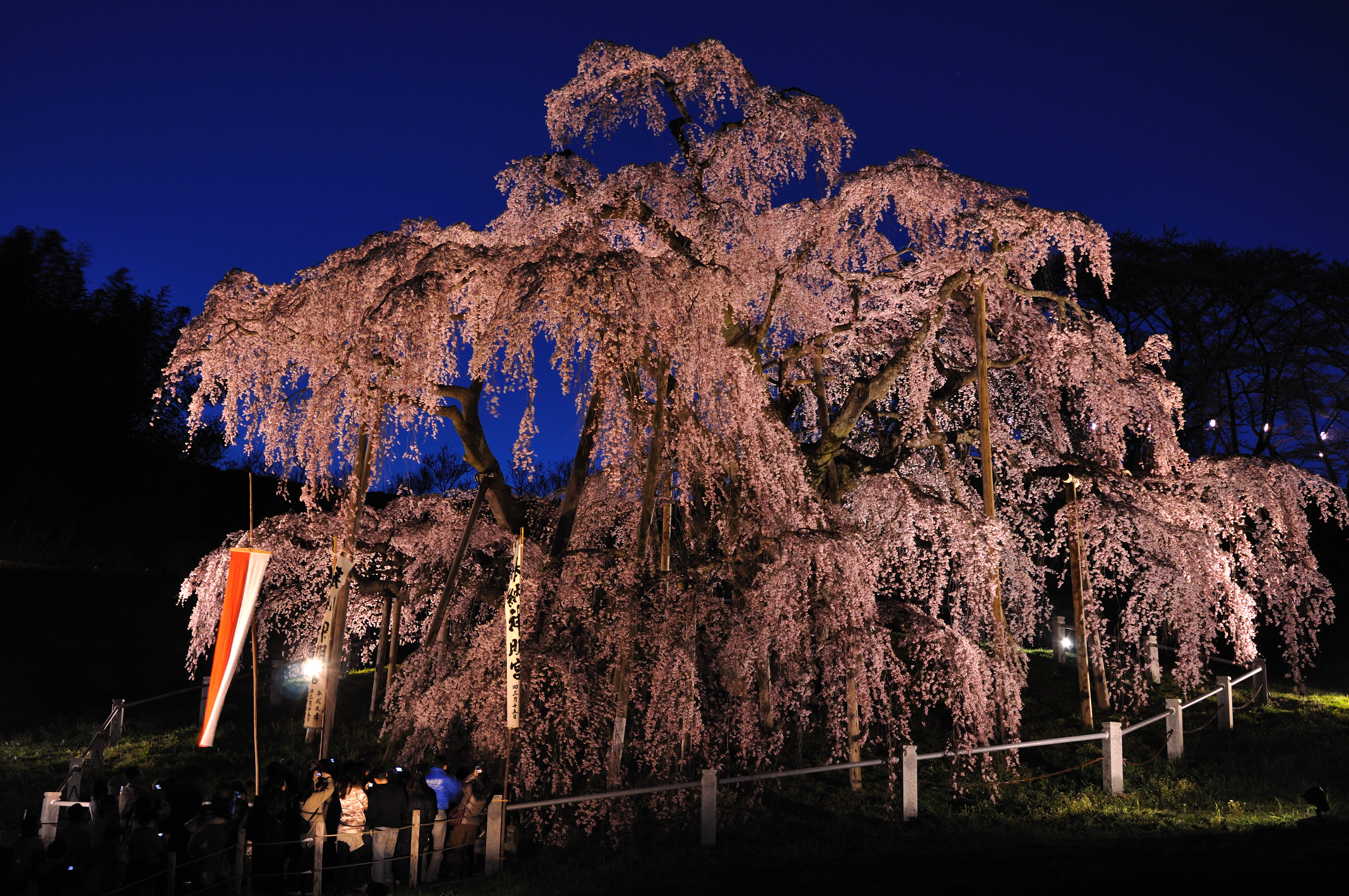
The Takizakura tree at night

- Site of Miharu Castle
- Miharu Daijingu Shrine (三春大神宮)
- Takizakura Park - The name "Miharu" in Japanese means three springs. In most parts of Japan, plum, peach, and cherry trees blossom at different times, but in Miharu, they blossom almost simultaneously. Miharu is home of the Takizakura, or "waterfall cherry tree", is over 1,000 years old and brings tourists from all over Japan to see it in the springtime. It is registered as a living national treasure by the Japanese government.

=== Tradition and culture ===
- Miharu-goma
