= Miharu Dam =

Dam in Fukushima Prefecture, Japan

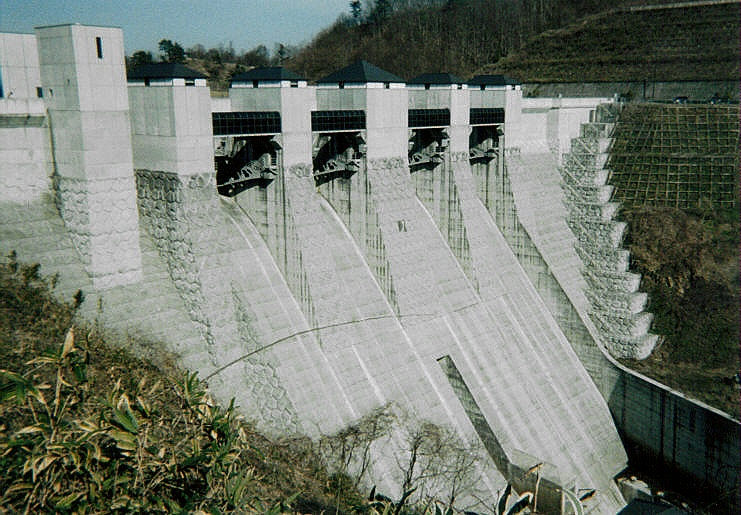
- Miharu Dam
- Interactive map of Miharu Dam
- Official name: 三春ダム
- Location: Fukushima Prefecture, Japan.
- Coordinates: 37°24′6″N 140°28′27″E
- Construction began: 1972
- Opening date: 1997

Dam and spillways
- Impounds: Otakine River
- Height: 65 meters
- Length: 174 meters

Reservoir
- Creates: Lake Sakura
- Catchment area: 226.0 sq.km.
- Surface area: 290 hectares

Miharu Dam (三春ダム) is a concrete gravity dam on the Ōtakine River, a branch of the Abukuma River in the town of Miharu, Fukushima in the Tōhoku region of Japan. The dam was completed in 1997.

== Geography ==
The Miharu Dam is a multipurpose dam directly controlled by the Japanese Ministry of Land, Infrastructure, Transport and Tourism. It is aimed at flood control on the middle reaches of the Abukuma River and to provide a content source of water for central Fukushima Prefecture, including the city of Koriyama. It was initially called Ōtakine Dam, but was renamed Miharu Dam at the request of the local inhabitants. Also, in consideration of the landscape, the dam body was decorated like a stone wall, reflecting Miharu's status as a castle town. The reservoir created by the dam is called Lake Sakura, and has become a local tourist destination. There is a museum (Miharu Dam Museum) located next to the dam.

== See also ==
- Miharu, Fukushima
- Miharu Takizakura
