= Andō Chikasue =

Japanese daimyō

- 安東 愛季

Andō family head
- In office 1553–1587
- Preceded by: Andō Kiyosue
- Succeeded by: Akita Sanesue

Personal details
- Born: 1539 Hiyama Castle, Hiyama District, Dewa Province, Japan
- Died: 1587 (aged 47–48) Yodokawa, Senboku District, Dewa Province
- Resting place: Ryuonin, Miharu, Tamura District, Mutsu Province
- Nickname: Big Dipper

Military service
- Battles/wars: Minato Disturbance

Andō Chikasue (安東 愛季; 1539 – October 2, 1587) was a Japanese daimyō of the Sengoku period, who was a powerful figure in the north half of Dewa Province. Chikasue was the son of Andō Kiyosue.

Chikasue united the Hiyama Ando and Minato Ando families who had been divided. He obtained some mines, and he ruled the Akita port directly. He changed the name of the clan from Andō to Akita and was extolled as being like the Big Dipper in the northern sky. However, he died of sickness immediately before the unification of the north half of Dewa Province.

He was succeeded by his son Akita Sanesue.
