= Miharu Kobayashi =

Japanese footballer (born 1992)

Personal information
- Date of birth: 12 October 1992 (age 34)
- Place of birth: Yokohama, Japan
- Height: 1.57 m (5 ft 2 in)
- Position: Defender

Team information
- Current team: Tokyo Verdy Beleza
- Number: 2

Senior career*
Years	Team	Apps	(Gls)
2013–2017	Tokyo Verdy Beleza	0	(0)
2018–2023	Nojima Stella Kanagawa Sagamihara	24	(1)
2023–2024	Napoli	24	(1)
2024–	Tokyo Verdy Beleza	2	(0)
- * Club domestic league appearances and goals as of 17 September 2023

Miharu Kobayashi (born 12 October 1992) is a Japanese professional footballer who plays as a defender for Tokyo Verdy Beleza. She also played for Italian Serie A club Napoli and for WE League club Nojima Stella Kanagawa Sagamihara.

== Club career ==
Kobayashi made her WE League debut on 12 September 2021.

On 16 September 2023 she signed for newly-promoted Serie A club Napoli.
