= Matsushita clan =

Japanese clan

Matsushita 松下氏
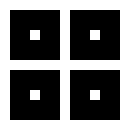
- Mon of the Matsushita clan
- Home province: Mikawa Province
- Parent house: Imagawa clan
- Founder: Saijo Takanaga
- Founding year: late-Kamakura period

The Matsushita clan (松下氏, Matsushita-shi) was a samurai family originating from Matsushita Township in Bikai District, Mikawa Province (modern-day Masuzuka District, Toyota City, Aichi Prefecture, on the west bank of the Yahagi River). The clan is believed to have descended from the Imagawa clan (今川氏). While not a dominant force in Japanese history, the Matsushita clan was known for producing capable samurai and military leaders, particularly during the Sengoku period. The clan played a significant role as retainers to larger feudal lords and left a lasting cultural and military legacy.

== Origins and Lineage ==
The name "Matsushita" is believed to have been adopted by Saijo Takanaga, a member of the monastic community of Mount Hiei. Takanaga left the religious life, settled in Matsushita-go in Bikai District at the end of the Kamakura period, and took the name Matsushita. The clan's relocation to this region marked the beginning of their established presence in Mikawa Province.

== Sengoku Period and Military Prominence ==
The Matsushita clan gained prominence during the Sengoku period (1467–1615), a time of widespread conflict and social upheaval in Japan. One of the most notable figures of the clan was Matsushita no Tsuna, who served Toyotomi Hideyoshi during his youth. Tsuna later became a daimyō, ruling Toe Kuno Castle in Mikawa Province with a domain of 16,000 koku. His strategic importance in regional conflicts made the Matsushita clan a recognized name during the Azuchi-Momoyama period.

Throughout history, several other members of the Matsushita clan served under the Tokugawa shogunate. Matsushita Kiyokage, the stepfather of famed Tokugawa vassal Ii Naomasa, and Matsushita Yasutsuna were notable retainers. Kiyokage's descendants served as the patriarchs of the Echigo Yoita clan. Another branch descended from Tsugizuna, Tsuna's younger brother, served in the Tosa Yamauchi family, continuing their influence in the Tosa domain (modern-day Kochi Prefecture).

Additionally, a branch of the Matsushita family, descended from Matsushita Naganori, served as retainers to the Ogino Yamanaka Domain in present-day Kanagawa Prefecture. Matsushita Yunobu, from this line, became a notable figure at the end of the Edo period. His descendants remain in Atsugi City.

== Legacy ==
Although the Matsushita clan never achieved the heights of Japan's most powerful samurai families, they played a pivotal role in regional politics, military strategy, and cultural heritage. The family's legacy continues through various branches and descendants who have carried on the Matsushita name into the modern era.

Today, the Matsushita name is most famously associated with Konosuke Matsushita, the founder of Panasonic. However, there is no confirmed direct connection between the industrialist's family and the historic Matsushita samurai clan.
