= Matsudaira Yoritaka (Shishido) =

Japanese daimyō

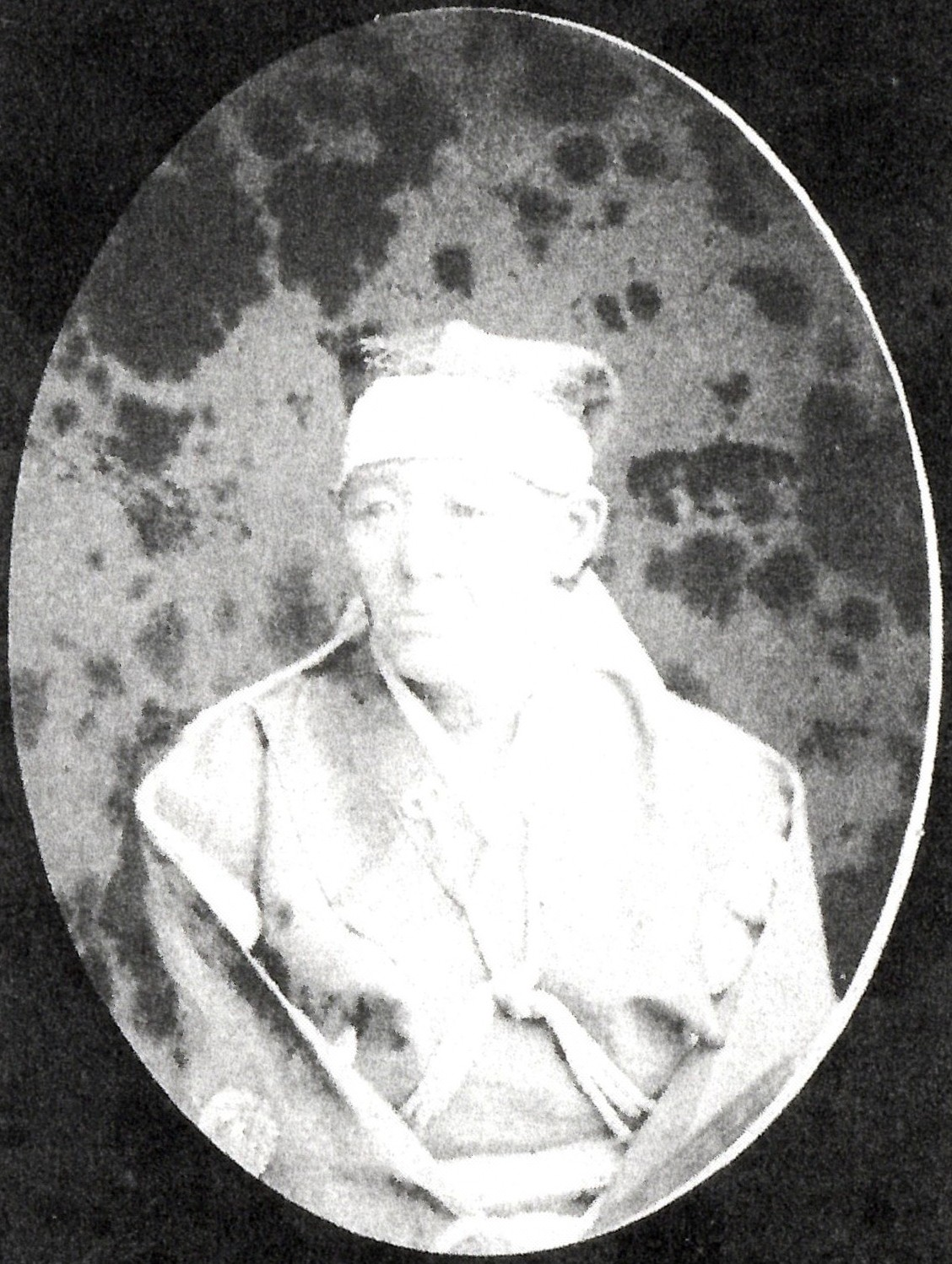
Matsudaira Yoritaka

Viscount Matsudaira Yoritaka (松平 頼位; March 17, 1810 – December 17, 1886) was a Japanese daimyō of the late Edo period who served as daimyō of Shishido han. Retiring early, he was succeeded by his son Matsudaira Yorinori, but Yoritaka returned to headship following Yorinori's death in 1864. Though the domain was abolished following its involvement in the chaos of the Tengu-tō (天狗党) "Tengu Party" revolt of 1864, the new Satsuma-Chōshu centered government of the Meiji Emperor forgave Shishido and allowed Yoritaka to retake his former holdings.

Becoming han-chiji (domainal governor) by Imperial order in 1869, Yoritaka remained in that position until the abolition of the domains in 1871. After that, he became a Shinto priest and was famed as a prolific writer. His son Matsudaira Yoriyasu (松平 頼安; 1856–1940) succeeded him as family head in 1880; under the new system of nobility, Yoriyasu became a viscount (shishaku 子爵). Yoritaka's granddaughter Natsu (the daughter of Matsudaira Kō (松平 高; 1858–1923) and Nagai Iwanojō (永井 岩之丞; 1845–1907), son of the famous Nagai Naoyuki), is famous as the grandmother of Mishima Yukio.

Yoritaka died in December 1886, at age 76.

== Ancestry ==
Ancestors of Matsudaira Yoritaka (Shishido)

16. Matsudaira Yoritoyo, 3rd daimyō of Takamatsu (1680–1735)
8. Tokugawa Munetaka, 4th daimyō of Mito (1705–1730)
17. Yuasa Satoryō-in
4. Tokugawa Munemoto, 5th daimyō of Mito (1728–1766)
18. Tokugawa Yoshizane (1685–1709)
9. Tokugawa Miyohime (1708–1746)
19. Takatsukasa Yaehime (1689–1746)
2. Matsudaira Yorisuke, 5th daimyō of Shishido (1756–1830)
5. Nakazawa
1. Matsudaira Yoritaka, 8th & 10th daimyō of Shishido
3. Taguchi Namie

Preceded by Matsudaira Yorikata	Shishido-Matsudaira clan 1839–1846	Succeeded by Matsudaira Yorinori
Preceded by Matsudaira Yorinori	Shishido-Matsudaira clan 1868–1871	Succeeded by none (domain abolished)
