= Daizen Shishido =

Japanese stunt double

Daizen Shishido (宍戸大全, Shishido Daizen) (real name Shishido Kunihiro) is a Japanese stunt double. He has appeared in many television shows, including regular appearances on long-running series such as Mito Kōmon, Ōoka Echizen, the Hissatsu series and Abarenbo Shogun.

He was also the stunt double for Raizo Ichikawa in all eight "Shinobi no Mono" films from 1963-67.

After graduating from Nippon Sport Science University, he went to work for Daiei, then Toei, before become a free-lancer in 1970.

In 1999 Shishido won the Distinguished Service Award at the Kyoto Film Festival.

Among his film appearances are Ninpō Chūshingura (from a Futaro Yamada story) and Zenigata Heiji (the 1967 Toei film).

In addition to working as a stunt double, he led a group of actors who performed the stunts and the chanbara swordfight scenes in jidaigeki films. Furthermore, Shishido appeared in a speaking role in an episode of Mito Komon.
