= Shishido Domain =

Feudal domain in Edo-period Japan

Shishido Domain 宍戸藩
- under Tokugawa shogunate Japan
- 1602–1871
- Capital: Shishido jin'ya
  - Type: Daimyō
- Historical era: Edo period
  - Established: 1602
  - Disestablished: 1871
- Today part of: part of Ibaraki Prefecture

Hitachi-Shishido Domain (常陸宍戸藩, Hitachi-Shishido-han) was a feudal domain under the Tokugawa shogunate of Edo period Japan, located in Hitachi Province (modern-day Ibaraki Prefecture), Japan. It was centered on Shishido Jin'ya in what is now part of the city of Kasama, Ibaraki. It was ruled for much of its history by a junior branch of the Mito Tokugawa clan.

== History ==
When the new Tokugawa shogunate moved the powerful Satake clan north into Dewa Province, part of the lands they were given were occupied by the Akita clan. Shishido Domain was created for Akita Sanesue in 1602 out of part of the former Satake lands in Hitachi Province. He was replaced by his son Akita Toshisue in 1630, who was subsequently transferred to Miharu Domain in Mutsu Province and the domain reverted to direct control by the shogunate.

Shishido Domain was revived in 1682 for Matsudaira Yorio, the 7th son of Tokugawa Yorifusa of Mito Domain by order of Tokugawa Mitsukuni. The domain played a leading role in the pro-sonno joi Tengu Party Revolt of the early Bakumatsu period under the rule of Matsudaira Yorinori in 1864. After the failure of the revolt, Yorinori and many of the samurai of the domain were put to death and the domain officially suppressed. However, after the Meiji restoration, Shishido Domain was restored under Matsudaira Yoritaka, who was recalled from retirement and who served until the abolition of the han system in 1871.

The site of Shishido Jin'ya is now an Inari Shrine. However, the large main gate of the jin’ya survives, and is projected as an Ibaraki Prefectural Important Cultural Property.

The domain had a total population of 6398 people in 978 households per a census in 1869.

== Holdings at the end of the Edo period ==
Unlike most domains in the han system, Shishido Domain consisted of a single continuous territory which was calculated to provide its assigned kokudaka, based on periodic cadastral surveys and projected agricultural yields.

- Hitachi Province
  - 27 villages in Ibaraki District

== List of daimyō ==
#	Name	Tenure	Courtesy title	Court Rank	kokudaka
Akita clan (tozama) 1602–1645
1	Akita Sanesue (秋田 実季)	1602–1630	Akitajō-no-suke (秋田城介)	Lower 5th (従五位下)	50,000 koku
2	Akita Toshisue (秋田 俊季)	1631–1645	Izu-no-kami (伊豆守)	Lower 5th (従五位下)	50,000 koku
	tenryō	1645–1682			
Mito-Matsudaira clan (Shinpan) 1682–1864
1	Matsudaira Yori (松平 頼雄)	1682–1697	Oi-no-kami (大炊頭)	Lower 5th (従五位下)	10,000 koku
2	Matsudaira Yorimichi (細川 興栄)	1697–1721	Chikugo-no-kami (筑後守)	Lower 5th (従五位下)	10,000 koku
3	Matsudaira Torimichi (松平 頼慶)	1721–1742	Oi-no-kami (大炊頭)	Lower 5th (従五位下)	10,000 koku
4	Matsudaira Yorita (松平 頼多)	1742–1766	Oi-no-kami (大炊頭)	Lower 5th (従五位下)	10,000 koku
5	Matsudaira Yorisuke (松平 頼救)	1766–1802	Oi-no-kami (大炊頭)	Lower 5th (従五位下)	10,000 koku
6	Matsudaira Yoriyuki (松平 頼敬)	1802–1807	Yugei-no-suke (靭負佐)	Lower 5th (従五位下)	10,000 koku
7	Matsudaira Yorikata (松平 頼筠)	1807–1839	Oi-no-kami (大炊頭)	Lower 5th (従五位下)	10,000 koku
8	Matsudaira Yoritaka (松平 頼位)	1839–1846	Chikara-no-kami (主税頭)	Lower 5th (従五位下)	10,000 koku
9	Matsudaira Yoritnori (松平 頼徳)	1846–1864	Oi-no-kami (大炊頭)	Lower 5th (従五位下)	10,000 koku
	tenryō	1864–1868			
Mito-Matsudaira clan (shinpan) 1868–1871
10	Matsudaira Yoritaka (松平 頼位)	1868–1871	Chikara-no-kami (主税頭)	Lower 5th (従五位下)	10,000 koku
