= Miharu Domain =

Edo-period Japanese feudal domain

Miharu Domain 三春藩
- under Tokugawa shogunate Japan
- 1627–1871
- Capital: Miharu Castle
- Area
  - Coordinates: 37°26′31.89″N 140°29′46.47″E
  - Type: Daimyō
- Historical era: Edo period
  - Split from Aizu Domain: 1627
  - Katō: 1627
  - Matsushita: 1628
  - Akita: 1644
  - Disestablished: 1871
- Today part of: part of Fukushma Prefecture

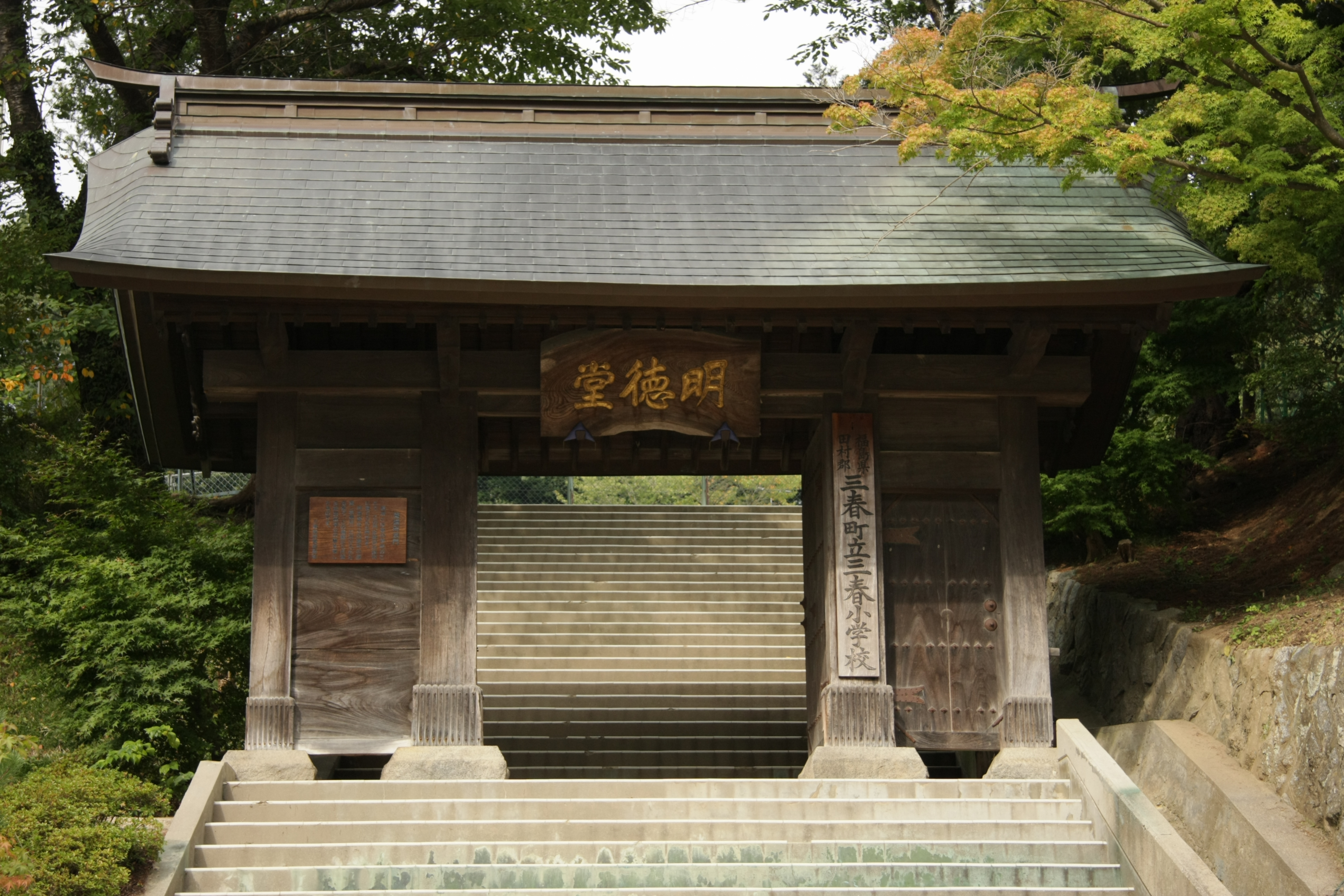
surviving gate of Miharu Castle

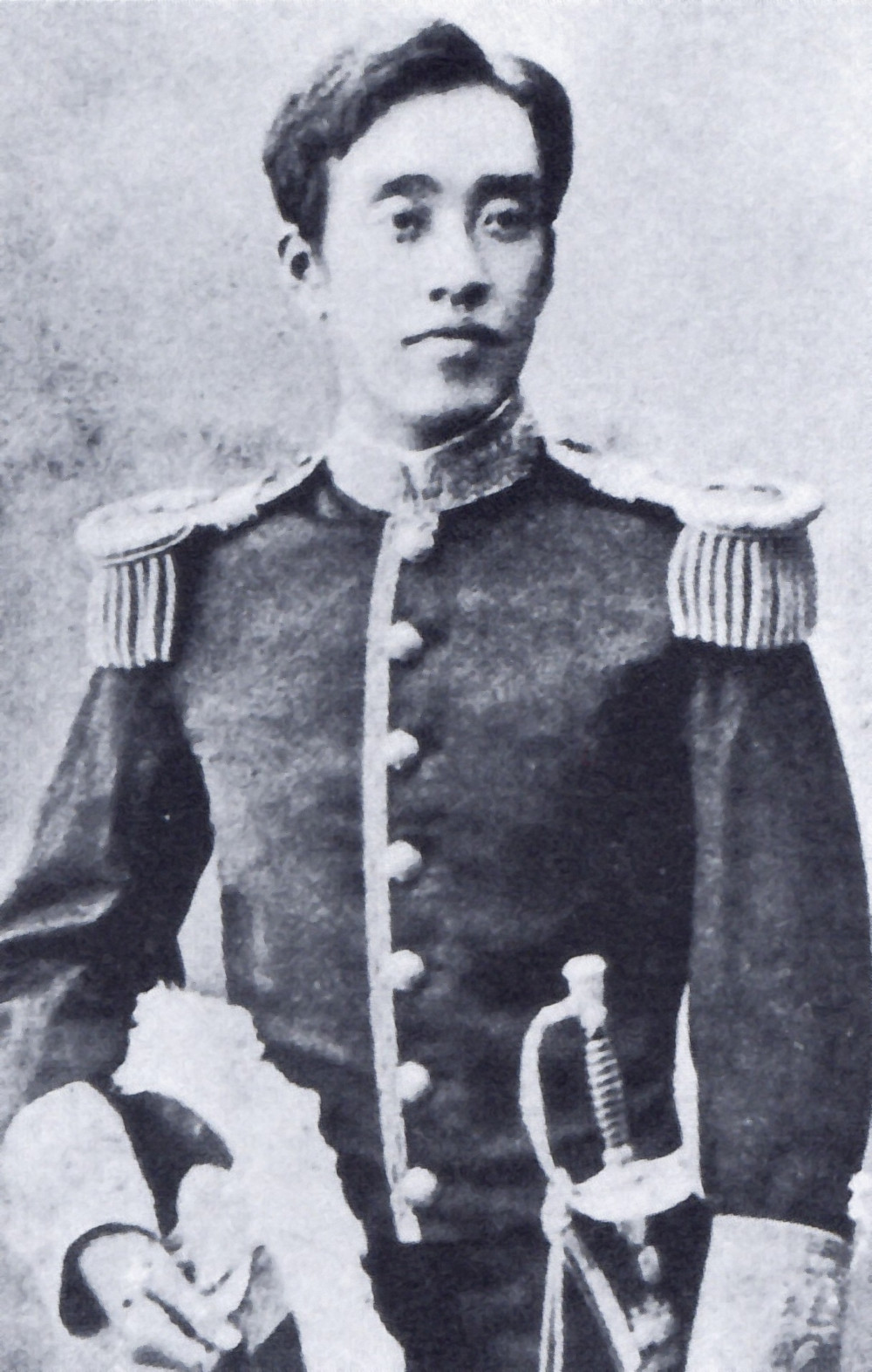
Akita Akisue, final daimyō of Miharu

Miharu Domain (三春藩, Miharu-han) was a feudal domain under the Tokugawa shogunate of Edo period Japan. It was based at Miharu Castle in southern Mutsu Province in what is now part of modern-day Miharu, Fukushima. It was ruled for most of its history by the Akita clan.

== History ==
During the Sengoku period, the area around Miharu was controlled by the Tamura clan. Once they were dispossessed by Toyotomi Hideyoshi, the area became part of the holdings of Gamō Ujisato of Aizu. Following the establishment of the Tokugawa shogunate, the Gamo were relocated to Iyo Province in Shikoku, and Aizu was given to Katō Yoshiaki, who split off the Miharu area as a separate 30,000 koku domain for his younger son Katō Akitoki in 1627. However, due to mismanagement, the peasants in the domain rose in revolt the following year, and the Kato clan was replaced by Matsushita Nagatsuna from the Nihonmatsu Domain in 1628. He was in turn demoted in 1644 to hatamoto status, and Miharu Domain was reassigned to Akita Toshisue, formerly of Shishido Domain from Hitachi Province. The Akita clan continued to rule Miharu until the Meiji Restoration.

At the time of the Restoration, the 11th daimyō, Akita Akisue was still underage. The domain joined the Ōuetsu Reppan Dōmei during the Boshin War. However, when ordered to dispatch forces to Shōnai Domain on April 1, 1868, Miharu Domain refused, citing its small size and military weakness. On July 26, 1868, through the intercession of Kōno Hironaka, a local samurai in the service of the imperial forces, Miharu Domain switched sides to the Satchō Alliance. This defection caught the defenders of Nihonmatsu Domain and Sendai Domain by surprise and hastened the ending of the war. Akita Akisue remained a domain governor until the abolition of the han system in July 1871.

The domain had a total population of 17,034 men and 16,156 women in 7252 households, of which 904 households were classified as samurai, per a census in 1869.

== Holdings at the end of the Edo period ==
Unlike most domains in the han system, which consisted of several discontinuous territories calculated to provide the assigned kokudaka, based on periodic cadastral surveys and projected agricultural yields, Miharu Domain was a compact and continuous holding.

- Mutsu Province (Iwaki)
  - 83 villages in Tamura District
  - 2 villages in Shineha/Shimeha District

== List of daimyō ==
#	Name	Tenure	Courtesy title	Court Rank	Kokudaka
Katō clan (tozama) 1627–1628
1	Katō Akitoshi (加藤明利)	1627–1628	Minbu-taifu (民部大輔)	Junior 5th Rank, Lower Grade (従五位下)	30,000 koku
Matsushita clan (tozama) 1628–1644
1	Matsushita Nagatsuna (松下長綱)	1628–1644	Iwami-no-kami (石見守)	Junior 5th Rank, Lower Grade (従五位下)	30,000 koku
Akita clan (tozama ->fudai) 1644–1871
1	Akita Toshisue (秋田俊季)	1645–1649	Kawachi-no-kami (河内守)	Junior 5th Rank, Lower Grade (従五位下)	50,000 koku
2	Akita Morisue (秋田盛季)	1649–1676	Awa-no-kami (安房守)	Junior 5th Rank, Lower Grade (従五位下)	50,000 koku
3	Akita Terusue (秋田輝季)	1676–1715	Shinano-no-kami (信濃守)	Junior 5th Rank, Lower Grade (従五位下)	50,000 koku
4	Akita Yorisue (秋田頼季)	1715–1743	Shinano-no-kami (信濃守)	Junior 5th Rank, Lower Grade (従五位下)	50,000 koku
5	Akita Nobusue (秋田治季)	1743–1751	Kawachi-no-kami (河内守)	Junior 5th Rank, Lower Grade (従五位下)	50,000 koku
6	Akita Sadasue (秋田定季)	1751–1757	Mondo-no-shō (主水正)	Junior 5th Rank, Lower Grade (従五位下)	50,000 koku
7	Akita Yoshisue (秋田倩季)	1757–1797	Shinano-no-kami (信濃守)	Junior 5th Rank, Lower Grade (従五位下)	50,000 koku
8	Akita Nagasue (秋田長季)	1797–1803	Kawachi-no-kami (河内守)	Junior 5th Rank, Lower Grade (従五位下)	50,000 koku
9	Akita Norisue (秋田孝季)	1803–1832	Yamashiro-no-kami (山城守)	Junior 4h Rank, Lower Grade (従四位下)	50,000 koku
10	Akita Tomosue (秋田肥季)	1832–1865	Awa-no-kami (安房守)	Junior 5th Rank, Lower Grade (従五位下)	50,000 koku
11	Akita Akisue (秋田映季)	1855–1871	Shinano-no-kami (信濃守)	Junior 5th Rank, Lower Grade (従五位下)	50,000 koku

=== Akita Toshisue ===
Akita Toshisue (秋田俊季, 1598 – February 14, 1649) was the second Akita daimyō of Shishido Domain, first daimyō of Miharu Domain and third hereditary chieftain of the Akita clan. His courtesy title was Kawachi-no-kami, and later Izu-no-kami. His court rank was Junior Fifth Rank, Lower Grade. He was the eldest son of Akita Sanesue, and fought as a soldier in the Tokugawa forces at the 1614 Siege of Osaka. His father was exiled to Izu Province in 1630 due to discontent with the policies of Shōgun Tokugawa Iemitsu, and Toshisue was appointed daimyō of Shishido Domain in 1631. In 1644, the Tokugawa shogunate ordered the Akita clan to relocate to Miharu Domain with an increase in kokudaka to 55,000 koku. Toshisue’s wife was a daughter of Matsudaira Nobuyoshi of Tsuchiura Domain. He died in 1649 while on duty at Osaka Castle and his grave is at the temple of Kōken-in in Miharu.

=== Akita Morisue ===
Akita Morisue (秋田盛季, 1620 – February 26, 1676) was the second daimyō of Miharu Domain and fourth hereditary chieftain of the Akita clan. His courtesy title was Awa-no-kami, and his court rank was Junior Fifth Rank, Lower Grade. He was the eldest son of Akita Toshisue, and became daimyō on his father's death in 1649. He reduced the kokudaka of the domain by giving 5,000 koku of the domain to his younger brother Hidehisa. Morisue’s wife was a daughter of Andō Shigenaga of Takasaki Domain. He died in 1676 and his grave is at the temple of Kōken-in in Miharu.

=== Akita Terusue ===
Akita Terusue (秋田輝季, 1649 – October 20, 1720) was the third daimyō of Miharu Domain and fifth hereditary chieftain of the Akita clan. His courtesy title was Shinano-no-kami, and his court rank was Junior Fifth Rank, Lower Grade. Terusue was the eldest son of Akita Morisue. His wife was a daughter of Sakai Tadanao of Obama Domain. He was received in formal audience by Shōgun Tokugawa Ietsuna in 1658, and became daimyō on his father's death in 1676. Terusue greatly improved the finances of the domain by sponsoring horse breeding as a local industry. He also achieved an elevation in the status of the domain from a tozama domain to a fudai domain. However, the death of his son and heir Norisue in 1715 greatly disturbed him, and he withdraw from all of the affairs of the domain, turning power over to a retainer, Araki Takamura. He died in 1720 and his designation of Araki's son as his successor resulted in an O-Ie Sōdō. His grave is at the temple of Kōken-in in Miharu.

=== Akita Yorisue ===
Akita Yorisue (秋田頼季, 1696 – July 21, 1743) was the fourth daimyō of Miharu Domain and sixth hereditary chieftain of the Akita clan. His courtesy title was Shinano-no-kami, and his court rank was Junior Fifth Rank, Lower Grade. He was the eldest son of Araki Takamura, a retainer of and distance relative of the Akita clan who had taken over the reins of the domain during the incapacity of Akita Terusue after the death of his son, Narisue. He was adopted by Akita Terusue in 1715 and was received in formal audience by Shōgun Tokugawa Ietsugu the same year. He also married Norisue's daughter. Later that year, Terusue resigned from all his titles and posts. He became daimyō on Terusue's death in 1720. This succession resulted in an O-Ie Sōdō by clan members who were opposed to Araki's power and position within the domain; however, the Tokugawa shogunate chose not to intervene and the issue died down with Araki's retirement. Yorisue's grave is at the temple of Kōken-in in Miharu.

=== Akita Nobusue ===
Akita Nobusue (秋田延季, 1721 – August 23, 1773) was the fifth daimyō of Miharu Domain and seventh hereditary chieftain of the Akita clan. His courtesy title was Kawachi-no-kami, and his court rank was Junior Fifth Rank, Lower Grade. He was the eldest son of Akita Yorisue by a concubine prior to his father's adoption into the Akita clan. In 1734 he was received in formal audience by Shōgun Tokugawa Yoshimune. He became daimyō on his father's death in 1743. He adopted his younger brother, Sadasue, as heir in 1750 and retired the following year. He died in 1773 and his grave is at the temple of Kōken-in in Miharu.

=== Akita Sadasue ===
Akita Sadasue (秋田定季, 1726 – July 29, 1757) was the sixth daimyō of Miharu Domain and eighth hereditary chieftain of the Akita clan. His courtesy title was Mondo-no-shō, and his court rank was Junior Fifth Rank, Lower Grade. He was the second son of Akita Yorisue. In 1737 he was received in formal audience by Shōgun Tokugawa Yoshimune, who asked that he join his personal guard. In 1750, he was adopted as heir by his brother Nobusue, and was received by Shōgun Tokugawa Ieshige the same year. He became daimyō on his brother's retirement in 1751. He died in 1757 and his grave is at the temple of Kōken-in in Miharu.

=== Akita Yoshisue ===
Akita Yoshisue (秋田倩季, 1751 – September 4, 1813) was the seventh daimyō of Miharu Domain and ninth hereditary chieftain of the Akita clan. His courtesy title was Yamashiro-no-kami, and his court rank was Junior Fifth Rank, Lower Grade. He was the second son of Akita Nobusue, who was born after Nobusue had retired, and in 1751 was posthumously adopted has heir to Sadasue, who had never married. In 1767 he was received in formal audience by Shōgun Tokugawa Ieharu. His wife was a daughter of Matsudaira Nobuiya of Yoshida Domain and he later married a daughter of Toyama Yoshimichi of Gujō Domain. In 1784, the domain was beset by crop failure and famine and was forced to borrow 2000 ryō from the shogunate. The following year, the domain mansion in Edo burned down, and the domain borrowed an additional 3000 ryō. He retired in 1797 and died in 1813. His grave is at the temple of Kōken-in in Miharu.

=== Akita Nagasue ===
Akita Nagasue (秋田長季, 1776 – August 24, 1811) was the eighth daimyō of Miharu Domain and tenth hereditary chieftain of the Akita clan. His courtesy title was Shinano-no-kami, and his court rank was Junior Fifth Rank, Lower Grade. He was the second son of Akita Yoshisue, and was received in formal audience by Shōgun Tokugawa Ienari in 1792. He became daimyō on his father's retirement in 1797. His wife was a daughter of Matsudaira Nobuiya of Yoshida Domain and he later married a daughter of Kuze Hiroyasu of Sekiyado Domain. In 1803 he retired and died in 1811 at the young age of 36. His grave is at the temple of Kōken-in in Miharu.

=== Akita Norisue ===
Akita Norisue (秋田孝季, 1786 – January 2, 1845) was the ninth daimyō of Miharu Domain and eleventh hereditary chieftain of the Akita clan. His courtesy title was Mondo-no-shō, and his court rank was Junior Fourth Rank, Lower Grade. He was the third son of Akita Yoshisue, and was made daimyō on the retirement of his brother in 1803. He had an uneventful tenure, and retired in 1832. He died in 1845 and his grave is at the temple of Kōken-in in Miharu.

=== Akita Tomosue ===
Akita Tomosue (秋田肥季, 1812 – May 28, 1865) was the tenth daimyō of Miharu Domain and twelfth hereditary chieftain of the Akita clan. His courtesy title was Awa-no-kami, and his court rank was Junior Fifth Rank, Lower Grade. He was the eldest son of Akita Norisue, and was made daimyō on the retirement of his father in 1832. His wife was an adopted daughter of Ikea Narimichi of Tottori Domain. In 1864, he was given responsibility for the guard at the Nikkō Tōshō-gū, but otherwise had an uneventful tenure. He died in 1865 and his grave is at the temple of Kōken-in in Miharu.

=== Akita Akisue ===
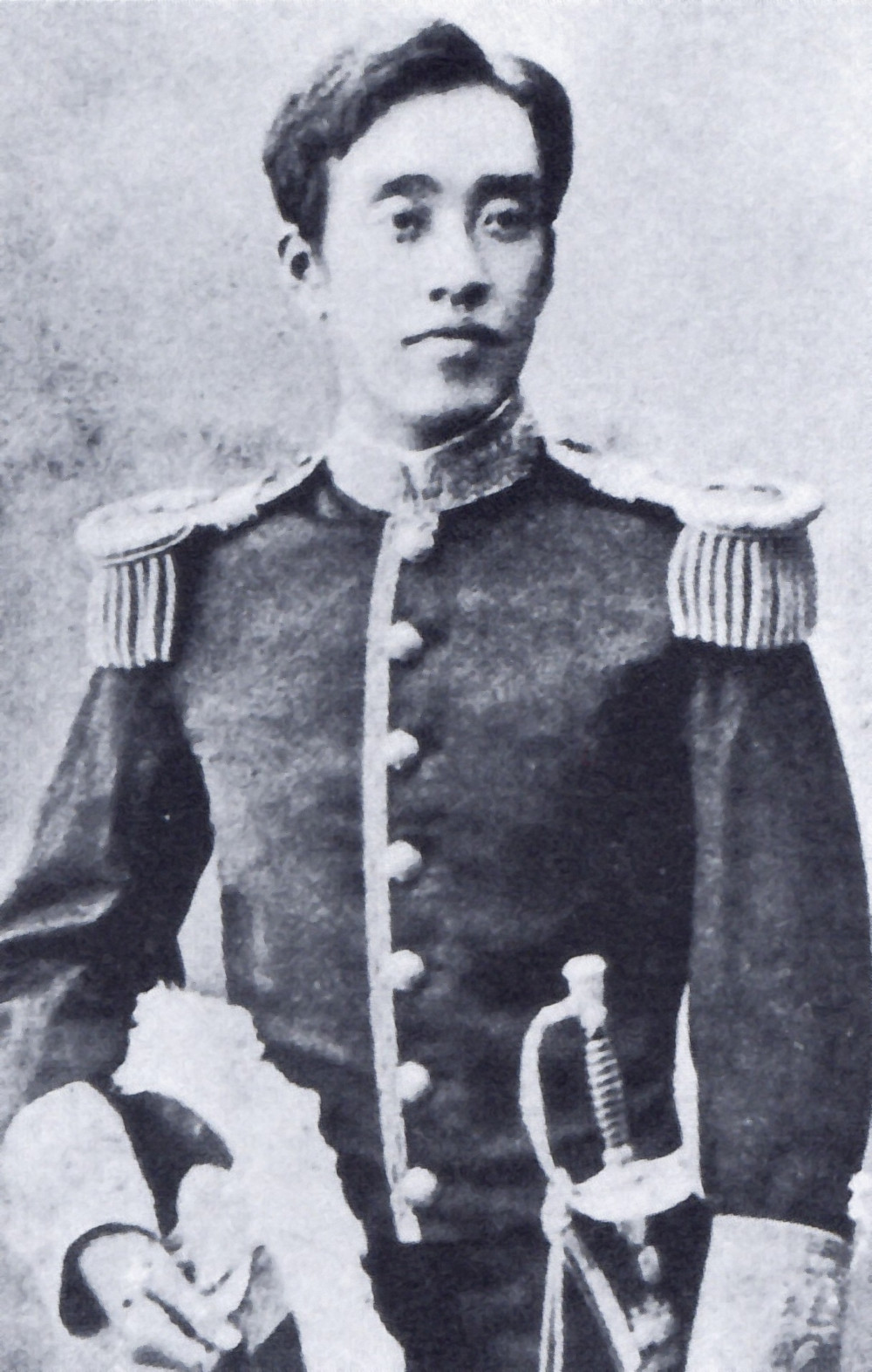

Akita Akisue (秋田映季, March 15, 1858 – February 19, 1907) was the eleventh (and final) daimyō of Miharu Domain and thirteenth hereditary chieftain of the Akita clan. His courtesy title was Shinano-mo-kami, and his court rank was Junior Fifth Rank, Lower Grade under the Tokugawa shogunate. He was the younger son of Akita Tomosue, and was made daimyō on his father's death in 1865. As he was still underage, actual power was controlled by his uncle, Akita Sueharu. His wife was a daughter of Yamauchi Toyofuku of Tosa-Shinden Domain. In 1868, Miharu Domain joined the Ōuetsu Reppan Dōmei in support of the Tokugawa clan against the Satchō Alliance, but refused demands by Aizu Domain during the Boshin War that it dispatch troops in support of the campaign against Shōnai Domain, citing the domain's small size and military weakness. The domain was subsequently ignored by both sides in the conflict, and Miharu samurai Kōno Hironaka organised a surrender to the new Meiji government Akita Akisue was confirmed as domain governor under the new administration from 1868 to the abolition of the han system in 1871. He later moved to Tokyo and studied at the Keio Gijuku. In 1884, he received the kazoku peerage title of viscount (shishaku) and from 1890 to 1897 served as a member of the House of Peers. He died in 1907 and his grave is at the temple of Kōken-in in Miharu. The position of hereditary chieftain of the Akita clan went to his adopted son, Akita Shigesue (1886–1958), followed by his son, Akita Kazusue (1915–1997).
