= Akita Sanesue =

Japanese daimyō

- 秋田 実季
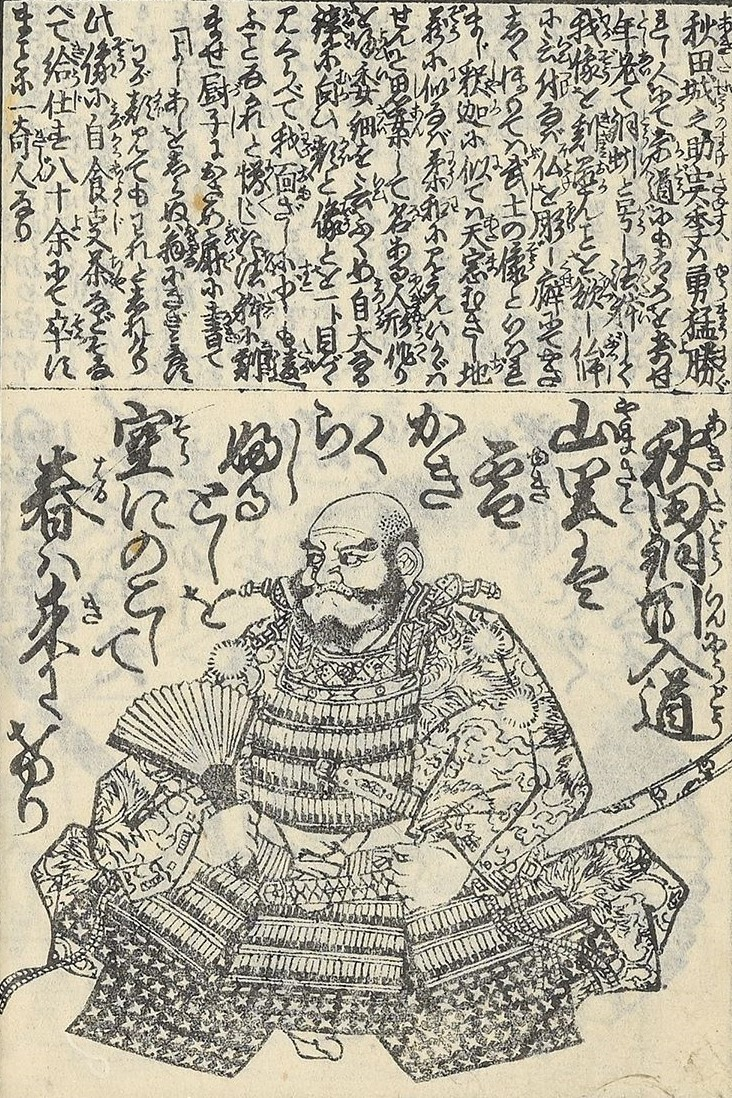

Lord of Shishido
- In office 1602–1630
- Succeeded by: Akita Toshisue

Personal details
- Born: 1576 Dewa Province, Japan
- Died: January 11, 1660 (aged 83–84) Asama, Ise Province

Akita Sanesue (秋田 実季; 1576 – January 11, 1660) was a Japanese daimyō who lived during the Azuchi–Momoyama and early Edo periods.

== Biography ==
He was the son of daimyo Andō Chikasue, a powerful figure in Dewa Province.

Sanesue pledged loyalty to Toyotomi Hideyoshi in 1590 during the Siege of Odawara, and served under him in various campaigns such as the Korean campaign.

At the Battle of Sekigahara in 1600, he sided with the eastern army. As Satake Yoshinobu was being moved northward to the Akita's holdings in 1602, the Akita clan, under Sanesue, was moved to Shishido, in Hitachi Province. Sanesue led his sons into combat at the Osaka Campaign in 1615.

In 1630, because of discontent against the shogunate, he was exiled to Asama in Ise Province, where he died in 1660. Despite this exile, his son Toshisue survived, and was moved to the Miharu Domain, in Mutsu Province, where his descendants remained in power until the Meiji Restoration.
