= Akita clan =

Japanese samurai clan in northern Honshū

Akita 秋田
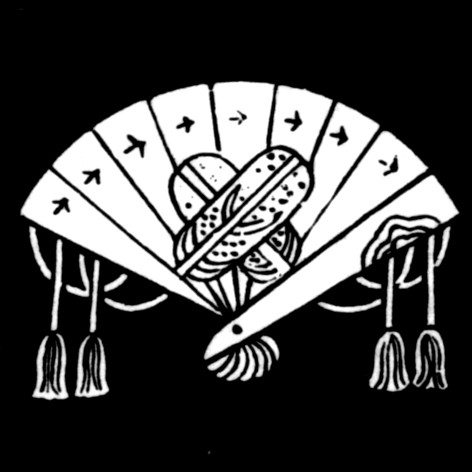
- Akita clan emblem
- Home province: Mutsu Province
- Parent house: Abe clan
- Founder: Abe no Sadato
- Final ruler: Akita Akisue
- Founding year: 11th century
- Ruled until: 1873 (Abolition of the han system)
- Cadet branches: None

The Akita clan (秋田氏, Akita-shi) was a Japanese samurai clan of northern Honshū that claimed descent from Abe no Sadato of the Abe clan. The Akita clan was originally known as the Andō clan (安東氏, Andō-shi). In the Kamakura period, they were installed in the Tsugaru district of Mutsu Province to trade with Ainu people for the Hōjō clan, and to administer Ezo as a penal colony.

In Sengoku period Andō clan was driven out by Nanbu clan, and migrated to the neighbouring province Dewa. Andō Chikasue, who held the title of Akitajō-no-suke, changed the clan's name to "Akita". Under Toyotomi Hideyoshi, Akita Sanesue was awarded a 50,000 koku fief in what is now the city of Akita, but in the capacity of local administrator (daikon) rather than as a daimyō. Following the Battle of Sekigahara and the establishment of the Tokugawa shogunate, the Satake clan was transferred from their ancestral domains in Hitachi Province to Dewa, and Akita Sanesue was relocated to Shishido Domain in the former Satake territories. Although his kokudaka remained unchanged 50,000 koku, Sanesue was very vocally unhappy with the transfer, and was eventually relieved of his position and exiled to Izu Province. His son, Akita Toshisue was later transferred to Miharu Domain in Mutsu Province with an increase to 55,000 koku. His son, Akita Morisue reduced the domain by 5,000 koku by giving a portion to his younger brother. Akita Terusue managed to get the status of the domain changed from tozama to fudai in 1645. The Akita clan remained at Miharu through the end of the Edo period.

Miharu Domain joined the Ōuetsu Reppan Dōmei in 1868, but played no role during the Boshin War. After the Meiji Restoration, the last daimyō of Miharu Domain, Akita Akisue, was given the title of viscount (shishaku).
