= Matsushiro Literary and Military School =

- 文武学校
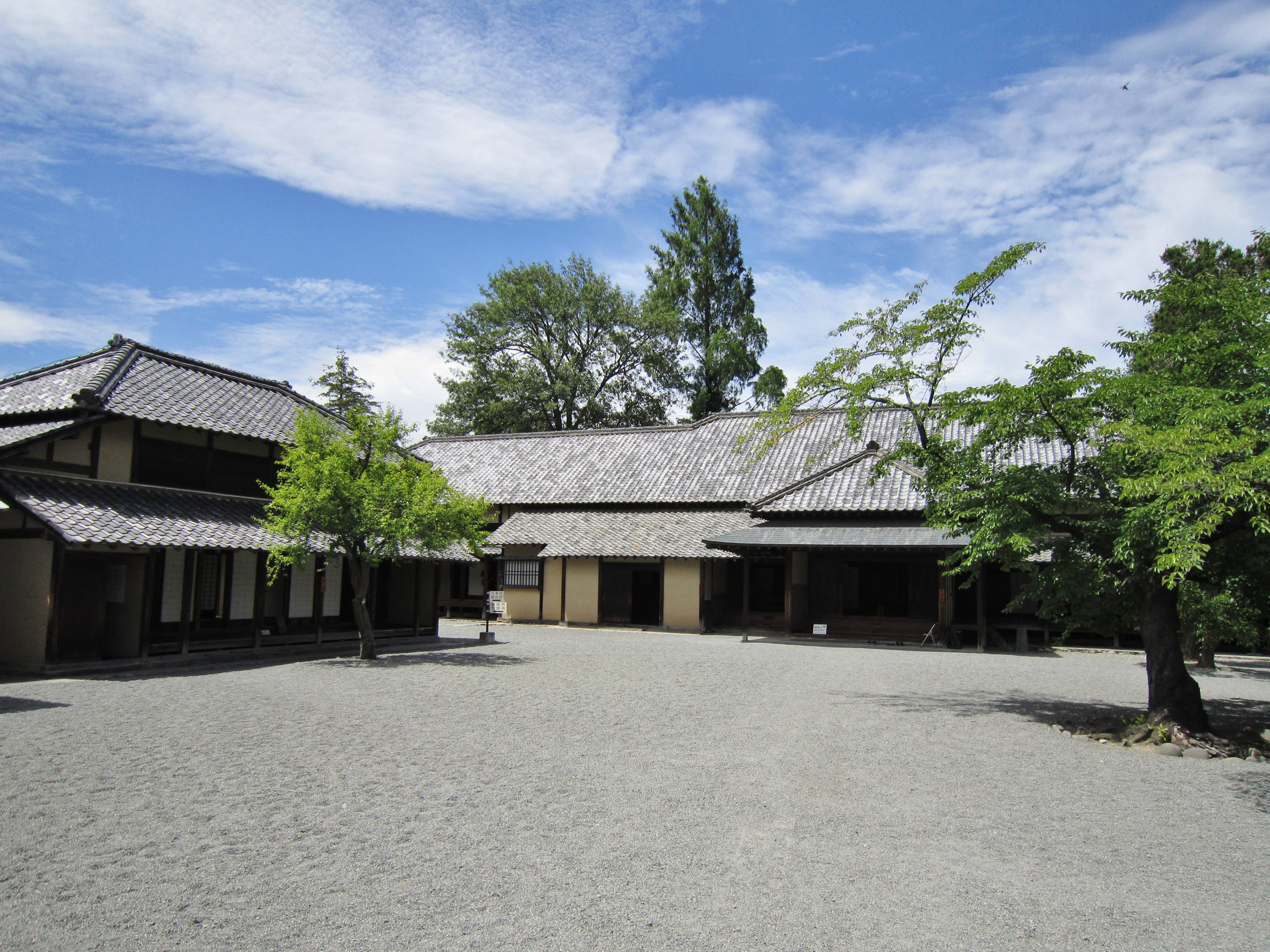
- Bunbu gakkō

- Location within Nagano Prefecture Location within Japan

General information
- Type: Han School
- Location: Nagano, Nagano, Japan, Japan
- Coordinates: 36°33′46″N 138°11′45″E
- Opened: 1855

Technical details
- Floor area: 3089 square meters
- National Historic Site of Japan

The Matsushiro Literary and Military School (文武学校, Bunbu gakkō) was the Han school of Matsushiro Domain under the Edo period Tokugawa shogunate. It located in the Matsushiro neighborhood of the city of Nagano in the Chūbu region of Japan. Of the over 250 han schools which existed in Japan at the end of the Edo period, it is the only one to survive in almost an intact form. The school was designated a National Historic Site of Japan in 1953. 205373

== Overview ==
Construction began on the Matsushiro Literary and Military School in 1852 and it was opened in 1855 under the 8th daimyō of Matsushiro, Sanada Yukitsura, although a number of schools had been established both within Matsushiro and within the domain's Edo residence since the time of the 6th daimyō Sanada Yukihiro in 1758. Work on the school began in 1851, but completion was delayed due to a fire which destroyed much of the Matsushiro jōkamachi. The school was structured per the recommendations of Sakuma Shōzan, and taught a combination of traditional Chinese literature, Ogasawara-ryū etiquette, Chinese medicine and martial arts alongside rangaku topics, including western medicine, military science and artillery. Unlike almost all other han schools, the school did not teach Confucianism, and there was no shrine to Confucius within the grounds.

During the Bakumatsu period, the emphasis on western military science became predominant, and a number of French military instructors were employed. The domain also hired Takeda Ayasaburō, a former instructor at the shogunate's Kaiseijō (開成所) and architect of the Goryōkaku star fort in Hokkaidō as an instructor. Following the Meiji restoration, the complex continued to be used as a military academy until the abolition of the han system in 1871, and was thereafter used as a school building of the Matsushiro Elementary School under the new government education system until the 1960s.

The total area of the school was 1500 square meters on a 3089 square meter site. It was renovated from 1973-1978, when it was opened to the public as a museum.

== See also ==
- List of Historic Sites of Japan (Nagano)
