= Matsushiro =

Matsushiro may refer to:

- Matsushiro Domain, a feudal domain under the Tokugawa shogunate of Edo period Japan
- Matsushiro, Nagano, a historically important town in Hanishina District, Nagano Prefecture, Japan
