= Yukinori =

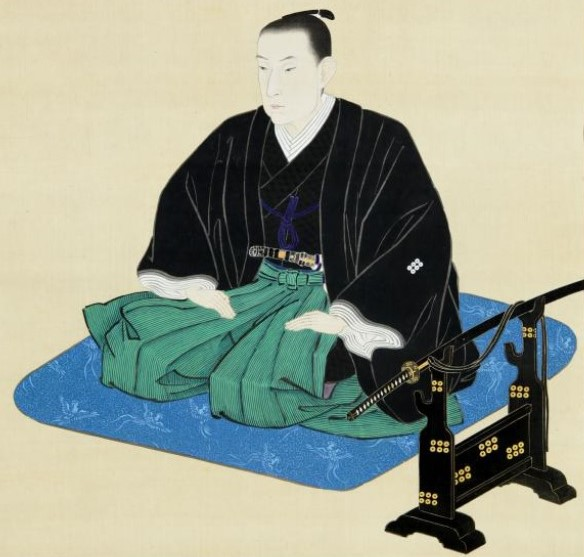
- Yukinori Sanada (1836–1869), Japanese feudal lord. Portrait at Sanada Museum, Matsushiro.
- Pronunciation: jɯkʲinoɾi (IPA)
- Gender: Male

Origin
- Origin: Japanese
- Meaning: Different meanings depending on the kanji used

Other names
- Alternative spelling: Yukinori (Kunrei-shiki) Yukinori (Nihon-shiki) Yukinori (Hepburn)

Yukinori is a masculine Japanese given name.

== Written forms ==
Yukinori can be written using different combinations of kanji characters. Here are some examples:

- 幸徳, "happiness, virtue"
- 幸憲, "happiness, constitution"
- 幸法, "happiness, method"
- 幸教, "happiness, teach"
- 幸典, "happiness, law code"
- 幸紀, "happiness, chronicle"
- 幸礼, "happiness, manners"
- 行規, "go, measure"
- 行徳, "go, virtue"
- 行法, "go, method"
- 以載, "by means of, to carry"
- 之紀, "of, chronicle"
- 之典, "of, law code"
- 之式, "of, ceremony"
- 志誠, "determination, truth"
- 雪紀, "snow, chronicle"
- 恭徳, "respectful, virtue"
- 運昇, "luck, climb"

The name can also be written in hiragana ゆきのり or katakana ユキノリ.

== Notable people with the name ==
- Yukinori Ando (安藤 之制; born 1915), Japanese baseball player
- Yukinori Aoyama (青山 幸礼; 1808–1838), Japanese daimyō
- Yukinori Dehara (出原 幸典; born 1974), Japanese character illustrator and artist
- Yukinori Goto (五藤 幸範; born 1979), Japanese footballer
- Yukinori Igarashi (五十嵐 幸則; born 1974), Japanese baseball player
- Yukinori Ishizuka (石塚 運昇; 1951–2018), a.k.a. Unshō Ishizuka, Japanese voicer actor
- Yukinori Kawae (河江 肖剰; born 1972), Japanese archaeologist
- Yukinori Kawaguchi (川口 幸範; born 1979), Japanese manga artist
- Yukinori Kida (木田 幸紀; born 1954), Japanese executive director of broadcasting
- Yukinori Kishida (岸田 行倫; born 1996), Japanese baseball player
- Yukinori Kitajima (北島 行徳; born 1965), Japanese novelist
- Yukinori Kobayashi (小林 幸徳; born 1957), Japanese mechanical engineer
- Yukinori Kujō (九条 幸教; 1700–1728), Japanese kugyō
- Yukinori Matsui (松井 幸則; born 1972), Japanese professional wrestling referee
- Yukinori Miyabe (宮部 行範; 1968–2017), Japanese speed skater
- Yukinori Miyata (宮田 幸典; born 1968), Japanese basketball player
- Yukinori Momiyama (籾山 幸徳; born 1985), Japanese baseball player
- Yukinori Muramatsu (村松 幸典; born 1969), Japanese footballer
- Yukinori Nemoto (根本 幸典; born 1965), Japanese politician
- Yukinori Oguni (小國 以載; born 1988), Japanese boxer
- Yukinori Okuhata (奥畑 幸典), Japanese voice actor
- Yukinori Ota (太田 行紀; born 1986), Japanese long-distance runner
- Yukinori Sanada (真田 幸教; 1836–1869), Japanese daimyō
- Yukinori Sanada (真田 幸憲; 1875–1950), Japanese educator
- Yukinori Sasa (佐々 幸範; 1981–2020), Japanese Brazilian Jiu-Jitsu black belt world medalist
- Yukinori Shigeta (重田 征紀; born 1976), Japanese footballer
- Yukinori Shimada (島田 幸典; born 1972), Japanese political scientist
- Yukinori Shiizu (椎津 行憲; 1505–1538), Japanese warlord of the Warring States period
- Yukinori Suzuki (鈴木 裕紀; born 1977), Japanese basketball player and coach
- Yukinori Takechi (武智 幸徳; born 1961), Japanese journalist
- Yukinori Takeguchi (竹口 幸紀; born 1955), Japanese baseball player
- Yukinori Tamaki (玉木 幸則; born 1968), Japanese writer
- Yukinori Tanaka (田中 穂徳; born 1966), Japanese swimmer
- Yukinori Tanaka (田中 志典; born 1958), Japanese politician
- Yukinori Tani (谷 幸則; born 1967), Japanese chemist
- Yukinori Taniguchi (谷口 行規; born 1968), Japanese businessman and racing driver
- Yukinori Tezuka (手塚 幸紀; 1940–2020), Japanese flutist and classical music conductor
- Yukinori Tokoro (所 幸則; born 1961), Japanese photographer
- Yukinori Tsunematsu (常松 之典; 1915–1980), Japanese microbiologist
- Yukinori Yamamoto (山本 侑典; born 1995), Japanese model
- Yukinori Yanagi (柳 幸典; born 1959), Japanese artist
- Yukinori Yoshikawa (好川 之範; 1946–2020), Japanese historian

== Fictional characters ==
- Yukinori Hayasaka (早坂 幸宜), from the manga Majin Tantei Nogami Neuro
- Yukinori Matsumoto (松本 郁憲), from the manga and anime Kuroko no Basket
- Yukinori Sawabe (沢辺 雪祈), from the manga and anime BLUE GIANT
- Yukinori Shinohara (篠原 幸紀), from the manga and anime Tokyo Ghoul
