= Matsushiro Castle =

Castle in Nagano prefecture, Japan

Coordinates: 36.566°N 138.196°E

- 松代城
- Nagano, Nagano Prefecture, Japan
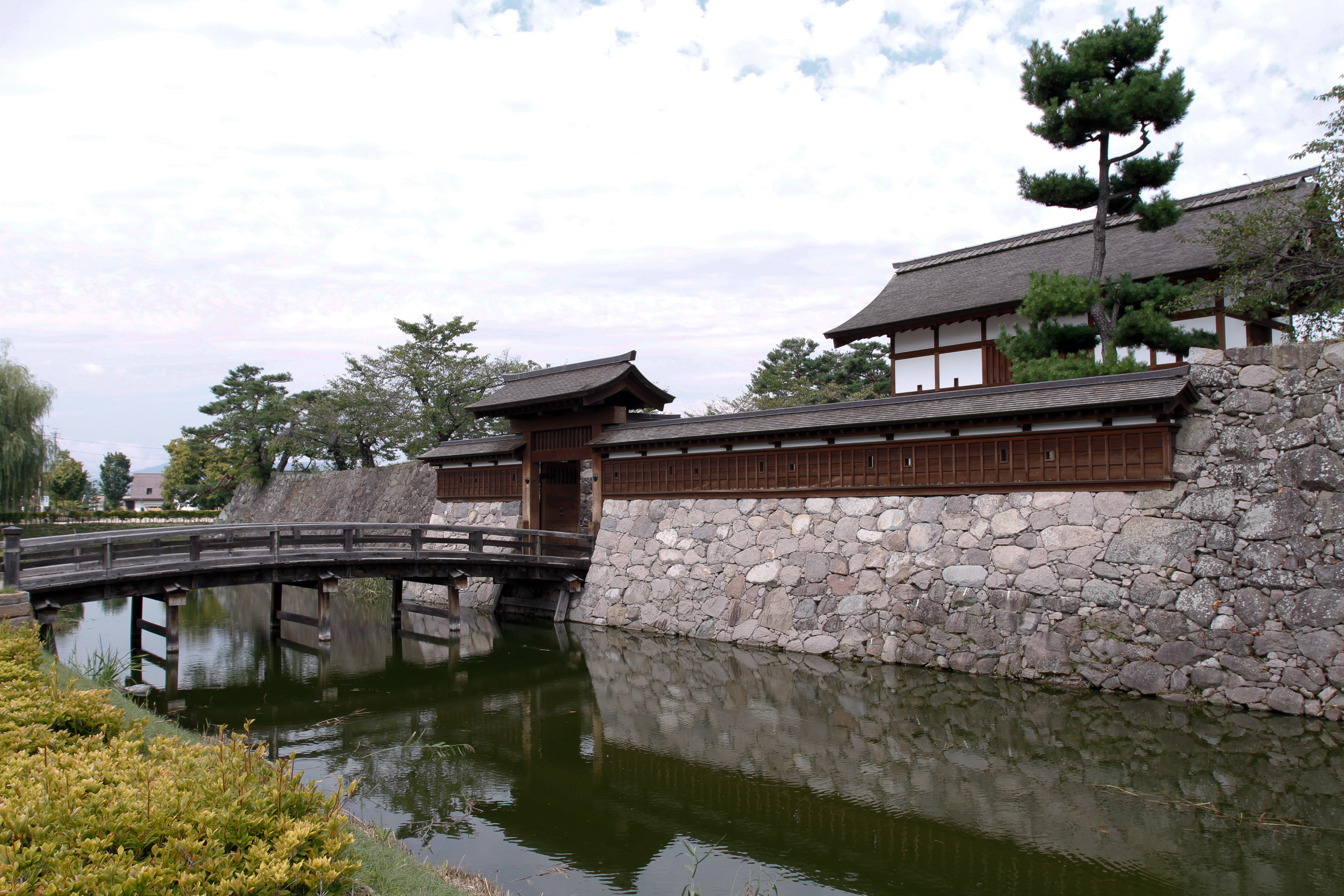
- Matsushiro Castle moats and reconstructed gate

Site information
- Type: flatland-style Japanese castle
- Open to the public: yes
- Condition: partially reconstructed

Location
- Matsushiro Castle Matsushiro Castle (Japan)

Site history
- Built: 1560
- Built by: Takeda Shingen
- In use: Edo period
- Demolished: 1872

Matsushiro Castle (松代城, Matsushiro-jō), formerly known as Kaizu Castle (海津城, Kaizu-jō), is a Japanese castle located in former Matsushiro town, now part of Nagano City. The site is a registered National Historic Site of Japan.

== Layout ==
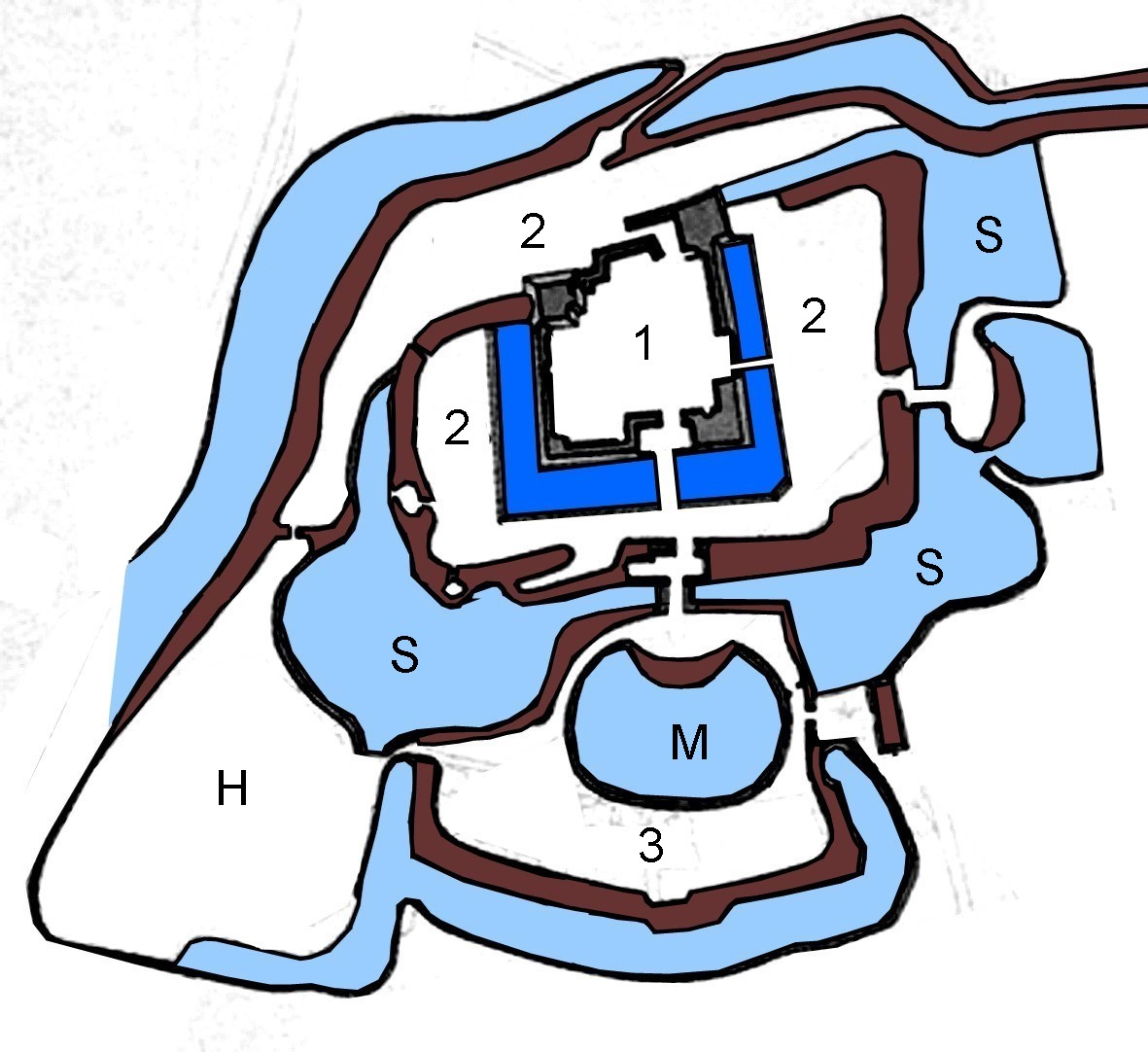
Plan of Matsushiro Castle

Matsushiro Castle is located in the flatlands of northern Shinano, in-between the main stream of the Chikuma River and a former bed of the river, which serves as a broad outer moat on the north side of the castle. Due to its location, the castle (and surrounding castle town) was subjected to occasional flooding.

The design of the castle is concentric, with the Central Bailey (Hon-Maru) protected by walls, and containing the tenshu in its northwest corner, which was later replaced by a yagura. The Central Bailey was surrounded by a moat, which was in turn surrounded completely by the Second Bailey (Ni-no-Maru), which had earthen ramparts except for areas around its gates, which were protected by stonework. The Second Bailey had a wide dry moat on its south and east, and the Third Bailey (San-no-Maru). The palace structures, or residence and official offices of the daimyō, were located adjacent to the main fortifications in the Hana-no-Maru enclosure.

== History ==
The first castle on this site was built in 1560 by Yamamoto Kansuke, under the direction of Takeda Shingen and was called Kaizu Castle (海津城, Kaizu-jō) Kōsaka Danjō (Kōsaka Masanobu) a Takeda clan retainer, was its first commander. Takeda Shingen used the castle for the ongoing conflict with Uesugi Kenshin for control of the northern part of Shinano Province. The site is also near the location of the Battle of Kawanakajima, where the Takeda and Uesugi forces repeatedly clashed After the fall of the Takeda clan, Oda Nobunaga eventually took control. However, when he was assassinated in the Honnō-ji incident in 1582, Uesugi Kagekatsu recovered northern Shinano. During this time the castle was in dispute between Uesugi and the Sanada clan. Under Toyotomi Hideyoshi, the Uesugi were relocated to Aizu. Following Hideyoshi's death and the Battle of Sekigahara, the Tokugawa shogunate ordered Sanada Nobuyuki to relocate here in 1622 from his former domains at Ueda as the daimyō of Matsushiro Domain.

The castle's name was changed from Kaizu Castle to Matsushiro Castle by Sanada Yukimichi, the third generation of Sanada daimyō in 1711. The castle burned down in 1717, but was restored in 1718, partly through the donation of 10,000 ryō for its reconstruction by the Tokugawa shogunate. In 1742, the castle was severely damaged by a flood, and reconstruction took until 1758. The palace structures were relocated to the Hana-no-Maru enclosure in 1770 and were rebuilt in 1804; however, much of the castle was destroyed in 1847 by an earthquake. The palace burned down in 1853 again, but was soon rebuilt. A secondary palace outside the castle enclosure was completed in 1864.

Following the establishment of the Meiji government and the abolition of the han system, most of the remaining structures of the castle were dismantled in 1871, and what was left was burned down in an act of arson in 1873, leaving only the stone foundations.

== Current site ==
On the current site, several of the gates were authentically reconstructed in 2003 using traditional construction methods, with designs based on documents and photographs of the originals. The ramparts and moats have been repaired. The castle is a registered National Historic Site. Near the castle are a number of Edo period former samurai residences, the former Matsushiro Literary and Military School and a museum dedicated to the Sanada clan.

Matsushiro Castle was listed as one of the 100 Fine Castles of Japan by the Japan Castle Foundation in 2006.

== Access ==
The site can be most easily accessed by Alpico bus from in front of JR Nagano Station, Zenkoji Exit, bus stop #3. Get off at "Matsushiro-eki", a disused railway station, of the Nagano Electric Railway on the former Yashiro Line, and walk for 3 minutes.

== See also ==
- List of Historic Sites of Japan (Nagano)

== Gallery ==
Matsushiro Castle
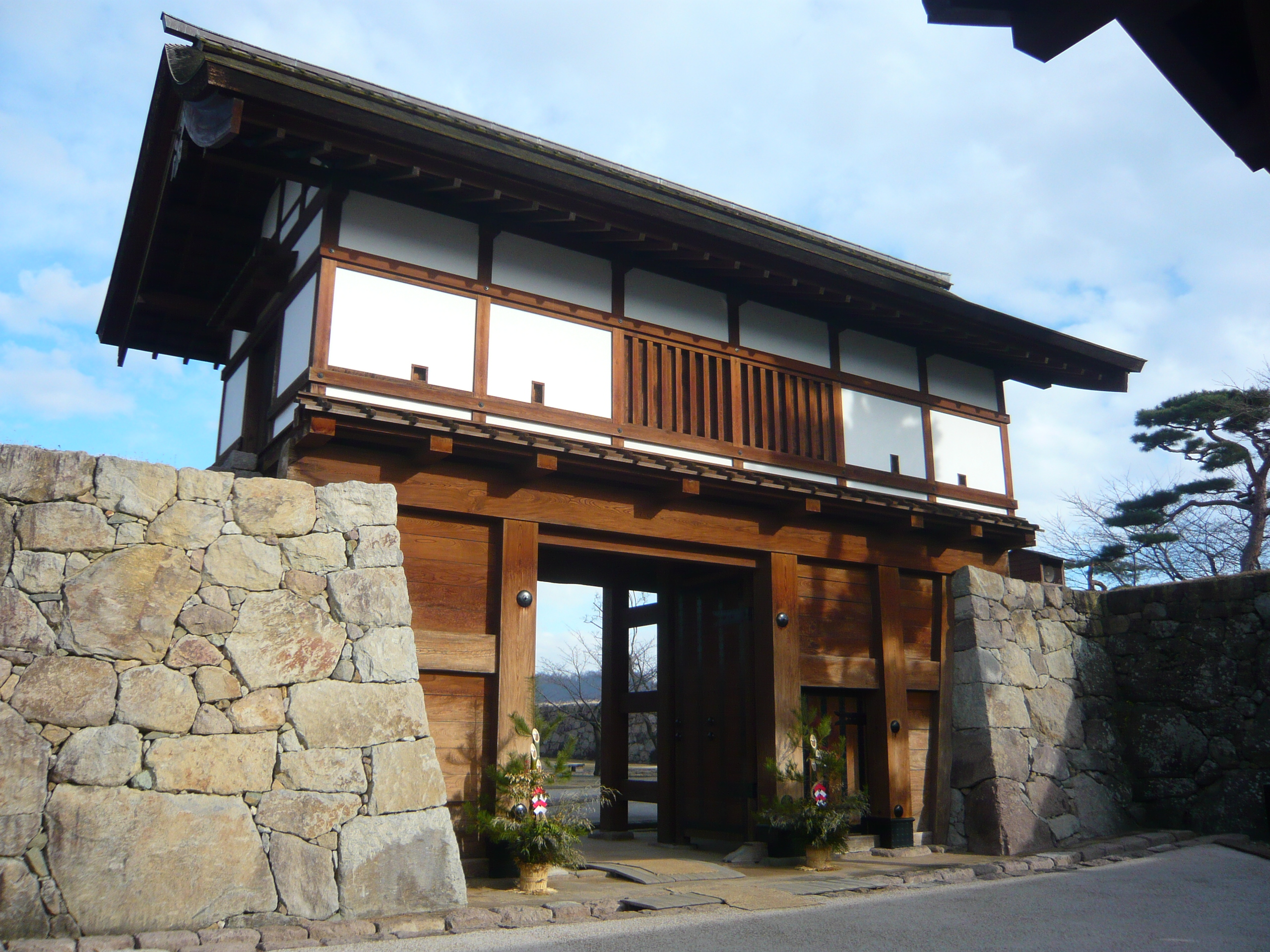
Reconstructed gate of Matsushiro Castle

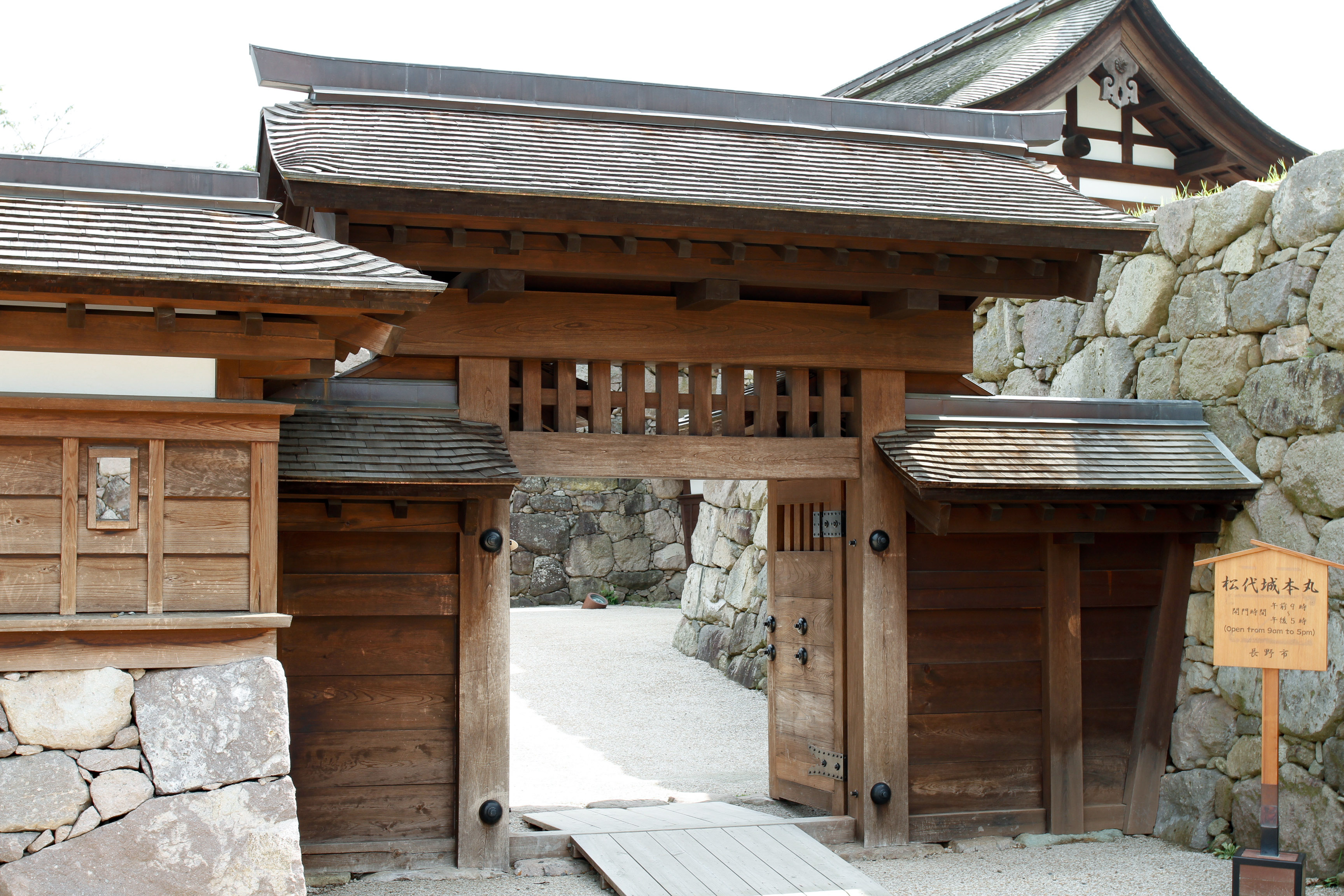
Reconstructed gate of Matsushiro Castle

Moats of Matsushiro Castle

Ramparts of Matsushiro Castle

== Literature ==
- De Lange, William (2021). An Encyclopedia of Japanese Castles. Groningen: Toyo Press. p. 600. ISBN 978-9492722300.
- Schmorleitz, Morton S. (1974). Castles in Japan. Tokyo: Charles E. Tuttle Co. pp. 144–145. ISBN 0-8048-1102-4.
- Motoo, Hinago (1986). Japanese Castles. Tokyo: Kodansha. p. 200 pages. ISBN 0-87011-766-1.
- Mitchelhill, Jennifer (2004). Castles of the Samurai: Power and Beauty. Tokyo: Kodansha. p. 112 pages. ISBN 4-7700-2954-3.
- Takada, Toru: Matsushiro-jo in: Miura, Masayuki (eds): Shiro to Jinya. Tokoku-hen. Gakken, 2006. ISBN 978-4-05-604378-5, S. 128th
- Turnbull, Stephen (2003). Japanese Castles 1540-1640. Osprey Publishing. p. 64 pages. ISBN 1-84176-429-9.
