= Matsushiro ware =

Type of Japanese pottery

Matsushiro ware (Japanese: 松代焼) is produced in Matsushiro, Nagano Prefecture, Japan.

The one used today is restoration in 1972 through reproduce by pieces of the original one as reference. Kiln is still manufacturing and one of the representatives at Hokushin area.

The characteristic of Matsushiro ware is blue-based and blue-green glaze flowed dynamically. Since the earth contains copper, the base becomes blue. Green glaze, the uniqueness of Matsushiro ware is made by natural resources completely.
