= Nagano Interchange =

Nagano Interchange 長野インターチェンジ
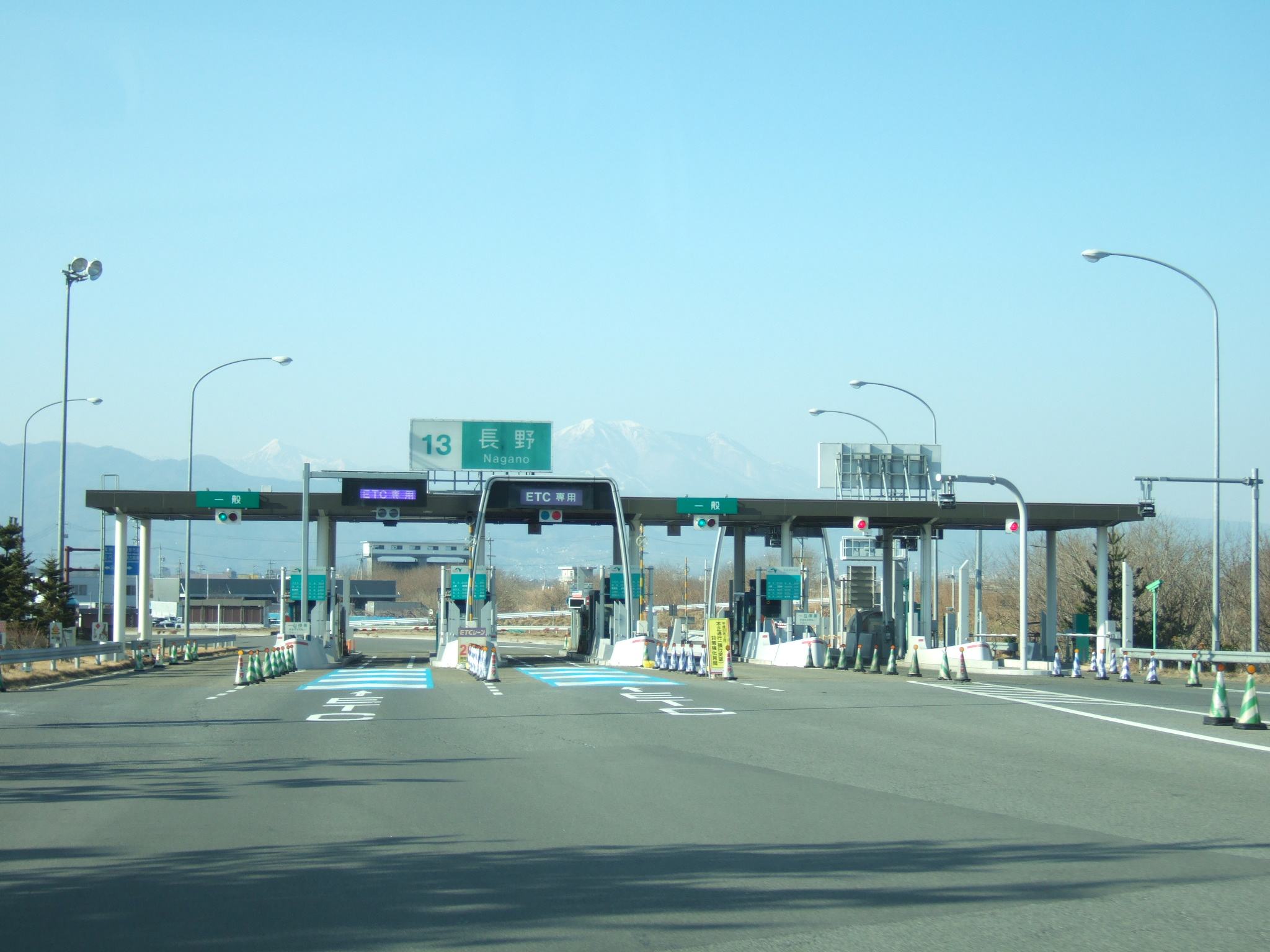
- Nagano Interchange (Toll gate)
- Interactive map of Nagano Interchange 長野インターチェンジ

Location
- Higashi Terao, Matsushiro-machi, Nagano, Nagano
- Coordinates: 36°34′30.5″N 138°12′3.8″E
- Roads at junction: National Route 403 and Nagano Prefectural Route 35

Construction
- Opened: March 25, 1993

Nagano Interchange (長野インターチェンジ, Nagano-Intāchenji) is a road interchange located in Nagano City, Nagano Prefecture, Japan.

This is the interchange nearest to downtown Nagano City, which is the capital of Nagano Prefecture, and Matsushiro. It is on:

- National Route 403
- Prefectural Route 35 (長野県道35号長野真田線).

It also provides easy access to:

- National Route 18
- National Route 19

== Expressway ==
- East Nippon Expressway Company
  - Jōshin-etsu Expressway

== Adjacent Interchanges ==
←	Service	→
East Expressway Company
Jōshin-etsu Expressway
Matsushiro PA	-	Suzaka-Naganohigashi IC
