= Matsushiro Underground Imperial Headquarters =

WW2 bunker complex in Japan

Coordinates: 36.545811°N 138.203931°E

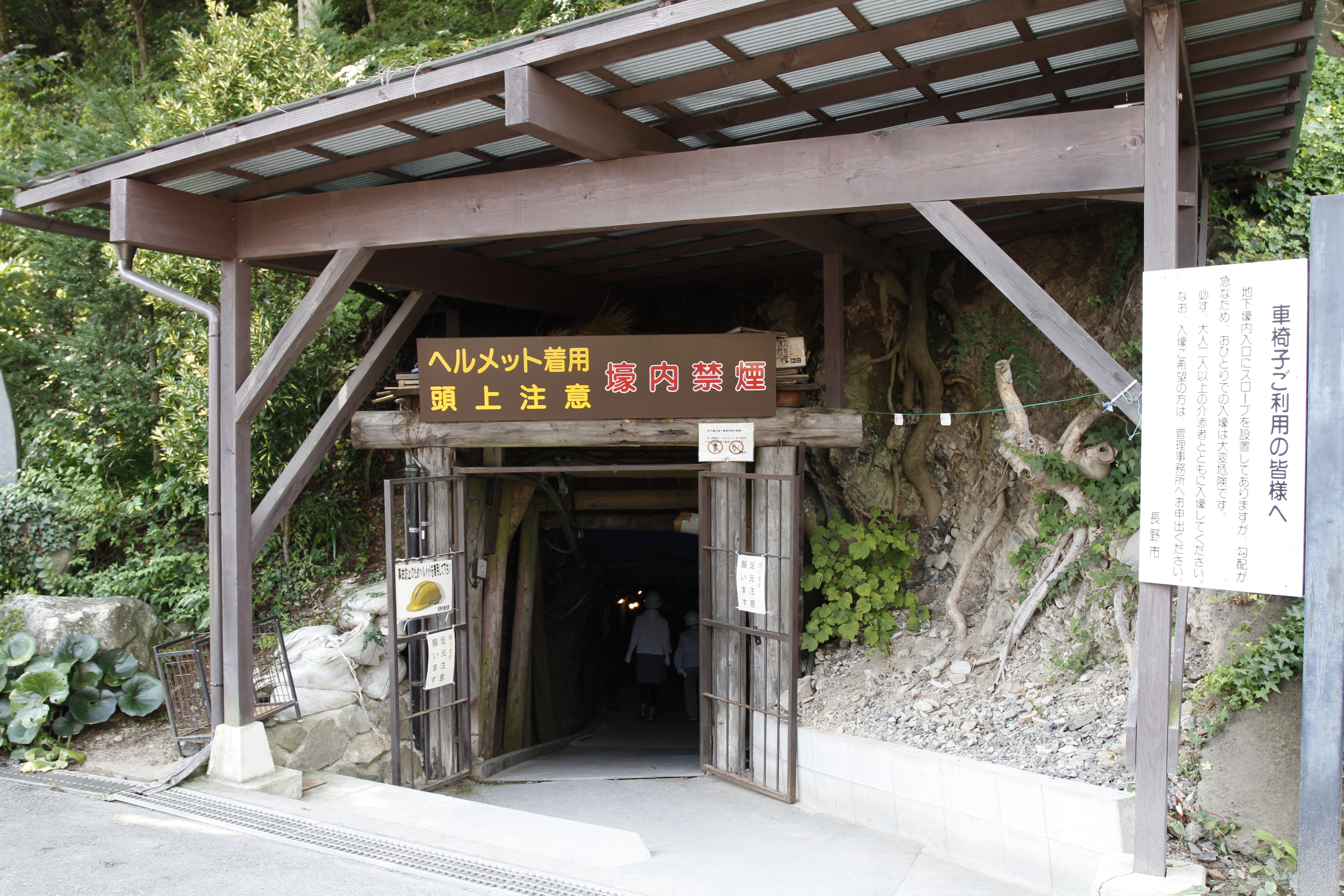
The entrance to the complex

The Matsushiro Underground Imperial Headquarters (松代大本営, Matsushiro Daihon'ei; "Matsushiro Imperial Headquarters Site") was a large underground bunker complex built during the Second World War in the town of Matsushiro, which is now a suburb of Nagano, Japan.

The facility was constructed so that the central organs of the government of the Empire of Japan could be transferred there in the event of an Allied invasion. In its construction, three mountains that were symbolic of the Matsushiro municipality were damaged.

Parts of the caves are open to the public today, and are operated as a tourist attraction by Nagano.

== Construction ==
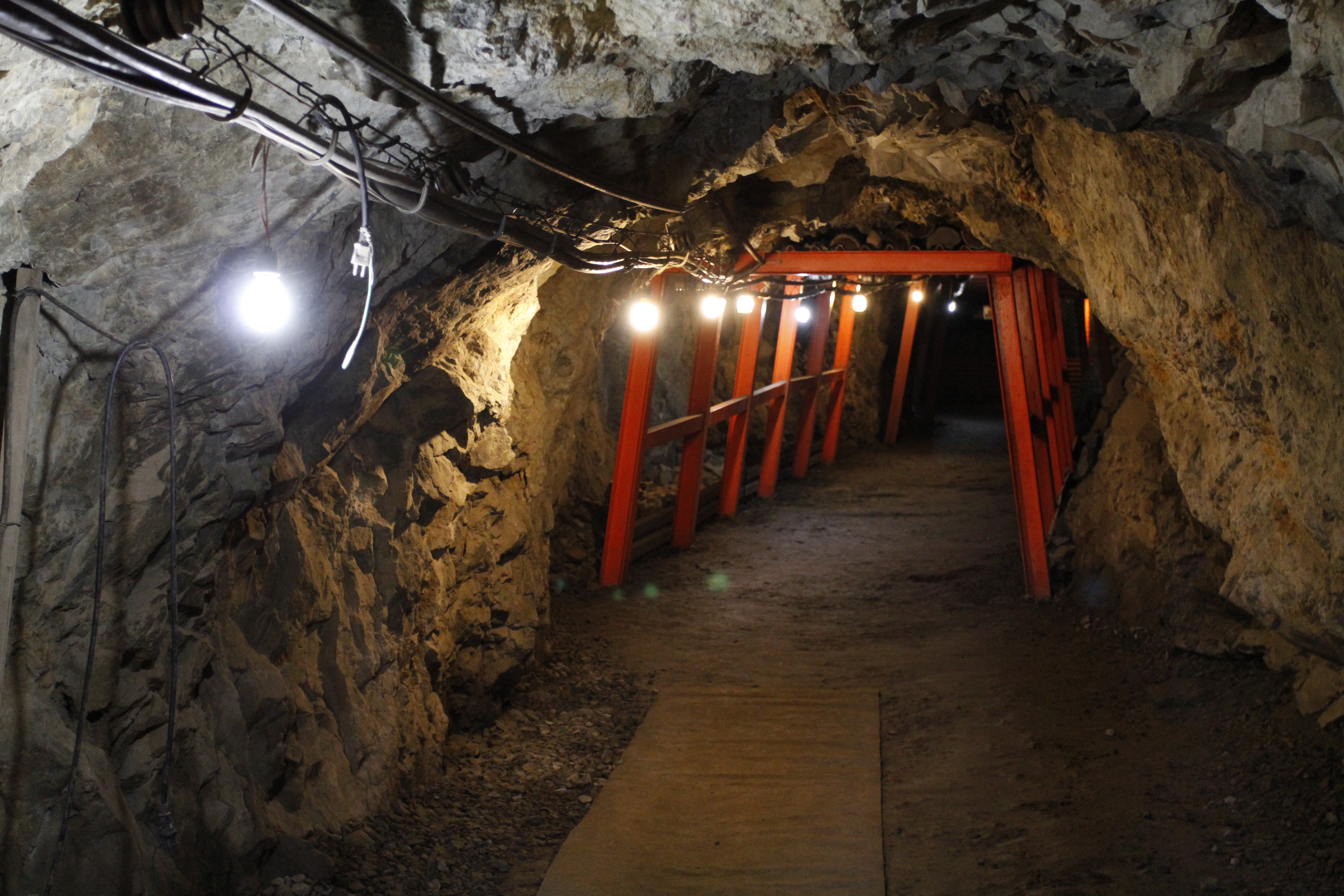
A view of the caves

Construction began on November 11, 1944, and continued until Japan's surrender on August 15, 1945. Construction was 75% completed at the end of the war, with 5,900 square meters (64,000 sq ft) of floor-space (60,000 cubic meters (2,000,000 cu ft) of volume) excavated. Between 7,000 and 10,000 Korean forced laborers were used to build the complex, and it is estimated that 1,500 of them died. Forty-six Koreans disappeared on August 15, 1945, when Japan surrendered. The project cost ¥200,000,000.

== Composition ==
The complex was an interlinked series of tunnels underneath several mountains. Facilities for the Imperial General Headquarters and palace functions were constructed under Mount Maizuru; military communications under Mount Saijo; government agencies, the Japan Broadcasting Corporation (NHK) and central telephone facilities under Mount Zōzan; the residences of the imperial family under Mount Minakami, and the Imperial Sanctuary under Mount Kōbō.

== Purpose ==
The original purpose of the complex was to serve as an alternative headquarters for the Imperial General headquarters. However, in March 1945, secret orders were issued to add a palace to the complex. Yoshijirō Umezu informed Emperor Hirohito about construction of the complex in May, but did not tell him that it contained a palace. The plan was to relocate the Emperor to the complex in an armored train. When informed about the existence of the palace in July, Hirohito twice refused to relocate. It has been suggested that he refused because going to Matsushiro would have isolated the Emperor and allowed the army to rule in his name, effectively guaranteeing they would pursue the war to "suicidal extremes".

Before the war, the Imperial Army's prevalent thinking was that Tokyo, close to the shore and on the rim of the Kantō Plain, was indefensible. Therefore, in the scenario of a fight on Japanese soil, they planned to have the vital organs of government shifted inland. When Saipan fell in July 1944, the bombing of Japan and the final battle in Japan became a real problem. In the same month, by a decision made at Prime Minister and War leader Hideki Tojo's last cabinet meeting, approval was given to transfer the palace, the army headquarters and other important governmental organs to Matsushiro. The complex was designed specifically to withstand B-29 bombings.

== Construction ==
In the initial plan, the government, the NHK and the telephone bureau was planned for the Mount Zōzan tunnel. The Mount Minakami tunnel was intended to house the Imperial Palace and the general staff. However, the soil beneath the mountain could not support such a scheme and the plan was changed to move the palace and the general staff to the Mount Maizuru tunnel. On Mount Maizuru, a concrete building was constructed externally and the Mount Minakami tunnel was converted into a storage facility. The combined length of the three shelters exceeded 10 km.

The army bought the land through government agencies. Since silkworm keeping was very profitable at that time, the acquisition of mulberry fields was made at three different prices according to the productivity of the land. The land was deemed useless after the war and saw its value drop to half of the price at which it was acquired. 130 of roughly 500 families were evacuated for the construction, which was directed by the Eastern Command of the Imperial Army. Agriculture itself was allowed, so farmers and their dependents stayed at relatives' houses nearby. To conceal the extent of the evacuation, the houses of evacuated families were left as they were and the families were allowed to leave with only three tatami mats. After the war, on 9 November, some returned to their houses and started repairs.

The first explosion was made on 11 November 1944 and work commenced thereafter. Dynamite was used and the debris was removed primarily through human labour. In total, 7000 Koreans and 3000 Japanese worked three eight-hour shifts and later two twelve-hour shifts on the site. Aside from the above, a further estimated 120,000 workers from Nishimatsu Company, 79,600 labour volunteers, 157,000 subcontractors from the companies Nishimatsu and Kajima, and 254,000 Korean labourers were involved in the project. However, with three-quarters of the facilities completed, work was halted on 15 August due to the surrender of Japan.

== Imperial shrine ==
There was in place a plan to move the Imperial Regalia of Japan of the Imperial Sanctuary from Tokyo to Matsushiro. Initially, the replacement shrine was planned in the Mount Maizuru tunnels.

However, the unit in charge of the shrine had no idea how to build one. Tokyo University engineering professor Private First Class Katsukazu Sekino was put in charge. The headquarters asked the advice of several other professors. At the instruction of one of them, the tunnels were split into lightning forms to reduce the impact from bombs. The "Japanese of pure blood" came from youths at the Atami branch of the Railroad Ministry training institutes. Work started in July 1944, but was halted shortly thereafter.

== Naval tunnel ==
The Imperial Japanese Navy opposed the idea of fighting a battle on Japanese soil. Nonetheless it was allotted a tunnel plan in June 1945. The 300th Division in Yokosuka engaged in building aircraft hangars sent half of its strength to build the naval tunnel. It was intended to be 3.5 km long and was 16 km away from the rest of the complex in Matsushiro. The capacity of the tunnel was approximately 1,000 people. The group managed to dig 100 meters into the ground before the surrender.

== Comfort women ==
Around the shelters, there were three comfort houses with four to five Korean comfort women servicing them.

== Location ==
Major Masataka Ida of the Ministry of War of Japan and later of Kyūjō incident fame, proposed the location. After the general staff approved it, the Railway Ministry conducted a survey of the area, finalizing the plans to build the complex. Six advantages of the location were pointed out in Ida's proposition:

1. The widest flat area in Honshu, with an airstrip nearby;
2. Solid substrate suitable for excavation and ability to withstand 10-ton bombs;
3. Completely surrounded by mountains, yet having a sufficient flat surface area for underground construction;
4. Abundance of labor (later proven untrue);
5. Nagano Prefecture's residents were naive people and would not reveal secrets.
6. The old name for Nagano, Shinshū (信州, "Shin[ano] Province"), is a homophone of Shinshū (神州, "land of the gods"), and was therefore considered auspicious.

This proposal primarily involved setting up bunkers for the army throughout the Japanese homeland. It was afterwards that Prime Minister Tojo Hideki expanded the project to accommodate the transfer of the government.

While the project was an operational secret in the guise of a warehouse, according to a statement of a local Japanese labourer, rumors were rife in the surrounding villages and towns that the emperor was coming to town. The cause of the rumors was the massive amounts of cargo arriving in trains.

== After the war ==
After the surrender of Japan, most of the documents relating to the Matsushiro complex were destroyed. As a result, very little is known about the day-to-day construction of the facility.

In 1946, a local Buddhist association received permission to convert what was going to be the imperial palace into an orphanage. In 1947, plans to convert the whole complex into an orphanage complex for war orphans were debated but not implemented. The Meteorological Agency then set up a seismographic office in the concrete building at Mount Maizuru. An assortment of seismographs and equipment were installed, making it the largest office of its kind in Japan.

In 1967, the Matsushiro Earthquake Center was built on part of the Mount Maizuru ruins following a local earthquake. In 1990, parts of the Mount Zōzan bunker were opened by Nagano Municipality and Shinshu University set up an astronomical observatory inside. Subsequently, more of the complex was opened by the sightseeing department of the same office.

The city of Nagano spent many years trying to attract the Olympic Games, culminating in their successful bid to host the 1998 Winter Olympics. During the bidding period and again during the games, peace activists accused the city of Nagano and the Nagano Organizing Committee (NAOC) of burying the past. Masako Yamane, a local activist who worked to bring increased attention to the Matsushiro complex, decried actions by Nagano officials which she felt obfuscated the site’s history: "Just the other day, the authorities blocked the entrances to the underground shelters with fences, despite requests that the last Imperial General Headquarters should be preserved and left be open to the public. They're afraid it will hurt their chances to get the Olympic Games to come to Nagano! They're trying to draw down the curtain on the Shōwa era. It's inexcusable.”

During the games, the complex was omitted from all maps and tourist information passed out to visitors. Peace activists asked the NAOC to include the caves on their list of interesting places to visit in Nagano, but their requests went unanswered.

The complex today is administered by Nagano city's sightseeing bureau. The caves are mostly closed to the public – only the first 500 meters of the Mount Zōzan facilities are open.

In 2014, in response to protests from Japanese nationalists the city of Nagano placed tape over the mention of the forced conscription of Korean laborers in the onsite plaque.

== See also ==
- Volunteer Fighting Corps
- Japanese Government Railways
- Japan Meteorological Agency

Other bunkers:

- Lobang Jepang (by the 25th Army)
- Project Greek Island (at The Greenbrier Hotel)
- Wolfsschanze
- Führerbunker
- Churchill War Rooms
- Underground Project 131
