= Benten Daiba =

Coastal battery in late Edo-period Japan

- 弁天台場
- Benten-Cho, Hakodate, Hokkaido in Japan
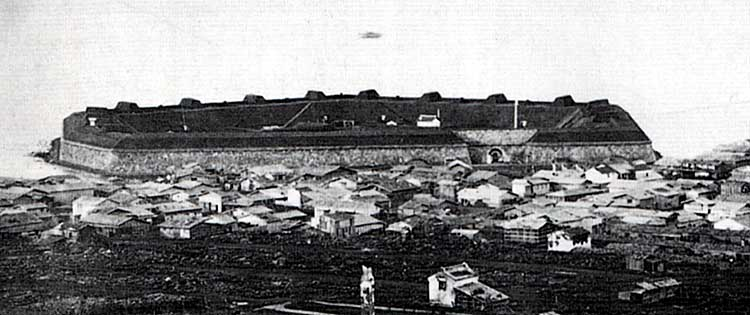
- Distant view of Benten Daiba, photographed in 1868.

Site information
- Type: Coastal Battery

Location
- Coordinates: 41°46′24.38″N 140°42′13.00″E
- Area: 38,300 square meters (after rebuilt)
- Height: 11.2 meters (after rebuilt)
- Length: 712 meters (after rebuilt)

Site history
- Built by: Tokugawa Shogunate desiened: Takeda Ayasaburō
- In use: 1863-1869
- Materials: earthworks and stone wall
- Demolished: 1896
- Battles/wars: Hakodate war (the last phase of Boshin War)

Garrison information
- Past commanders: Nagai Genba (永井 玄蕃)

Benten Daiba (弁天台場) (Note: As described below, during the period of the original daiba and the reconstruction planning, it was officially called "Benten Misaki Daiba" or "Benten Zaki Daiba," while "Benten Daiba" is a colloquial name that became widely used after the reconstruction.) was a coastal battery constructed in the late Edo period in what is now Benten-chō (弁天町), Hakodate City, Hokkaido, as one of a group of coastal fortifications built to defend the northern territories of Ezo (modern Hokkaido) against the increasing presence of foreign ships. Initially a small-scale Japanese-style battery, in Bakumatsu (幕末), it was rebuilt as part of coastal defense enhancements following the opening of Hakodate Port to counter foreign vessels entering the port. Subsequently, it became a central component of Hakodate Bay's defenses and, during the Hakodate War (箱館戦争, Last phase of Boshin War at Oshima peninsula), served as a key defensive facility for the former-shogunate forces (旧幕府軍), engaging in fierce battles with the new government's naval fleet (see below). It is also known as Benten Misaki Daiba (弁天岬台場), Benten Zaki Daiba (弁天崎台場). (Note: The designation "Daiba (台場)" is sometimes replaced with the synonymous Japanese term "Hōdai (砲台)", as in the case of "Benten Daiba (弁天台場)" being written as "Benten Hōdai (弁天砲台).") The reconstruction was designed by Takeda Ayasaburō (武田 斐三郎).

== Structure and Military Strength of the Battery ==
A large polygonal fortress shaped like an irregular hexagon, resembling a shōgi piece, with each side broadly facing various directions within the harbor, designed to encompass the entire surrounding sea within its firing angles.

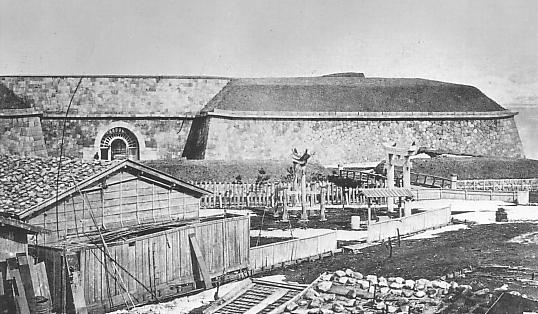
The rampart of Benten Daiba (near the entrance). The lower part of the earthen rampart is covered with a stone wall, separated by a cordon.

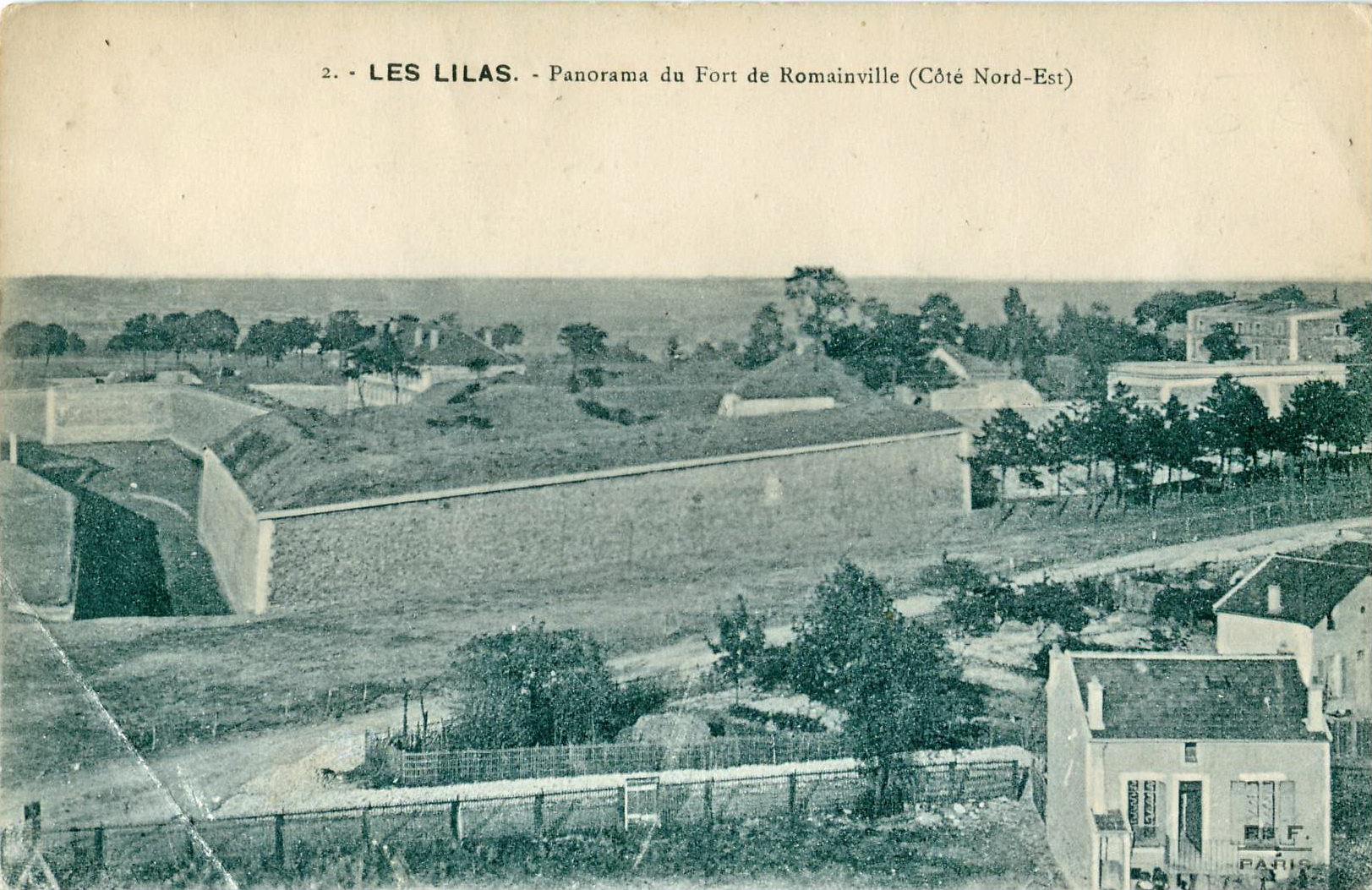
Panorama of Fort Romainville (France), constructed in the 1930s. Paying attention to the similarity in the outer wall structure with Benten Daiba.

The total area was approximately 38,300 square meters. The enclosing fortifications featured an arched tunnel-style entrance at the southeastern end, with the lower part covered by a stone wall about 11.2 meters high, and consisted of an earthen rampart spanning about 780 meters around the perimeter. (Note: This fortification structure closely resembles the design used for outer rampart walls in European military theory from the 18th century through the 19th century, following the Cormontaigne System devised by the French fortification scholar Louis Cormontaigne. The image of Fort Romainville in France, which utilized the outer wall construction method of the Cormontaigne System, has been referenced and included.)

The earth and stone were primarily quarried from Mount Hakodate (函館山), while critical components, such as the main gate, are said to have used Bizen Mikage granite transported from Osaka. The construction was overseen by Matsukawa Bennosuke (松川弁之助) for earthworks and Inoue Kisaburo (井上喜三郎) for masonry.

The battery was equipped with a total of 15 large fixed cannons, comprising two 60-pounder cannons and thirteen 24-pounder long cannons, with one cannon placed at each gun emplacement separated by the fortification walls.

Regarding these deployed cannons, there is a popular anecdote that in 1854, when the Russian ship Diana, carrying Putiatin for the Russo-Japanese Treaty of Amity negotiations, was wrecked and severely damaged by a tsunami caused by the Ansei Earthquake, the crew gifted 50 ship-mounted cannons to the shogunate as a gesture of gratitude to the residents of Shimoda who aided in the rescue. These cannons were purportedly used as part of Benten Daiba's armament.

A historical record believed to be related to this is found in the Kameda Goyakusho Goryōkaku/Benten Misaki Daiba Construction Records (亀田御役所五稜郭・弁天岬御臺場御普請御用留), which states: "At this time, a total of 52 cannons were donated, and in 1860, the Hakodate Magistrate requested that 24 of them be allocated for Benten Daiba's armament, which was subsequently approved." In fact, while the budget and financial statements (see below) for Benten Daiba include detailed expenditures for cannon-related facilities such as gun carriages, rail-type fixed gun mounts, and gun platforms, there is no record of expenses for the purchase of the cannons themselves. This suggests the possibility that the deployed cannons may have indeed been sourced from those of the aforementioned ship.

In any case, both the "60-pounder cannon" (presumed to be the 60-pounder Parrott rifle) and the 24-pounder long cannon were large cannons with barrel weights alone reaching 2.5 tons. Unlike field artillery used in land battles against personnel, which were moved and towed by manpower or horsepower, these were designed as fixed-position anti-ship cannons targeting naval vessels, arranged around the entire perimeter. This equipment indicates that Benten Daiba was intended as a purely coastal defense battery. (Note: Coastal batteries, designed to counter naval artillery mounted in large numbers on ships capable of freely moving across the sea with propulsion, required anti-ship cannons with comparable firepower and range.)

== History of the Original Benten Daiba and Events Leading to Its Reconstruction ==
Benten Daiba is located at the tip of Benten Misaki (弁天岬), a cape extending north from Mount Hakodate. Due to its position at the entrance of the crescent-shaped Hakodate Bay, a Japanese-style battery relying on traditional gunnery had been established for coastal defense since the era of Matsumae Domain rule. (Note: From "Hokumon Shiko (北門史綱)", Volume 1, in 1850, Daijima Gohei (代嶋剛平), a Matsumae Domain clansman based in Hakodate, proposed the reconstruction of three batteries, Benten Misaki Daiba (弁天岬台場), Yamase Domari daiba (山背泊台場), and Otsuke Daiba (押付台場), located on the western side of Mount Hakodate. Daijima later came under the command of the Hakodate Magistrate (箱館奉行) and was involved in the reconstruction of Benten Daiba, which began in 1856.) However, as of October 1854, just before the shogunate's direct control, the personnel assigned to Benten Daiba consisted of only one samurai, two retainers, and six foot soldiers, making it merely one among many batteries and far from a significant force. (Note: In fact, Yamase Domari Daiba, which was later abandoned, had more personnel assigned than Benten Daiba at the time (Yamase Domari Daiba: 1 samurai, 3 retainers, 9 foot soldiers).)

With the opening of Hakodate as a port in 1854 following Japan's opening to foreign trade, and the transfer of the surrounding area to shogunate control, the Hakodate Magistrate (箱館奉行), a distant administrative post, was reestablished. However, Hori Toshihiro (堀利煕), who arrived to assume this role, was concerned about several issues: the city of Hakodate, clinging to the foothills of Mount Hakodate, where ships anchored densely within the crescent-shaped bay, leaving no escape route in the event of conflict; the vulnerable coastal defense network composed of traditional Japanese-style batteries; the civilian homes and merchant shops in Hakodate's city center, intermingled with the Hakodate Magistrate's office; and the fact that foreigners, permitted to roam freely after the port's opening, could openly observe these defenses (sometimes even the magistrate's facilities from atop Mount Hakodate).

Hori meticulously documented this situation and, in September of the same year, submitted a report to the shogunate to address Hakodate's critical circumstances. He argued that leaving the area in its current state—a place that could be "Ippō-Hunsai(一炮粉虀, reduced to dust with a single cannon shot)"—would undermine morale, making it difficult not only for himself but also for subordinates to relocate there with their families. As a solution, he requested the construction of a magistrate's office in Kameda (亀田) or Arikawa (有川, near present-day Hokuto City) on the opposite shore, concealed from external view and with a secure escape route.

Three months later, in December 1854, Hori, together with his newly arrived colleague Takenouchi Yasunori (竹内保徳), jointly reported to the shogunate that the relocation site for the magistrate's office had been decided as the interior of Kameda. (Note: At this stage, regarding the magistrate's office earthworks, it is noted that "earthen ramparts should be constructed on all four sides," suggesting that a Japanese-style square earthwork was initially envisioned. The shift to adopting Western-style fortification methods as like the later Goryōkaku (五稜郭), a star shaped fort, occurred in a proposal submitted in December 1855.) Additionally, they raised another concern: a proposal to overhaul the network of coastal defense batteries around Hakodate.

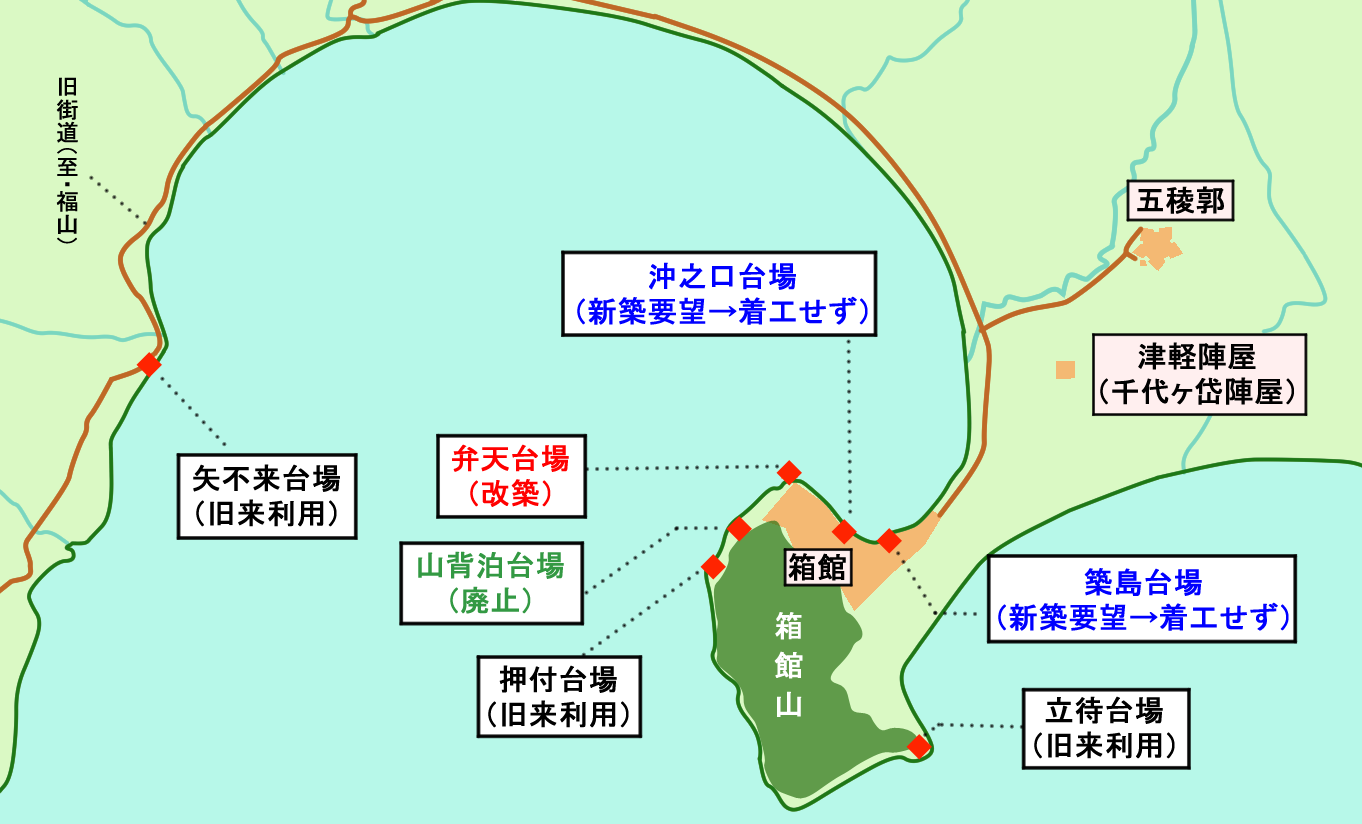
A plot showing the locations of batteries proposed for reconstruction or new construction as part of the coastal defense enhancement strategy for Hakodate Bay. Red text indicates Benten Daiba. Black represents existing batteries for which reconstruction was not approved. Blue denotes batteries proposed for new construction but never started due to budget shortages. The image is cited from Tokita Taivhiro 2025 "Was Goryokaku a "Bastion Fort"? - Analysis of the Actual State of Practice of 19th Century Western Military Science in Goryokaku with its Historical notability".

Prior to this proposal, Hori and his colleagues personally took a boat to survey the view from Hakodate Bay. What they observed was the defensive vulnerability of the Hakodate area, described as a "flat, sandy land" where the entire city, shops, and villages could be seen at a glance from the ship, with even the movements and actions of people coming and going clearly visible. Foreigners were already roaming freely outside the city, and their behavior, becoming a diplomatic issue, was increasingly difficult to regulate. Under such circumstances, strengthening the coastal defense network was an urgent priority. However, not only were the batteries themselves unable to be reinforced, but even the cannons could not be modernized. The existing cannons were covered to conceal them from foreign eyes, a makeshift measure to get by. Allowing the foreigners' audacity to continue unchecked left open the risk of conflict erupting at any moment. Driven by this sense of crisis, and anticipating the shogunate's financial difficulties, they requested the reconstruction or new construction of six batteries: four at advantageous existing locations and two new proposed sites.

These were the newly requested Tsukishima Daiba (築島台場) and Okinokuchi Daiba (沖之口台場) deep within Hakodate Bay, as well as the existing batteries on the opposite shore of Hakodate at Yafurai Daiba (矢不来台場), Ostsuke Daiba (押付台場) on the western side of Mount Hakodate, Tachimachi Daiba (立待台場) on the eastern side, and Benten Daiba.

== Budgeting and Initiation of the Reconstruction Plan ==
The relocation of the Hakodate Magistrate's Office and the overhaul of the coastal defense network were consolidated as measures to strengthen the Hakodate region. Ultimately, the following were budgeted:

- Relocation and new construction of the magistrate's office earthworks and buildings (later Goryōkaku) and the construction of administrative residences
- Flood control works around the magistrate's office
- Reconstruction of Benten Daiba and new construction of Tsukishima Daiba and Okinokuchi Daiba (Note: Of the six batteries proposed for overhaul, the remaining four were designated as follows: Otsuke Daiba and Tachimaci Daiba were to continue operating in their original state under the Nanbu Domain's supervision, while Yafurai Daiba was to remain in its original state under the Matsumae Domain's supervision.)

These were allocated a total budget of 400,000 ryō, to be paid in annual installments of 20,000 ryō over 20 years, with execution starting from 1856. The first project to commence was the reconstruction of Benten Daiba.

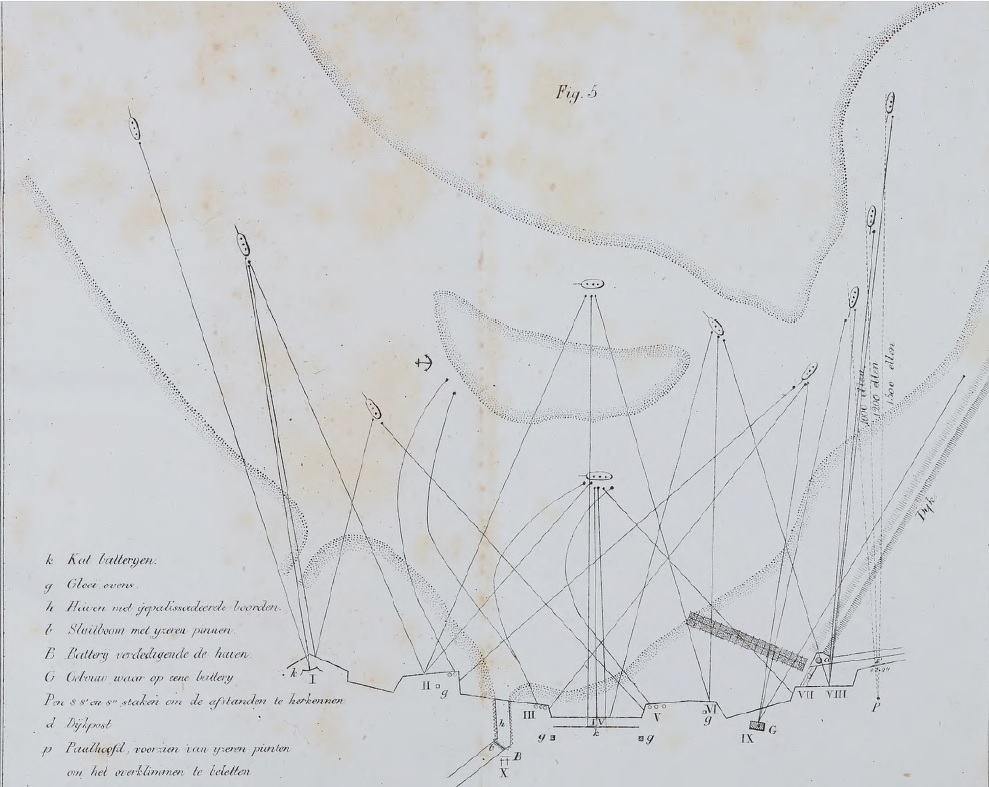
Engelberts' schematic diagram of a coastal defense network. A system that utilizes terrain, interweaving lines of fire from multiple batteries to counter the movement of warships.Had all of Hakodate's batteries been completed as planned, it is possible that such a coastal defense network could have been established in conjunction with the bay's topography.

The initial planned budget for Benten Daiba was 100,000 ryō, surpassing the 98,000 ryō allocated for the magistrate's office earthworks (later Goryōkaku). Additionally, 40,000 ryō for fifty 24-pound long cannons was included, matching the allocation for the magistrate's office earthworks. Combined with 45,000 ryō for the new construction of Tsukishima Daiba and 16,000 ryō for twenty cannons, plus 20,000 ryō for the construction of Okinokuchi Battery and 4,000 ryō for 5 cannons, the total amounted to 225,000 ryō. This suggests that the budget allocation and policy priorities at the time leaned slightly toward naval defense.

The initial plan included exactly 50 Cannon embrasures, each equipped with embrasures facing outward, indicating a design aligned with European military manuals on battery structures. The irregular hexagonal shape of the polygonal battery, located at the northern tip of Mount Hakodate at the entrance to the bay, was designed in coordination with the direction of gunfire from each side and the planned linkage with other coastal defense batteries (though this defense network was ultimately never completed). Considering these factors, it appears influenced by early European coastal defense theory manuals available in Japan at the time, notably J. M. Engelberts' Proeve eener verhandeling over de kustverdediging (Treatise on Coastal Defense), which is believed to have also been referenced in the design of Shinagawa Daiba (品川台場).

== Elements Omitted at Completion and Their Background ==
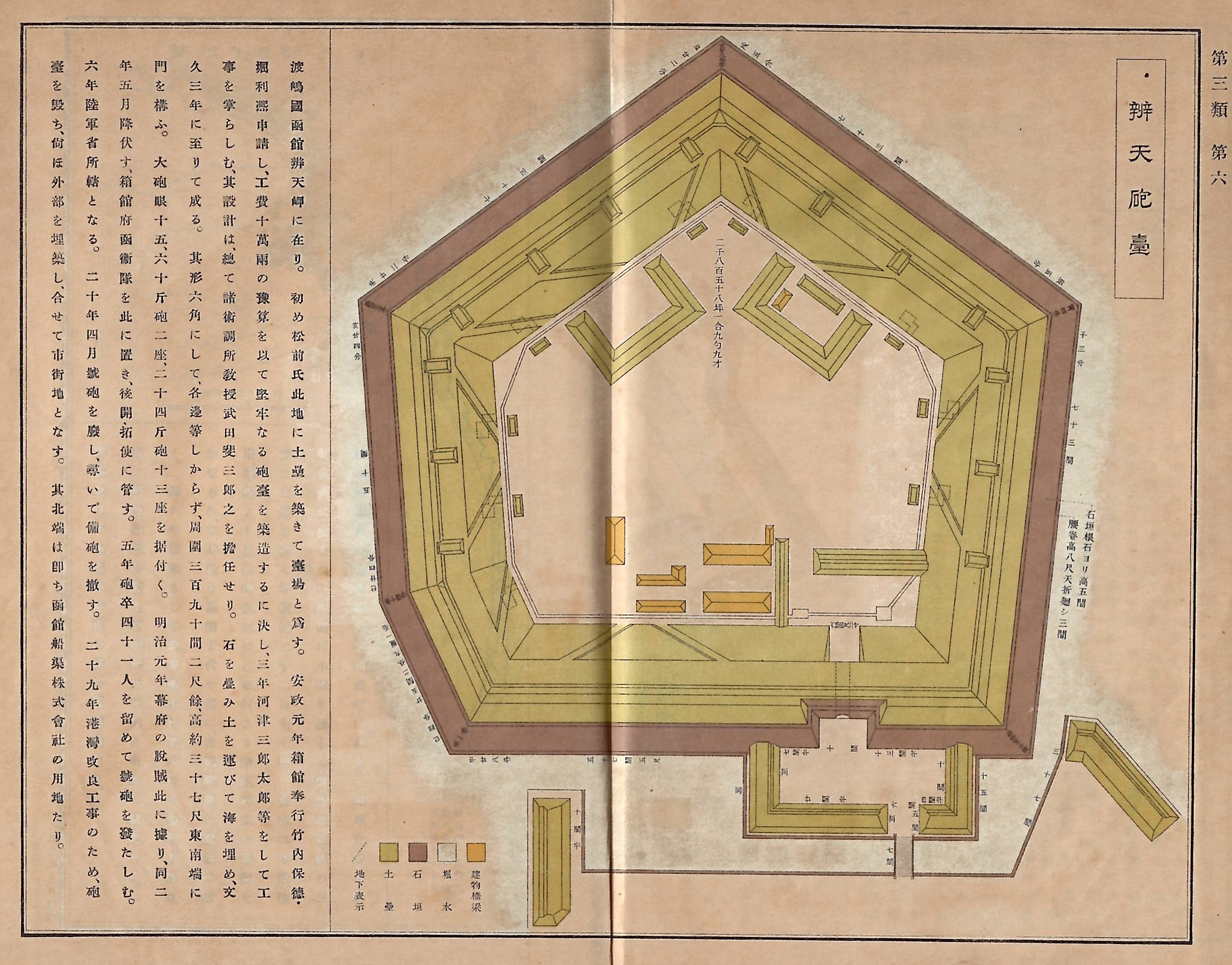
The Completed Plan of Benten Daiba. Cited from "北海道史 附録地図 (Hokkaido History Appendix Map)" 1918.

The construction of Benten Daiba, thus begun, was completed in 1863 at a total cost of 107,277 ryō for the battery and cannons. This accounted for approximately 80% of the 140,000 ryō budget allocated over the seven years of construction. (Note: As mentioned above, if the deployed cannons were provided by Russian donations rather than purchased, it would result in a slight deficit relative to the planned total construction cost of the battery itself.) However, the planned 50 cannons were reduced to 15, and as a result, no embrasures were built in the ramparts. Instead, as inferred from post-Boshin War plans and distant photographs, each cannon was mounted on a modern coastal gun carriage (新式海墩砲車) placed on rails, separated by 14 fortification walls, allowing for controlled firing angles and elevation over the ramparts.

Nevertheless, Benten Daiba can be considered relatively well-funded within the plan. Goryōkaku, with an initial budget of 138,000 ryō, was allocated only 44,855 ryō, roughly 30% of the planned amount, and had zero budget execution for cannons. The Hakodate Magistrate's office buildings and residences were allocated 44,854 ryō, three times the initially planned 15,000 ryō. Ultimately, with the completion of Goryōkaku in 1866, the annual installment payments were settled, and the Hakodate region development plan concluded after 11 years with a total expenditure of 215,000 ryō, approximately half of the original budget.

The background to this lies in several factors: the anticipated military confrontations with foreign powers, which were a concern at the outset of the plan, ultimately did not materialize, leading to a reduced priority for northern defense. As Japan's relations with foreign nations and the disparities between them became clearer after the country's opening, the establishment of the Nagasaki Naval Training School (長崎海軍伝習所 1855), followed by the creation of the Shogunate Army (幕府陸軍 1860) and Shogunate Navy (幕府海軍 1861), along with the purchase of warships for the navy, shifted focus. Rather than localized infrastructure projects like Goryōkaku and Benten Daiba, there was a growing need to strengthen the foundation of national defense capabilities through softer aspects—such as personnel training, technical education, and the establishment and development of military organizations—areas previously overlooked in traditional Japanese perspectives.

Consequently, the chronically cash-strapped shogunate, particularly amidst political upheavals centered far from the north, saw a decline in the priority of budget allocations for northern regions.

== From the Hakodate War to the Demise of Benten Daiba ==
Benten Daiba, originally constructed to protect Japan against foreign threats, ironically saw its actual operational use during the Hakodate War, the last phase of Boshin War, an internal conflict, due to the tumultuous historical developments following the Meiji Restoration and the ensuing civil war.

In October 1868, the former-shogunate forces, having landed at Washinoki, sent envoys to the Hakodate Governor, Shimizutani Kinnaru (清水谷公考), seeking mediation with the imperial court for the restoration of the Tokugawa family's status and permission for former-shogunate retainers to reside and develop Ezo as part of the new government. However, the Hakodate administration, along with the Matsumae and Hirosaki domains, had already resolved to intercept them and launched a night attack at Tōgeshita Village (峠下村), which was repelled. Judging that combat was now inevitable, Enomoto Takeaki (榎本武揚), Commander of Former-Shogunate Army, and his forces decided to advance, marking the outbreak of the Boshin War in Hakodate.

First, a unit led by Ōtori Keisuke (大鳥圭介) suppressed the Hakodate Plain area and occupied Goryōkaku (五稜郭) after Shimizutani and others fled Hakodate. At the same time, Benten Daiba was also occupied by the former-shogunate forces. After joining forces with Hijikata Toshizō (土方歳三) and others who had passed through the Kakkumi (川汲) Pass, they advanced against the Matsumae Domain, which maintained a hostile stance. Units led by Hijikata from the south and Matsuoka Shirōjirō (松岡四郎次郎) from the east subdued the domain, and with the escape of the domain lord Matsumae Noriihiro (松前徳広) to Aomori, control over Oshima peninsula was achieved. On December 15, 1868, 101 celebratory cannon shots were fired from warships anchored in Hakodate Port and from Benten Daiba to mark the occasion.

Enomoto entrusted a petition to French and British envoys, reiterating his original goals of "restoring the Tokugawa family's status and obtaining permission for former-shogunate retainers to reside and develop Ezo", awaiting imperial approval. However, on February 25, 1869, a court deliberation designated the former-shogunate forces as enemies of the court, ordering their subjugation, thus initiating the final battle of the Boshin War, known as the Kishi-no-Eki (己巳の役, Campaign of Tsuchinoto-mi Year)of Hakodate War. As of April 7, just before the start of this Campaign, Benten Daiba was defended by approximately 300 personnel under the command of the Hakodate Magistrate (under the former-shogunate regime), Nagai Genba (永井 玄蕃), including the Denshu-Shikan tai (伝習士官隊), the Hakodate Shinsengumi (箱館新撰組), artillery, and engineers.

Having lost two main warships, the Kaiyō (開陽) and Shinsoku (神速), just before the pacification of the Oshima Peninsula the previous year, the former-shogunate forces lacked naval strength. Following the first landing of government troops at Otobe on April 9, they allowed the new government fleet to advance eastward along the coast, and on April 24, the fleet finally penetrated Hakodate Bay. Benten Daiba, alongside three allied ships—Kaiten (回天) Maru, Hanryō (蟠龍), and Chiyodagata (千代田形)—engaged five new government warships that entered the bay. The battery continued to respond to attacks by the new government fleet on April 26, May 3, and May 7.

Following the defeat at the Battle of Yafurai (矢不来の戦い) (Note: The clash at Yafurai Daiba (矢不来台場), a key stronghold for the defense of the Tsugaru Strait coast, was intense. Ōtori Keisuke had prepared by reinforcing land fortifications and adding mountain-top batteries, holding his own in land combat. However, with the new government forces fully controlling the sea, he was overwhelmed by supporting bombardments from their entire fleet and ultimately defeated.) on April 28, the former-shogunate army's land forces defending various routes withdrew to Goryōkaku. The new government forces progressively deployed troops, and on May 11, with encirclement complete on both the front and rear, they launched a full-scale land and sea assault. The city came under the occupation of the new government forces, cutting off communication with Goryōkaku. Isolated amidst the enemy, Benten Daiba faced intense attacks from both land and sea.

On May 14, Ikeda Jirōbei (池田次郎兵衛), a Satsuma Domain military inspector from the new government, met with Suwa Tsuneichi (諏訪常吉), who was being treated at the Hakodate Hospital (箱館病院) under Takamatsu Ryōun (高松凌雲). Ikeda entrusted Suwa's message to two other wounded former-shogunate soldiers, Takahashi Yoshirō (高橋与四郎) and Ina Hanjirō (伊奈半次郎), who were sent by small boat to Benten Daiba to urge surrender through these two intermediaries. In response, on May 15, the Benten Daiba garrison ceased resistance. The fighting ended before the conclusion of the Hakodate War on May 18.

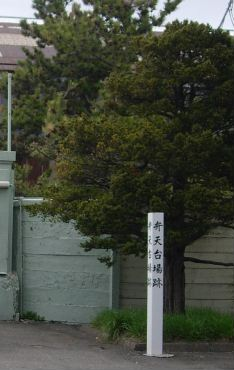
Monument at the Site of Benten Daiba

Subsequently, Benten Daiba came under the jurisdiction of the Hokkaido Development Agency, and in 1872, 41 artillerymen were stationed there, with the battery used thereafter for firing signal cannons. In 1873, it was transferred to the Ministry of the Army's control, and in 1887, the use of signal cannons was discontinued, and the deployed cannons were removed. In 1896, the battery was demolished for port improvement works.

Today, only a monument stands in front of the entrance to premises of "Hakodate Dock (函館どつく)". The stone materials from the dismantled Benten Daiba were reused as materials for the breakwater at the Hakodate Fishing Port's ship entrance, Called Hakodate-Gyoko Hune-iri-ma Bouha-Tei (函館漁港船入澗防波堤). In 2004, the Japan Society of Civil Engineers (土木学会) designated it as part of the "Hakodate Port Improvement Facilities Group" as a Selected Civil Engineering Heritage. Additionally, in 2006 (Heisei 18), it was recognized by the Fisheries Agency and the National Conference of Fishing Ports and Fishing Grounds as one of the "100 Historical and Cultural Assets of Fisheries and Fishing Villages to Be Preserved for the Future".
