= Sanada Yukimoto =

Japanese daimyō

Sanada Yukimoto 真田幸民
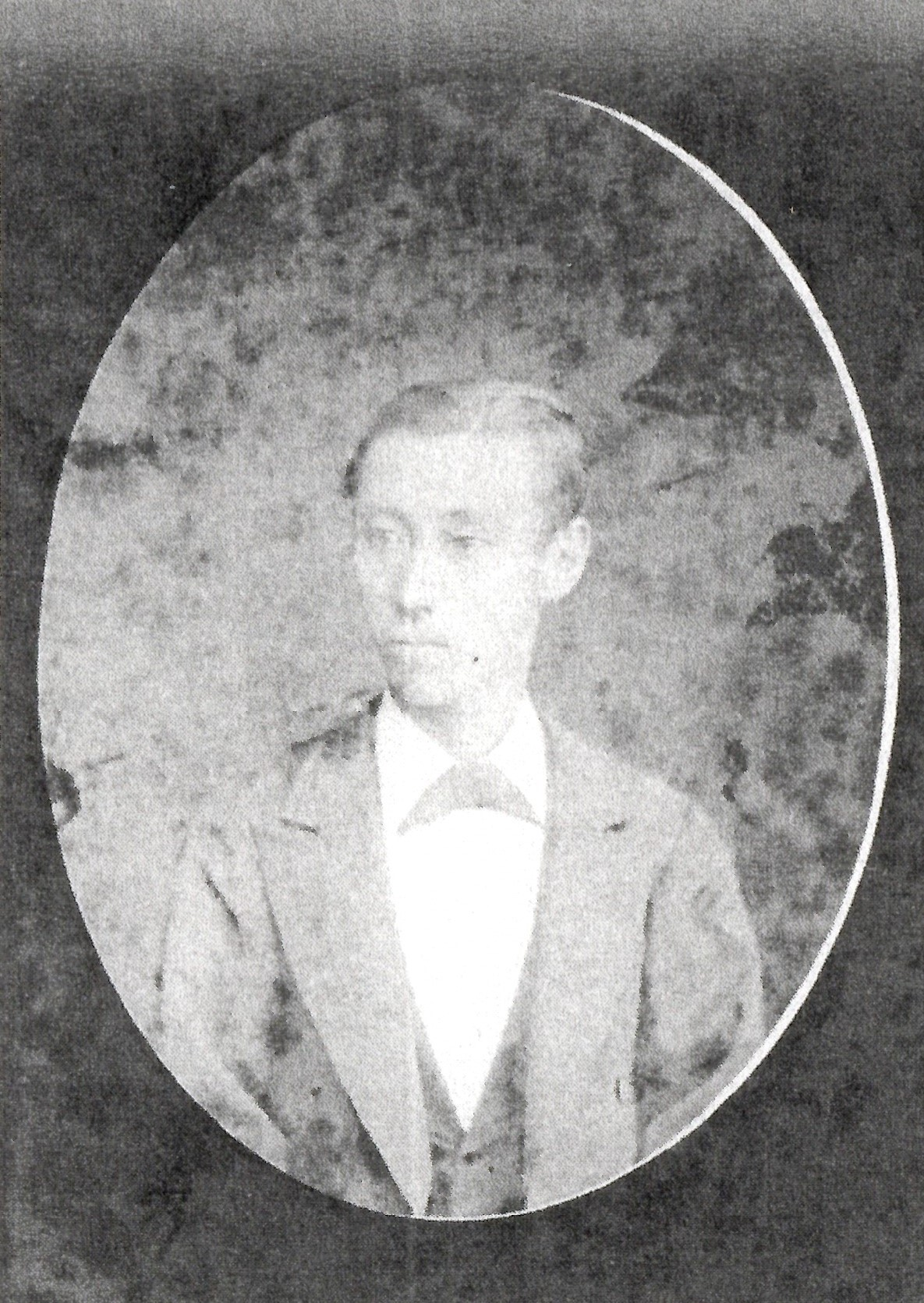
- Born: March 28, 1850
- Died: September 8, 1903 (aged 53)
- Occupation: Daimyō of Matsushiro Domain (1866-1871)
- Father: Date Munenari

Sanada Yukimoto (真田幸民; March 28, 1850 – September 8, 1903) was the 10th (and final) Sanada daimyō of Matsushiro Domain in Shinano Province, Honshū, Japan (modern-day Nagano Prefecture). His pre-Meiji period courtesy title was Shinano-no-kami, and he eventually rose to the Court rank was Second Rank.

== Biography ==
Sanada Yukimoto was born as the eldest son of Date Munenari of Uwajima Domain, and was adopted as heir to the childless Sanada Yukinori, becoming daimyō when the latter retired in 1866. During the Boshin War, he supported the imperial side and was ordered to lead imperial forces against the Tokugawa stronghold of Kōfu Castle in Kai Province. He subsequently fought in the Battle of Hokuetsu and Battle of Aizu, and the domain was awarded an increase in kokudaka of 30,000 koku for its efforts. In 1869, the title of daimyō was abolished, and he was appointed imperial governor of Matsushiro. However, the following year, the peasants rose in a large scale revolt protesting taxes, corrupt officials and inflation. The result was suppressed with great difficulty over the course of a year. In 1871, he relinquished his title and relocated to Tokyo with the abolition of the han system.

In April 1872, Yukimoto departed Yokohama for Europe and the United States, returning in January 1873. In 1884 he was awarded the title of viscount (shisaku) in the new kazoku peerage system and the Order of the Rising Sun, 3rd class. His title was elevated to count (hakushaku) in 1891. He died in Tokyo in 1903 at the age of 53.

Yukimoto was married three times. His first wife was a younger daughter of Ōmura Sumihiro of Ōmura Domain, his second wife was a daughter of Ito Suketomo of Obi Domain and his third wife was an adopted daughter of Shimazu Hisamitsu of Satsuma Domain. His heir, Sanada Yukimasa, was from his third wife.

Preceded by Sanada Yukinori	10th Daimyo of Matsushiro; 1866-1871	Succeeded by -
