= Matsushiro, Nagano =

Dissolved municipality in Hanishina district, Nagano prefecture, Japan

Coordinates: 36.566°N 138.196°E

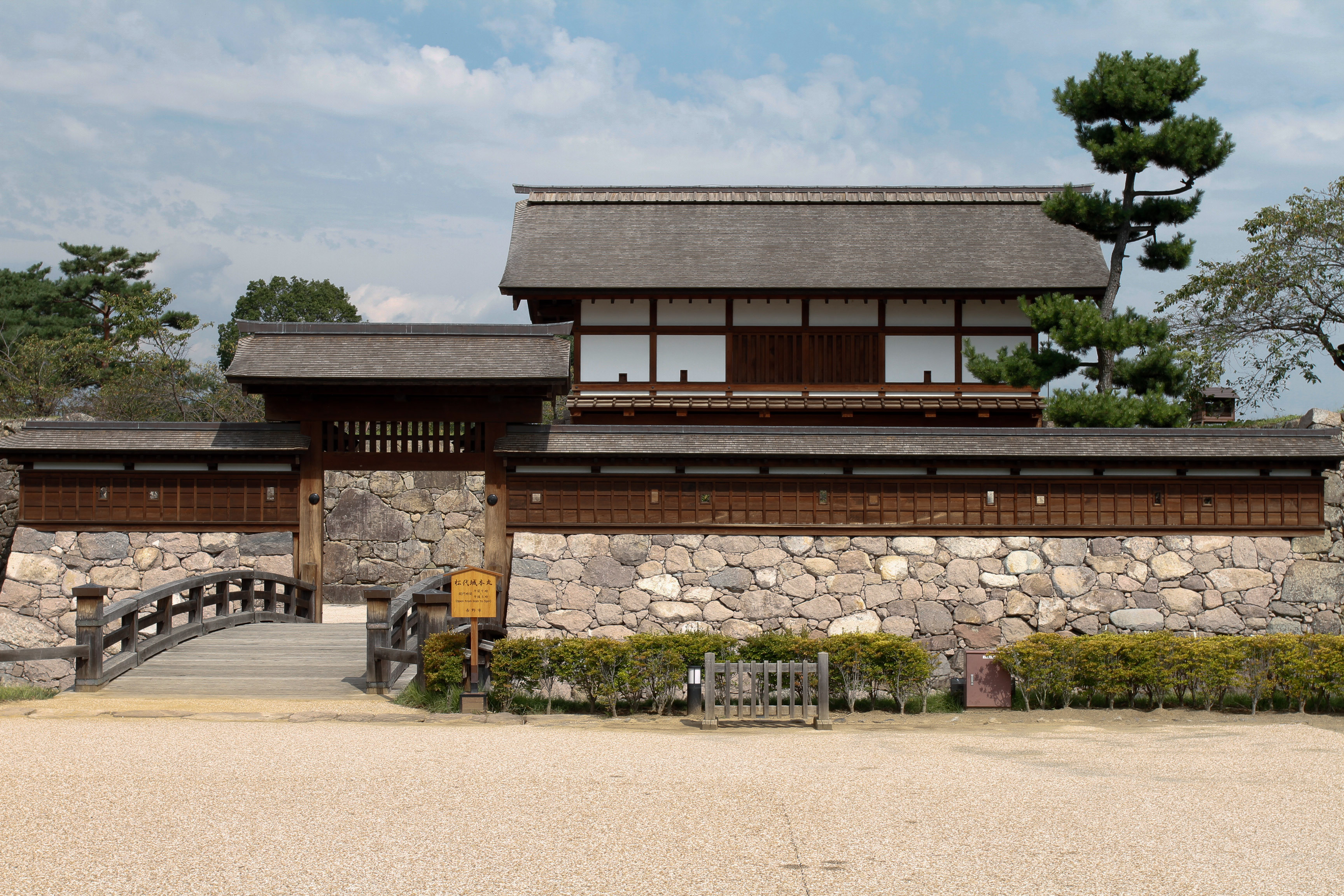
Matsushiro Castle Remains

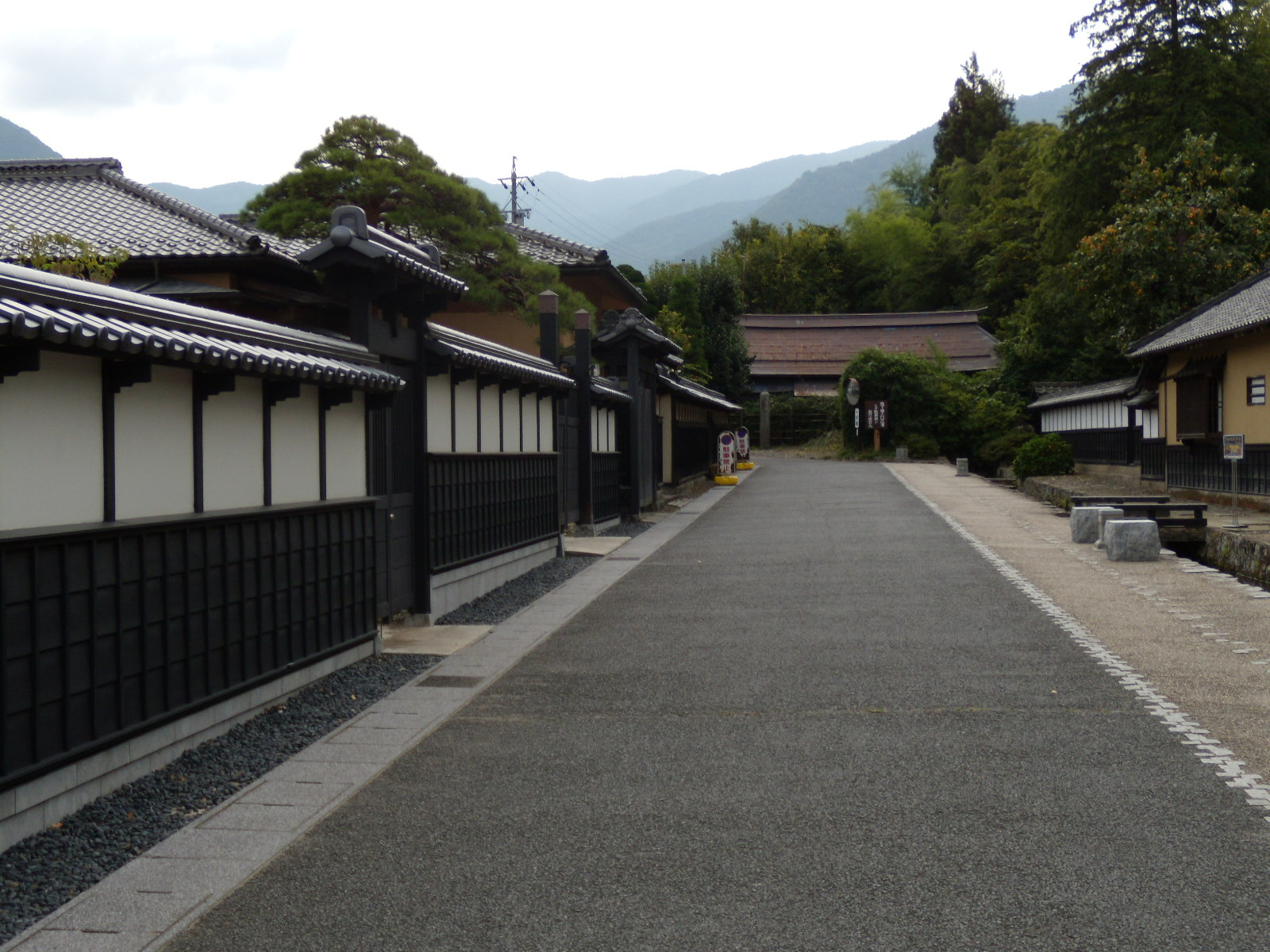
A traditional street in Matsushiro

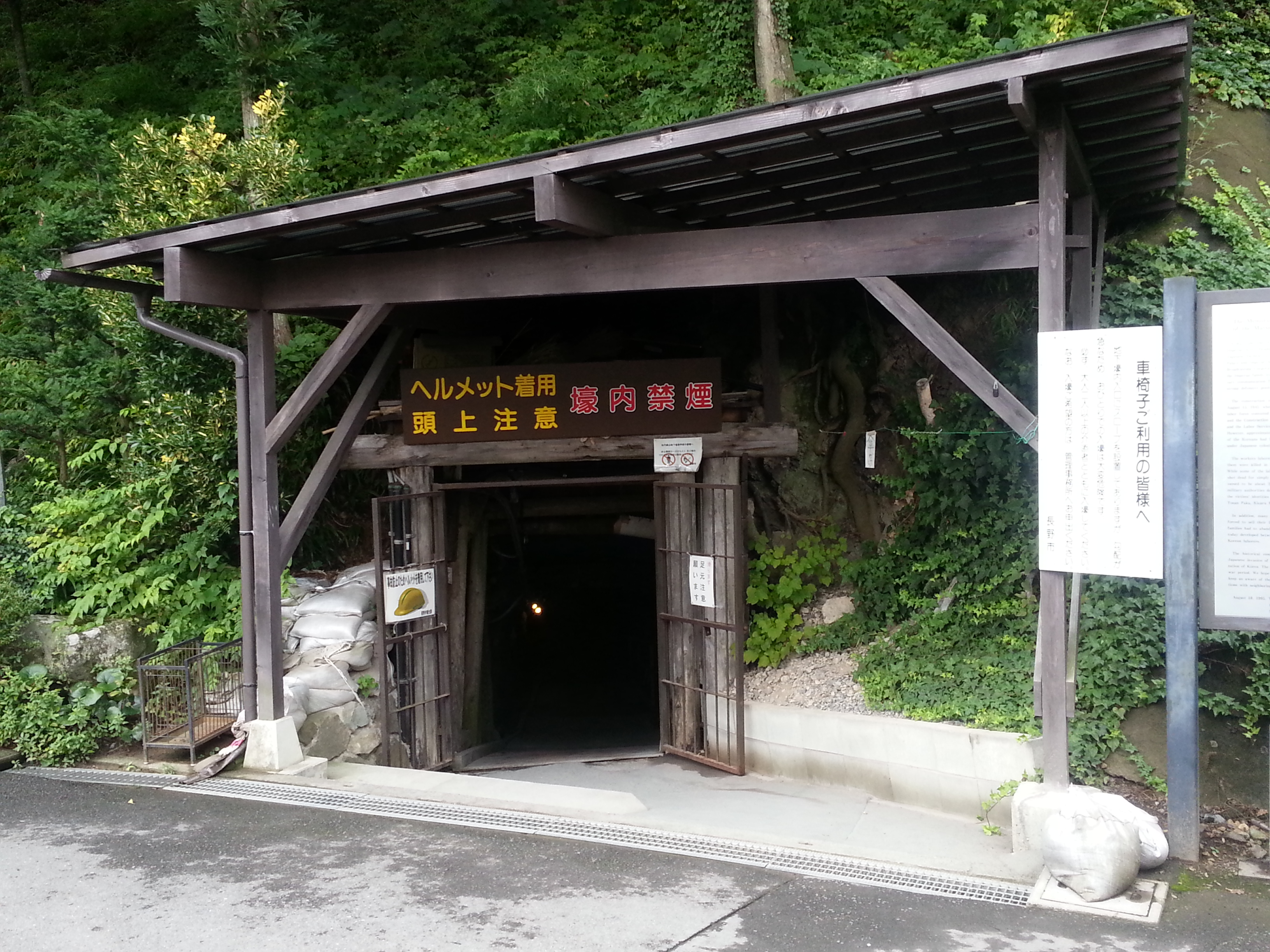
Zozan Cave of the planned Imperial Headquarters is open for public

Matsushiro (Japanese: 松代) was a historically important town in Hanishina District, Nagano Prefecture, Japan. In 1966, it was incorporated into Nagano City.

== In general ==
Matsushiro was a thriving town as the center of Matsushiro Domain under the Sanada clan during the Edo period of the 17th to 19th centuries. In the Meiji period of the latter half of the 19th century, there was a thriving silk industry there and the area was known for its Matsushiro ware.

During the last days of World War II, Matsushiro Underground Imperial Headquarters was built in the caves of the near-by mountain. In 1966, Matsushiro was incorporated into Nagano City, and remains as Matsushiro-machi, Nagano City.

Matsushiro is now famous as a thriving sightseeing area.

== Transportation ==
About three kilometers south on Prefectural Road 35 (長野県道35号長野真田線) from Nagano Station of Hokuriku Shinkansen, Shinetsu Main Line and Shinano Railway Line. About one kilometer south on Prefectural Road 35 from Nagano Interchange (長野インターチェンジ) of Jōshin-etsu Expressway.

== What to see ==
- Matsushiro Castle
- Matsushiro Underground Imperial Headquarters - Caves in Mt. Minakami (皆神山)
- Bunbu School (文武学校) - the official school of Matsushiro Domain
- The Sanada Treasure Museum (真田宝物館)
- Mt. Saijo (妻女山) - a mountain where Uesugi Kenshin of Echigo Province had his battle headquarters in the famous Battles of Kawanakajima
- Matsushiro Hot Spring (松代温泉)

== People of Matsushiro ==
- Sanada Yukimura
- Sarutobi Sasuke - a ninja, one of the Sanada Ten Braves
- Zozan Sakuma - a 19th-century scientist
- Yasuhiro Kobayashi, also called "coba" - an accordionist
- Matsui Sumako - actress

== See also ==
- Matsushiro Domain
