= Goryōkaku =

Star fort in Hakodate, Japan

- 五稜郭
- Part of Boshin War
- Near Hakodate in Japan
- Goryōkaku viewed from Goryōkaku Tower

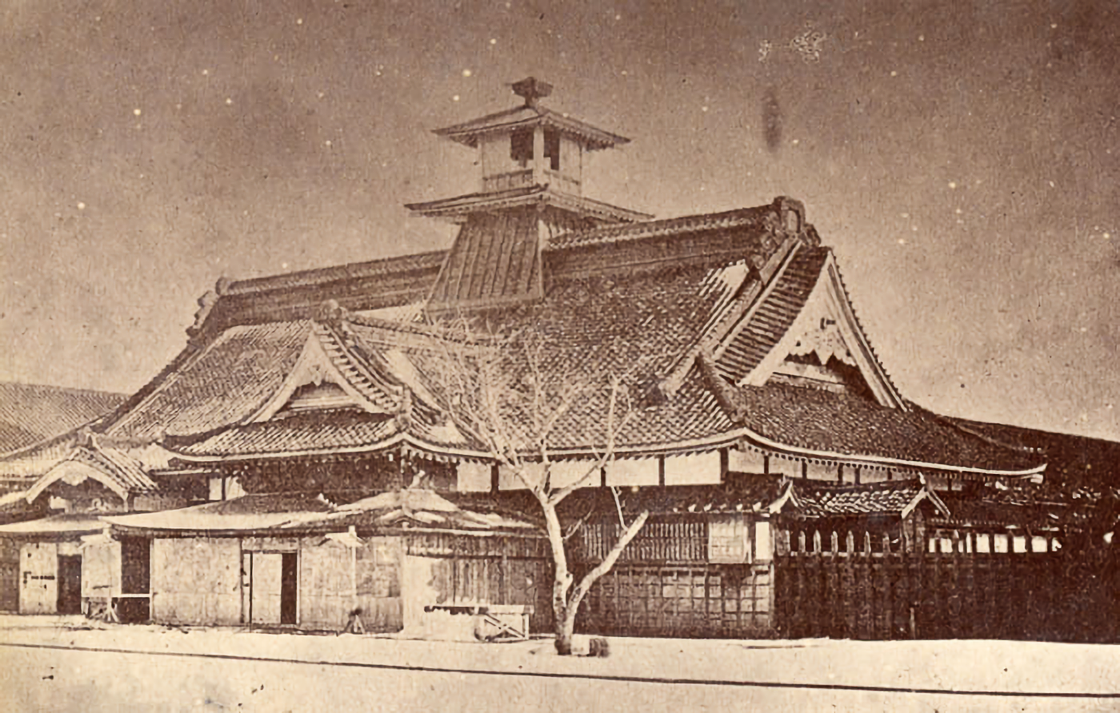
- Governmental hall of the Republic of Ezo

Site information
- Type: Star fort

Location
- Location within Japan
- Coordinates: 41°47′49″N 140°45′25″E

Site history
- Built: 1866
- Built by: Takeda Ayasaburō
- Battles/wars: Boshin War

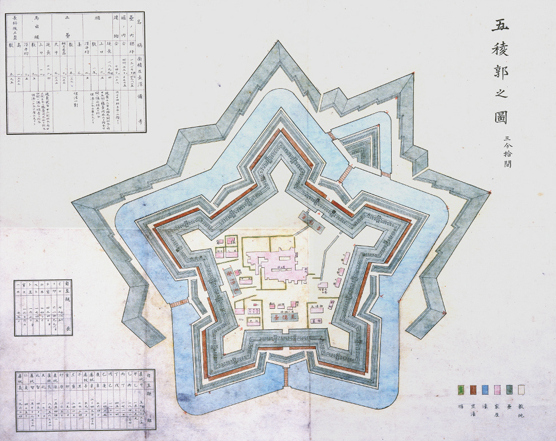
19th century map of Goryōkaku

Goryōkaku (五稜郭; lit. 'five-point fort') is a star fort in the Japanese city of Hakodate on the island of Hokkaido. The fortress was completed in 1866. It was the main headquarters of the short-lived Republic of Ezo.

== History ==
Goryōkaku was designed in 1855 by Takeda Ayasaburō, a Rangaku scholar. He studied the fortified cities of Europe in the early modern period to design a fort that could protect against battles using guns and cannons.After seven years of construction, the fortress was completed in 1866, two years before the end of the Tokugawa shogunate. Its shape, resembling a five-pointed star, allow greater numbers of gun emplacements on its walls than a traditional Japanese fortress and reduce the number of blind spots where cannons could not fire.

The fort was originally intended to defend the Tsugaru Strait south of Hakodate. Following the end of the Tokugawa shogunate, it served as the capitol of the Republic of Ezo, a state that existed only in 1869, and was the site of the week-long last battle of the Boshin War between the Republic and the Empire of Japan.

After the war, most of the buildings were torn down due to their association with the Tokugawa shogunate and the Tokugawa-allied rebels, and the fortress was left unused. The moat was used for collecting ice in the winter, forming a considerable commercial industry. The ice was sold on Honshu under the name "Goryōkaku Ice".

== Park ==
Goryōkaku became a park in 1914 and was declared as a Special Historical Site in 1952. Nowadays it is part of Hakodate city museum and houses numerous cherry trees, being a famous spot for cherry-blossom viewing in spring.

Next to Goryōkaku is an observation tower and a visitor center, built in 2006. The tower offers a birds-eye view of the fortress, the surrounding city and Mount Hakodate, in addition to an exhibition about the history of the fortress and the various people associated with it. Majorly featured is Hijikata Toshizō, who has multiple statues within the tower.

While all but one of the historical buildings in Goryōkaku were torn down after the war, a partial reconstruction of its main building – the magistrate's office – has been built. Planning and archaeological investigation started in 1985, construction began in 2006, and the building was finished in 2010. The reconstructed magistrate's office houses an exhibition about the history of the building as the Tokugawa shogunate's brief administrative center of Hokkaido, Goryōkaku as a whole, and the reconstruction process. The Republic of Ezo is given less attention at the exhibition.

== See also ==
- List of Special Places of Scenic Beauty, Special Historic Sites and Special Natural Monuments
- Benten Daiba, another key fortress of the Republic of Ezo
- Hekirichi Bastion Fort, a predecessor to the Goryokaku bastion fortress and the first star fort in Japan (built in 1855).
- Citadel Hill, a similar shaped fortress in Nova Scotia, Canada
- Fort Bourtange, a similarly shaped fortress in the Netherlands
- List of foreign-style castles in Japan
- Palmanova
