= Sanada Yukinori =

- 真田幸教
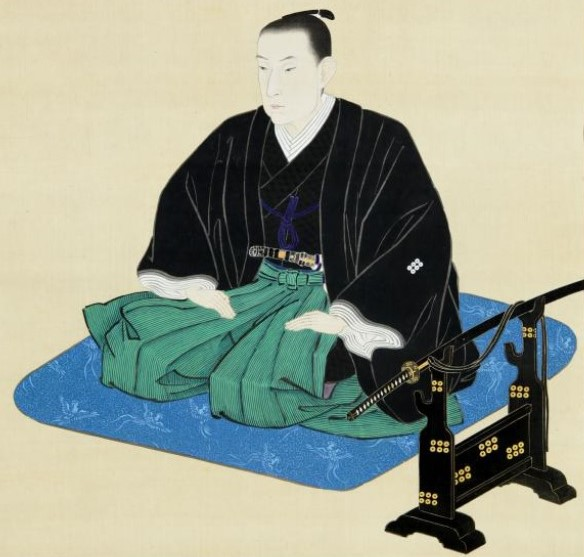
- Sanada Yukinori, portrait at Sanada Museum, Matsushiro

7th Daimyō of Matsushiro Domain
- In office 1852–1866
- Monarchs: Shōgun: Tokugawa Ieyoshi; Tokugawa Iesada; Tokugawa Ieshige
- Preceded by: Sanada Yukitsura
- Succeeded by: Sanada Yukimoto

Personal details
- Born: January 30, 1836
- Died: November 21, 1869 (aged 33)
- Spouse(s): Haru, daughter of Matsudaira Yorihiro of Takamatsu Domain
- Parent: Sanada Yukiyoshi (father)

Sanada Yukinori (真田幸教, January 30, 1836 – November 21, 1869) was the 7th Sanada daimyō of Matsushiro Domain in Shinano Province, Honshū, Japan (modern-day Nagano Prefecture), under the Bakumatsu period Tokugawa shogunate. His courtesy title was Shinano-no-kami, Izu-no-kami, and finally Ukyō-no-daifu, and his Court rank was Junior Fourth Rank, Lower Grade.

== Biography ==
Sanada Yukinori was the eldest son of Sanada Yukiyoshi (1814-1844), the son and heir of Sanada Yukitsura, but as he was still a minor when his father died, his grandfather Sanada Yukitsura initially came out of retirement to act as regent. He assumed the duties of daimyō in 1852; however, the following year, the Perry Expedition landed at Uraga, demanding an end to Japan's national isolation policy. Matsushiro Domain was ordered to provide troops to guard the approaches to Edo from the south, and subsequently to guard Yokohama and to build and man the No.6 gun battery in Edo Bay. These demands were a severe strain on the domain's finances, and the domain's retainers were violently split between supporters of the Tokugawa shogunate and supporters of the imperial cause. Due to Yukinori's youth and poor health, he was barely able to prevent open conflict within the domain, and although the domain had a prominent reformer, Sakuma Shōzan, Yukinori was unable to prevent his assassination. In 1863, when Shogun Tokugawa Ieshige decided to go to Kyoto, Sanada Yorinori was ordered to report to Yokohama in person to take responsibility for the defenses of the Port of Yokohama. Unwilling to go, he decided to retire and in 1866, after reviewing several possible candidates, selected the eldest son of Date Munenari of Uwajima Domain as his heir.

He was married to a daughter of Matsudaira Yorihiro of Takamatsu Domain, but had no heir. However, after his retirement, he quickly had four sons by as many concubines, and one of these sons, Sanada Yukiyo (1870-1948) was ennobled with the title of baron (danshaku) for his services in the First Sino-Japanese War. Sanada Yukinori died in 1869 at the age of 34.
