= Takeda Ayasaburō =

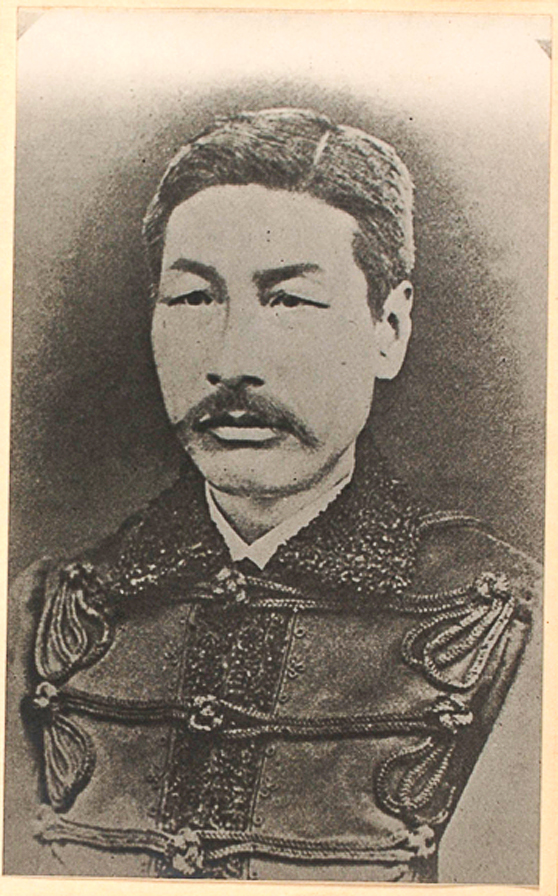
Takeda Ayasaburō

Takeda Ayasaburō (武田 斐三郎; November 4, 1827 - January 28, 1880), was a Japanese Rangaku scholar, and the architect of the fortress of Goryōkaku in Hokkaidō.

Takeda was born in the Ōzu Domain (modern-day Ōzu, Ehime) in 1827. He studied medicine, Western sciences (rangaku), navigation, military architecture. He was a student of Ogata Kōan and Sakuma Shōzan. In 1854 he was ordered to the island of Hokkaidō to reinforce the military infrastructure.

He built the fortresses of Goryōkaku and Benten Daiba between 1854 and 1866, using Dutch books on military architecture, and also established a school. He also practiced sailing with the Hakodate Maru, one of Japan's first Western-style sailing ship, together with his students. He sailed to Russia with the ship, and engaged in some exchanges.
