= Matsushiro Domain =

Japanese historical estate in Shinano province

Matsushiro Domain (1616–1871) 松代藩 Kawanakajima Domain (1600–1610) 川中島藩
- under Tokugawa shogunate Japan
- 1600–1610; 1616–1618; 1619–1871
- Capital: Matsushiro Castle
- Area
  - Coordinates: 36.566°N 138.196°E
  - Type: Daimyō
- Historical era: Edo period
  - Established: 1600
  - Disestablished: 1871
- Today part of: part of Nagano Prefecture

Matsushiro Castle

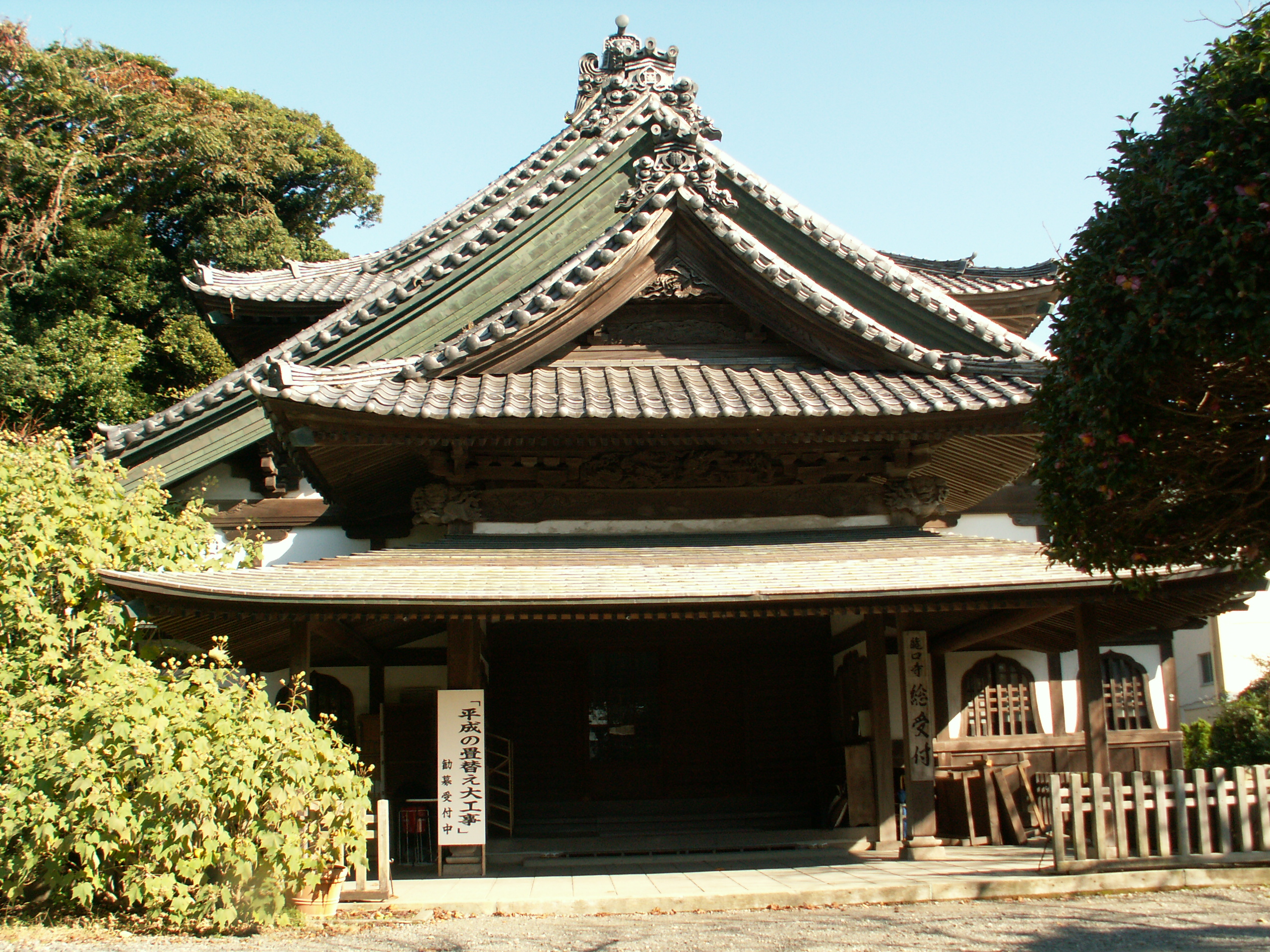
Part of the Matsushiro domain's Edo estate, relocated to Kamakura and used as a hall at Ryuko-ji Temple

Matsushiro Domain (松代藩, Matsushiro-han) was a feudal domain under the Tokugawa shogunate of Edo period Japan. It is located in Shinano Province, Honshū. The domain was centered at Matsushiro Castle, located in what is now part of the city of Nagano in Nagano Prefecture.

== History ==
Kawanakajima in northern Shinano Province was the site of numerous battles in the Sengoku period between Takeda Shingen and Uesugi Kenshin. After the start of the Tokugawa shogunate, this area was awarded as a domain to Mori Tadamasa for his efforts in the Battle of Sekigahara by Tokugawa Ieyasu. The marked the start of the 137,000 koku Kawanakajima Domain. Mori was transferred three years later to Tsuyama Domain in Mimasaka Province in 1603. The domain was then awarded in 1610 to Matsudaira Tadateru, the 6th son of Tokugawa Ieyasu; however, he was dispossessed in 1606 and the domain was suppressed.

In 1616, Matsudaira Tadamasa, the son of Yūki Hideyasu was awarded a 130,000 koku holding in northern Shinano, and chose Matsushiro as the location for his castle. The marked the start of Matsushiro Domain. He was transferred to Takada Domain in Echigo Province after only three years, and the domain went to Sakai Tadakatsu, who was in turn transferred to Shonai Domain in Dewa Province in 1622.

The Sanada clan had ruled the neighbouring Chiisagata District in Shinano Province during the Sengoku period under the Takeda clan and subsequently most of northern Shinano and Kōzuke Province as retainers of Toyotomi Hideyoshi. Following the establishment of the Tokugawa shogunate, Sanada Nobuyuki was confirmed as daimyō with Ueda Domain, with holdings assessed at 95,000 koku. However, in 1622 he was transferred to Matsushiro Domain, with an increase in kokudaka to 120,000 koku. The Sanada clan remained in at Matsushiro until the Meiji restoration.

The domain was later reduced to 100,000 koku when Numata Domain in Kōzuke Province was split off as a separate domain. The Sanada enjoyed close ties with the ruling Tokugawa clan, as Sanada Nobuyuki married an adopted daughter of Tokugawa Ieyasu. Although classed as tozama daimyō, the Sanada were accorded the same status and privileges as fudai daimyō in their audiences with the Shōgun, and received significant financial assistance when Matsushiro Castle was destroyed by a fire in 1717, and when the castle town was ravaged by a flood in 1742. A han school was founded in 1758, and the 8th daimyō, Sanada Yukitsura, served as a rōjū. However, towards the Bakumatsu period, the domain suffered from financial difficulties. The Zenkoji earthquake of 1847 destroyed most of the town, and the domain's finances were depleted by demands from the shogunate for guard duty in Edo Bay against the return of Perry's "blackships". The Bakumatsu period reformer Sakuma Shōzan was a samurai from Matsushiro domain, and many of the domain's samurai supported his efforts toward modernization of the domain's military.

During the Boshin War, the domain was one of the first in Shinano to side with the imperial cause, and sent forces to fight in the Battle of Hokuetsu and Battle of Aizu. In July 1871, with the abolition of the han system, Matsushiro Domain briefly became Matsushiro Prefecture, and was merged into the newly created Nagano Prefecture. Under the new Meiji government, Sanada Yukimoto, the last daimyo of Matsushiro Domain was given the kazoku peerage title of shishaku (viscount), and was later elevated to hakushaku (count).

== Bakumatsu period holdings ==
As with most domains in the han system, Matsushiro Domain consisted of several discontinuous territories calculated to provide the assigned kokudaka, based on periodic cadastral surveys and projected agricultural yields.

- Shinano Province
  - 102 villages in Minochi District
  - 26 villages in Hanishina District
  - 117 villages in Sarashina District

== List of daimyō ==
=== As Kawanakajima Domain ===
#	Name	Tenure	Courtesy title	Court Rank	kokudaka	Notes
Mori clan (tozama) 1600-1603
1	Mori Tadamasa (森忠政)	1600-1603	Ukon-no-taifu (右近大夫); Jijū (侍従)	Junior 4th Rank, Lower Grade (従四位下)	137,000 koku	transfer to Tsuyama Domain
Matsudaira clan (shinpan) 1603-1610
1	Matsudaira Tadateru (松平忠輝)	1603-1610	Sakon-shosho (左近衛少将)	Junior 4th Rank, Lower Grade (従四位下)	140,000 koku	transfer to Takada Domain

=== As Matsushiro Domain ===
#	Name	Tenure	Courtesy title	Court Rank	kokudaka	Notes
Matsudaira clan (shinpan) 1616-1618
1	Matsudaira Tadamasa (松平忠昌)	1616-1618	Iyo-no-kami (伊予守)	Junior 5th Rank, Lower Grade (従五位下)	120,000 koku	Transfer to Takada Domain
Sakai clan (fudai) 1619-1622
1	Sakai Tadakatsu (酒井忠勝)	1619-1622	Iyo-no-kami (宮内大輔)	Junior 4th Rank, Lower Grade (従四位下)	100,000 koku	Transfer to Shōnai Domain
Sanada clan (tozama) 1622-1871
1	Sanada Nobuyuki (真田信之)	1622-1656	Izu-no-kami (伊豆守)	Junior 5th Rank, Lower Grade (従五位下)	135,000->100,000 koku	transfer from Ueda Domain
2	Sanada Nobumasa (真田信政)	1656-1658	Naiki (内記)	Junior 5th Rank, Lower Grade (従五位下)	100,000 koku	
3	Sanada Yukimichi (真田幸道)	1658-1727	Izu-no-kami (伊豆守)	Junior 5th Rank, Lower Grade (従五位下)	100,000 koku	
4	Sanada Nobuhiro (真田信弘)	1727-1736	Izu-no-kami (伊豆守)	Junior 5th Rank, Lower Grade (従五位下)	100,000 koku	
5	Sanada Nobuyasu (真田信安)	1737-1752	Izu-no-kami (伊豆守)	Junior 5th Rank, Lower Grade (従五位下)	100,000 koku	
6	Sanada Yukihiro (真田幸弘)	1752-1798	Ukyō-no-daifu (右京大夫)	Junior 4th Rank, Lower Grade (従四位下)	100,000 koku	
7	Sanada Yukitaka (真田幸専)	1798-1823	Danjō-daisuke (弾正大弼)	Junior 4th Rank, Lower Grade (従四位下)	100,000 koku	
8	Sanada Yukitsura (真田幸貫)	1823-1852	Ukyō-no-daifu (右京大夫)	Junior 4th Rank, Lower Grade (従四位下)	100,000 koku	
9	Sanada Yukinori (真田幸教)	1852-1866	Ukyō-no-daifu (右京大夫)	Junior 4th Rank, Lower Grade (従四位下)	100,000 koku	
10	Sanada Yukimoto (真田幸民)	1866-1871	Shinano-no-kami (信濃守)	2nd Rank (従二位)	100,000 koku	

== See also ==
List of Han
