= Chōhō-ji (Kainan) =

Buddhist temple in Wakayama Prefecture, Japan

- 長保寺
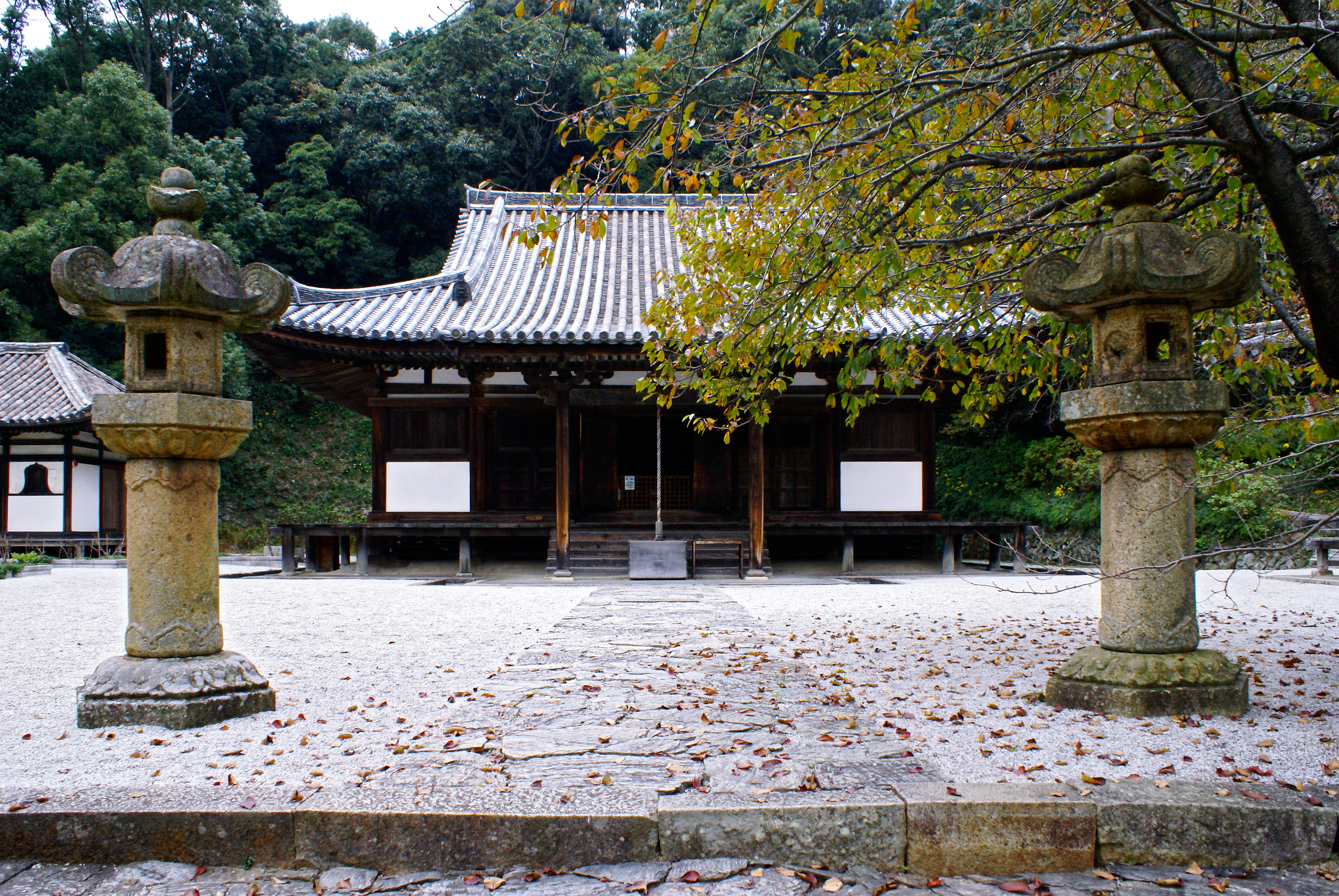
- Main hall

- Location within Wakayama Prefecture Location within Japan

Religion
- Affiliation: Tendai
- Deity: Shaka Nyorai

Location
- Location: Kainan, Wakayama Prefecture
- Country: Japan
- Coordinates: 34°06′33″N 135°09′56″E

Architecture
- Founder: Shōkū (性空)
- Established: 1000
- National Treasure of Japan

Website
- chohoji.or.jp

Chōhō-ji (Japanese: 長保寺) is a Buddhist temple in the city of Kainan, Wakayama Prefecture, Japan. It belongs to the Tendai school of Japanese Buddhism. Its main image is a statue of Shaka Nyorai. Its main hall, pagoda and daimon are National Treasures of Japan, and its daimyō cemetery is a National Historic Site.

== History ==
The early history of Chōhō-ji is not well-documented. Per the temple's own account, it was founded by a disciple of Ennin in the year 1000 at the request of Emperor Ichijō. Originally, it was situated to the west of its current location, and was relocated the Kamakura period. The existing main hall, pagoda and daimon were built between the Kamakura and Nanboku-chō periods. The temple declined during the Sengoku period, but was revived in the early Edo period under the sponsorship of Asano Yoshinaga, daimyō of the Kishū Domain.

In 1666, Tokugawa Yorinobu, who had replaced the Asano clan as daimyō, made Chōhō-ji the bodaiji of the Kishū Tokugawa clan, and in 1672 Tokugawa Mitsusada donated estates with a kokudaka of 500 koku for the temple's upkeep. On the eastern slopes of the mountain behind the precincts, a large cemetery was created for the Kishū Tokugawa, with the exceptions of the tombs of the 5th daimyō (Tokugawa Yoshimune) and 13th daimyō (Tokugawa Iemochi), who (as shogun) were buried at Kan'ei-ji in Edo. There are 28 tombs in the cemetery, twelve of which are for various daimyō, and the remainder are their wives and children. Each tomb is surrounded by a stone fence, with a granite-paved floor and basalt approach and walls. The shape of the tombstone itself varies depending on the generation. There are also a total of 330 stone lanterns (tōrō).

== Cultural properties ==
=== National Treasures ===
- Main hall
- Pagoda
- Daimon

=== Important Cultural Properties ===
- Chinju-dō (鎮守堂; lit. 'Guardian Shrine Hall')

=== Historic Sites ===
- Grave site (墓所, bosho) of the Kishū Tokugawa family

== Gallery ==
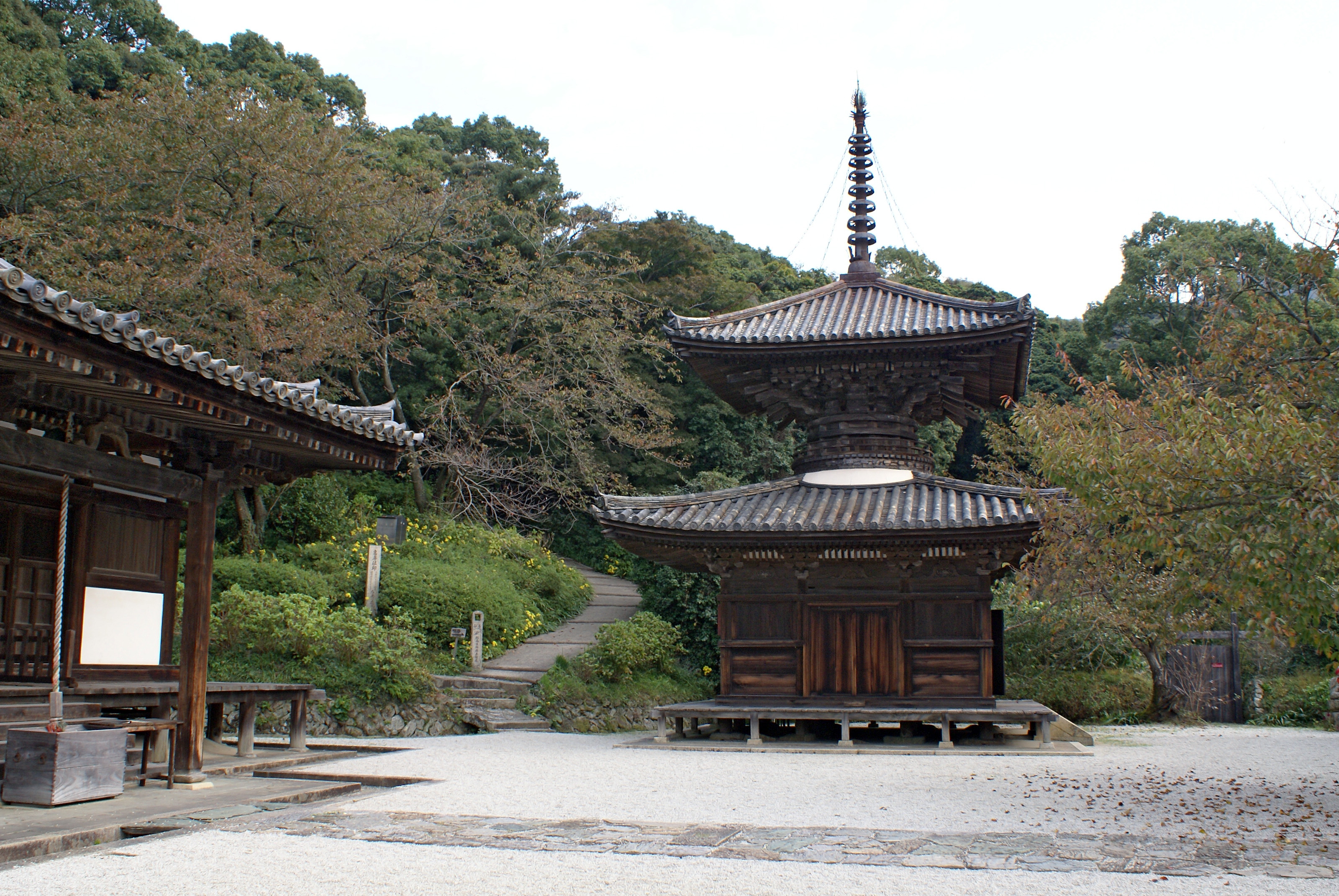
Pagoda

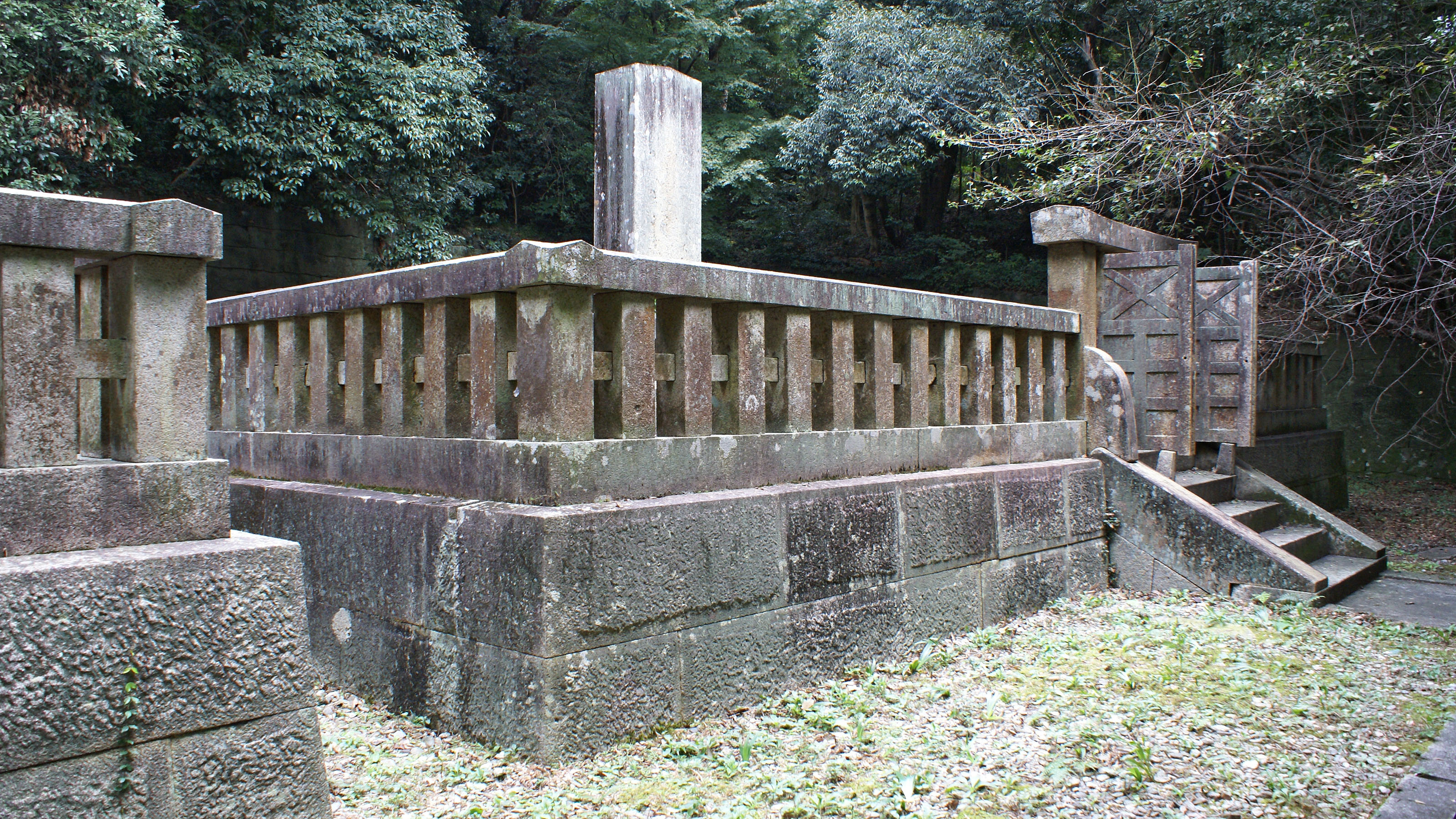
Tokugawa Mitsusada's grave

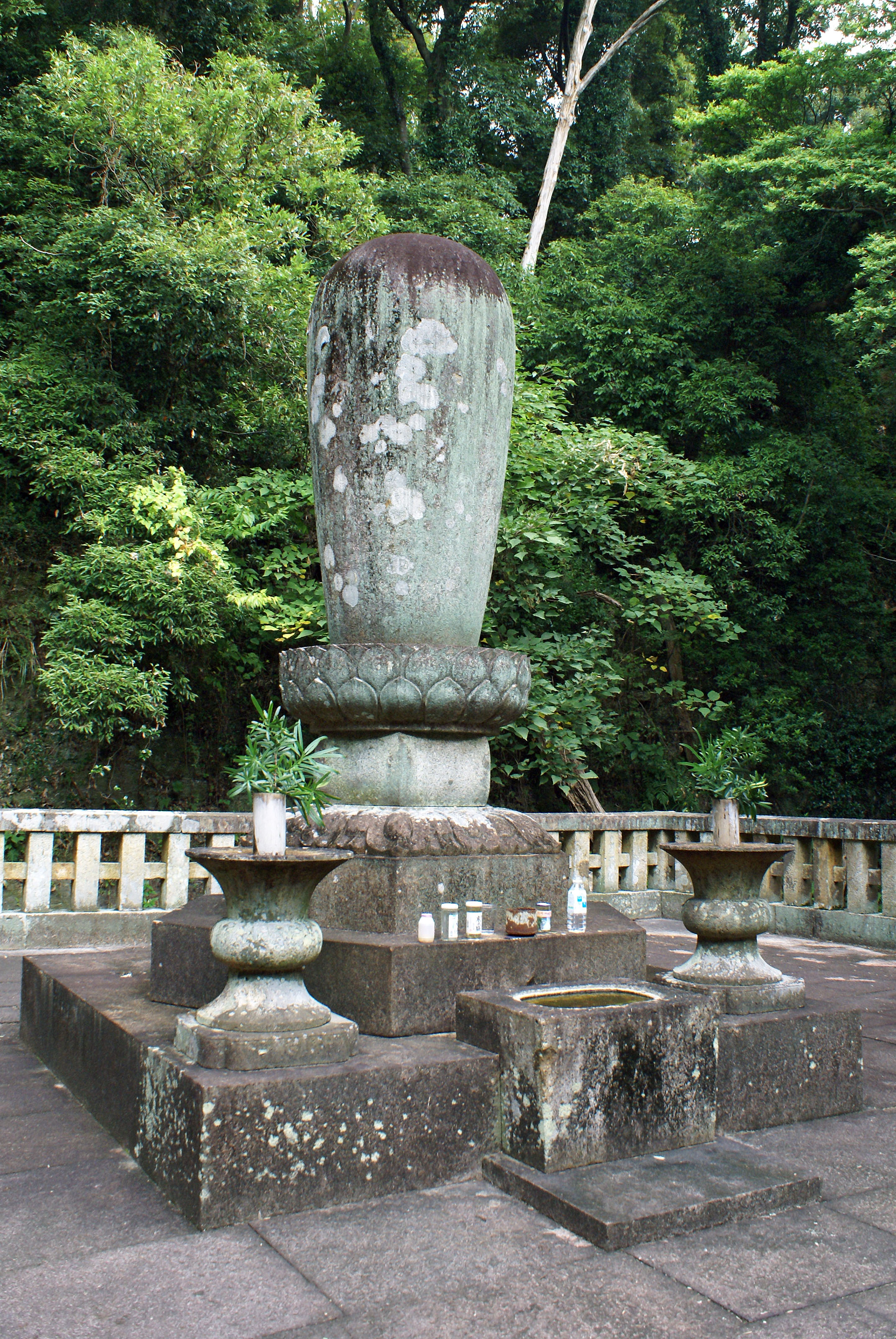
Tokugawa Yorinobu's grave

== See also ==
- List of National Treasures of Japan (temples)
- List of Historic Sites of Japan (Wakayama)
