= Tokugawa Munemasa =

Japanese daimyō

Tokugawa Munemasa (徳川 宗将; April 6, 1720 – April 14, 1765) was a Japanese daimyō of the mid-Edo period, who ruled the Wakayama Domain. He was the son of Tokugawa Munenao, grandson of Matsudaira Yorizumi and great-grandson of Kishū Domain founder, Tokugawa Yorinobu. His childhood name was Naomatsu (直松).

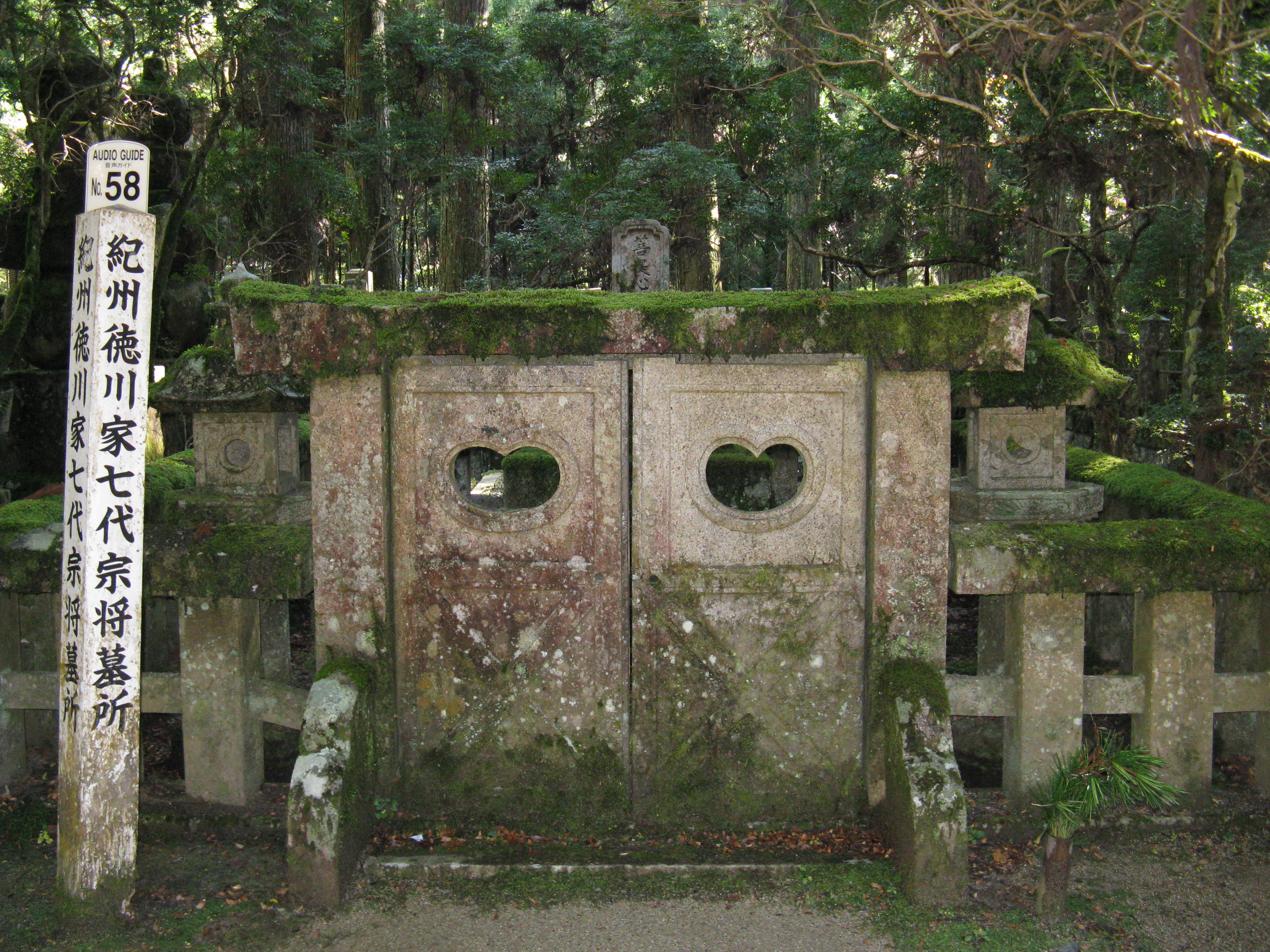
Grave of Tokugawa Munenobu

== Family ==
- Father: Tokugawa Munenao (1682–1757)
- Mother: Hattori-dono later Eiryu'in
- Wives:
  - Tokuko, daughter of Imadegawa Kinakira
  - Takako, daughter of Ichijō Kaneka
- Concubines:
  - Yoshida-dono
  - Maeda-dono
  - Murakami-dono
  - Ueda-dono
- Children:
  - Naomatsu by Tokuko
  - Senmanhime married Maeda Shigemichi by Tokuko
  - Kotohime betrothed to Ikeda Shigenobu by Tokuko
  - Mon'noshin by Tokuko
  - Matsudaira Yoriyuki by Tokuko
  - Ishihime by Tokuko
  - Matsudaira Tadakatsu of Kuwana Domain by Tokuko
  - Tokugawa Shigenori (1746–1829) by Yoshida
  - Ichihime married Matsudaira Shigetomi by Yoshida
  - Naito Satofumi (1751–1794) of Koromo Domain by Yoshida
  - Matsudaira Yorikata (1755–1806) of Saijo Domain by Maeda
  - Yorihime married Tokugawa Haruyuki by Murakami
  - Miura Tamenobu (1759–1789) by Murakami
  - Ando Michinori (1760–1825) by Murakami
  - Abe Masayoshi by Murakami
  - Matsudaira Tadatomo (1759–1802) of Kuwana Domain by Ueda

Preceded by Tokugawa Munenao	Lord of Kishū; 1757–1765	Succeeded by Tokugawa Shigenori
