= Kishū Tokugawa family =

Tokugawa clan branch

Tokugawa 徳川家 (紀州)
- Maruni-mitsubaaoi ("Circle Around Three Hollyhock Leaves"), the mon of the Kii branch of Tokugawa clan
- Home province: Kii
- Parent house: Tokugawa clan
- Titles: Daimyō
- Founder: Tokugawa Yorinobu
- Founding year: 1619
- Dissolution: still extant
- Cadet branches: Saijō-Matsudaira family

The Kishū Tokugawa family (紀州徳川家, Kishū Tokugawa-ke) is a branch of the Tokugawa clan based in Kii Province. The family was founded in 1619, when Tokugawa Yorinobu, 10th son of Tokugawa Ieyasu, was appointed to rule Kii Province. As Kii Province was alternatively called Kishū (紀州), so the family is also known as the Kii Tokugawa family (紀伊徳川家, Kii Tokugawa-ke).

== Family Tree ==
adoption
(1602-1671); Yorinobu^{(1)}
(1627-1705); Mitsusada^{(2)}	(1641-1711); Matsudaira Yorizumi
(1665-1705); Tsunanori^{(3)}
(1680-1705); Yorimoto^{(4)}
(1684-1751); Yoshimune^{(5)}	(1682-1757); Munenao^{(6)}
(1721–1765); Munetada	(1720-1765); Munenobu^{(7)}
(1751-1827); Harunari	(1746-1829); Shigenori^{(8)}	(1755-1806); Matsudaira Yorikata
(1773-1841); Ienari	(1779–1848); Narimasa	(1729-1789); Harusada^{(9)}
(1771-1853); Harutomi^{(10)}	(1785-1848); Matsudaira Yoriyuki
(1801-1846); Nariyuki^{(11)}
(1820-1849); Narikatsu^{(12)}	(1828–1876); Yoshiyori	(1809-1865); Matsudaira Yorisato
(1846-1866); Yoshitomi^{(13)}
(1844-1906); Mochitsugu^{(14)}
(1872-1925); Yorimichi^{(15)}	(1873-1963); Hisako
(1892-1954); Yorisada^{(16)}	Aoyama Yoshitarō
(1917-1958); Yoriaki^{(17)}	(b. 1926); Tomiko	(1924-?); Gō^{(18)}
(b. 1956); Kotoko^{(19)}
