= Kimii-dera =

Buddhist temple in Wakayama, Wakayama, Japan

Kimiidera
- 紀三井寺
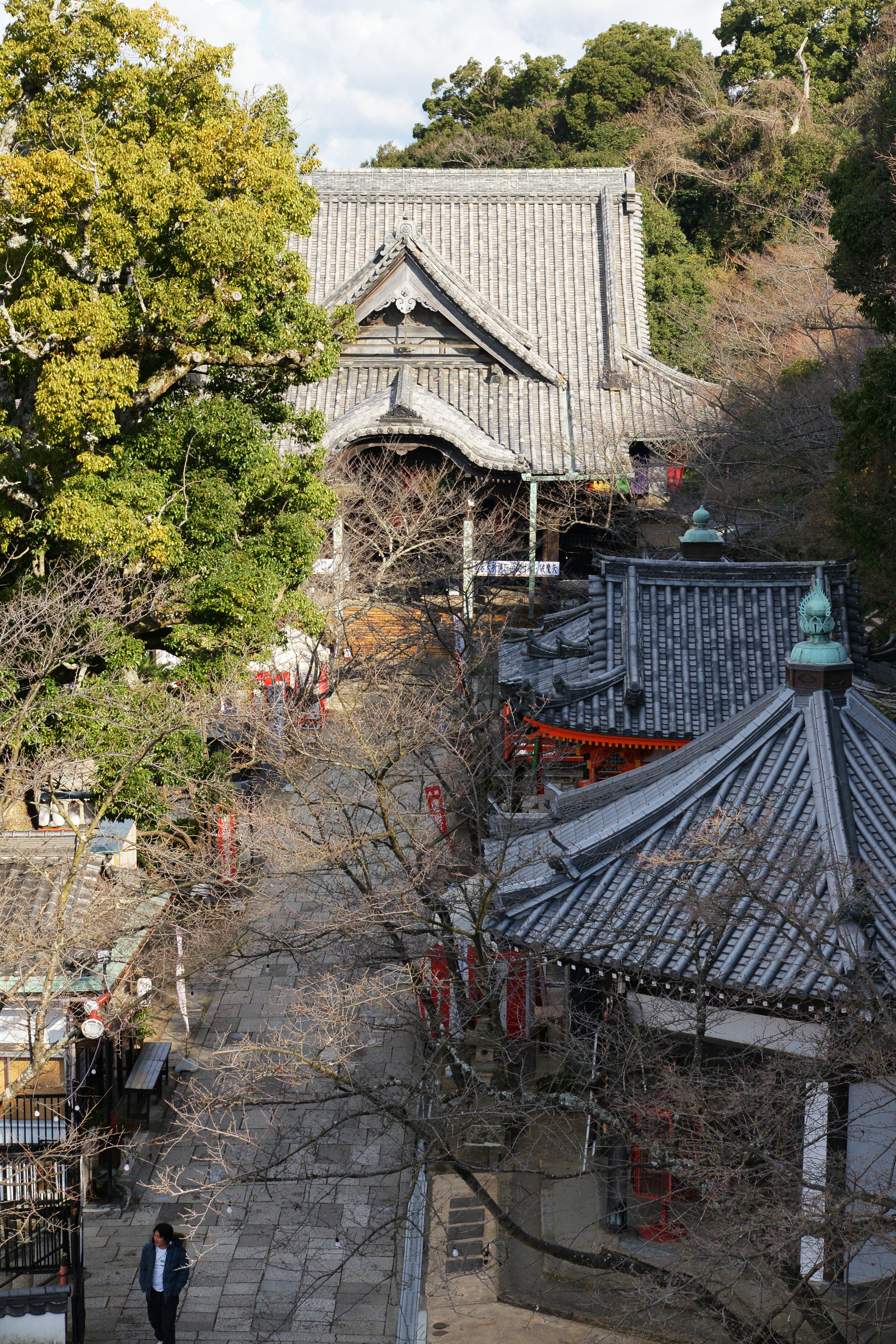
- Kimiidera precincts

- Location within Wakayama Prefecture Location within Japan

Religion
- Affiliation: Buddhist
- Deity: Jūichimen Kannon
- Rite: Kusei Kannon sect
- Status: functional

Location
- Location: 1201 Kimiidera, Wakayama-shi, Wakayama-ken
- Coordinates: 34°11′06.6″N 135°11′24.1″E

Architecture
- Founder: c.Tamemitsu
- Completed: c.770

Website
- Official website
- National Important Cultural Property

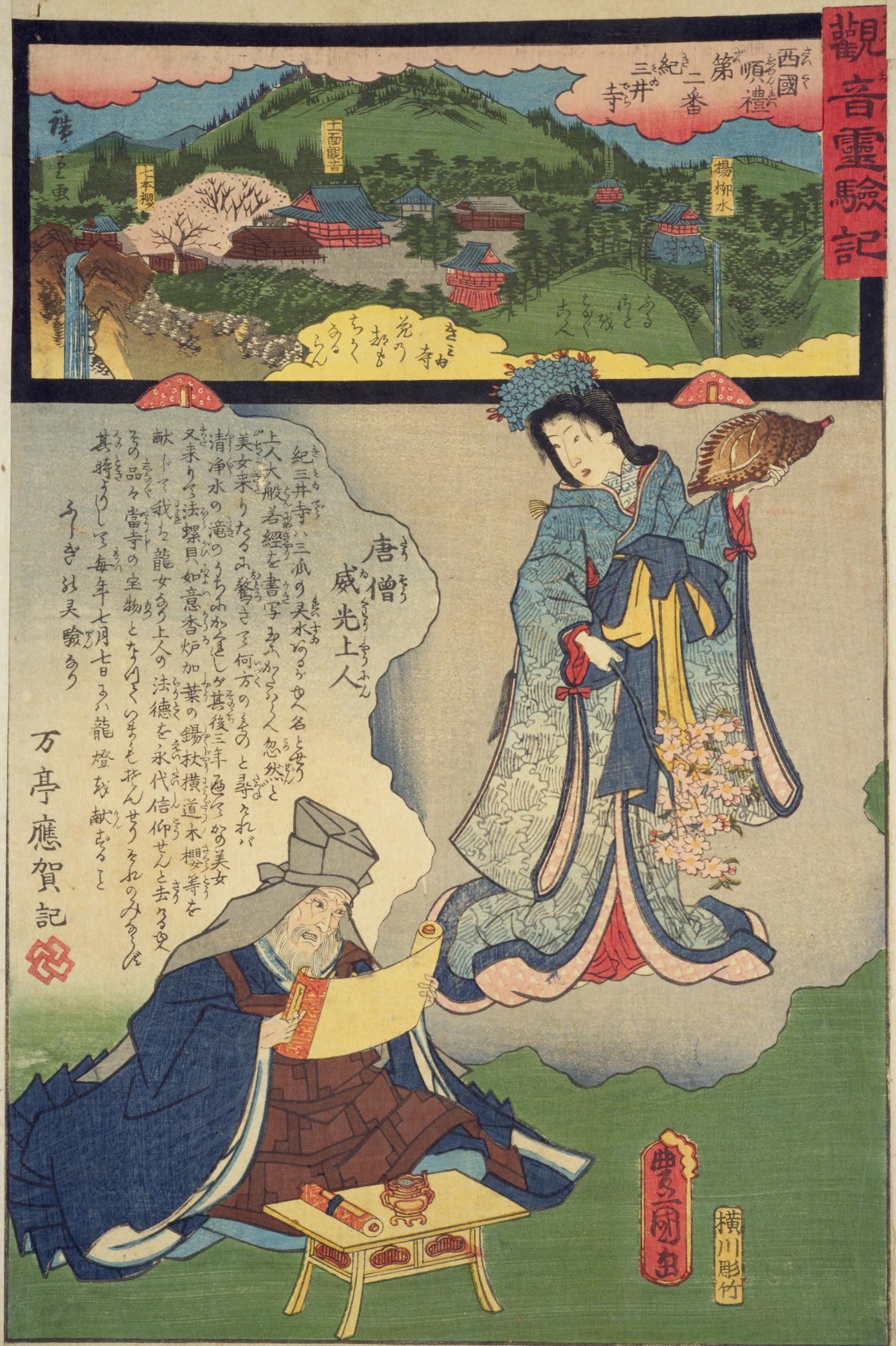
from the picture album "Kannon Reigen ki"

Kimii-dera (紀三井寺) is a Buddhist temple located in the city of Wakayama, Wakayama Prefecture, Japan. It is the head temple of the Kusei Kannon sect of Japanese Buddhism and its honzon is a hibutsu image of Jūichimen Kannon. The temple's full name is Kimiiyama Gokoku-in Kongōhō-ji (紀三井山 金剛寶寺 護國院).The temple is the 2nd stop on the Saigoku Kannon Pilgrimage route. The temple grounds are located on the western slope (approximately 50 meters above sea level) of Mount Nakusa (228.7 meters) in the southern part of the Kinokawa River estuary plain, offering a panoramic view of Wakaura Bay from the temple grounds. The temple is named after the three springs of water (Kisshō-sui, Seijō-sui, and Yōryū-sui) that spring up within the temple grounds. Each spring has a sandstone tank inscribed with the name of the water, along with the date of 1650. These tanks were built by order of Tokugawa Yorinobu, the daimyō of Wakayama Domain. In March 1985 the Ministry of the Environment selected the water as one of Japan's "100 Famous Waters." The temple grounds are also famous for cherry blossom viewing, and have been selected as one of Japan's 100 Best Cherry Blossom Viewing Spots. The sakura tree to the left of the main hall is designated as the specimen Somei-Yoshino cherry tree by the Wakayama Regional Meteorological Observatory for determining the start of spring. The temple originally belonged to the Yamashina branch of Shingon Buddhism, but in 1951 it became independent.

== History ==
According to legend, in 770, the a monk from Tang China was traveling around Japan when he saw a ray of light emanating from the summit of Mount Nagusa. Following the source of the light, he climbed the mountain and found a small golden statue of Senjū Kannon. He personally carved a Jūichimen Kannon statue and placed the small golden image inside, and constructed a hermitage. This marked the start of the temple. Although it is said that the mountain's name, "Kimii-san," comes from the three sacred springs on Mt. Nagusa, the Kii Zoku Fudoki states that it is a corruption of the nearby former place name, "Kemiura". The temple remained a small hermitage until it was designated a place of prayer for the imperial family by Emperor Go-Shirakawa at the end of the Heian period. By the Kamakura period, the number of resident monks exceeded 500, and it held vast shōen estates for its upkeep. Fragmentary descriptions found in various sources indicate that it had a deep connection with the ichinomiya of Kii Province, the Hinokuma Shrine. From the Muromachi period onward, the rise of the Saigoku Pilgrimage, and the Kumano Pilgrimage led to a large number of pilgrims. Kimii-dera was a single-mountain temple with many monks and sub-temples coexisting together, similar to the theocratic socialism of Ishiyama Hongan-ji. Married monks served as temple priests, and a kokuya (today's Kokuya-ji) was located next to the main hall, responsible for fundraising for construction and repairs. This Kokuya was a nunnery, and sold wooden block votive prints to pilgrims. Several documents related to fundraising have been preserved at Kokuya-ji. The fundraising letter from 1449 suggests that there had been some devastating blow in 1441 (probably a fire caused by a conflict between the remnants of the Southern Court and the Hatakeyama clan, the shugo of Kii Province), and although the various halls had been rebuilt, it was a fundraising letter for the restoration of the Tahōtō pagoda, which was still incomplete. The fundraising letter from 1522 asks for donations for the repair of the buildings, and it is clear that the reconstruction and restoration of the buildings had been carried out by the grain merchants. Furthermore, the "Memorandum on the Relocation of Kokuya Temple" dated 1698 reports that in 1585, during Toyotomi Hideyoshi's invasion of Kii Province, the abbess negotiated directly with Hideyoshi and thereby avoiding the burning of the temple. However, Hideyoshi did order the disarmament of the temple's sōhei armed monks, and confiscated most of the temple's lands. In 1601, Asano Yukinaga, lord of Wakayama Castle, donated 13 koku of land for the temple's upkeep. Subsequently, Tokugawa Yorinobu, the first daimyō of Wakayama Domain, donated 8 koku and waived taxes within the temple grounds. Successive daimyō of Wakayama Domain frequently visited the temple.

The current Main Hall was rebuilt in 1759. It has a gabled roof with original tile covering, five bays between pillars on both the front and side, chidori gables, and a three-bay veranda with a karahafu style roof at the front. The temple's details are in the Zen style, with rainbow-shaped beams, wooden noses attached to the head beams, architraves, and a three-armed joint. The Jūichimen Kannon statue, the principal image of the temple, and the Senjū Kannon, have now been moved to the Daikomyōden hall at the rear. The outer sanctuary is open to the public to accommodate the large number of pilgrims visitingm and Thirty-three Kannon statues, modeled after the principal images of the temples of the Thirty-three Kannon temples of the Saigoku Kannon Pilgrimage, are enshrined here. The earthquake-resistant and fire-resistant storage building (generally closed to the public) called the Daikomyōden is connected to the main hall and completed in 1983. The Jūichimen Kannon statue is on the left and the Senju Kannon on the right, and are displayed once over 50 years.

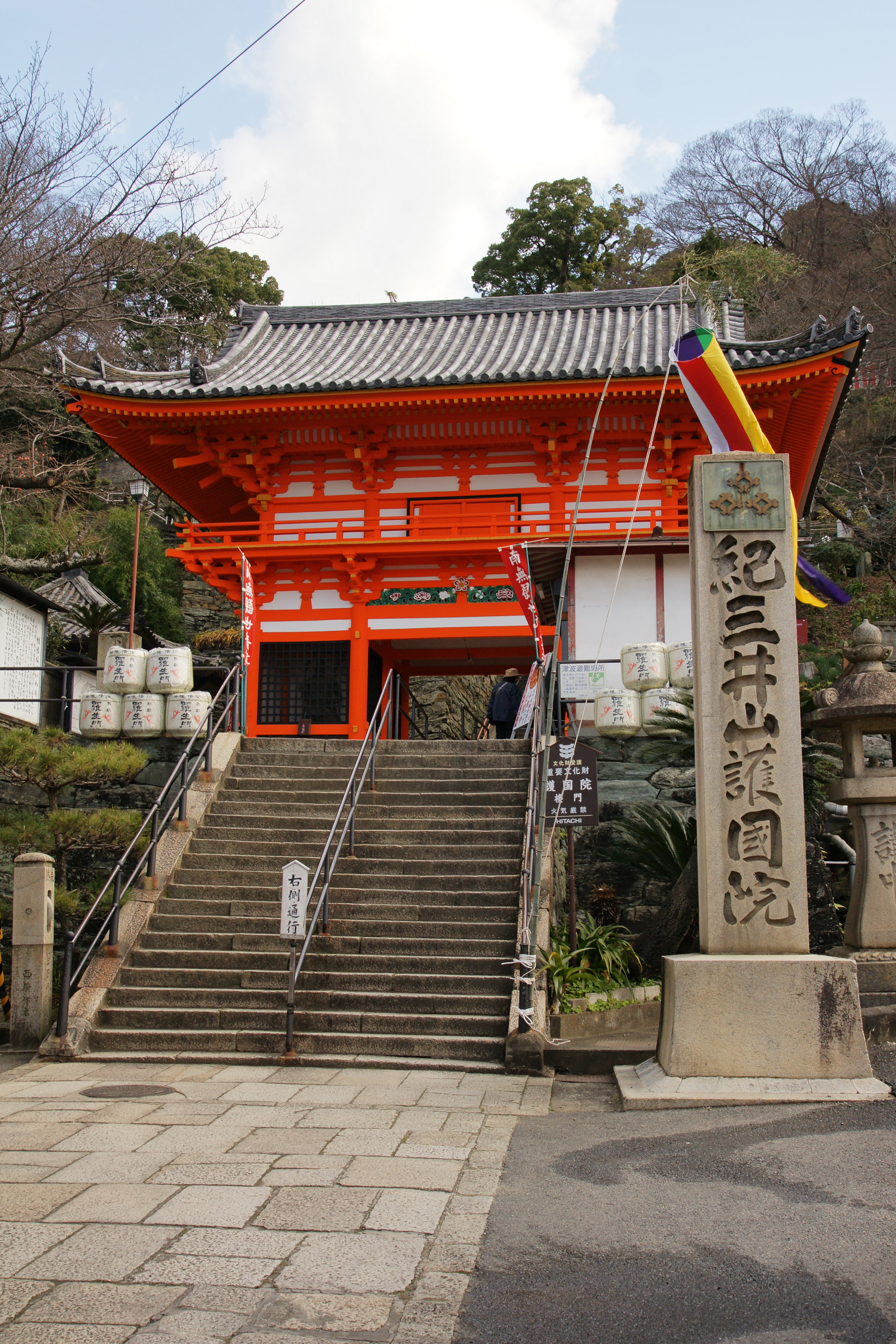
Rōmon

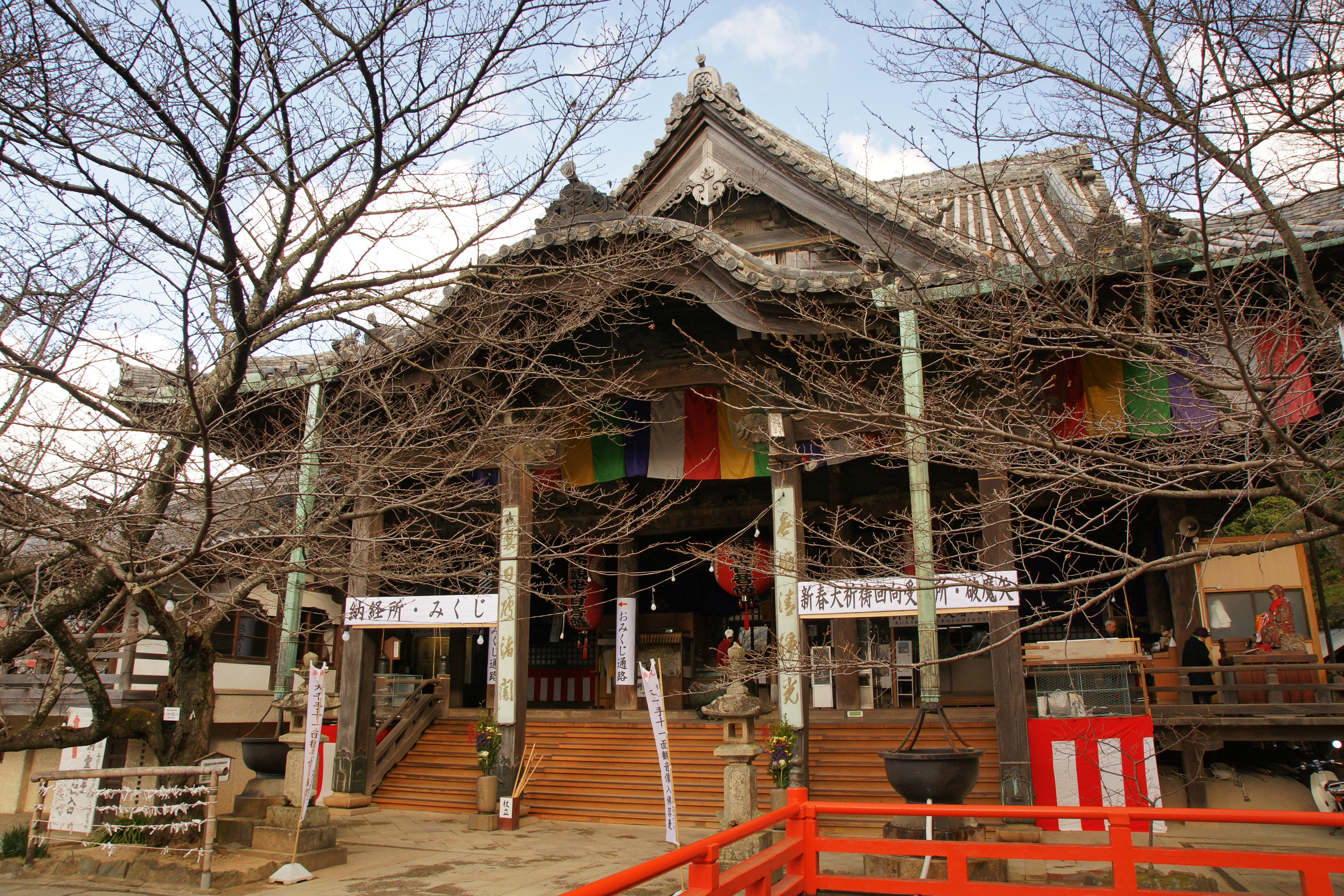
Hondō

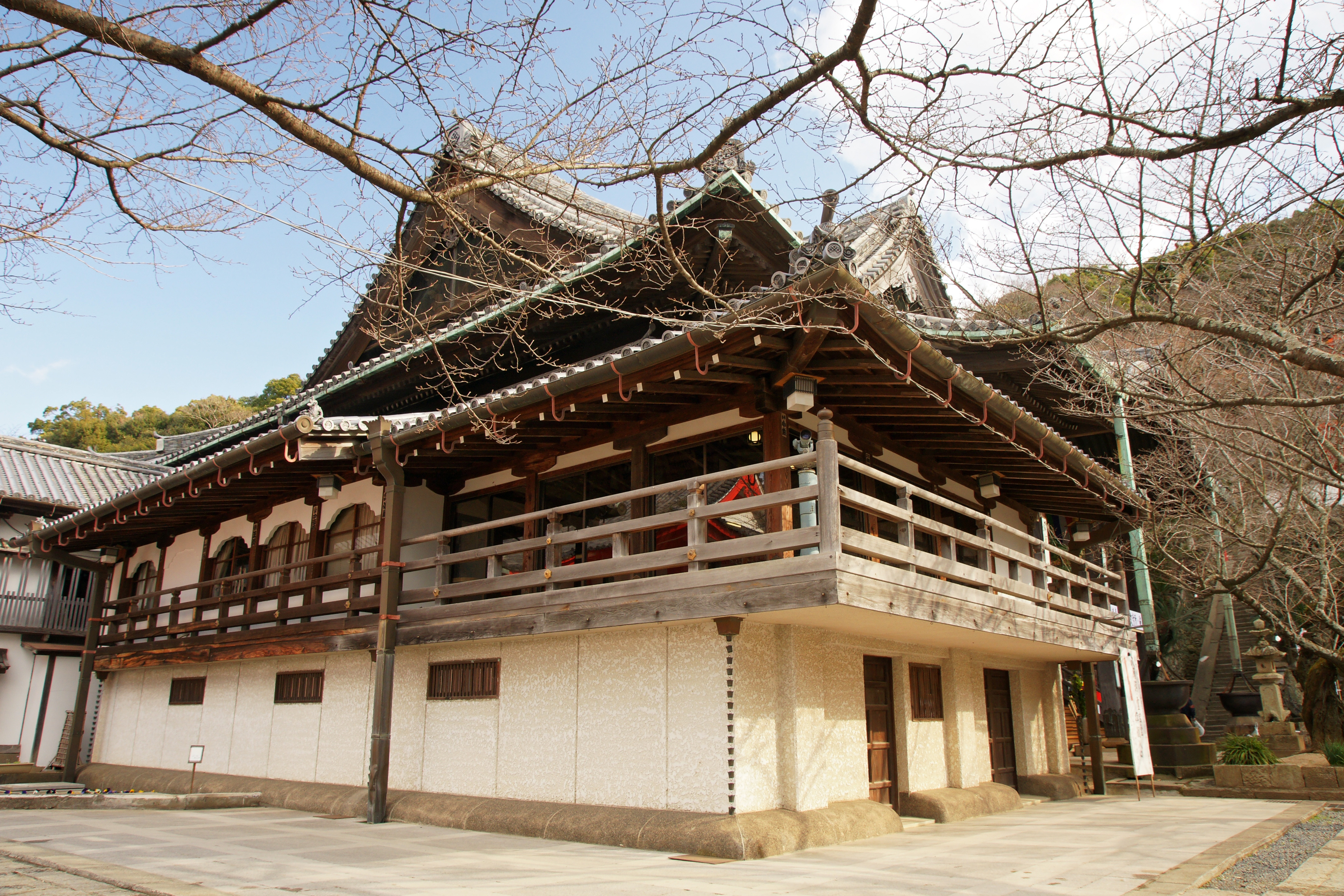
Emaden

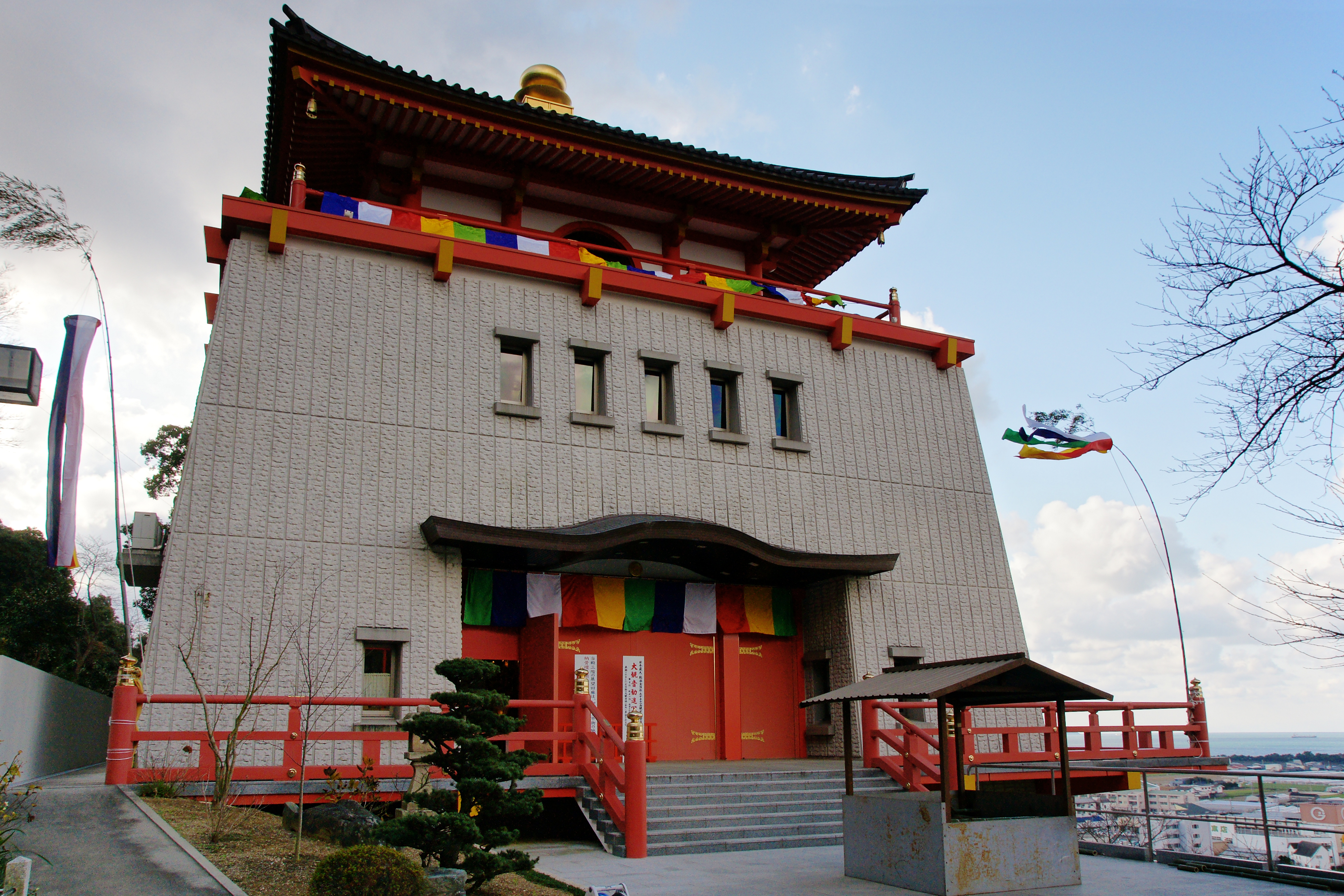
Butsuden

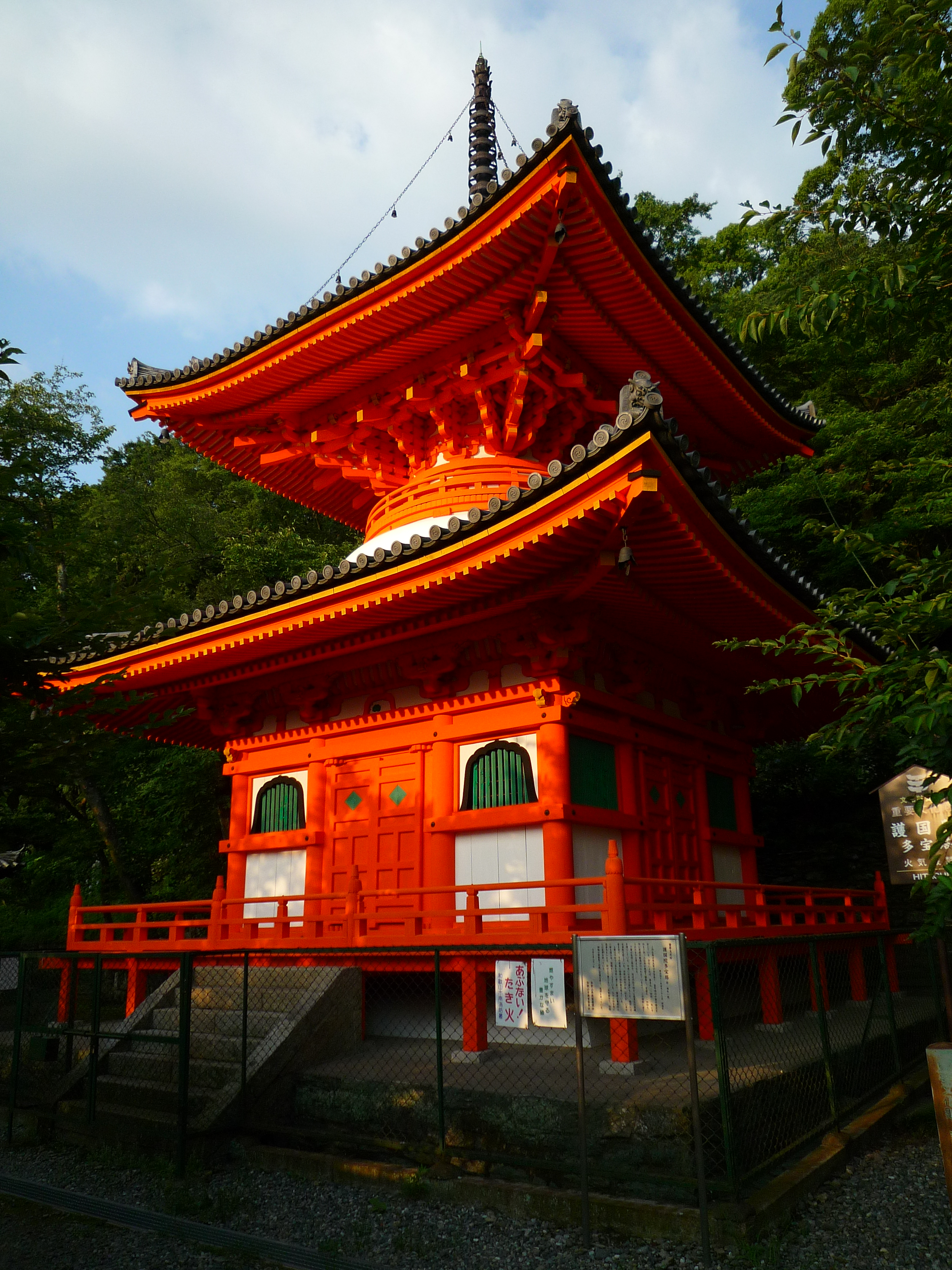
Tahōtō.jpg

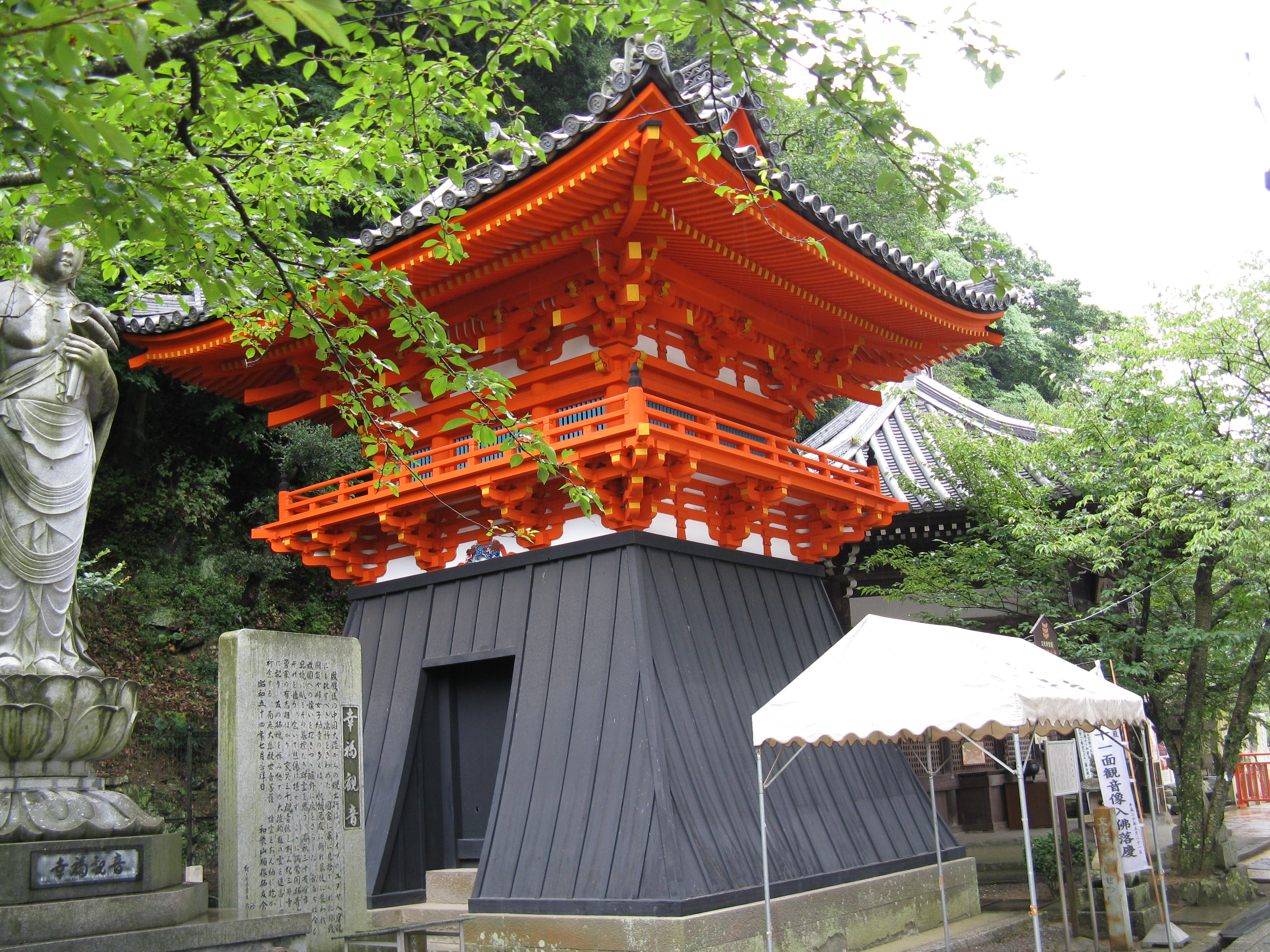
Shōrō

The Rōmon gate, marking the entrance to the temple grounds, is located about a 10-minute walk from JR West Kimiidera Station.

== Cultural Properties ==
=== National Important Cultural Properties ===
- Gokoku-in Rōmon (護国院楼門), mid-Muromachi period (1393-1466)
- Gokoku-in Shōrō (鐘楼), Azuchi-Momoyama period (1573-1614)
- Gokoku-in Tahōtō (護国院多宝塔), Muromachi period (1449)
- Wooden standing statue of Senju Kannon (木造千手観音立像 - 秘龕仏), Heian period;
- Wooden standing statue of Juichimen Kannon (木造千手観音立像 - 秘龕仏), Heian period; honzon
- Wooden standing statue of Juichimen Kannon (木造十一面観音立像), Heian period;
- Wooden standing statues of Bonten and Teishakuten Kannon (木造梵天・帝釈天立像), Heian period; (two statues)

=== Wakayama Prefecture Designated Tangible Cultural Properties ===
- Gokoku-in Hondō (護国院本堂), Edo period (1759)
- Gokoku-in Kaizan-dō (護国院開山堂), Edo period;
- Gokoku-in Rokaku-dō (護国院六角堂), Edo period;
- Gokoku-in Daishi-dō (護国院大師堂), Edo period;
- Gokoku-in Sansha Gongen (護国院三社権現), Edo period; (3 structures)
- Gokoku-in Shoin (護国院書院), Edo period;

=== Wakayama City Designated Tangible Cultural Properties ===
- Kimiidera Pilgrimage Mandala and Kumano Ten Worlds Happy Heart Mandala (紀三井寺参詣曼荼羅・熊野十界歓心曼荼羅), Heian period; (two scrolls)
- Colored silk painting of standing Jizo Bosatsu (絹本著色地蔵菩薩立像);
- Wooden statue of Shaka Nyorai (木彫釈迦如来像);
- Wooden standing statue of a Tenbu (木造天部立像), Heian period ;
- Standing statue of Senjū Kannon (千手観音立像), Heian period ;
- Seated statue of Miroku Bosatsu (弥勒菩薩坐像), Heian period ;
- Seated portrait statue of monk Tamemitsu (為光上人坐像), Heian period ;
- Buddhist Altar Items Possessed by Reverend Tamemitsu (伝為光上人所持仏具), Heian period ;
- Kimiidera Kanshinjo Letter (紀三井寺勧進状), Heian period ;
- Tahoto pagoda (多宝小塔), Heian period ;
