= Tokugawa Munetada =

Japanese samurai (1721–1765)

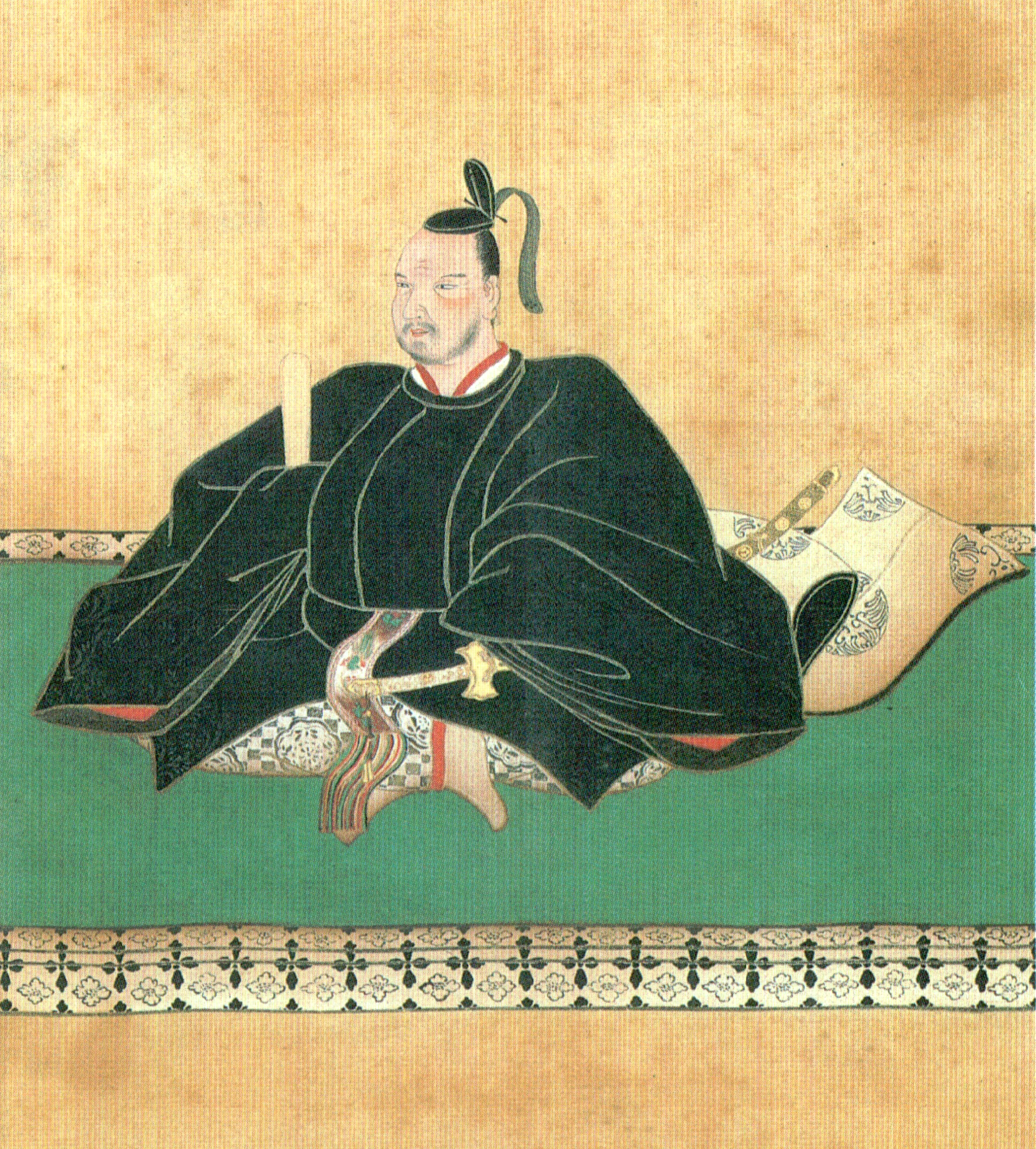
Tokugawa Munetada

Tokugawa Munetada (徳川 宗尹; September 7, 1721 – January 13, 1765) was a Japanese samurai of the mid-Edo period who was the founder of the Hitotsubashi-Tokugawa family, one of the Gosankyō, the three lesser branches of the Tokugawa family. He was the fourth son of Tokugawa Yoshimune, the eighth shōgun with his concubine, Oume no Kata. He is the grandfather of Tokugawa Ienari the eleventh shōgun, His child-hood name was "Kogorō" (小五郎) and when Oume died at 1721, he was raised by his grandmother Joenin until her death 1726 and later he was raised by Okume no Kata, Yoshimune's concubine.

== Family ==
- Father: Tokugawa Yoshimune
- Mother: Oume no Kata later Shinshin'in (1700–1721)
- Adopted Mother: Okume no Kata later Kakuju-in (1697-1777)
- Wife, Children, Concubines:
  - Wife: Ichijo Akiko later Fushin'in
    - Matsudaira Shigemasa
  - Concubine: ???
    - Sennosuke
    - Kanejirō
  - Concubine: Oyuka no Kata
    - Matsudaira Shigetomi
    - Yasuhime (1747-1769) married Shimazu Shigehide
    - Tokugawa Harusada (1751-1827)
    - Kuroda Haruyuki (1753-1781)
    - Kenzaburo

== Ancestry ==
Ancestors of Tokugawa Munetada

16. Tokugawa Ieyasu, 1st Tokugawa Shōgun (1543-1616)
8. Tokugawa Yorinobu, 1st daimyō of Kishū (1602-1671)
17. Yōjuin (1580-1653)
4. Tokugawa Mitsusada, 2nd daimyō of Kishū (1627-1705)
9. Nakagawa-dono
2. Tokugawa Yoshimune, 8th Tokugawa Shōgun (1684-1751)
5. Jōenin (1655-1726)
1. Tokugawa Munetada, 1st Hitotsubashi-Tokugawa family head
6. Taniguchi Masatsugu
3. Shinshin'in (1700-1721)

| Preceded by none | Hitotsubashi-Tokugawa family head 1746-1764 | Succeeded by Tokugawa Harusada |
