= Munenori =

- Gender: Male

Origin
- Origin: Japanese
- Meaning: Different meanings depending on the kanji used

Munenori (written: 宗矩, 宗則 or 宗紀) is a masculine Japanese given name. Notable people with the name include:

- Munenori Kawasaki (川﨑 宗則; born 1981), Japanese baseball player
- Matsudaira Munenori (松平 宗矩; 1715–1749), Japanese daimyō
- Munenori Nawa (名和 宗則), Japanese animation director
- Munenori Sawa (澤 宗紀; born 1979), Japanese professional wrestler
- Terashima Munenori (寺島 宗則; 1832–1893), Japanese diplomat
- Yagyū Munenori (柳生 宗矩; 1571–1646), Japanese swordsman
