= Shigemasa =

- Gender: Male

Origin
- Origin: Japanese
- Meaning: Different meanings depending on the kanji used

Shigemasa (written: 重政 or 重昌) is a masculine Japanese given name. Notable people with the name include:

- Shigemasa Higaki (born 1971), Japanese golfer
- Itakura Shigemasa (板倉 重昌; 1588–1638), Japanese daimyō
- Kitao Shigemasa (北尾 重政; 1739–1820), Japanese ukiyo-e artist
- Matsudaira Shigemasa (松平 重昌; 1743–1758), Japanese daimyō
- Matsukura Shigemasa (松倉 重政; 1574–1630), Japanese daimyō
- Nakagawa Shigemasa (中川 重政), Japanese samurai

== See also ==
- 6567 Shigemasa, main-belt asteroid
