= Matsudaira Shigetomi =

Japanese daimyō of the late Edo period

- 松平重富
- Born: December 25, 1748; Edo, Japan
- Died: July 30, 1808 (aged 59); Edo, Japan
- Title: Daimyō of Fukui Domain
- Predecessor: Matsudaira Haruyoshi
- Successor: Matsudaira Naritsugu
- Spouse(s): Ichihime, daughter of Tokugawa Munenobu
- Father: Tokugawa Munetada

Matsudaira Shigetomi (松平重富; 25 December 1748 – 30 July 1808) was the 12th daimyō of Fukui Domain under the Edo period Tokugawa shogunate in Echizen Province. He ruled Fukui for 41 years, the longest of any daimyō of Fukui Domain.

== Biography ==
Shigetomi was born in Edo as the third son of Tokugawa Munetada, founder of the Hitotsubashi-Tokugawa family, one of the Gosankyō, the three lesser branches of the Tokugawa clan. His childhood name was Senchiyō (仙千代) later become Sennosuke (仙之助).

On the death of his elder half-brother, Matsudaira Shigemasa of Fukui Domain in 1758, he was posthumously adopted as heir and became daimyō. In 1760 he underwent the genpuku ceremony and received a character from Shōgun Tokugawa Ieshige’s name to become Matsudaira Shigetomi.

During his tenure, he attempted to make fiscal reforms; however, damage caused by heavy snow, fires, windstorms, flood and epidemics in consecutive years thwarted his efforts, and the domain’s finances continued to deteriorate. Shigetomi was also accustomed to a luxurious lifestyle from his youth in the Hitotsubashi household. As revenues ran out, he imposed special taxes on the rice merchants to maintain these luxuries. This resulted in higher rice prices and great public dissatisfaction, cumulating in a massive riot in Fukui in 1768. Unable to suppress the rebellion, the domain officials were forced to agree to public demands, and to dispose of corrupt officials and merchants.

As a close relative of the shogunal house Shigetomi was uncle to Tokugawa Ienari, the domain was able to call on the central government for financial assistance. However, the Great Tenmei famine hit the domain hard. Shigetomi made rapeseed a domain monopoly in 1790, and salt in 1799. In 1799, he retired from public life in favor of his son. He also used his status to revive the honorary status of the domain, raising his court rank from Junior Fourth Rank, Upper Grade to Senior Fourth Rank, Lower Grade and his courtesy title from Sakon'e-gon-shōjō to Sakon'e-gon-chūjō.

He was married to a daughter of Tokugawa Munenobu of Kii Domain. His graves are at the clan temple of Kaian-ji in Shinagawa Tokyo and Unshō-ji in Fukui.

== Family ==
- Father: Tokugawa Munetada
- Mother: Oyuku no Kata
- Wife: Ichihime, daughter of Tokugawa Munenobu
- Concubines:
  - Fukuyama-dono
  - Okayama-dono
- Son: Matsudaira Haruyoshi by Ichihime

== Notes ==
Preceded by Matsudaira Shigemasa	12th Daimyō of Fukui; 1758–1799	Succeeded by Matsudaira Naritsugu
