= Ichijō Kaneteru =

Ichijō Kaneteru (一条 兼輝; May 20, 1652 – October 27, 1705), son of Norisuke, was a kugyō (court noble) of the Edo period (1603–1868) of Japan. He was also known as Ichijō Fuyutsune (一条 冬経). He held regents positions kampaku from 1682 to 1687 and from 1689 to 1690, and sesshō from 1687 to 1689. He married Norihime, daughter of Tokugawa Mitsusada, second head of Wakayama Domain, and the couple adopted Kaneka as their son.

== Family ==
- Father: Ichijo Norisuke
- Mother: Seigen’in (1636-1717)
- Wives:
  - Norihime, daughter of Tokugawa Mitsusada
  - daughter of Mori Nagatsugu
  - daughter of Yamashina Tokiyuki
- Adopted Son: Ichijo Kaneka
