= Matsudaira Yoshikuni =

Matsudaira Yoshikuni may refer to:

- Date Yoshikuni, lord of the Sendai Domain, who lived in the 19th century. (Lords of Sendai had the right to use the "Matsudaira" surname)
- Matsudaira Yoshikuni (Fukui), lord of the Fukui Domain, who lived in the late 17th century
