= Ichijō Norisuke =

Ichijō Norisuke (一条 教輔; June 8, 1633 – February 8, 1707), son of regent Ichijō Akiyoshi, was a kugyō (court noble) of the Edo period (1603–1868) of Japan. His wife was a daughter of Ikeda Mitsumasa, the founding father of Okayama Domain, and adopted daughter of shōgun Tokugawa Iemitsu, and with her he had son Kaneteru. Unlike his father or his son Kaneteru, he did not hold any regent position, but served as Udaijin.

== Family ==
- Father: Ichijo Akiyoshi
- Mother: Daughter of Nishinotoin Tokinao
- Wife: Seigen’in (1636–1717)
- Son: Ichijo Kaneteru
