= Matsudaira Munemasa =

- 松平 宗昌
- Born: August 14, 1675; Matsuoka, Fukui, Japan
- Died: May 19, 1724 (aged 48); Edo, Japan
- Spouse(s): Kikuhime, daughter of Ogasawara Tadataka of Kokura Domain
- Father: Matsudaira Masakatsu

2nd Daimyō of Echizen-Matsuoka Domain
- In office 1693–1721
- Preceded by: Matsudaira Masakatsu

9th Daimyō of Fukui Domain
- In office 1721–1724
- Preceded by: Matsudaira Yoshikuni
- Succeeded by: Matsudaira Munenori

Matsudaira Munemasa (松平 宗昌; August 14, 1675 – May 19, 1724) was a mid-Edo period Japanese samurai, and the final daimyō of Echizen-Matsuoka Domain and the 9th daimyō of Fukui Domain in Echizen Province of Japan He was a patron of the arts.

== Biography ==
Munemasa was born in Matsuoka in 1681 as the third son of Matsudaira Masakatsu of Echizen-Matsuoka Domain and his mother was a concubine. His name in infancy was Sentetsu (仙鉄), later becoming Matsudaira Masaoki (昌興) from 1693. The same year, he became daimyō of Echizen-Matsuoka on the death of his father. At that time, he took the name of Matsudaira Masahira (昌平) and was granted Senior Fifth Rank, Lower Grade Court rank and the courtesy title of Takumi-no-kami.

In 1721, he was chosen by Matsudaira Yoshikuni as heir to Fukui Domain, and became daimyō of Fukui the following year. With his accession to Fukui, Echizen-Matsuoka was dissolved and its territories rejoined to Fukui Domain. After being received in formal audience by Shōgun Tokugawa Yoshimune, he changed his name to Munemasa and was granted Senior Fourth Rank, Lower Grade court rank.

Munemasa was already in his 40s when he became daimyō, and although married to an adoptive daughter of Ogasawara Tadataka of Kokura Domain, he had no heir. This concerned the shogunate greatly, as Fukui Domain had been plagued several times by succession disputes, so at the insistence of the shogunate, he adopted Matsudaira Munenori of the Maebashi-Matsudaira clan as his heir, and married him to a daughter of Matsudaira Yoshikuni.

He died in 1724 at the clan residence in Edo. His grave was at the temple of Tentoku-ji in Toranomon, which was later moved the clan temple of Kaian-ji in Shinagawa, in Tokyo, as well as the temple of Unshō-ji in Fukui.

== Family ==
- Father: Matsudaira Masakatsu (1636–1693)
- Mother: Nakane-dono
- Wife: Kikuhime, daughter of Matsudaira Yorimoto of Nukada Domain (adopted by Ogasawara Tadataka of Kokura Domain)
- Concubine: Sugiyama-dono
- Daughter: Katsuhime, married Mōri Munehiro of Chōshū Domain

== Notes ==
Preceded by Matsudaira Masakatsu	2nd Daimyō of Echizen-Matsuoka; 1693–1721	Succeeded by: abolished -
Preceded by Matsudaira Yoshikuni	9th Daimyō of Fukui; 1721–1724	Succeeded by Matsudaira Munenori
