= Matsudaira Munenori =

- 松平 宗矩
- Born: April 29, 1715
- Died: November 30, 1749 (aged 34); Edo, Japan
- Title: Daimyō of Fukui Domain
- Term: 1724–1749
- Predecessor: Matsudaira Yoshikuni
- Successor: Matsudaira Naritsugu
- Spouse(s): Katsuhime, daughter of Matsudaira Yoshikuni
- Father: Matsudaira Chikakiyo

Matsudaira Munenori (松平 宗矩; April 29, 1715–November 30, 1749) was the 10th daimyō of Fukui Domain under the Edo period Tokugawa shogunate in Echizen Province.

== Biography ==
Munenori was the younger son of Matsudaira Chikakiyo, who was the fourth son of Matsudaira Naonori of Shirakawa Domain. Naonori was in turn the son of Matsudaira Naomoto of Himeji Domain, who was in turn the fifth son of Fukui domain's founder, Yūki Hideyasu. His childhood name was Senjirō (千次郎).

In 1712, he was selected by Shōgun Tokugawa Yoshimune to become heir to Fukui Domain, and was wed to a daughter of Matsudaira Yoshikuni. He became daimyō in 1724 on the death of Matsudaira Munemasa. He underwent the genpuku ceremony in 1726 and his name was changed to Hyobō-daisuke Munenori at that time, taking one kanji each from the names of Tokugawa Yoshimune and Matsudaira Munemasa. He also gained the court rank was Senior Fourth Rank, Lower Grade. In 1733, he gained the courtesy title of Sakon'e-gon-shōjō.

Under his tenure, extensive reforms were taken to root out corruption and to provide disaster relief for people suffering from crop failure or destitution. Munenori stressed fiscal restraint, and came down strongly on tax evasion by merchants. He also focused on forestry, especially the planting of lacquer trees, and improvements to the domain’s port at Mikuni. He also managed to have all the tenryō territories in Echizen Province placed under the administration of Fukui Domain, for which he received a percentage of their revenues. For these efforts, he is recognized as one of the best rulers of Fukui during the Edo period; however, his efforts were not enough to place the domain on sound financial footing, and a demand that he oversee the shogunal pilgrimage to the Nikkō Tōshō-gū in 1743 was also a severe financial setback.

He was a patron of the arts.

He died in Edo in 1749 at the age of 35, without natural heir. His graves are at the clan temple of Kaian-ji in Shinagawa Tokyo and Unshō-ji in Fukui.

== Family ==
- Father: Matsudaira Chikakiyo (1682–1721)
- Mother: Honda-dono
- Wife: Katsuhime, daughter of Matsudaira Yoshikuni

== Notes ==
Preceded by Matsudaira Yoshikuni	10th Daimyō of Fukui; 1724–1749	Succeeded by Matsudaira Shigemasa
