= Matsudaira Narisawa =

Actor

- 松平 斉善
- Born: October 31, 1820; Edo, Japan
- Died: September 15, 1838 (aged 17); Edo, Japan
- Title: Daimyō of Fukui Domain
- Predecessor: Matsudaira Naritsugu
- Successor: Matsudaira Yoshinaga
- Spouse: -none-
- Father: Tokugawa Ienari

Matsudaira Narisawa (松平 斉善; 31 October 1820 – 15 September 1838) was the 15th daimyō of Fukui Domain under the Edo period Tokugawa shogunate in Echizen Province.

Narisawa was born in Edo as the 22nd son of Shōgun Tokugawa Ienari. His mother was a concubine, Ohachi no Kata (later known as Honrin'in; d. 1850). His childhood name was Taminosuke (民之助) or Sensaburō (千三郎) In 1835, when Matsudaira Naritsugu (husband of Narisawa's sister, Asahime) died without an heir, Narisawa was chosen by the shogunate to become daimyō of Fukui Domain. At that time, his court rank was raised from Junior Fourth Rank, Upper Grade to Senior Fourth Rank, Lower Grade and he was granted the courtesy title of Echizen-no-kami. This was raised to Sakon'e-no-chūjō in 1837.

He had poor health since childhood. He departed Edo for his domain in June 1838, but died shortly after reaching Fukui in September of the same year. Under most circumstances, this would have been cause for attainder of the domain; however, through the quick intervention of Asahime, a cousin (Matsudaira Shungaku) was chosen as his posthumous successor, and the official date of Narisawa's death was changed to show that a successor had been appointed before he died.

During the short period that he was daimyō, Narisawa had no impact on domain affairs. The domain made an official petition to have its kokudaka raised in 1835 due to financial difficulties and its 900,000 ryō debt, but this petition was refused. In 1837, the domain's Edo residence burned down, and was 20,000 ryō loan was obtained from the shogunate for its reconstruction. The same year, a crop failure in Fukui resulted in another 10,000 ryō loan, and a further 20,000 ryō was extended the following year for Asahime's retirement residence.

== Notes ==
Preceded by Matsudaira Naritsugu	15thDaimyō of Fukui; 1835–1838	Succeeded by Matsudaira Yoshinaga
