= Matsudaira Haruyoshi =

Japanese daimyō (1768–1826)

- 松平 治好
- Born: May 11, 1768; Edo, Japan
- Died: January 8, 1826 (aged 57); Edo, Japan
- Title: Daimyō of Fukui Domain
- Predecessor: Matsudaira Shigetomi
- Successor: Matsudaira Naritsugu
- Spouse(s): Sadahime, daughter of Tokugawa Munetake
- Father: Matsudaira Shigetomi

Matsudaira Haruyoshi (松平 治好; 11 May 1768 – 8 January 1826) was the 13th daimyō of Fukui Domain under the Edo period Tokugawa shogunate in Echizen Province.

Haruyoshi was born in Edo as the eldest son of Matsudaira Shigetomi. His childhood name was Ogimaru (於義丸). He underwent his genpuku ceremony in 1783 and received a kanji from Shōgun Tokugawa Ieharu's name to become Matsudaira Haruyoshi. At that time, his court rank was junior fourth rank, upper grade. He became daimyō in 1799 on the retirement of his father, and gained the courtesy title of sakon'e-gon-shōjō. This courtesy title became echizen-no-kami in 1802, and sakon'e-no-chūjō in 1811. In 1823, his court rank became senior fourth rank, lower grade.

His wife was a daughter of Tokugawa Munetake, of the Tayasu-Tokugawa family, one of the Gosankyō, the three lesser branches of the Tokugawa clan.

His tenure was largely uneventful, and he is remembered for the creation of a han school in 1807 in Fukui specializing in medicine. However, the financial situation of the domain remained dire, and conditions were not helped by his luxurious lifestyle and the need to rebuild the domain’s Edo residence after a fire. In 1822, the domain declared that indigo would become a domain monopoly.

In 1817, he arranged for the marriage of his eldest son and heir, Matsudaira Naritsugu to a daughter of Shōgun Tokugawa Ienari. In 1818, the kokudaka of Fukui Domain was increased by 20,000 koku, bringing its total to 320,000 koku. He died in Edo in 1826. His graves are at the clan temple of Kaian-ji in Shinagawa Tokyo, and Unshō-ji in Fukui.

== Family ==
- Father: Matsudaira Shigetomi
- Mother: Ichihime, daughter of Tokugawa Munenobu
- Wife: Sadahime (1767–1813), daughter of Tokugawa Munetake
- Concubines:
  - Yamashita-dono
  - Chigusa-dono
- Children:
  - Sohime, married Matsudaira Naritaka of Tsuyama Domain
  - Ogimaru
  - 3 daughters died in womb
  - Matsudaira Naritsugu by Chigusa
  - Zendo
  - Norihime, married Abe Masahiro of Fukuyama Domain

== Notes ==
| Preceded by Matsudaira Shigetomi | 13th Daimyō of Fukui; 1799–1826 | Succeeded by Matsudaira Naritsugu |
