= Matsudaira Yoshikuni (Fukui) =

- 松平 吉邦
- Born: March 2, 1681; Edo, Japan
- Died: January 20, 1722 (aged 40); Edo, Japan
- Title: Daimyō of Fukui Domain
- Predecessor: Matsudaira Yoshinori
- Successor: Matsudaira Munemasa
- Spouse: daughter of Hino Yoshikuni
- Father: Matsudaira Masakatsu

Matsudaira Yoshikuni (松平 吉邦; 2 March 1681 – 20 January 1722) was a mid-Edo period Japanese samurai, and the 8th daimyō of Fukui Domain He was famed as a lover of sumo.

== Biography ==
Yoshikuni was born in Edo in 1681 as the sixth son of Matsudaira Masakatsu of Echizen-Matsuoka Domain and his mother was a concubine. His name in infancy was Katsuchiyo (勝千代), later becoming Matsudaira Masanao (昌尚). In 1701, when his uncle Matsudaira Masachika selected him has heir to Fukui Domain, he took the name of Matsudaira Masakuni (昌邦), and after his adoptive father Masachika was granted a formal audience by Shōgun Tokugawa Ietsuna and had his name changed to Yoshinori, he followed suit, becoming Matsudaira Yoshikuni. At that time, he was granted Senior Fifth Rank, Lower Grade Court rank and the courtesy title of Ōi-no-kami

He became daimyō in 1710 on his father's retirement. In 1714, he was granted the courtesy title of Sakon'e-gon-shōjō.

In his tenure, he attempted to rebuild the domain's finances, and stressed public works projects in emulation of Tokugawa Yoshimune, whom he greatly admired. He dismissed a number of incompetent officials and corrupt magistrates, including the domain's Kanjō-bugyō, and proved to be a popular ruler. In return, Tokugawa Yoshimune ordered that all of the tenryō territory in Echizen be administered by Fukui Domain. This effectively added 100,000 koku to the domain's kokudaka. He also completed a comprehensive historical survey of Echizen Province, listing 330 ruins of castles and fortified manors.

In 1714, he invited military strategist Daidōji Yūzan to Fukui Domain. He died in 1722, without male heir and was succeeded by his brother Matsudaira Munemasa. His graves are at the temple of Unshō-ji in Fukui, and the clan temple of Kaian-ji in Shinagawa, Tokyo.

== Family ==
- Father: Matsudaira Masakatsu (1636–1693)
- Mother: Akiyama-dono
- Adoptive father: Matsudaira Yoshinori
- Wife: daughter of kuge Hino Yoshikuni
- Concubine: Itsuji-dono
- Daughter: Katsuhime, married Matsudaira Munenori

== Notes ==
| Preceded by Matsudaira Yoshinori | 8th Daimyō of Fukui; 1710–1721 | Succeeded by Matsudaira Munemasa |
