= Matsudaira Shigemasa =

- 松平 重昌
- Born: October 9, 1743; Edo, Japan
- Died: April 25, 1758 (aged 14); Edo, Japan
- Title: Daimyō of Fukui Domain
- Predecessor: Matsudaira Munenori
- Successor: Matsudaira Shigetomi
- Spouse: -none-
- Father: Tokugawa Munetada

Matsudaira Shigemasa (松平 重昌; 9 October 1743 – 25 April 1758) was the 11th daimyō of Fukui Domain under the Edo period Tokugawa shogunate. in Echizen Province.

Shigemasa was born in Edo Castle as the eldest son of Tokugawa Munetada, founder of the Hitotsubashi-Tokugawa family, one of the Gosankyō, the three lesser branches of the Tokugawa clan. His mother was a daughter of the kampaku Ichijō Kaneka. His childhood name was Ogimaru (於義丸) given by his grandfather, Shōgun Tokugawa Yoshimune. In 1747, on the order of his uncle, Shōgun Tokugawa Ieshige, he became the adopted son and heir of Matsudaira Munenori of Fukui Domain. He became daimyō two years later on Muninori's death. At the time, he was called by his youth name of Matsudaira Kogorō; however, in 1751 he underwent the genpuku ceremony and received a character from Tokugawa Ieshige's name to become Matsudaira Shigemasa. In 1755, his court rank was Junior Fourth Rank, Upper Grade and his courtesy title was Sakon'e-gon-shōjō and Echizen-no-kami.

Due to his youth, he played little role in domain affairs, which were handled by his senior retainers. The tenryō territories previously administered by the domain reverted to direct shogunal control, resulting in a severe loss of revenue. This problem was made worse by poor harvests and flooding in certain areas of the domain.

Although betrothed to the sixth daughter of Tokugawa Munekatsu of Owari Domain, Shigemasa died in 1758 before his marriage and without heir. His graves are at the clan temple of Kaian-ji in Shinagawa Tokyo and Unshō-ji in Fukui.

== Notes ==
Preceded by Matsudaira Munenori	11th Daimyō of Fukui; 1749–1758	Succeeded by Matsudaira Shigetomi
