= Matsudaira Naritsugu =

14th daimyō of Fukui Domain (1811–1835)

- 松平 斉承
- Born: March 5, 1811; Edo, Japan
- Died: July 27, 1835 (aged 24); Fukui, Fukui, Japan
- Title: Daimyō of Fukui Domain
- Predecessor: Matsudaira Haruyoshi
- Successor: Matsudaira Narisawa
- Spouse(s): Asahime, daughter of Tokugawa Ienari
- Father: Matsudaira Haruyoshi

Matsudaira Naritsugu (松平 斉承; 5 March 1811 – 27 July 1835) was the 14th daimyō of Fukui Domain under the Edo period Tokugawa shogunate in Echizen Province.

== Biography ==
Naritsugu was born in Fukui as the third son of Matsudaira Haruyoshi. Naritsugu's mother was of lowly origins, she was taken care of by the later ruler Matsudaira Shungaku who described her as a 'teahouse girl'. His childhood name was Jinosuke (仁之助). In 1817, he was engaged to Asahime, a daughter of Shōgun Tokugawa Ienari, and the couple was formally married in 1819.

He underwent his genpuku ceremony in 1824 and received a kanji from Tokugawa Ienari’s name to become Matsudaira Naritsugu. At that time, his courtesy title was Iyo-no-kami and his court rank was Junior Fourth Rank, Upper Grade.

His father died in 1825 and he formally became daimyō of Fukui early the following year. His courtesy title became Echizen-no-kami and also Sakon'e-no-shōjō

Early in his tenure (from 1827) he ordered a five-year fiscal austerity plan in an attempt to rebuild the domain’s finances, and from 1829 he ordered that the domain’s retainers be reduced to half the present number over the next seven years. However, in stark contrast to these efforts, he maintained the luxurious lifestyle of his father and grandfather, and spared no expense when he rebuilt the palace within the grounds of Fukui Castle. The domain was also hit hard by increasing rice prices, and a major smallpox epidemic.

Naritsugu also attempted to convince the Shōgun to allow him to trade territories with Hikone Domain under the control of the Ii clan; however, he died in 1835 at the domain’s Edo residence at the age of 25, possibly due to illness, before a decision was reached. This was one of the causes of the ill-will between the Tairō Ii Naosuke and future daimyō of Fukui, especially Matsudaira Shungaku.

At the time of his death, Naritsugu had not yet produced an heir. A younger son of Tokugawa Ienari, and thus a brother of Asahime, was chosen as successor.

== Portrayal in media ==
- Naritsugu serves as the primary antagonist in the 1963 film 13 Assassins directed by Eiichi Kudo, where he is played by Kantarō Suga. The film is set in 1844 and portrays Naritsugu as the sadistic half-brother of the Shōgun and that his death was an assassination carried out on the order of Doi Toshitsura, both of these elements would remain true in the remake.
  - In Takashi Miike's 2010 remake, Naritsugu again plays the villain, portrayed by Gorō Inagaki.
- In Eleven Samurai, a 1967 semi-remake of 13 Assassins also by Kudo, the final installment of his unofficial Samurai Revolution trilogy, the Matsudaira character is again depicted as an amoral, murderous lord but given the first name Nariatsu and again portrayed by Kantarō Suga.

== Notes ==
Preceded by Matsudaira Haruyoshi	14th Daimyō of Fukui; 1826–1835	Succeeded by Matsudaira Narisawa
