= Tokugawa Mitsusada =

Japanese daimyō (1627–1705)

Tokugawa Mitsusada (徳川 光貞; January 28, 1627 – September 25, 1705) was a daimyō in Japan during the Edo period (1603–1868). Mitsusada was born as the son and heir of Tokugawa Yorinobu and a grandson of Tokugawa Ieyasu with the childhood name Nagatomimaru (長福丸). Among his sons was the eighth Tokugawa shōgun Yoshimune. Norihime, a daughter of his, married Ichijō Kaneteru. He married the daughter of Prince Fushimi-no-Miya Sadakiyo, Yaso-no-Miya Teruko (who is also the sister of Asa no Miya Akiko who was 4th shōgun, Tokugawa Ietsuna's wife).

One of the gosanke, Mitsusada ruled the Wakayama Domain from its castle, his birthplace, in Wakayama. He reached the Junior Second court rank while alive, and was awarded the Junior First rank posthumously; he also held the ceremonial post of gon-dainagon. His grave is at Chōhō-ji in Wakayama. His other sons were Tokugawa Tsunanori (1665–1705) and Tokugawa Yoritomo (1680–1705).

== Family ==
- Father: Tokugawa Yorinobu
- Mother: Nakagawa-dono (1601–1666)
- Wife: Yaso-no-Miya Teruko later Tenshin'in
- Concubines
  - Yamada-dono later Zuiyoin
  - Miyazaki-dono
  - Chigusa-dono
  - Oyuri no Kata (1655–1726)
- Children:
  - Tokugawa Tsunanori (1665–1705) by Yamada, 4th Lord of Kishu and married Tsuruhime, daughter of 5th shōgun Tokugawa Tsunayoshi
  - Jirokichi
  - Tokugawa Yorimoto (1680–1705) by Miyazaki, 5th Lord of Kishu
  - Tokugawa Yoshimune by Oyuri
  - Sakae-Hime married Uesugi Tsunanori of Yonezawa Domain
  - Norihime married Ichijo Kaneteru
  - Tsunahime by Chigusa
  - Ikuhime married Satake Yoshimitsu

== Ancestry ==
Ancestors of Tokugawa Mitsusada

16. Matsudaira Kiyoyasu (1511-1535)
8.Matsudaira Hirotada (1526-1549)
17. Aoki
4. Tokugawa Ieyasu, 1st Tokugawa Shōgun (1543-1616)
18. Mizuno Tadamasa (1493-1543)
9. O-dainokata (1528-1602)
19. Keyōin (1492-1560)
2. Tokugawa Yorinobu, 1st daimyō of Kishū (1602-1671)
20. Masaki Tokitada (1521-1576)
10. Masaki Yoritada (1551-1622)
21. Kasutani
5. Yōjuin (1580-1653)
11. Hōjō
1. Tokugawa Mitsusada, 2nd daimyō of Kishū
3. Nakagawa-dono

== See also ==
- Chōhō-ji
