= Kishū Domain =

Edo period Japanese feudal domain in Kii province

Wakayama Domain (1869–1871) 和歌山藩 Kishū Domain (1600–1869) 紀州藩
- Domain of Japan
- 1600–1871
- Flag Mon of the Kishu-Tokugawa clan

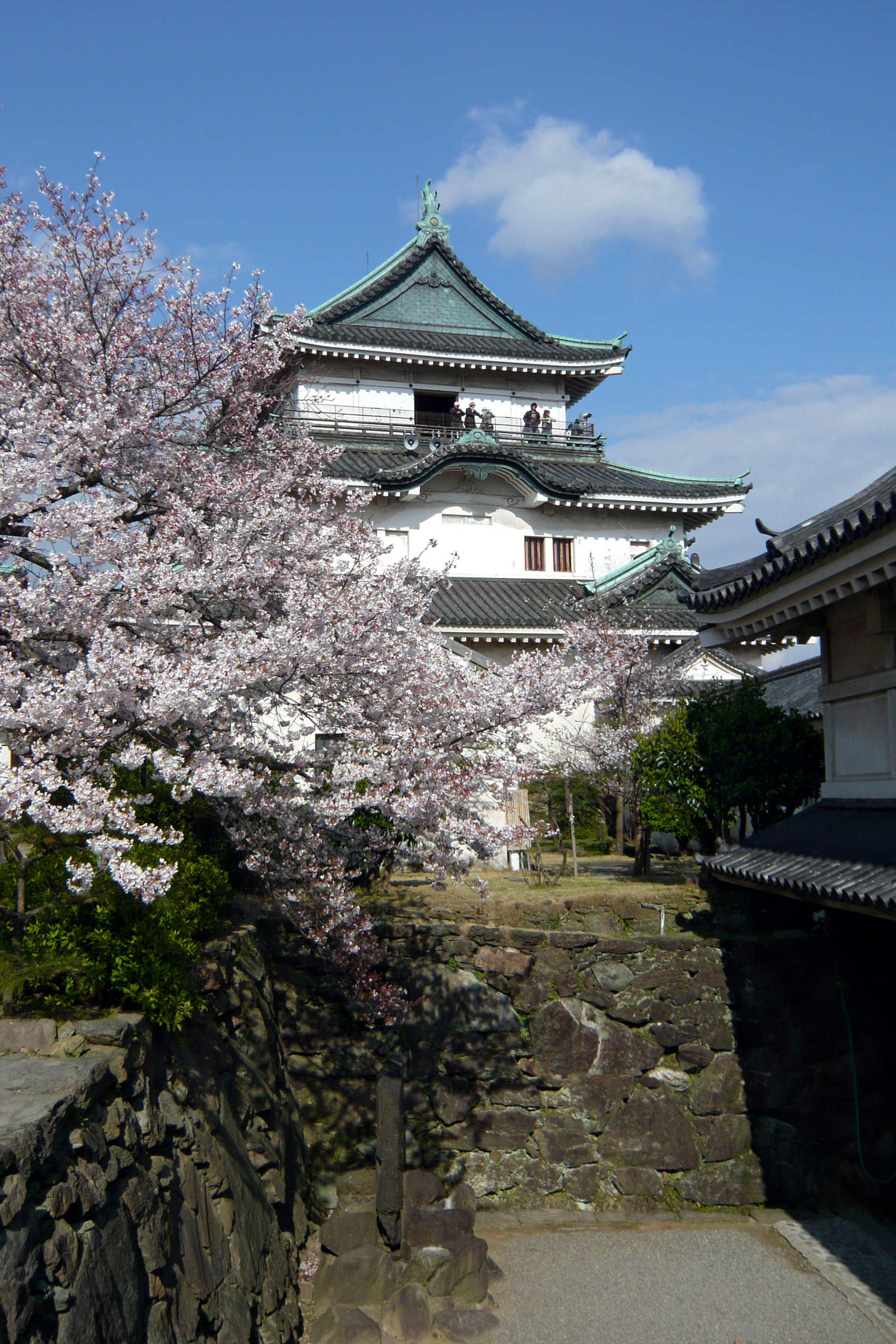
- Wakayama Castle, Wakayama, Wakayama prefecture, Japan.
- Capital: Wakayama Castle
- Government
  - Type: Daimyō
- Daimyō
  - 1600–1613: Asano Yoshinaga (first)
  - 1858–1871: Tokugawa Mochitsugu (last)
- Historical era: Edo period
  - Established: 1600
  - Disestablished: 1871
- Today part of: Wakayama Prefecture

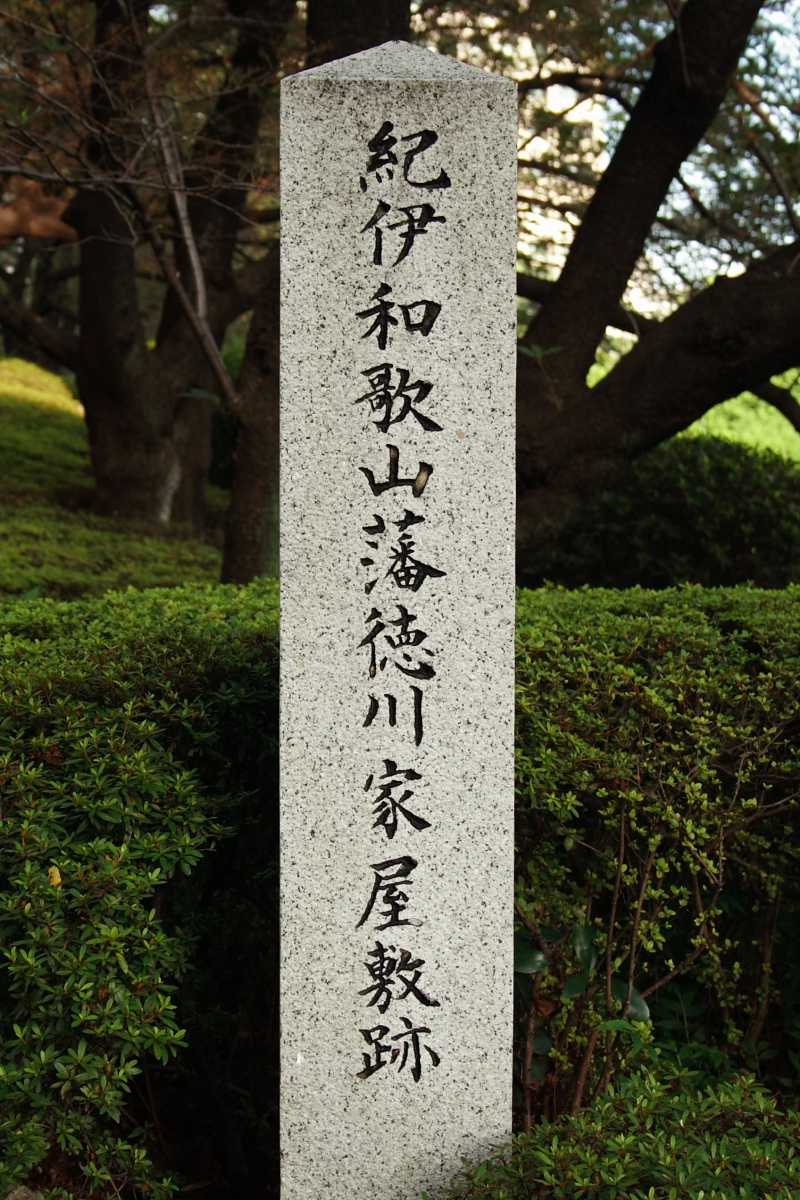
A guidepost marking the site of a residence for the Kishu-Tokugawa clan.

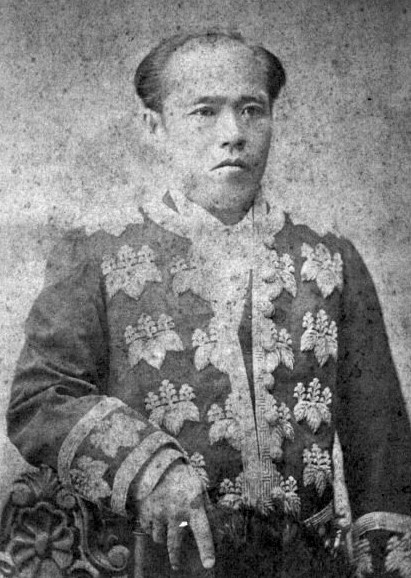
Tokugawa Mochitsugu, final daimyo of Kishu Domain

The Kishū Domain (紀州藩, Kishū-han), also referred to as Kii Domain or Wakayama Domain, was a feudal domain in Kii Province, Japan. This domain encompassed regions in present-day Wakayama and southern Mie prefectures and had a substantial income of 555,000 koku. The administrative center of the domain was located at Wakayama Castle, which is situated in present-day Wakayama, Wakayama Prefecture.

== History ==
After the Battle of Sekigahara in 1600, Asano Yukinaga, the lord of Kai Province, was granted Kii Province. This led to the establishment of the Kishu Domain, which governed the Asano clan of Tozama. However, in 1619, the Asano clan was relocated to the Hiroshima Domain in Aki Province under the leadership of Fukushima Masanori. At the same time, Tokugawa Yorinobu, the tenth son of Tokugawa Ieyasu and the former lord of the Sunpu Domain, merged the former territory of Asano with 555,000 koku. This expansion included Minami Ise and Kishu, which was the main domain governed by the Kii-Tokugawa clan. As a result, the domain was officially established.

Tokugawa Yorinobu recruited Rōnin and raised suspicions during the Keian Incident in 1651, allegedly challenging the Shogun. Tokugawa Tsunanori, Yorinobu's grandson and third lord of the domain, married Tokugawa Tsuruhime, the eldest daughter of the fifth shogun, but died prematurely. Tokugawa Yoshimune, Tsunanori's younger brother and 5th lord of the domain, became the 8th Shogun after a series of events, bringing over 200 feudal retainers from the Kishū clan to Edo. Tokugawa Munenao, the sixth lord of the domain, who inherited the clan from the branch domain after leaving Yoshimune, overcam the financial difficulties caused by the Kyoho Famine, which lost 57% of the amount of the amount of koku, with 20,000 ryo of public money borrowed, but after that, he followed the way to make up for this budget deficit with public money. The Wakayama Domain deepened its financial dependence on the shogunate because it was close to the Shogun, and on the other hand, this became a factor that put pressure on the shogunate's finances.

The 11th lord of the domain, Tokugawa Nariyuki, lost his worship debt during the Tenmei era, and borrowed a new 20,000 bale from the shogunate's Osaka Kurazumemai. The balance of the debt reached 45,000 ryo.

Keifuku, the 13th lord of the domain, was the grandson of the 11th Shogun Tokugawa Ienari, and in 1858, he inherited the Shogun family after Iesada, the 13th Shogun without children, and became the 14th Shogun Iemochi. All the successive shoguns after the 8th Shogun Yoshimune were occupied by the Kishu Domain and the Hitotsubashi-Tokugawa family, which was a branch of it.

Following the abolition of the han system in July 1871, significant changes occurred in the administrative divisions of Japan. The territories of Kishū, Tanabe, and Shingū were transformed into separate entities known as Kishū Prefecture, Tanabe Prefecture, and Shingū Prefecture, respectively. However, these prefectures were short-lived as they were dissolved in November of the same year. This dissolution led to the establishment of the present-day Mie and Wakayama prefectures, which continue to exist to this day.

== List of daimyo ==
#	Name	Tenure	Courtesy title	Court Rank	kokudaka
Asano clan, 1600–1619 (Shinpan daimyo)
1	Asano Yoshinaga (浅野吉永)	1600–1613	Sakyo no daibu (左京大夫)	Junior 5th Rank, Lower Grade (従五位下)	550,000 koku
2	Asano Nagaakira (浅野長明)	1613–1619	Uhyoe no suke (ウヒョエノスケ)	Junior 4th Rank, Lower Grade (従五位下)	550,000 koku
Kishu-Tokugawa clan, 1619–1871 (Shinpan daimyo)
1	Tokugawa Yorinobu (徳川頼信)	1619–1667	Hitachi no suke (常陸介)	Junior 4th Rank, Lower Grade (従五位下)	550,000 koku
2	Tokugawa Mitsusada (徳川光貞)	1667–1698	Hitachi no suke (常陸介)	Junior 4th Rank, Lower Grade (従五位下)	550,000 koku
3	Tokugawa Tsunanori (徳川綱則)	1698–1705	Hitachi no suke (常陸介)	Junior 4th Rank, Lower Grade (従五位下)	550,000 koku
4	Tokugawa Yorimoto (徳川頼本)	1705	Sakone no shoshone (左近衛中将)	Junior 4th Rank, Lower Grade (従五位下)	550,000 koku
5	Tokugawa Yoshimune - later became shogun (徳川吉宗)	1705 –1716	Sakonoe gon no chujo (左近衛中将)	Junior 3rd Rank, Lower Grade (従五位下)	550,000 koku
6	Tokugawa Munenao (徳川宗直)	1716–1757	Genba no kami(玄蕃神)	Junior 4th Rank, Lower Grade (従五位下)	550,000 koku
7	Tokugawa Munemasa (徳川宗正)	1757–1765	Hitachi no suke (常陸介)	Junior 4th Rank, Lower Grade (従五位下)	550,000 koku
8	Tokugawa Shigenori (徳川重則)	1765–1775	Hitachi no suke (常陸介)	Junior 4th Rank, Lower Grade (従五位下)	550,000 koku
9	Tokugawa Harusada (徳川治定)	1775–1789	Sakon no shoshone (左近衛中将)	Junior 4th Rank, Lower Grade (従五位下)	550,000 koku
10	Tokugawa Harutomi (徳川晴臣)	1789–1824	Hitachi no suke (常陸介)	Junior 4th Rank, Lower Grade (従五位下)	550,000 koku
11	Tokugawa Nariyuki (徳川斉之)	1824–1846	Sakonoe gon no chujo (左近衛中将)	Junior 2nd Rank, Lower Grade (従五位下)	550,000 koku
12	Tokugawa Narikatsu (徳川斉彊)	1846–1849	Sakon no chujo (左近中将)	Junior 3rd Rank, Lower Grade (従五位下)	550,000 koku
13	Tokugawa Yoshitomi (later became shogun (徳川義富)	1849–1858	Sakonoe no chujo (左近衛中将)	Junior 3rd Rank, Lower Grade (従五位下)	550,000 koku
14	Tokugawa Mochitsugu (徳川持次)	1858–1871	Sakonoe no chujo (左近衛中将)	Junior 3rd Rank, Lower Grade (従五位下)	550,000 koku

== See also ==
- List of Han
- Abolition of the han system

=== Simplified family tree ===
- Tokugawa Ieyasu, 1st Tokugawa Shōgun (1543–1616; r. 1603–1605)
  - I. Yorinobu, 1st Lord of Kishū (cr. 1619) (1602–1671; r. 1619–1667)
    - II. Mitsusada, 2nd Lord of Kishū (1627–1705; r. 1667–1698)
      - III. Tsunanori, 3rd Lord of Kishū (1665–1705; r. 1698–1705)
      - IV. Yorimoto, 4th Lord of Kishū (1680–1705; r. 1705)
      - V. Tokugawa Yoshimune, 5th Lord of Kishū, 8th Tokugawa Shōgun (1684–1751; Lord of Kishū: 1705–1716; Shōgun: 1716–1745)
        - Munetada, 1st head of the Hitotsubashi-Tokugawa line (1721–1765)
          - Harusada, 2nd head of the Hitotsubashi-Tokugawa line (1751–1827)
            - Tokugawa Ienari, 11th Tokugawa Shōgun (1773–1841; r. 1786–1841)
              - Tokugawa Ieyoshi, 12th Tokugawa Shogun
                - Tokugawa Iesada, 13th Tokugawa Shogun
              - XI. Nariyuki, 11th Lord of Kishū (1801–1846; r. 1824–1846)
                - XIII. Yoshitomi, 13th Lord of Kishū, 14th Tokugawa Shōgun (as Tokugawa Iemochi) (1846–1866; Lord: 1849–1858; Shōgun: 1858–1866)
              - XII. Narikatsu, 12th Lord of Kishū (1820–1849; r. 1846–1849)
            - Narimasa, 4th head of the Tayasu-Tokugawa line (1779–1848)
              - Yoshiyori, 8th head of the Tayasu-Tokugawa line (1828–1876)
                - Yorimichi, 15th family head, 2nd Marquess (1872–1925; 15th family head: 1906–1925; 2nd Marquess: 1906–1925)
                  - Yorisada, 16th family head, 3rd Marquess (1892–1954; 16th family head: 1925–1954; 3rd Marquess: 1925–1947)
                    - Yoriaki, 17th family head (1917–1958; 17th family head: 1954–1958)
                  - Takako (b. 1926); m. Tokugawa (Aoyama) Tsuyoshi, 18th family head (b. 1924; 18th family head: 1958–1965)
                    - Noriko, 19th family head (b. 1956; 19th family head: 1965–present)
    - Matsudaira Yorizumi, 1st Lord of Saijō (1641–1711)
      - VI. Munenao, 6th Lord of Kishū (1682–1757; r. 1716–1757)
        - VII. Munemasa, 7th Lord of Kishū (1720–1765; r. 1757–1765)
          - VIII. Shigenori, 8th Lord of Kishū (1746–1829; r. 1765–1775)
          - Matsudaira Yorikata, 6th Lord of Saijō (1755–1806)
            - Matsudaira Yoriyuki, 8th Lord of Saijō (1785–1848)
              - Matsudaira Yorisatō, 9th Lord of Saijō (1809–1865)
                - XIV. Mochitsugu, 14th Lord of Kishū and family head, 1st Marquess (1844–1906; Lord: 1858–1869; Governor: 1869–1871; Marquess: 1884)
            - X. Harutomi, 10th Lord of Kishū (1771–1853; r. 1789–1824)
        - IX. Harusada, 9th Lord of Kishū (1728–1789; r. 1775–1789)
