= Tokugawa Yorinobu =

Japanese daimyō

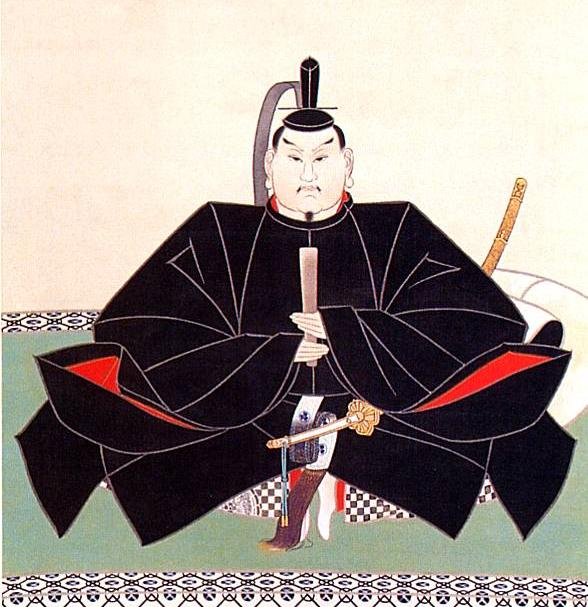
Tokugawa Yorinobu.

Tokugawa Yorinobu (徳川 頼宣, April 28, 1602 – February 19, 1671) was a Japanese daimyō of the early Edo period.

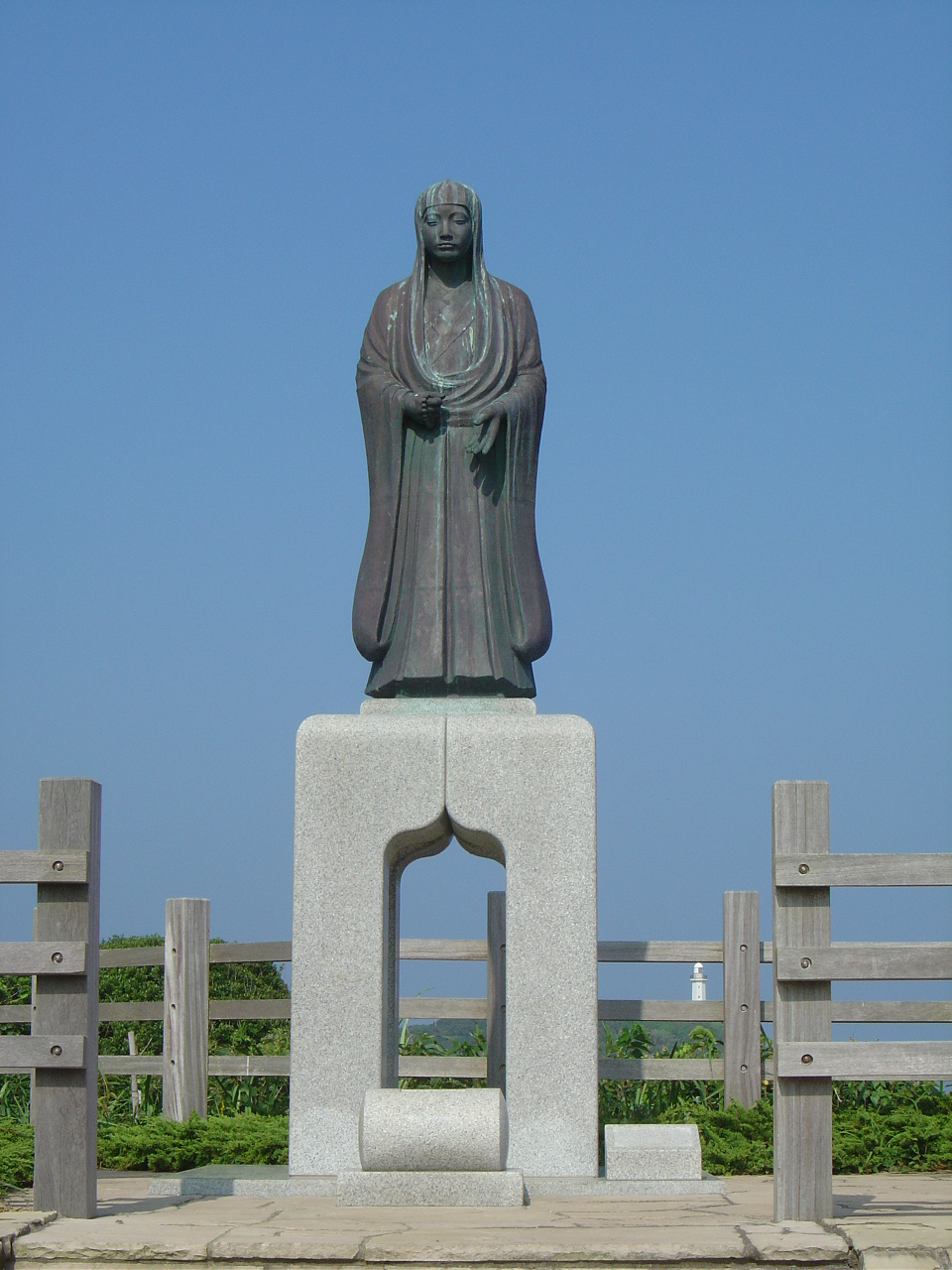
Kageyama-dono, mother of Yorinobu and Yorifusa.

Born under the name Nagatomimaru (長福丸), he was the 10th son of Tokugawa Ieyasu, by his concubine Kageyama-dono. On December 8, 1603, Yorinobu received the fief of Mito, then rated at 200,000 koku, as his fief. Mito had formerly belonged to his older brother, Takeda Nobuyoshi. Following his stipend increase to 250,000 koku in October 1604, he came of age on September 12, 1606, taking the name Yorimasa, and receiving the court rank of junior 4th, lower grade (ju-shi-i-ge) and the title of Hitachi no Suke. On January 6, 1610, he was transferred to a 500,000 koku fief in Suruga and Tōtōmi Provinces (thereby founding Sunpu Domain centered on Sunpu Castle), and took the name Yorinobu. However, after a little under a decade in Suruga, he was transferred to the 550,000 koku Wakayama Domain on August 27, 1619, following the transfer of the previous rulers, the Asano clan, to Hiroshima, in Aki Province. Yorinobu thus became the founder of the Kii branch of the Tokugawa family. Yorinobu's wife, Yorin-in (1601-1666) was the daughter of Katō Kiyomasa. By the end of his life, Yorinobu had achieved junior 2nd court rank (ju-ni-i), as well as holding the title of dainagon ("major counselor").

Yorinobu had four children: his successor Tokugawa Mitsusada, Yorizumi, the founder of the Iyo-Saijo Domain, Inaba-hime, who married Ikeda Mitsunaka of the Tottori Domain, and Matsuhime, who married Matsudaira Nobuhira of the Yoshii Domain. Following his death, he was referred to by the title Nanryū-in.

In 1915, Yorinobu was posthumously promoted to senior 2nd court rank (shō-ni-i).

== Family ==
- Father: Tokugawa Ieyasu
- Mother: Kageyama-dono (1580–1653) later Yoju-in
- Wife: Yasohime later Yorin-in (1601-1666)
- Concubines:
  - Yamada-dono
  - Nakagawa-dono
  - Ochi no Kata
- Children:
  - Tokugawa Mitsusada by Nakagawa-dono
  - Shuri by Yamada-dono
  - Matsudaira Yorizumi (1641-1711) by Ochi no Kata
  - Inabahime married Ikeda Mitsunaka by Ochi no Kata
  - Matsuhime married Matsudaira Nobuhira by Ochi no Kata

== Ancestry ==
Ancestors of Tokugawa Yorinobu

8. Matsudaira Kiyoyasu (1511-1535)
4. Matsudaira Hirotada (1526-1549)
9. Aoki
2. Tokugawa Ieyasu, 1st Tokugawa Shōgun (1543-1616)
10. Mizuno Tadamasa (1493-1543)
5. O-dainokata (1528-1602)
11. Keyōin (1492-1560)
1. Tokugawa Yorinobu, 1st daimyō of Kishū
12. Masaki Tokitada (1521-1576)
6. Masaki Yoritada (1551-1622)
13. Kasutani
3. Yōjuin (1580-1653)
7. Hōjō

Royal titles
Preceded by Takeda Nobuyoshi	Lord of Mito; 1603-1609	Succeeded by Tokugawa Yorifusa
Preceded by Tenryō	Lord of Sunpu; 1609–1619	Succeeded by Tenryō
Preceded by Asano Nagaakira	Lord of Kishū; 1619–1667	Succeeded by Tokugawa Mitsusada

== See also ==
- Chōhō-ji
