= Telethon =

Fundraising event broadcast on television

A telethon (a portmanteau of "television" and "marathon") is a televised fundraising event that lasts many hours or days, the purpose of which is to raise money for a charitable, political or other cause.

Most telethons feature heavy solicitations for pledges (promises to donate funds at a later time) by masters of ceremonies or hosts, who are often local celebrities or media personalities combined with variety show style entertainment such as singers, bands and instrumentalists. In some cases, telethons feature content related to the cause being supported, such as interviews with charitable beneficiaries, tours of charity-supported projects, or pre-taped sequences. The equivalent term for a radio broadcast is a radiothon; most radiothons do not include live entertainment.

In the United States, the first telethon used for political outreach occurred in 1960.

The highest donating telethon per capita in the world is the Channel Seven Perth Telethon in Perth, Western Australia. It has raised over AU$850 million since 1968, and raised AU$101 million in 2026.

The most watched Telethon in the world is Teletón Chile in the nation of Chile to raise funds to help children with developmental disabilities. Since its beginning in 1978, it has raised more than CL$700 billion (US$1,000 million) from the citizens of the nation and international viewers, and raised US$50 million in 2026.

== History ==
=== United States ===
On April 9, 1949, Milton Berle hosted the first-ever telethon, raising $1,100,000 for the Damon Runyon Cancer Research Foundation over the course of 16 hours. The first published appearance of the word "telethon" was in the prior day's newspapers.

One of the first continuing annual telethons in the United States was the United Cerebral Palsy (UCP) telethon. Television executive Leonard Goldenson and his wife had a daughter with cerebral palsy, and with the help of other affected parents, launched the UCP Telethon in 1950, with early television personality Dennis James as host. He continued to host New York-based segments on the telethon through the 1980s. The telethon is now defunct, as UCP raises funds through other means, including its website. By 1955 televised telethons had become a familiar enough part of American culture to be parodied that year in the film noir Tight Spot as comic relief.

The oldest continuing annual telethon in the United States on the same channel is Green Bay, Wisconsin, station WBAY-TV (channel 2)'s local Cerebral Palsy telethon, which helps provide financial support for equipment for Cerebral Palsy, Inc., that began broadcasting as a 22-hour event on the first weekend of March 1954. As of 2025, WBAY has presented the telethon for 71 years.

Close behind the Green Bay telethon in longevity is the WHAS Crusade for Children in Louisville, Kentucky, which began in October 1954 on WHAS-TV (channel 11) and WHAS radio (840 AM). It is still broadcast on the two WHAS stations despite their being owned by different entities for three decades, and has expanded to radio and TV stations in other parts of Kentucky and Indiana, as well as a live stream on the internet. The Crusade is famous for the legions of firefighters who collect money at intersections throughout the area each May and June.

The most-broadcast telethon to date was January 22, 2010, Hope for Haiti Now telethon, to aid the victims of the January 10th earthquake. Viewers were able to text donations on cell phones, and it raised a reported $58 million by the next day. It was designed to show viewers a stark divide between them and the people surviving this catastrophic event.

=== Australia ===
Melbourne's Good Friday Appeal, which began in 1931, started its telethon in 1957 after the Seven Network joined as a sponsor.

Adelaide's first telethon was held at the Tynte Street, North Adelaide, studios of NWS9 in December 1960. One fundraiser was Barry Jones, then famous as a quiz champion. Viewers could, for a fee, attempt to "stump" him with their favorite question.

Prior to the establishment of their annual telethon in 1968, Perth station TVW broadcast one-off telethons for bushfire relief in 1961, and to raise funds for Christmas care packages sent to Western Australian soldiers serving in Vietnam in 1966 and 1967.

== Examples ==
=== The Americas ===
==== United States ====
In the United States, telethons are held for various charitable organizations; as of 2014, however, no national telethons currently exist.

The longest-running national telethon in the United States was The Jerry Lewis MDA Labor Day Telethon, which was staged for over 21 hours each Labor Day to benefit the Muscular Dystrophy Association between 1966 and 2010. From 2011 to 2013 it was trimmed down to six hours, then to three, and then to two hours. From 2012 it no longer served as a telethon in the traditional sense. It was discontinued in 2014. Other prior charities such as the St. Jude Children's Research Hospital, Easter Seals, Arthritis Foundation, and the Children's Miracle Network had produced telethons on a nationwide or regional basis.

Some radio stations produce annual pledge drives which are similar in format to telethons, but instead, use brief breaks between regular programs to appeal for funds.

Trinity Broadcasting Network (TBN), a religious television network, hosts non-stop, week-long, semi-annual telethons called "Praise-a-Thons". The Christian Broadcasting Network (CBN; producers of the long-running syndicated program The 700 Club) stages a modified form of a telethon thrice yearly, which runs for approximately one week but is shown for only an hour or so each day. In its early days, CBN's telethons were of the more traditional round-the-clock form; this format ended when the Pat Robertson-founded ministry sold The Family Channel (now Freeform), which no longer gave it access to a round-the-clock outlet for such telethons. However, on the Sunday before the Super Bowl, CBN continues to produce a 12-hour telethon which airs on Freeform and is syndicated to various television stations; the broadcast of the program on the cable channel was a condition inserted in a 1998 deal by International Family Entertainment (which acquired the channel from CBN in 1990) to sell The Family Channel to News Corporation, and remained in place after the channel's 2001 sale to The Walt Disney Company. Other religious stations and networks hold telethons as well, including West Coast Chabad Lubavitch since 1980.

For a brief time in the early 1970s, beginning in 1972, the Democratic Party even held annual telethons (two were called "America Goes Public" and "Answer, America!") to help it erase a multi-million dollar debt (this may have provided the inspiration for the 1979 comedy film Americathon, where a telethon is held to prevent national bankruptcy). The telethon idea was created and promoted by John Y. Brown, Jr., the businessman who built Kentucky Fried Chicken into a worldwide chain and later became Governor of Kentucky.

Local telethons, once a common fixture in nearly every major city in the United States, are now rare but still found in a handful of cities, including Louisville, Kentucky (WHAS Crusade for Children), Buffalo, New York (the Variety Club Telethon, held each winter for Variety, the Children's Charity; it began on what is now WGRZ in 1962 before spending most of its run on WKBW-TV from 1963 to 2019 and then moving back to WGRZ in 2020, with WBBZ-TV added as a broadcast partner that year); Green Bay, Wisconsin (WBAY-TV's annual March telethon for the locally based Cerebral Palsy Center); and Erie, Pennsylvania (the Community for Kanzius Telethon on WICU and WSEE for the Kanzius Cancer Research Foundation). New York City also features a telethon of sorts; the WFAN Radiothon, by virtue of its two drive time shows being simulcast on cable television, has portions covered on television. Since 2010, this has included the portion covering Boomer and Carton in the Morning on CBS Sports Network and Mike's On on Fox Sports 1/2. From 2002 to 2007, the shows in question were Imus in the Morning on MSNBC and Mike and the Mad Dog on YES; Imus revived the practice of hosting radiothons on his most recent radio broadcast homes, WABC and Fox Business Network.

Garden City High School in Garden City, Kansas, holds annual telethons to help fund the school's broadcasting, debate and forensics teams.

On December 14, 2012, Univision introduced the first ever Spanish-language telethon in the United States, Teletón USA, which is hosted by longtime Sábado Gigante host Mario Kreutzberger, known by his stage name Don Francisco. The total donation in the first edition was $8,150,625, 16.44% more than the intended goal of $7,000,000. For its 2013 edition, the goal went up to $15,215,029 and the total donation is now $15,313,525, a $98,496 increase.

==== Canada ====
There are no annual national telethons in Canada, although as in the U.S., many local children's hospitals operate regional telethons in collaboration with Children's Miracle Network Hospitals in early June. In addition, due to the proliferation of cable television piping in signals from the United States, a number of American telethons, such as the Jerry Lewis MDA Labor Day Telethon, attracted donations from Canada due to being broadcast there.

Notable regional telethons (outside of those produced by Children's Miracle Network) include:

- Telemiracle (March) in Saskatchewan benefiting the Kinsmen Foundation and currently seen on CTV stations in Saskatchewan. Since its inception in 1977, Telemiracle has raised over $100 million, including the record $7.1 million in the 2018 edition, held in Regina.
- Christmas Daddies (December), benefiting underprivileged children in Atlantic Canada and broadcast on CTV Atlantic stations.
- Show of Hearts (February) in British Columbia, supporting Variety, the Children's Charity and seen on CHAN-DT in Vancouver.
- CTV-Lion's Club Children's Christmas Telethon (December), buys Christmas presents for underprivileged children in Northern Ontario. The telethon is broadcast on CTV Northern Ontario stations and features local musical talent.

==== Chile ====
Since 1978, the major Chilean television networks hold an annual telethon called Teletón to raise funds to help children with developmental disabilities (most commonly cerebral palsy) in Instituto de Rehabilitación Infantil ("Infant Rehabilitation Institute") centers. Mario Kreutzberger, who is the symbol of "La Teletón" in Chile, has served as the telethon's host since its inception. The telethon is an event of national unity and is proportionally, the most widely watched and most donated telethon in the world.

There is also a local telethon running, the Days for the Disabled Magellanic Children (Jornadas por el Niño Impedido Magallánico), to raise funds to help disabled children of the Magallanes and Última Esperanza provinces, in an effort led by the local Lions Club. The 2006 Days broadcast raised US$515,000.

During March 2010, a special telethon called Chile ayuda a Chile (Chile helps Chile) was broadcast to raise money to help those affected by a devastating earthquake that struck the southern part of central Chile on February 27 of that year. The aim was to raise $15,000,000,000 Chilean Pesos for the construction of 30 thousand emergency homes in the disaster area. In the end, that amount tripled, having been gathered over 46 billion Chilean pesos ($90 million), the biggest amount of money collected from a Telethon in history.

==== Honduras ====
Since 1987, all television networks in Honduras hold a 27-hour telethon every December to raise funds to help children with disabilities in support of "Fundación Teleton" (Telethon Foundation), a charity under the leadership of businessman Rafael Ferrari. Many international artists, television presenters and journalists participate in the event. TACA Airlines provides free transportation for international invitees. Local banks are open around-the-clock during the Telethon, to enable viewers to donate through their local banks.

==== Mexico ====
Like Chile and Honduras in December of every year since 1997 the Mexican television network Televisa, in conjunction with other networks, both public and private (except rivals Azteca and Imagen, the latter since 2016), hold a 24-hour telethon with the purpose to raise funds to help children with disabilities. The event is organized by the "Fundación Teletón".

During the transmission of the event especially in the television broadcasting many Mexican media personalities shows testimonies of children and their families who overcame their disabilities. The final act with the Telethon is a concert in the Estadio Azteca with the performance of many national and international artists and singers. Because Televisa programming also airs in the United States on Univision and border city Televisa stations, some additional contributions and pledges come from American viewers.

==== Brazil ====
The marathon broadcast under the name Teleton by SBT was conceived by Décio Goldfarb, Clovis Scripilliti and Hebe Camargo who asked the owner of SBT, Silvio Santos, to broadcast the program. The collections are passed on to "Associação de Assistência à Criança Deficiente" (AACD) – Portuguese for Association for Assistance to Disabled Children.

The first edition was held between 17 and 18 May 1998, and since then, 14 rehabilitation centers, a home school and a hospital for rehabilitation operations and exams are created. Another rehabilitation center was in construction but the same was canceled due to the financial crisis Brazil had been suffering since 2015, also two rehabilitation centers have closed and another three were municipalized, making the total of centers down to nine.

The edition of 2019 was held on 25 and 26 October. It had a goal of R$30 million, and raised R$32 450 054 (US$8,106,231) after almost 26 hours of broadcast, making a new record total. In 2018, AACD helped over 8,000 people with physical disabilities.

==== Haiti ====
"Hope for Haiti Now" was a telethon based in the United States. It was organized as a humanitarian relief effort in response to the 2010 Haiti Earthquake.

=== Europe ===
==== Austria ====
Licht ins Dunkel (literally: "light in the dark") is an annual telethon held in Austria to help disabled persons.

==== Spain ====
In Catalonia, public television broadcaster Televisió de Catalunya broadcasts an annual telethon (La Marató de TV3)(in Catalan) for several diseases. In 2018, it raised €15,068,252 for cancer research. €197,340,632 have been collected since the first edition in 1992.

==== France ====
In France, since 1987, an annual Téléthon, for the muscular dystrophy charity in France (see also Décrypthon), L'Association française contre les myopathies, is held by France 2 on the first or second weekend in December, with the support of France 3 and France 5, and the public radio networks (France Inter, France Info, France Bleu). Several events are organized all around France. Donations are made by telephone or at the Téléthon's website, or on mobile web portals, as well as through SMS messaging (and also Minitel in the past). The 2024 edition earned €79,801,520 during the program and €96,553,593 after final collection. Between 1987 and 2024, the total amount collected is estimated to be almost 3 billion euros (see the details).

==== Ireland ====
In Ireland, the RTÉ People in Need Telethon was held roughly every two years in May, from 1989 to 2007, although there was no Telethon in 2003 due to Special Olympics and the sponsorship/volunteering needed, and it was moved to October 26 in 2007. During the 2004 telethon, over 4,000 fundraising events were organised by people nationwide, and proceeds were subsequently distributed to almost 760 projects in the 26 counties.

Since its inception, over €35 million has been raised by the People in Need through the RTÉ People in Need Telethon, supporting a wide variety of charitable organizations nationwide. Eight telethons have been held to date and over €35 million has been distributed in grants, ranging from €150 to €50,000, to thousands of organisations throughout Ireland. Grant applications are assessed by advisory committees in each region before final approval by the Board of Directors of the Trust. Money raised in each county stays in each county.

==== Italy ====
In Italy, since 1990, Telethon is also held by RAI in December, and in 2006 (when the event was held from December 15–17) donors had raised €30,740,000 for research into cures for genetic diseases. By 2009, a total of €284,000,000 have been collected since 1990.

The creators of the Italian version are Susanna Agnelli and the Italian Union for the fight against muscular dystrophy.

==== Netherlands ====
The first nationwide telethon in the Netherlands was Open Het Dorp ("Open The Village"), which was classic in format, broadcasting for 23 hours on television and radio from 26 to 27 November 1962. Funds were raised to build and open a special village/community for disabled people.

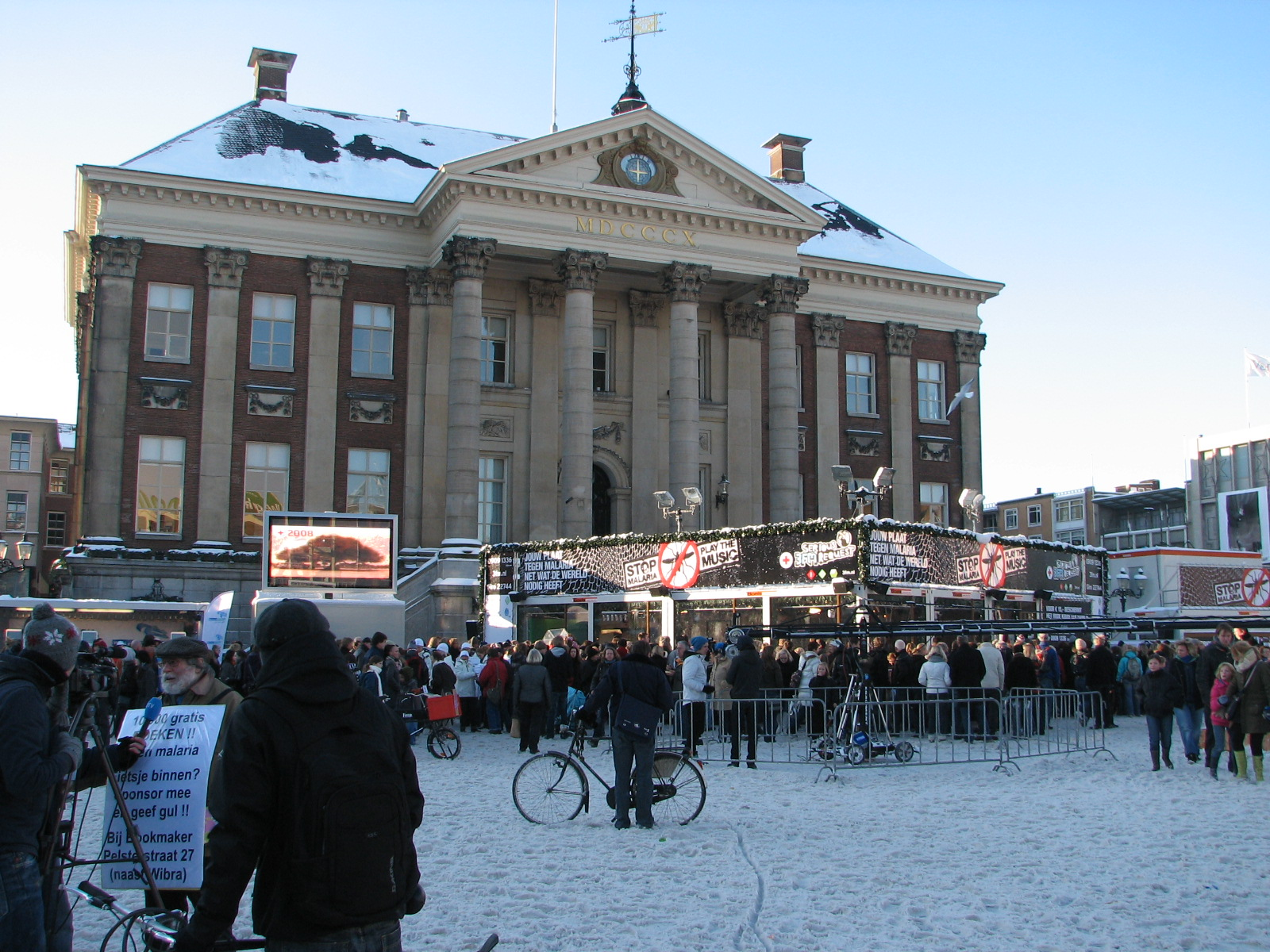
The "Glass House" radiothon studio of Serious Request in Groningen's market square in 2009, in front of its city hall

In 1984 for the first time a number of Dutch humanitarian aid organisations collaborated with a combination of broadcasters, to raise funds through a unified effort: "Eén voor Afrika" (One for Africa). With a combination of 10 hours of television and 18 hours of radio broadcast, €44 million was raised. After another such action in 1987, the organisations decided to sign a permanent cooperation agreement as the Samenwerkende Hulporganisaties (or SHO, meaning Cooperating Aid Organizations). Although the campaigns gradually moved away from classic telethons over the years, the SHO raised some €700 million in forty nationwide efforts since it started.

Starting in 2004 an annual multi-day radiothon called Serious Request is hosted by national pop music station 3FM in the week before Christmas. Three popular radio DJs are locked up for six days in a small temporary radio studio (the "Glass House"), placed in a main square of a Dutch city. Living on a juice-only fast, the DJs make an interactive, themed broadcast around the clock, to raise funds and awareness for International Red Cross initiatives. Regular programming on the station is suspended — instead 3FM and its website are completely dedicated to the event, which is also transmitted as a continuous audio and video live-stream. Additionally there is television coverage, integration with social media, and a dedicated mobile app. All totalled the eleven editions have raised €76.8 million.

Serious Request spin-off projects have since been adopted in Belgium, Switzerland, Sweden, Kenya, South Korea, Austria, Latvia and Portugal.

==== Norway ====
TV-aksjonen (English: "The TV Campaign/Auction") is an annual national Norwegian charity fund raising event that since 1974 has been run by Norwegian public broadcaster NRK in conjunction with selected organizations. The fundraiser is the world's largest, measured in terms of donated value per capita and number of participants. The event is central to Norwegian society inasmuch as it is viewed as the most famous and trusted charity fundraiser in the country. The campaign is held on a Sunday in October each year, and on the selected day NRK devotes most of its airtime to informing the public about the organization and that year's special cause.

Contributions are collected in a number of ways. Central to the campaign is the door-to-door campaign of approximately 100,000 volunteers servicing all 1.8 million Norwegian households, as well as donations accepted via telephone or by funds transfer to the campaign's bank account. NRK also hosts a live auction of various items and experiences, with proceeds also going to that year's selected charity. Several organizations donate considerable amounts, as does the government of Norway on behalf of the Norwegian people.

==== Ukraine ====
Since the start of the invasion in the prelude to the 2022 Russian invasion of Ukraine on February 24, 2022, most Ukrainian television channels switched over to the signal of Rada TV. The channel was made state-owned at the end of 2021. Following February 26, 2022, the four biggest broadcasters including the TV channels 1+1, 2+2, 24 Kanal, and TRC Ukraina began broadcasting a 24/7 united newscast called "United News" ("Єдині новини") that is produced in turn by the various channels and amended with official information by governmental agencies to "objectively and promptly provide comprehensive information from different regions of the country 24/7".

==== United Kingdom ====
In the United Kingdom, the ITV Telethons were three charity telethons organised and televised in the UK by the ITV network. The broadcasts took place in 1988, 1990 and 1992. Each lasted for 27 hours and all were hosted by Michael Aspel.

Regular telethons are held for charitable groups such as Comic Relief's Red Nose Day and Sport Relief, and the BBC's Children in Need. Some of these occur every year, with millions of pounds raised to support various charities. These usually include music artists, sketches, and other various segments, often with videos in between each segment or song to promote the charity that money is being raised for, usually children in either Africa or the United Kingdom. In 2012/2013, Children in Need raised £26 million and Comic Relief £75 million; a combined total of £101 million ($151 million). Children in Need is well known for its nationwide link-up performances such as the choir that has been running since 2011 featuring over 1500 children in choirs of about 150 singing one song in unison from about 10 locations around the UK. This is usually the point where the telethon receives the most donations.

From 2011 to 2015, ITV held their Text Santa telethon in the buildup to Christmas. The telethon lasted for three hours and was hosted by three ITV presenting duos, Ant & Dec, Phillip Schofield and Christine Bleakley, and Paddy McGuinness and Alesha Dixon, each duo hosting an hour each. Text Santa supported six UK charities; these were Alzheimer's Society, The Guide Dogs for the Blind Association, Marie Curie, Teenage Cancer Trust, Together for Short Lives and WellChild.

Since 2012, Channel 4 has hosted Stand Up to Cancer. The inaugural telethon was presented by Channel 4 faces Davina McCall, Alan Carr and Christian Jessen. All three returned to present the next telethon in 2014, which also had segments hosted by The Last Leg presenters Adam Hills, Josh Widdicombe and Alex Brooker. The 2014 telethon came live from Westminster's Methodist Central Hall.

=== Asia ===
==== Japan ====
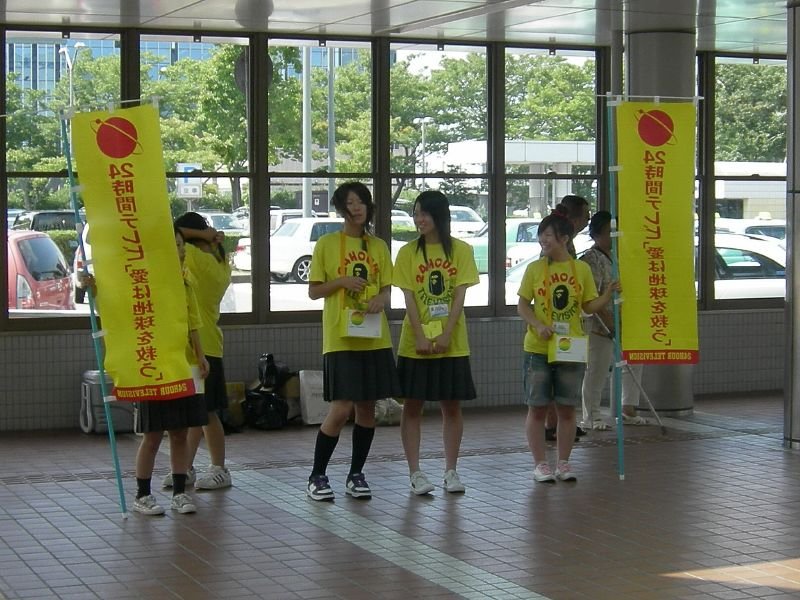
Fundraising for 24 Hour Television at Kanazawa-Bunko Station, 2007

In Japan, Nippon Television hosts its annual telethon titled 24 Hour Television: Love Saves The Earth (24時間テレビ 「愛は地球を救う」(in Japanese), Niju-yojikan Terebi: "Ai wa Chikyū o Sukū") during the final weekend of August, broadcast live from the Ryōgoku Kokugikan arena. Started in 1978, its objective is to raise funds for various charities that aid the sick, the handicapped, victims of war and natural disasters around the world and environmental programmes. Every year, during the live broadcast, a popular television personality attempts to run a 100 km marathon for this worthy cause. Despite its title, the telethon runs for approximately 27 hours.

The 2011 telethon's funds were donated to organizations to help rebuild the prefectures that were damaged in the 2011 Tohoku earthquake.

FNS Day (ja:FNSの日) (in Japanese) is an annual telethon hosted by Fuji Television which started in 1987 and airs during the final weekend of July.

==== Hong Kong ====
In Hong Kong, Tung Wah Charity Show is an annual telethon (known locally as "charity show") organised by Television Broadcasts Limited and is held on a Saturday or Sunday in December.

==== Israel ====
In Israel, for many years an annual telethon is held for those serving in the Israeli Defense Forces (IDF).

A telethon is called "teletrom" in Hebrew (Hebrew טלתרום), "trom" meaning donate.

Telethons have also been held for endangered children on Israeli channel 2, the broadcast is called "Yom Tov" (Hebrew "יום טוב"), meaning "Good Day" in English.

==== Singapore ====
In Singapore, Ren Ci Charity Show is an annual telethon (known locally as "charity show") organised by Mediacorp. Other charity shows in Singapore include NKF Charity Show.

=== Oceania ===
==== Australia ====
===== Perth =====
The annual Channel Seven Perth Telethon is run by Perth-based Seven Network station TVW and the Channel 7 Telethon Trust and is broadcast throughout Western Australia on the Seven Network. Starting in 1968, the annual 26-hour continuous broadcast runs on a weekend, usually in October, commencing at 7.00pm on Saturday night. The two major beneficiaries of Telethon are Perth Children's Hospital (and previously Princess Margaret Hospital for Children) and the Telethon Kids Institute along with numerous other additional beneficiaries (in 2021, there were 65 beneficiaries).

In 2017, TVW held its 50th Telethon, raising a then-record A$36.4 million ($10 million more than the previous year), which amounted to $13.94 per head of population in WA. The largest amount raised on Perth's Telethon was set in 2026, which saw A$101 million donated. Since 1968, Perth's Telethon has raised over A$850 million in total.

A number of international celebrities have visited Perth to appear on the Telethon, such as Michael Jackson, Celine Dion, Harry Connick, Jr., Stevie Wonder, Sammy Davis Jr., Tina Turner, Julian Lennon, Whitney Houston, Def Leppard, and Elton John (who performed live for the event from the opening night of Perth Arena in 2012). A number of Australian television personalities and actors also fly across the country for the weekend, including stars from Seven Network programs such as Sunrise, The Morning Show and Home and Away.

During the 1970s and 1980s, TVW's rival station, the Nine Network's STW also broadcast its own telethon, known as Appealathon.

===== Melbourne =====
HSV7 in Melbourne holds the Good Friday Appeal telethon, which benefits the Royal Children's Hospital in Melbourne on Good Friday every year. It airs across Victoria all day on Seven Network station HSV and Prime Television. It also has a print and radio component via Melbourne's Herald Sun newspaper as well as radio station Mix 101.1. In 2007, the radio partner was Southern Cross Broadcasting. The event has become an annual part of Melbourne culture, and continues to bring in record fundraising efforts across the entire state. In 2015, the appeal raised A$17.1 million.

===== Adelaide =====
NWS9 in Adelaide aired Telethon broadcasts throughout the 1960s and 1970s including raising money for "The House Of Hope" a home that would be built each year for Telethon. Local television stars from all channels would visit channel 9 across the live broadcast weekend to participate in the Telethon. Musicians from interstate would also travel to Adelaide for the round-the-clock marathon broadcast. It was the only time of the year that an Adelaide television station continued to broadcast during the overnight hours.

In the 1970s, SAS10 created the Children's Medical Research Foundation and the "Channel 10 Christmas Appeal" with stars from the network flying into Adelaide for the weekend live broadcast from SAS10 studios in Gilberton. Stars participating in the broadcast included actors from the popular SAS10 programmes Number 96 and The Box. Game show host Garry Meadows was the anchor for most years. It is this event where the tune "Thank You Very Much for Your Kind Donation" originated, which would be played whenever a major donation was announced during the broadcast with members of the cast forming a conga line and dancing around the studio.

===== Newcastle =====
NBN Television in Newcastle, New South Wales regularly held telethons every two years throughout the 1970s and 1980s for local charities such as children's hospitals and cancer units. However, with aggregation and the station being affiliated in the early 1990s, these went by the wayside but a few have still been held since, the last occurring in 2002.

===== Sydney =====
In Sydney, Nine Network station TCN broadcasts the Gold Week Telethon on the second Monday of June (the Queen's Birthday), in benefit for the Sydney Children's Hospital. Established in 2010, the telethon serves as a finale for a week of fundraising for the hospital, known as "Gold Week", which generally runs the first week of June.

The sixth telethon in 2015 was hosted by presenters of the Nine Network's Today show, with various network celebrities including Darryl Brohman and Miranda Tapsell manning the phone lines; the telethon also featured various music performers. A total of $5.2mn was raised for the hospital, breaking expectations and creating a new record.

===== One-off telethons =====
Throughout Australia, there have been several national telethons during the 2000s. One was held to aid victims of the 2004 tsunami that hit parts of Indonesia, Sri Lanka and India, which killed over 200,000 people. This telethon was simulcast by all three commercial networks, Seven, Nine and Ten. There were other telethons around the world raising money for that event.

On February 12, 2009, the Nine Network held a special telethon to benefit the victims of the 2009 Victorian bushfires, through the Australian Red Cross. Titled Australia Unites – The Victorian Bushfire Appeal, the event was hosted by Nine Network personality Eddie McGuire, and accompanied by many celebrities, athletes and entertainers. Some of the celebrities to have appeared included Russell Crowe, Nicole Kidman, Keith Urban, Orlando Bloom, Hugh Jackman, Anthony La Paglia, Rachel Griffiths and Simon Baker. Rove McManus from rival Ten Network made a special guest appearance. The telethon raised about A$20.5 million from pledges.

On January 9, 2011, the Flood Relief Appeal: Australia Unites telethon, in response to the 2010–2011 Queensland floods, was broadcast by the Nine Network from Brisbane's Suncorp Piazza raised more than A$10 million in pledged aid.

==== New Zealand ====
Telethons were broadcast nationwide in New Zealand between 1975 and 1990 on TV2 and its successor networks, South Pacific Television and TVNZ. Additional telethons were later produced by TV3 in 1993 and 2009, as well as special fundraising broadcasts in subsequent years.

The first New Zealand telethon was held on 5–6 July 1975 on TV2, coinciding with the network’s launch, and raised $557,162 for St John Ambulance. Early telethons were broadcast from television studios in the main centres, but later events moved to large venues such as exhibition halls and indoor stadiums, allowing members of the public to attend. The events also involved widespread public participation, with communities organising fundraising activities in the lead-up to each broadcast.

As with Australian telethons, the song "Thank You Very Much for Your Kind Donation" (a cover of "Thank U Very Much" by The Scaffold) was played whenever a large donation was announced.

| Year | Date | Network | Charity | Total raised | Inflation-adjusted (2026) |
|---|---|---|---|---|---|
| 1975 | 5–6 July | TV2 | St John Ambulance Association | $557,162 | $7,004,000 |
| 1976 | 3–4 July | TV2 | National Child Health Foundation | $1,300,000 | $13,979,000 |
| 1977 | 25–26 June | SPTV | Mental Health Foundation | $2,005,750 | $18,855,000 |
| 1978 | 1–2 July | SPTV | Arthritis and Rheumatism Foundation | $3,002,750 | $25,211,000 |
| 1979 | 30 June – 1 July | SPTV | International Year of the Child Telethon Trust | $2,765,321 | $20,421,000 |
| 1981 | 27–28 June | TV One | International Year of Disabled Persons Telethon Trust | $5,001,981 | $27,327,000 |
| 1983 | 25–26 June | TV One | New Zealand Family Trust | $4,038,416 | $17,692,000 |
| 1985 | 29–30 June | TV One | Child and Youth Development Trust | $6,007,722 | $21,478,000 |
| 1988 | 25–26 June | TV2 | New Zealand Home and Neighbourhood Trust | $5,503,413 | $14,116,000 |
| 1990 | 1–2 September | TV2 | Celebration of Age Trust | $4,526,601 | $11,611,000 |

In December 1991, an emergency fundraising 16-hour telethon was hurriedly arranged after a devastating cyclone flattened most of Western Samoa. The total raised was just over $1.5 million with the Government of New Zealand matching the dollar amount, bringing the total to just over $3 million.

In 1993, TV3 hosted a 22-hour telethon to raise funds for the Starship Children's Hospital. Events focused on the two main venues at Auckland's Aotea Centre and Wellington's Shed 6, with roving crews based in Christchurch, Dunedin, Hamilton and the rest of the country. The event raised just over $1.5 million.

TV3 broadcast a 23-hour telethon "The Big Night In" to support KidsCan, which aired on August 8 and 9, 2009. The event raised $1,944,225.

In collaboration with the New Zealand Government, Three, Māori Television, TVNZ 2 and various online platforms simulcast an eight-hour telethon on 16 October 2021, known as the 'Vaxathon', to support the country's COVID-19 vaccination effort.

Some regional stations have also operated their own local telethons to fund local facilities and other organisations.

=== Worldwide ===
For nine years, Armenia Fund held an annual international telethon that was broadcast to all major U.S. cities and across the globe. The 12-hour live program is able to raise millions for humanitarian and infrastructure development programs in Armenia and Karabakh. The annual telethon is held on Thanksgiving every year. During Armenia Fund's 10th International Telethon, held on November 22, 2007, the event raised a record-breaking $15.3 million. The program aired from the Hollywood studios of Los Angeles television station KCET and was broadcast in the United States, as well as internationally.

The 2004 Asian tsunami also led to telethons being held in countries such as Canada (CTV and Omni Television), United States (NBC) and Australia (a joint telecast between the Seven Network, Nine Network and Network Ten).

In 2014, TWiT.tv held an online telethon entitled "24 Hours of 2015" celebrating New Year in every time zone to raise money for UNICEF. Founder and host Leo Laporte streamed live for much of the 24 hours, raising over $58,000.

== Other types ==
Similar to telethons, but considerably shorter, are nationally televised benefit concerts following major disasters such as the September 11, 2001 terror attacks, the Indian Ocean tsunami, Hurricane Katrina and the 2010 Haiti earthquake. These are generally three-time broadcasts meant to spur immediate humanitarian contributions, not part of the annual donation drives of the charities involved. Typically a phone number or website will appear on screen during the entire concert for donors to make pledges, though there may not necessarily be a live host announcing.
