= Yukino =

- Gender: Female

Origin
- Origin: Japanese
- Meaning: Different meanings depending on the kanji used

Yukino (written: 千乃, 雪乃, 由希乃 or ゆきの in hiragana) is a feminine Japanese given name. Notable people with the name include:

- Yukino Inamura (稲村 雪乃; born 2003), Japanese footballer
- Yukino Kikuma (菊間 千乃; born 1972), Japanese announcer
- Yukino Kishii (岸井 ゆきの; born 1992), Japanese actress
- Yukino Komori (小森 ゆきの; born 1996), Japanese idol and singer
- Yukino Matsumoto (松本 雪乃; born 1970), Japanese table tennis player
- Yukino Nakai (仲井 由希乃; born 1996), Japanese badminton player
- Yukino Shirai (白井友紀乃; born 2000), Japanese actress and former member idol group SKE48

Fictional characters

- Yukino, a character from Dead or Alive Xtreme Venus Vacation
- Yukino Aguria, a character in Fairy Tail
- Yukino Kikukawa, a character from the My-HiME anime and manga series, and her My-Otome counterpart Yukino Chrysant
- Yukino Mayuzumi, a playable character from the first two games of Persona series
- Yukino Miyazawa, a character from the His and Her Circumstances anime and manga series.
- Yukino Sakurai, a character from Candy Boy
- Yukino Yukinoshita, one of the main characters from My Youth Romantic Comedy Is Wrong, as I Expected

Yukino (written: 雪乃) is also a Japanese surname. Notable people with the surname include:

- Sai Yukino (雪乃 紗衣; born 1982), a Japanese writer
- Satsuki Yukino (ゆきの さつき; born 1970), stage name of Yuki Inoue, a Japanese voice actress

Fictional characters with the surname

- Angelica Yukino (雪野 アンジェリカ), a supporting character in Go! Go! Loser Ranger!
- Yukari Yukino (雪野 百香里), the main heroine in The Garden of Words

Other

- Yukino Bijin, a Japanese Thoroughbred racehorse
