= Zuiikin' English =

Japanese television series

- The Zuiikin' Gals
- 英会話体操 Zuiikin' English
- Created by: N/A
- Presented by: N/A
- Starring: Maiko Miyazawa; Rei Saito; Takako Inayoshi
- Country of origin: Japan
- No. of seasons: 1
- No. of episodes: 24

Original release
- Network: Fuji Television
- Release: 1992

Zuiikin' English (Japanese: 英会話体操 Zuiikin’ English, Hepburn: Eikaiwa taisō Zuiikin Ingurisshu) is a Japanese television series originally aired in 1992 by Fuji Television. Eikaiwa, Taisō and Zuiikin mean "English conversation", "gymnastic exercises" and "voluntary muscles", respectively. The series combines English language lessons with gymnastic exercise programs. The series consists of 24 episodes.

== Background ==
In 1987, Fuji Television, call sign JOCX-TV, branded their late-night/early-morning slots collectively as JOCX-TV2 (meaning "alternative JOCX-TV") in an effort to market the traditionally unprofitable time slots and give opportunities to young creators to express their new ideas. The broadcaster produced numerous experimental programs on low budgets under this and follow-on brands until 1995. One such program tried to help viewers to fall asleep while another showed an actor reading out a well-known novel and nothing else. Zuiikin' English was born under these circumstances.

== Format ==
At the beginning of the show, Fernandez Verde, the host, explains his theory of language learning. He proclaims that different cultures use muscles in different proportions due to their customs. For example, in one episode he states Japanese people have stronger lower back muscles (from bowing and keeping a lower posture), and a different leg muscle structure (due to squatting for long periods of time). He claims that using those muscles while learning a language will create strong associations in one's mind and hasten learning.

Each segment starts with a sketch containing both Japanese and English-speaking actors. They act out scenarios such as discussing a movie, asking someone out on a date, or going to the hospital. When one of the Japanese characters is confused on what to say, the sketch pauses and an English phrase appropriate for the situation is introduced. After the phrase is introduced, the show's signature Zuiikin' Gals appear, and demonstrate a dance or exercise while chanting the English phrase. The phrases taught in the show are as follows:

- Are you serious about anyone?
- Basically, I agree with you.
- Call an ambulance please.
- Could I have your name card?
- Do you have plans for tomorrow?
- Don't make fun of me.
- Hasta la vista, baby.
- He gives his sincere regards.
- Here's to your lovely eyes.
- How dare you say such a thing to me!
- How far is it still?
- How many of these should I take?
- How much do you think it will cost?
- I am allergic to penicillin.
- I can't see eye to eye on that point.
- I can't stand the sight of you.
- I feel feverish and sluggish.
- I have a bad case of diarrhea.
- I think so, too.
- I want us to be more than just friends.
- I was robbed by two men.
- I will pick you up at your place.
- I work for a trading company.
- I'll get started on it immediately.
- I'm afraid I must be going.
- I'm by myself.
- I'm here for pleasure.
- I'm here on business.
- Is that so? Really? Are you sure?
- Is the taxi on its way?
- Is there anyone who speaks Japanese?
- It's in the middle of the fairway.
- It's your fault that this happened.
- Keep the change.
- Leave me alone!
- Let me off at the next corner.
- Let's go Dutch!
- Lovely golf weather today!
- Never mind.
- Please take the roundabout route to avoid the traffic jam.
- Spare me my life!
- Take anything you want.
- Thank you for inviting me tonight.
- That's par for the course.
- The climax scene really got to me.
- The earlier, the better.
- Unbelievable! It's amazing! We did it!
- What is the fastest way to get to a theater?
- What time will we arrive in Tokyo?
- Will my insurance cover today?
- Will you go out with me tomorrow?
- Would you like something cold to drink?
- You drive me crazy!
- You have a wonderful place.
- You look sensational in that dress.
- You must be tired from your long flight.

== Internet meme ==
The program was initially broadcast in the spring of 1992 and occupied an early-morning spot. But it was not until the broadcaster decided to rerun the series from November 2005 on their satellite channels that the program, and especially the Zuiikin' Gals, started to attract international attention as a meme, the English phrase "I have a bad case of diarrhea" receiving the most attention. The diarrhea clip uploaded on YouTube has been viewed more than 12.1 million times (as of March 2025). Clips from the show have been featured on radio and TV programs such as The Opie and Anthony Show, The Soup, Anderson Cooper 360, Upload with Shaquille O'Neal and The Tonight Show with Jay Leno in America, and Rude Tube and 8 out of 10 Cats in the UK.

The Zuiikin' Gals are Maiko Miyazawa (宮沢麻衣子), Reiko Saito (斎藤レイ子), and Takako Inayoshi (稻吉貴子), whose names are displayed at the beginning of each exercise. Inayoshi is still active in the entertainment business as an actress.
