= Fuji Broadcasting Center =

Headquarters of Fuji TV in Tokyo

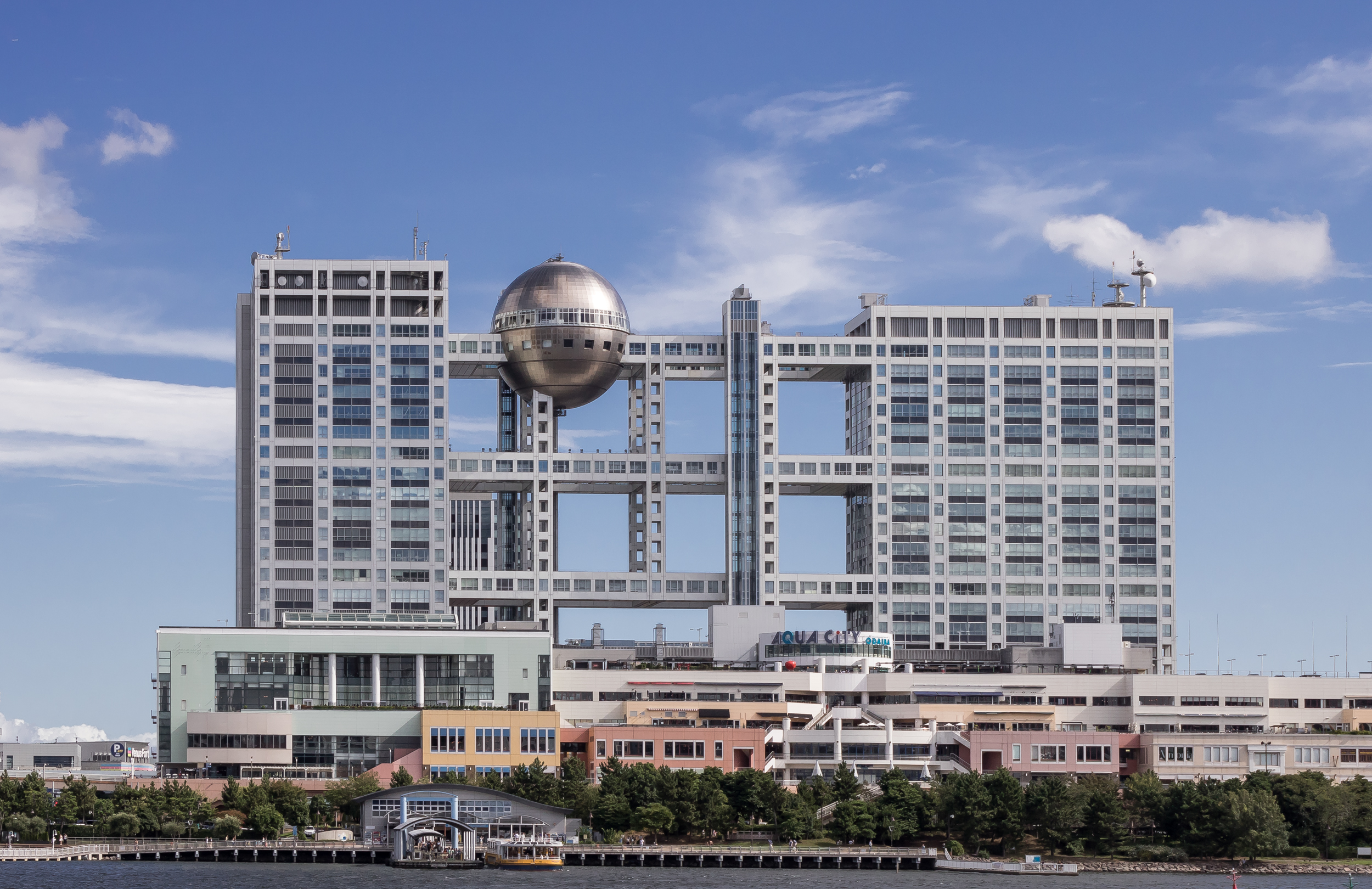

- Location within Tokyo Location within Japan

General information
- Status: Completed
- Type: Office building; observation deck
- Location: Metropolitan Expressway Bayshore Route; Odaiba, Minato, Tokyo
- Coordinates: 35°37′36.43″N 139°46′26.93″E
- Construction started: April 26, 1993; 33 years ago
- Completed: June 28, 1996; 30 years ago
- Owner: Fuji TV

Design and construction
- Architect: Kenzo Tange

The Fuji Broadcasting Center (also known as FCG Building) is a 27-story complex in Odaiba, Minato, Tokyo, serving as the headquarters of Fuji Television. It has a total height of 123.45 metres (405.0 ft).

== Description ==
The building was designed by architect Kenzo Tange from Tange Associates, and it was the last building directly led by him in a huge project. The building is a landmark that symbolizes Odaiba.

It is the largest building in the head office building of a Japanese broadcasting station, and has the largest studio floor area (991.7 km^{2}) as a Japanese private broadcasting station.

The structure consists of an office tower and a media tower connected by three enclosed footbridges. The exterior is cladded with salt-resistant titanium. Special care was taken with the acoustics for the building, including blocking radio waves. The Theatre mall is on the first floor, a rooftop garden is on the 7th floor, and Mezama Sky is on the 24th floor. The Hachitama Spherical Observation Room, located on the 25th floor, provides a view of Tokyo Metropolis. The sphere weighs 1,350 tons and its center of mass is off-center, which made its installation difficult.

== Studios ==
- V Studio 1 – The studio formerly housed morning news program Tokudane!.
- V Studio 2 –
- V Studio 3 – The studio was 4K compatible. It housed the programs which aired on BS Fuji.
- V Studio 4 – Located on the 3rd floor, it is the largest studio in the head office building (the largest studio floor area for Japanese commercial broadcasters). The studio housed many Fuji TV variety and entertainment programs.
- V Studio 5 – Located on the 3rd floor, the studio housed many Fuji TV variety shows.
- V Studio 6 –
- V Studio 7 –
- V Studio 8 – Located on the 9th floor of the media tower, the studio housed morning news program Mezamashi 8. When the V Studio 9, which is a news studio, cannot be used due to system updates, etc., this studio will be used as an alternative news studio.
- V Studio 9 – Located on the 12th floor of the media tower, the studio housed morning shows Mezamashi TV, as well as other Fuji TV news programs.
- V Studio 10 –
