= Getsuku =

Monday night time slot for popular Japanese TV dramas

Getsuku (月９, getsuku, sometimes further shortened to gekku) is a Japanese abbreviation for Getsuyō kuji (月曜９時; Monday at 9 pm). This is traditionally the time when the most popular TV dramas air in Japan.

== History ==
Fuji TV, one of the major broadcasting companies in Japan, started the pattern of airing the dramas it predicted would be most popular on Monday nights. Mondays are the only night in which generally no baseball games are played, meaning that throughout the year, there would be no delays in broadcasting (due to the popularity of baseball, some stations continue to broadcast games that extend beyond their expected finish time, thus delaying the start of subsequent programs).

While all of the stations often aired dramas on Monday nights, it was the popularity of the dramas Tokyo Love Story and The 101st Marriage Proposal that propelled the 9 pm slot on Mondays. Fuji TV started branding its 9 pm Monday shows as "Getsuku", and actors and actresses would be interviewed as starring in their first "getsuku". Not long after this branding began, the other stations also started showing their most popular dramas on Monday nights.
