= Children in Need Choir =

British children's choir

- Children's choir
- Origin: United Kingdom
- Founded: 2011
- Founder: BBC
- Genre: Variable
- Affiliation: Children in Need
- Associated groups: Variable

Since 2011 one of the recurring acts on the BBC telethon Children in Need has been a choir where usually over 1000 children come together in the studio and in around 8–10 locations across the UK and sing one song live in unison from the various locations. These choirs are created by the BBC local news regions using local schools and theatre groups and they usually sing from where the regional outside broadcast takes place.

The performance usually starts in the studio and cuts between to the different locations throughout the performance before ending in the studio (2022 and 2023 do not start in the studio) with a short 20–30 second instrumental break to show a montage of clips from the night's appeal films. However, since 2020 due to the COVID-19 pandemic the choir there have been fewer singers and the choirs across the UK have been pre-recorded with only the studio choir singing live.

== Earlier link-ups ==
The idea for nationwide link ups on Children in Need has been around since the early 1990s and started in the form of a jazz band performing from the regional events. However, in 1996, the link-ups started to move towards the current format when 500 children in 13 locations led by Gary Wilmot and a further 100 children in the studio performed the 1989 Children in Need single "If You Want To Help". This eventually grew to become the Children in Need choir that has been shown since 2011.

=== 1996 ===
In 1996 Gary Wilmot led 100 children in the studio and a further 500 across the UK performed "If You Want To Help" in unison. They performed from:

- London – BBC Television Centre
- Glasgow – The Broadcasting House – BBC Scotland
- Birmingham – BBC Pebble Mill – BBC West Midlands
- Chatham – Chatham Historic Dockyard – BBC London and The South East
- Manchester – The Arndale Centre – BBC North West
- Bournemouth – Bournemouth International Centre – BBC South (Labelled on screen as Southampton)
- Sheffield – Ponds Forge Leisure Centre - BBC North (Labelled on screen as Leeds)
- Newquay – The Towan Beach – BBC South West (Labelled on screen as Plymouth)
- Norwich – BBC St Catherine's Close – BBC East
- Gateshead – The MetroCentre – BBC North East and Cumbria (Labelled on screen as Newcastle)
- Bristol – Broadcasting House BBC West
- Leicester – The Grand Hotel - BBC East Midlands (Labelled on screen as Nottingham)
- Cardiff – The Broadcasting House – BBC Wales
- Belfast – BBC Blackstaff House – BBC Northern Ireland

=== 1997 ===
In 1997 Children in Need attempted to break the world record for the most people simultaneously line dancing which previously had stood at 1788. 5500 people from all the regions danced in unison to "5, 6, 7, 8" led by Steps themselves in the studio.

- London – BBC Television Centre
- Preston – Preston Guild Hall – BBC North West
- Gateshead – The MetroCentre – BBC North East and Cumbria
- Hull – BBC North
- Ayr – Ayr Town Hall – BBC Scotland
- Cardiff – The Broadcasting House – BBC Wales
- Carrickfergus – Carrickfergus Castle – BBC Northern Ireland
- Tonbridge – West Kent College – BBC London and The South East
- Cambridge – The Wimpole Estate – BBC East
- Birmingham – BBC Pebble Mill – BBC West Midlands
- Bournemouth – Bournemouth International Centre – BBC South
- Torquay – The Riviera Centre – BBC South West
- Swindon – The North Star BT House – BBC West
- Nottingham – BBC East Midlands

=== 1998 ===
In 1998 Children in Need paid tribute to Frank Sinatra after his death earlier that year. Music groups, choirs and singers performed "My Way" in unison from across the regions. They were led by Michael Ball in Belfast and the BBC National Orchestra of Wales in London

- London – BBC Television Centre
- Belfast – BBC Blackstaff House – BBC Northern Ireland
- Glasgow – The Broadcasting House – BBC Scotland
- Cardiff – The Broadcasting House – BBC Wales
- Basingstoke – Basingstoke Ice Rink – BBC South
- Birmingham – BBC Pebble Mill – BBC West Midlands
- Scarborough – The Corner Complex – BBC North
- Bristol – BBC West
- Sunderland – National Glass Centre – BBC North East and Cumbria (Labelled as County Durham as the group performing were Tudhoe Grange School from Spennymoor in County Durham)
- Thurrock – Lakeside Shopping Centre – BBC London and The South East
- Great Yarmouth – The Marina Centre – BBC East
- Manchester – The New Broadcasting House – BBC North West
- Tavistock – Tavistock Wharf – BBC South West
- Nottingham – BBC East Midlands

=== 2000 ===
In 2000 Children in Need performed a medley of Abba songs led by Martine McCutcheon in the studio. Acts ranging from school choirs to, local bands to Atomic Kitten performed snippets from the songs one after another to a live accompaniment from the BBC National Orchestra of Wales who were in the studio.

- London – BBC Television Centre – Martine McCutcheon and the BBC National Orchestra of Wales
- Manchester – The New Broadcasting House – BBC North West – The Rosebuds
- Birmingham – BBC Pebble Mill – BBC West Midlands – Bromsgrove Operatic Society
- Reading – Reading Concert Hall – BBC South – RASPO
- Leeds – West Yorkshire Playhouse – BBC North – SAAZ
- Glasgow – The Broadcasting House – BBC Scotland – Atomic Kitten
- Bristol – Broadcasting House - BBC West – Joey and The Lips
- Belfast – BBC Blackstaff House – BBC Northern Ireland – The Celtic Tenors
- Cornwall – The Eden Project – BBC South West – St Stythian's Male Voice Choir
- London – Old Spitalfields Market – BBC London and The South East – DAMAGE
- North Yorkshire – Richmond Castle – BBC North East and Cumbria – Richmond School Choir
- Norwich – BBC St Catherine's Close – BBC East – FABBA
- Swansea – BBC Wales – ABBA Gold and The Jacks
- Nottingham – National Ice Centre – BBC East Midlands – The Nottingham Schools Choir

=== 2001 ===
In 2001 S Club 7 performed the Children in Need Single "Have You Ever" accompanied by 3616 schools across the UK who sent in tapes of the chorus. Six live school choirs sang along representing them from the six regional concerts.

These were:

- Hamble School singing from the concert at Castle Field in Portsmouth – BBC South
- Longcroft School singing from the concert at the Dome Leisure Centre in Doncaster – BBC North
- Gwauncelyn Junior School sining from the concert at the Broadcasting House in Cardiff – BBC Wales
- Auchenback Primary School singing from the concert at the Broadcasting House in Glasgow – BBC Scotland
- The King John School singing from the concert at the De Montfort Hall in Leicester – BBC East Midlands
- Forge Integrated Primary School singing from the concert outside BBC Blackstaff House in Belfast – BBC Northern Ireland the link up on the night never went to their performance.

S Club Juniors performed in the studio in their first televised performance.

=== 2007 ===
Lee Mead performed "Any Dream Will Do" with choirs in eight locations across the UK live.

- London – BBC Television Centre
- BBC North West – Blackpool at The North Pier
- BBC Yorkshire and Lincolnshire – Lincoln at City Square
- BBC South – Basingstoke at the Milestones Museum
- BBC Northern Ireland – Belfast at The Stormont Estate
- BBC West Midlands – Birmingham at the Centenary Square
- BBC Scotland – Glasgow at BBC Pacific Quay
- BBC Wales – Cardiff at Broadcasting House with the choir in the link up on the set of Pobol y Cwm

== Children in Need Choirs ==
=== 2011 ===
In 2011, the Children in Need Choir started by Gareth Malone featured the contestants on The Big Performance Series 2. They sang "Keep Holding On" by Avril Lavigne. The choirs sang at:

- London at BBC Television Centre in the BBC London region
- Glasgow at BBC Pacific Quay for BBC Scotland
- Kent at Bluewater for BBC South East
- Weston-super-Mare at Grand Pier for BBC West
- Salford at MediaCityUK for BBC North West
- Cornwall at Eden Project for BBC South West
- Cardiff at Royal Welsh College of Music & Drama for BBC Wales
- Pudsey in the Leisure Centre car park for BBC Yorkshire
- Birmingham at Aston Hall for BBC West Midlands
- Belfast at W5 museum for BBC Northern Ireland
- Hull at Hull Truck Theatre for BBC Yorkshire and Lincolnshire
- Hampshire at The National Motor Museum for BBC South
- Colchester at Charter Hall for BBC East
- County Durham at Beamish Museum, County Durham for BBC North East and Cumbria
- Loughborough at Loughborough University for BBC East Midlands

Hull, Hampshire, Colchester, County Durham and Loughborough weren't included in the nationwide link up performance and were instead included in the highlights programme.

=== 2012 ===
In 2012, the choir was led by Aled Jones and featured over 2000 singers in 15 locations. They sang "Bridge over Troubled Water" by Simon and Garfunkel.

The choirs were singing at:

- London at BBC Television Centre in the BBC London region
- Aberdeen at The Beach Ballroom for BBC Scotland
- Northumberland at The Alnwick Garden for BBC North East and Cumbria
- Swindon at STEAM: Museum of the Great Western Railway for BBC West
- Birmingham at The Mailbox for BBC West Midlands
- Belfast at Broadcasting House for BBC Northern Ireland
- East Sussex at Glyndebourne for BBC South East
- Cardiff at BBC Hoddinott Hall for BBC Wales
- Scunthorpe at Baths Hall for BBC Yorkshire and Lincolnshire
- Winchester at INTECH for BBC South
- Cambridge at West Road Concert Hall, University of Cambridge for BBC East
- Exeter at The Forum, University of Exeter for BBC South West
- Leicestershire at Conkers Discovery Centre, National Forest for BBC East Midlands
- Rotherham at Magna Science Adventure Centre for BBC Yorkshire
- Salford at MediaCityUK for BBC North West

Cambridge, Exeter, Leicestershire, Rotherham and Salford weren't included in the nationwide link up performance and were instead included in the highlights programme.

=== 2013 ===
In 2013, the main studio moved to Elstree Studios in Borehamwood just outside of London, the performance featured only 10 choirs and 1624 children, instead of all of the events having choirs and some not being included it was decided those regions would just not have choirs and this idea had continued.

The choirs sang "Sing" from Elizabeth II's Diamond Jubilee Concert at:

- Elstree at Elstree Studios in the BBC London region
- Bath at The Roman Baths for BBC West
- Belfast at BBC Blackstaff House for BBC Northern Ireland
- Manchester at Z-Arts for BBC North West
- Falmouth at National Maritime Museum Cornwall for BBC South West
- Glasgow at BBC Pacific Quay for BBC Scotland
- Birmingham at The Library of Birmingham for BBC West Midlands
- Kettering at Wicksteed Park for BBC East
- Merthyr Tydfil at The college for BBC Wales
- Hexham at Hexham Trinity Methodist Church for BBC North East and Cumbria

=== 2014 ===
In 2014, the choir had a similar format to 2013 with 10 locations and 1685 and they sang "I'll Stand by You" by The Pretenders.

The choirs sang from:

- Elstree at Elstree Studios in the BBC London region
- Bradford at Bradford College for BBC Yorkshire
- Norwich at The Millennium Library at The Forum for BBC East
- Newport at The Newport Centre for BBC Wales
- Birmingham at Thinktank for BBC West Midlands
- Belfast at BBC Blackstaff House for BBC Northern Ireland
- Plymouth at Plymouth Life Centre for BBC South West
- Blackpool at Blackpool Tower Circus for BBC North West
- Chatham at Chatham Historic Dockyard for BBC South East
- Glasgow at BBC Pacific Quay for BBC Scotland

=== 2015 ===
In 2015, there were 1661 children in 10 locations and the choir sang "The Climb" by Miley Cyrus.

The choirs sang from:

- Elstree at Elstree Studios in the BBC London region
- Gloucester at Gloucester Cathedral for BBC West
- Belfast at BBC Blackstaff House for BBC Northern Ireland
- Keswick at The Rawnsley Centre for BBC North East and Cumbria
- Great Yarmouth at The Hippodrome for BBC East
- Llandudno at Venue Cymru for BBC Wales
- Jersey at Fort Regent for BBC South West
- Blackpool at Blackpool Tower Circus for BBC North West
- Glasgow at BBC Pacific Quay for BBC Scotland
- Arundel at Arundel Castle for BBC South

=== 2016 ===
In 2016, they had 1580 children in nine choirs and they sang "Lean on Me" by Bill Withers.

The Choirs sang at:

- Elstree at Elstree Studios in the BBC London region
- Liverpool at Sefton Park for BBC North West
- Swansea at Swansea University for BBC Wales
- Bridlington at Bridlington Spa for BBC Yorkshire and Lincolnshire
- Dudley at The Black Country Living Museum for BBC West Midlands
- Glasgow at BBC Pacific Quay for BBC Scotland
- Milton Keynes at Stadium MK for BBC East
- Salisbury at Salisbury Arts Centre for BBC South
- Belfast at Titanic for BBC Northern Ireland

=== 2017 ===
In 2017, there were 1788 children in 10 choirs and they sang "Over the Rainbow" by Judy Garland.

The choirs sang from:

- Elstree at Elstree Studios in the BBC London region
- Manchester at The Science and Industry Museum for BBC North West
- Bristol at Aerospace for BBC West
- Glasgow at BBC Pacific Quay for BBC Scotland
- Newcastle at The Discovery Museum for BBC North East and Cumbria
- Newbury at Brockhurst and Marlston House School for BBC South
- Belfast at The Ulster Folk and Transport Museum for BBC Northern Ireland
- Halifax at The Piece Hall for BBC Yorkshire
- Cardiff at The Broadcasting House for BBC Wales
- Nottingham at The Albert Hall for BBC East Midlands

=== 2018 ===
In 2018, the 1466 children in nine choirs sang "A Million Dreams" from The Greatest Showman.

The choirs sang from:

- Elstree at Elstree Studios in the BBC London region
- Southampton at King Edward VI School for BBC South
- St Ives at Tate for BBC South West
- Belfast at The Ulster Folk and Transport Museum for BBC Northern Ireland
- Chester at Storyhouse for BBC North West
- Lincoln at The New Theatre Royal for BBC Yorkshire and Lincolnshire
- Glasgow at BBC Pacific Quay for BBC Scotland
- Cardiff at The Broadcasting House for BBC Wales
- Wolverhampton at The Grand Theatre for BBC West Midlands

=== 2019 ===
In 2019, there were nine choirs and 1399 children and they sang "True Colours" by Cyndi Lauper.

The choirs sang from:

- Elstree at Elstree Studios in the BBC London region
- Hartlepool at The Town Hall Theatre for BBC North East and Cumbria
- Belfast at W5 museum for BBC Northern Ireland
- Maidstone at Allington Castle for BBC South East
- The Wirral at The Lady Lever Art Gallery for BBC North West
- Cardiff at The Broadcasting House for BBC Wales
- Mountsorrel at The Mountsorrel Memorial Centre for BBC East Midlands
- Larkhill at St Michael's CE Primary School for BBC West
- Glasgow at BBC Pacific Quay for BBC Scotland

=== 2020 ===
In 2020, due to the COVID-19 pandemic, the choir was altered to fit guidelines: choirs in each location were reduced to around 4–5 singers and it was pre-recorded, except for the studio choir, which had 12 members and were live on the night. Instead of an instrumental section, it went to a montage of all the choirs together before returning to showing the locations as usual. Instead of Museums or Theatres more of the locations were landmarks with their on screen labels being the landmark name instead of just the city/ town. It was also the last year to be in Elstree Studios. They sang "Fix You" by Coldplay.

The singers sang from:

- Elstree at Elstree Studios in the BBC London region
- The Brontë Parsonage, West Yorkshire for BBC Yorkshire
- The National Maritime Museum, Falmouth for BBC South West
- Pacific Quay, Glasgow for BBC Scotland
- Coventry Cathedral for BBC West Midlands
- Stonehenge, Wiltshire for BBC South
- The Harmonies of Hope Choir – A Choir of children who have had kidney transplants. The choir is funded by Children in Need and they sang from their homes across London and The South East and were edited together by the BBC Production Team.
- Ely Cathedral for BBC East
- Portmeirion for BBC Wales
- Cardiff Castle for BBC Wales
- Titanic Belfast for BBC Northern Ireland

=== 2021 ===
In 2021 the choir followed a similar format to 2020: most locations have 4–6 singers and 12 in the live studio choir. However, it did include the instrumental section. This was the first year to use Salford for the Main Studio. They sang "Rise Up" by Andra Day. The on-screen name labels followed the same format as 2020.

The singers sang at:

- MediaCityUK, Salford in the BBC North West region
- Stirling Castle for BBC Scotland
- Scarborough Spa for BBC Yorkshire
- Housesteads, Hadrian's Wall for BBC North East and Cumbria
- Smeaton's Tower, Plymouth for BBC South West
- Mumbles Pier for BBC Wales
- The Abbey Pumping Station in Leicester for BBC East Midlands
- Beaumaris Castle for BBC Wales
- The Vision Signing Choir, a signing choir based in Kent signed the song from their homes and were edited together by the Production Team for BBC South East
- The Cutty Sark, London for BBC London
- The Giant's Causeway for BBC Northern Ireland

=== 2022 ===
In 2022 the choir was again pre-recorded with the studio choir live. The number of singers was upped to around 20 per location and. This year was the first year not to start and end with the studio choir's performance instead starting with a montage of the children preparing for singing and all of the choirs were shown before the instrumental with only the Studio and a montage of all the choirs shown after. They sang "Somewhere Only We Know" by Keane.

The choirs were:

- Framlingham Castle, Suffolk for BBC East
- Aberystwyth at The National Library of Wales for BBC Wales
- The Laxey Wheel on The Isle of Man for BBC North West
- Bristol at Purdown Open Space for BBC West
- The Kelpies at Falkirk for BBC Scotland
- Hull Marina for BBC Yorkshire and Lincolnshire
- MediaCity UK in Salford in the BBC North West region
- Blists Hill Victorian Town in Telford for BBC West Midlands
- The Tropical Ravine in Belfast for BBC Northern Ireland

=== 2023 ===
The choirs sang from:

- Slough at The Old Horlicks Factory for BBC South
- Rotherham at Wentworth Woodhouse for BBC Yorkshire
- Salford at MediaCityUK in the BBC North West region
- Sunderland at Sunderland Museum and Winter Gardens for BBC North East and Cumbria
- Edinburgh at Port Edgar for BBC Scotland
- Cardiff from outside The Senedd building for BBC Wales
- Northampton at The Holy Sepulchre Church for BBC East
- Guernsey at Castle Cornet for BBC South West
- Antrim at Antrim Castle Gardens for BBC Northern Ireland

The studio choirs are made of children from the region they are in but created by the main studio team not the region's team.

=== 2024 ===
In 2024 the choirs sang "Never Forget" by Take That. This year saw the introduction of a new format. Instead of having choirs in various locations around the country they decided instead to invite 19 children from each of the 15 BBC Regions who have been helped by Children in Need projects. They were joined onstage by other children from the Hallé Youth Choir.

=== 2025 ===
In 2025 the format was the same as 2024. 16 children, all of whom have been helped by Children in Need, representing the 15 BBC regions were joined on stage by Salford Cathedral Children’s Choir to sing "Yellow" by Coldplay.

=== 2026 ===
In 2026, in the post 2024 format 15 children, all of whom have been helped by Children in Need, representing the 15 BBC regions were joined on stage by The Hallé Children’s Choir to sing a medley of Stargazing by Myles Smith and You Got the Love.
