= FNS Day =

Special variety program

The FNS Day (FNSの日) is a multi-hour long special variety program that has been produced and broadcast live every year since 1987 by Fuji Television and other Fuji Network System (FNS) affiliate stations (excluding TV Oita) with one main concept theme each year. Since 1997, most programs have been called FNS 27 Hour Television (FNS27時間テレビ).

== History and concept ==
The program was first held in 1987 as a special program for Fuji Television's 30th anniversary. The basis of the program is a parody and antithesis of Nippon Television's telethon 24HOUR TELEVISION "LOVE SAVES THE EARTH", and it was planned as a live broadcast program that only performs comedy without charity. In some episodes, parodies of 24-Hour Television are held, such as long distance marathons and performers and staff wearing T-shirts with the same design.

Because it is not a charity event, the promotional poster for the first episode clearly stated, "This is not a charity", and Sanma Akashiya, Tamori, and others repeatedly warned people to be careful during the program, but some people misunderstood and brought their donations to Fuji TV. There was also an element of advertising for the event Yume Kojo held by Fuji Television at the time. Initially, it was planned to be a one-time special program, but the average viewer rating for the first broadcast was 19.9%, and the instantaneous maximum viewer rating was 38.1%. Since then, it has been planned and broadcast every year, with interruptions due to the effects of the pandemic.

It was scheduled to be broadcast in August 2020, but due to the effects of the pandemic, it was canceled for the first time in 34 years, and since then it has been postponed until 2022. In 2021 and 2022, as a replacement for this program, which has been canceled, the long-term special program FNS Laugh & Music - A Festival of Songs and Laughter was broadcast live for 2 consecutive nights for a total of 9 hours on August 28 and 29, 2021, and ``FNS Laugh & Music 2022 - A Festival of Songs and Laughter ~ was broadcast on September 10th and 11th, 2022. In addition, from August 22nd to 23rd, 2020, ``ABOUT 27H YOUTUBE LIVE was live-streamed on the UHB Hokkaido Bunka Broadcasting Unofficial Channel, a YouTube channel run by announcers from Hokkaido Cultural Broadcasting, one of the stations participating in this program.

In 2023, it was revived for the first time in four years with broadcast content based on Chidori no Oni Renchan. The entire broadcast was streamed in real time on TVer, making the first time in history for a commercial television station to broadcast real-time broadcasts for more than 24 hours.

After 2025, it will not be possible to secure sponsorship fees due to suspicions of sexual entertainment, and Koichi Minato proposed a project for FNS 27-hour TV from 2023 onwards, but due to Minato resigned as president, it will not be held for the time being.

=== Content ===
Unlike 24 Hour Television, there is no uniformity in the content broadcast each year, and plans are held based on base programs and main concept themes.

For example, in 2002 and 2003, the comedy elements were reduced from previous years, and the broadcasts focused on moving content. In a complete turnaround, from 2004, the program began broadcasting programs with strong comedy variety elements. From 2017 to 2019, content with strong educational elements will be broadcast. After a period of suspension, from 2023 onwards there will be a return to content with a strong comedy variety element, and there are large variations in broadcast content and planning from year to year, with the programs of the previous year and this year often being essentially completely different.

There will be special editions of regular programs based on each year's theme, as well as corners containing programs from each time slot. Basically, it is a live broadcast (mainly recorded broadcast from 2017 to 2018. In other years, pre-recorded content may be broadcast at some time slots), and on rare occasions, collaboration projects with programs from other stations are carried out by taking advantage of the characteristics of being a live broadcast. The main set will be set up in a large studio, from Studio 6 in the Kawatamachi building to Studio V4 in the FCG building in Daiba, and each corner will be located in separate studios within the head office, Wangan Studio, in front of the company's hallways and entrances, and inside the Odaiba Adventure King venue, which is currently being held.

Also, since the first episode, the credits provided during the program have always been special ones with animation effects added to the bottom of the screen and no reading. Until 1996 (10th edition), the word "provided" was written above the sponsor's name, but from 1997 (11th edition), only the sponsor's name was written, and from 2023 (37th edition), sponsor names were written in color, except for some companies. Regarding local sponsor slots, Fuji TV has the same specifications, and many other stations receive normal credit.

Broadcast decisions are usually officially announced by Fuji Television approximately 2–3 months before the broadcast date. However, depending on the year, before the official announcement, performers and staff who are scheduled to appear on the show may unofficially mention the next FNS Day in interviews with their own programs or magazines, and this may actually become public as "It has been decided that it will be broadcast this year as well". In addition, the broadcast decision for 2023 and 2024 was announced in February of those years, which is a much earlier development than usual.
