= Yukino Kikuma =

Japanese television announcer

Yukino Kikuma (菊間 千乃, Kikuma Yukino; born March 5, 1972) is a Japanese announcer for Fuji TV. She is from Tokyo. She studied in Great Britain.

== Accident ==
On September 2, 1998, while reporting for Mezamashi TV, Kikuma fell from a 5th story window while reporting on a device to help occupants escape in an emergency. The accident happened when she tried to demonstrate the use of the escape system designed to lower an occupant to the ground from a window. The device was improperly secured to the building and so failed, resulting in a fall from four stories onto padding placed on the ground as a safety precaution for her planned descent. Kikuma survived, sustaining an injury to her waist. It took her three months to fully recover.

After this accident, Fuji TV announcers instituted a policy of avoiding dangerous reports.

== Change of profession ==
Kikuma announced her retirement from Fuji TV in December 2007 to pursue studies in law, attending Omiya Law School. She passed the bar exam in 2010.
