= Fuji Television =

Japanese television station in Tokyo

Fuji Media Holdings, Inc.

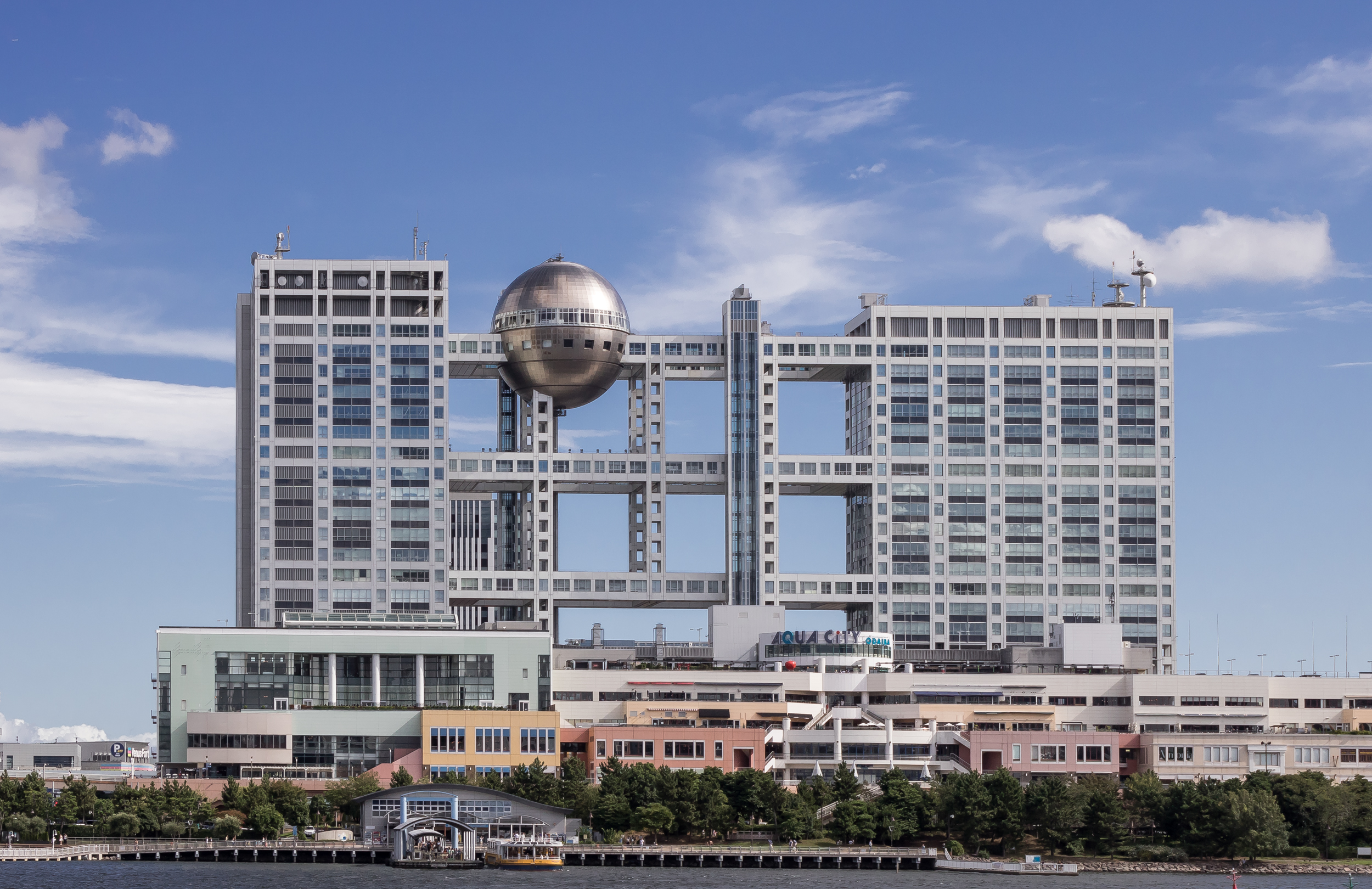
- Headquarters of Fuji Media Holdings and Fuji Television in Odaiba, Minato, Tokyo
- Native name: 株式会社フジ・メディア・ホールディングス
- Romanized name: Kabushiki gaisha Fuji Media Hōrudingusu
- Formerly: Fuji Television Network, Inc. (1957–2008)
- Type: Public
- Traded as: TYO: 4676
- Industry: Media
- Founded: November 18, 1957; 69 years ago (as Fuji Television Network, Inc.)
- Headquarters: 4–8, Daiba 2-chome, Minato, Tokyo, Japan
- Area served: Worldwide, with a focus in Japan
- Key people: Kenji Shimizu; (president and representative director)
- Products: Television; Film; Music
- Services: Broadcast television; Radio; OTT platform
- Operating income: ¥31,401 million (consolidated, March 31, 2023)
- Net income: ¥46,855 million (consolidated, March 31, 2023)
- Total assets: ¥848,769 million (consolidated, March 31, 2023)
- Owner: The Master Trust Bank of Japan (11.17%); Toho (8.24%); Custody Bank of Japan (4.46%); Nippon Cultural Broadcasting (3.46%); Kansai TV (2.73%); NTT Docomo (3.42%); Northern Trust (2.49%); State Street Bank and Trust Company (2.14%); Yakult Honsha (1.76%)
- Subsidiaries: Fuji Television Network; Nippon Broadcasting System; Fuji Satellite Broadcasting; Kyodo Television; Pony Canyon; Fujisankei Communications International; Fuji Creative Corporation; Fuji Consumer Products; Fuji Nextera Labo; Fusosha Publishing; Sendai Television (72.4%)
- Website: fujimediahd.co.jp

JOCX-DTV
- Logo used since 1986
- Kantō region; Japan
- City: Tokyo
- Channels: Digital: 21 (UHF); Virtual: 8
- Branding: Fuji Television

Programming
- Language: Japanese
- Affiliations: Fuji News Network and Fuji Network System

Ownership
- Owner: Fuji Television Network, Inc.

History
- First air date: March 1, 1959
- Former call signs: JOCX-TV (1959–2011)
- Former channel numbers: Analog: 8 (VHF, 1959–2011)
- Call sign meaning: C from Chūō (Central) Television, former provisional name

Technical information
- Licensing authority: MIC
- ERP: 68 kW
- Transmitter coordinates: 35°39′31″N 139°44′44″E

Links
- Website: www.fujitv.co.jp

Corporate information
- Native name: 株式会社フジテレビジョン
- Romanized name: Kabushiki-gaisha Fuji Terebijon
- Type: Subsidiary KK
- Industry: Media
- Founded: October 1, 2008; 18 years ago
- Headquarters: 4-8, Daiba Nichome, Minato, Tokyo, Japan
- Key people: Kenji Shimizu; (president)
- Services: Television broadcasting
- Parent: Fuji Media Holdings
- Subsidiaries: David Production
- Website: www.fujitv.com; www.fujitv.co.jp/company/

JOCX-DTV (channel 8), branded as Fuji Television (Note: Japanese: フジテレビジョン, Hepburn: Fuji Terebijon; also spelled as Fuji Terebi (フジテレビ)) or Fuji TV, is a Japanese television station that serves the Kantō region as the flagship station of the Fuji News Network (FNN) and the Fuji Network System (FNS). The station is owned-and-operated by Fuji Television Network, Inc. (Note: Japanese: 株式会社フジテレビジョン, Hepburn: Kabushiki gaisha Fuji Terebijon), itself a wholly-owned subsidiary of Fuji Media Holdings, Inc. (Note: Japanese: 株式会社フジ・メディア・ホールディングス, Hepburn: Kabushiki gaisha Fuji Media Hōrudingusu), a certified broadcasting holding company under the Japanese Broadcasting Act, and affiliated with the Fujisankei Communications Group. It is headquartered in the Fuji Broadcasting Center in Odaiba, Minato, Tokyo and is one of the five private broadcasters based in Tokyo.

Fuji Television also operates three premium television stations, known as "Fuji Television One" ("Fuji Television 739"—sports/variety, including all Tokyo Yakult Swallows home games), "Fuji Television Two" ("Fuji Television 721"—drama/anime, including all Saitama Seibu Lions home games), and "Fuji Television Next" ("Fuji Television CSHD"—live premium shows) (a.k.a. "Fuji Television OneTwoNext").

The current incarnation of Fuji Television was established in October 2008. Fuji Media Holdings is the former Fuji Television founded in 1957 renamed as a result of a restructuring. In the early days of Fuji TV's broadcasting, its ratings were in the middle of all Tokyo stations for quite some time. In the early 1980s, the ratings of Fuji TV rose sharply. In 1982, it won the "Triple Crown" in the ratings among the flagship stations for the first time, and produced many famous TV dramas and variety shows. In 1997, Fuji Television moved from Kawata-cho, Shinjuku District to Odaiba, the sub-center of Rinkai, Tokyo, which led to the development of the Odaiba area, which was almost empty at that time. After the 2010s, the ratings of Fuji TV dropped sharply, and now the household ratings rank fifth among all stations in Tokyo. But on the other hand, Fuji TV is also a TV station with more diversified operations in the Japanese TV industry and a higher proportion of income from departments outside the main business. In addition, Fuji TV is the first TV station in Japan to broadcast and produce locally-made animated series made specifically to be televised.

== History ==
=== Early stages ===
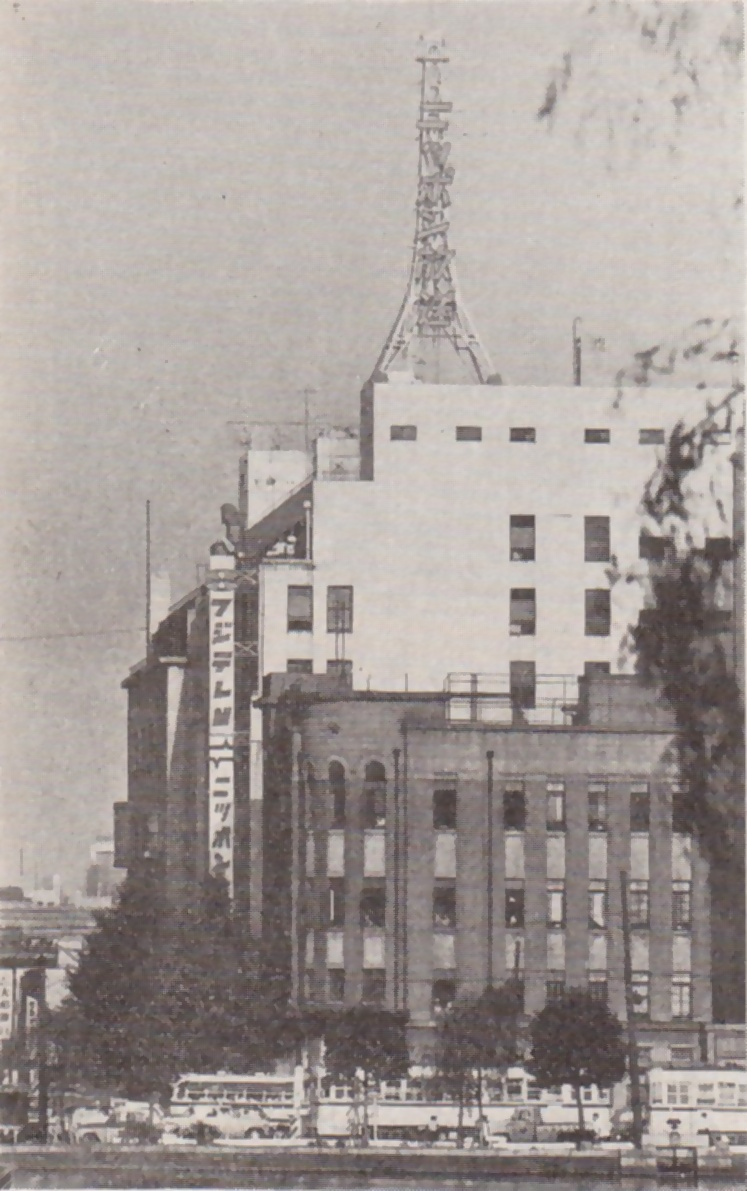
The first Fuji Television headquarters in Yūrakuchō, circa 1961 (also shared with Nippon Broadcasting System)

In 1957, the Ministry of Posts and Telecommunications issued the "Basic Guidelines for the Frequency Allocation Plan for Television Broadcasting", planning to set up three new television channels in the Yokohama area of Tokyo, of which only one station was a private general television station, and the other two were educational television stations (what would be the future NET TV and Tokyo 12 Channel). Around the general private station's build-up, fierce competition was launched from radio stations, film companies and other circles, including the two private radio stations in Tokyo at that time, Nippon Cultural Broadcasting (JOQR) and Nippon Broadcasting System (JOLF). Under the coordination of Nippon Cultural Broadcasting president Mizuno Shigeo, Nippon Cultural Broadcasting and Nippon Broadcasting agreed to integrate their applications and apply for a comprehensive TV station broadcasting license in the name of "Central Television" (Chūō Terebijon, 中央テレビジョン). Afterwards, Central Television merged with Toho's "Toyo Television Broadcasting" (東洋テレビジョン放送) and Shochiku's "Art Television" (芸術テレビジョン放送) to apply for a name change to Fuji Television (富士テレビジョン). On July 8, 1957, Fuji TV obtained the broadcasting license. After obtaining such, Fuji TV began broadcasting preparations and purchased nearly 2 hectares of land in Kawata-cho, Shinjuku District for the construction of the headquarters building, and at the same time carried out at the Sugar Industry Hall in Yurakucho Preparations for broadcasting (the building is also the headquarters of Japan Broadcasting Corporation). On November 28, 1958, because the Kanji character "Fuji" had many strokes and was difficult to display on the TV screen, Fuji Television decided to change the company name from the Kanji "富士" to the katakana "フジ".

Fuji Television Network Inc. was founded in 1957 by Nobutaka Shikanai and Shigeo Mizuno, presidents of Nippon Broadcasting System and Nippon Cultural Broadcasting respectively.

On January 10, 1959, Fuji TV began a trial broadcast. On February 28 of the same year, Fuji TV held the eve festival before the broadcast, and broadcast it live as a pilot program. On the next day, March 1, Fuji TV officially started broadcasting. One month after the launch, on April 10, Fuji TV participated in the broadcast of the wedding of Crown Prince Akihito (the future emperor) and Michiko Masada, and broadcast a special program that lasted 15 hours and 41 minutes. This wedding was also an important opportunity for television's popularity to skyrocket in Japan. At the beginning of the broadcast, because most old-style TVs could only receive channels up to channel 6, certain viewers were unable to watch Fuji TV (as it was on channel 8), which became its weakness. For this reason, Fuji TV actively negotiated with home appliance companies, enabling mass production of 12-channel VHF band receivers.

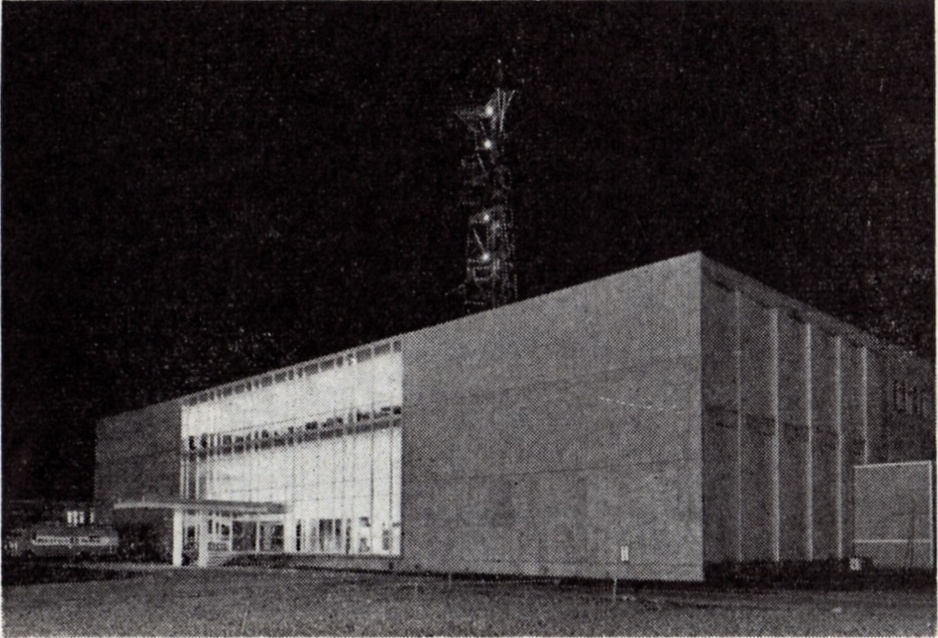
The second Fuji Television headquarters in Kawadacho, circa 1961

On June 23, 1959, Fuji TV signed a program exchange agreement with Kansai TV, Tokai TV and KBC Television. This was the beginning of Fuji TV starting to build its own network. One year after it started broadcasting, the ratings of Fuji TV have kept pace with those of Nippon TV and KRT TV (now TBS TV). In 1961, Fuji TV abolished the off-air period from 14:00 to 17:40, and extended the broadcast time from 6:30 to 23:40, becoming the first TV station in Japan to achieve all-day broadcasting except for the late-night period. Fuji TV also actively participated in the broadcast of the 1964 Summer Olympics. Since Fuji TV had a strong financial background during its establishment, there was no trade union for a long time. It was not until 1966 that Fuji TV established a labor union and proposed to abolish the 25-year-old retirement system for women. But it was not until 1972 that Fuji TV realized that both men and women retired at the age of 55.

In 1966, the Fuji News Network (FNN) was formally established, as the third national TV network, with Fuji-produced national news programming being aired to the network's affiliates in regional Japan. At that time, there were 6 affiliated TV stations. On April 1, 1969, 13 UHF TV stations were launched in various parts of Japan, 8 of which were affiliated to FNN (Out of the four UHF stations that started in 1968, two were FNN affiliates). In the same year, the Fuji Network System (FNS) was officially established, and at the end of 1969, the number of affiliated stations increased to 21. In addition to Japan, Fuji TV started actively expanding international cooperation. In 1960, it signed a cooperation agreement with the National Broadcasting Company; in 1970, the company also partnered with South Korea's Munhwa Broadcasting Corporation (MBC). in Taiwan, it helped set up Taiwan Television (TTV), and was one of its major shareholders until 2006, when the party, government and army withdrew from the media policy and demanded the withdrawal of foreign capital. In 1963, Fuji TV aired its first transoceanic satellite live broadcast, and the first satellite program broadcast was a special program on the assassination of John F. Kennedy. Fuji TV was one the Japanese counterparts of the Big Three commercial TV stations at that time during the 1960s. In 1967, Fuji TV opened its first overseas base in New York.

=== Entering the age of color television ===
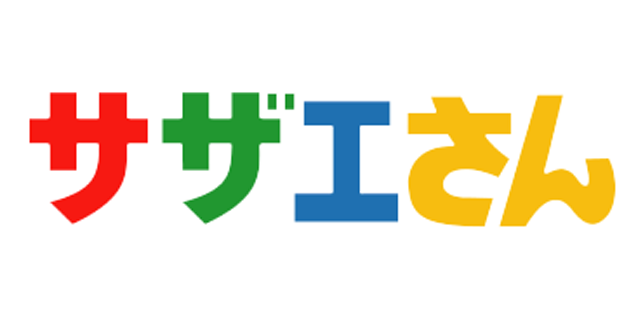
Sazae-san, which has been broadcast since 1969, is a national sensation in Japan.

In September 1964, Fuji TV broadcast a color TV program for the first time. This was the Gerry Anderson series Stingray produced by ITC Entertainment in the UK, and in turn the first British sci-fi series to be filmed in color. On February 11, 1967, Fuji TV broadcast the first color program "Guess it!" produced in the company's studio. This year, with the realization of the colorization of studio 7, the color programs of Fuji TV began to increase significantly, and signature programs such as "Arabian Nights" and "Shionogi MUSIC FAIR" also began to be broadcast in color. In 1968, Fuji TV broadcast the first color series "Small Love and Romance". In 1969, Fuji TV broadcast the moment of Apollo 11's landing on the Moon in color, and broadcast a special program of 23 hours and 20 minutes. In 1970, the news studio of Fuji TV had also converted to color. Fuji TV's technological innovations also expanded to other fields in the 1970s. In October 1978, Fuji TV started broadcasting in stereo.

In January 1968, Fuji TV, Sankei Shimbun, Nippon Broadcasting, and Nippon Cultural Broadcasting and their related subsidiaries formally established Fuji Sankei Group to strengthen cooperation among companies within the group, and Fuji TV also became a member of the group. One of the core enterprises. In 1969, Fuji TV celebrated its 10th anniversary. For this reason, Fuji TV broadcast a series of special programs from February 24 to March 2 of this year, and won the first place in the ratings this week. Fuji TV's network continued to expand in the 1960s. In April 1970, FNS joined Delta 27, becoming one of the largest private TV networks in Japan. At the same time, in order to reduce program production costs and cope with the growing strength of labor unions, Fuji TV decided on the policy of "separation of production and broadcasting" in September 1970, and transferred the program production department to several subordinate production companies. However, this measure did not bring success in ratings, forcing Fuji TV to abolish this system in 1980.

Before the early 1970s, except for Tokyo Channel 12, which was converted into a generalist TV station at the latest, the ratings pattern at that time was described as three strong (TBS, Nippon TV, Fuji TV) and one weak (NET TV). However, after the mid-1970s, as the ratings of TBS and Nippon TV rose, Fuji TV fell into a slump in ratings, and the competition in the TV industry became two strong (TBS, Nippon TV) and two weak (Fuji TV, NET TV). For this reason, Fuji Television carried out a thorough budget cut in the late 1970s. On the other hand, in addition to the main business of TV, Fuji TV began to diversify its operations during this period, and gradually increased its involvement in fields. In 1974, as part of the commemorative activities for its 15th anniversary, Fuji TV became one of the organizers of the Mona Lisa Japan Exhibition, which attracted more than 1.5 million people to visit.

=== Triple Crown and golden ages ===
Nobutaka Shikanai, first chairman of Fuji Television, resigned in 1980. Haruo Kauchi at Fuji Television's stand has completed a series of large-scale reforms. Haruo Kanai's return to Fuji Television Station's caused Fuji TV to enter a paradigm shift, changing its slogan from the hardline conservative "Mother and Child's Fuji Television" (母とこどものフジテレビ) to "It's not TV if it's not fun" (楽しくなければテレビじゃない). In 1981, Fuji Television had programming readjustments to match the new policies. Among them were the ending of celebrity interview program Star's 1001 Nights and a reorganization of the late afternoon schedule. In the first week of July 1981, Fuji TV surpassed TBS's viewing rate, enabling the channel to win the Triple Crown in ratings for the first time. In 1982, Fuji Television Station acquired the first core station, and broke through TBS's 1963 start maintenance record. Fuji TV was also the top channel for advertisers in this period. From April to September 1982, Fuji Television Station ranked number 1 in business acquisition at the flagship stations. Investigated by Video Research, TBS, which exceeds the quality of Fuji Television, climbs to the top of each television station in Japan, and is displayed on Fuji Television Station. In terms of technology, Fuji Television Station started research on high-definition television technology in 1987.

On April 1, 1986, Fuji Television changed their corporate logo from the old "Channel 8" logo, to the "Eye" logo used by the Fujisankei Communications Group. In 1986 and 1987, Fuji Television worked with Nintendo to create two games called All Night Nippon Super Mario Bros. and Yume Kojo: Doki Doki Panic for the Famicom. All Night Nippon Super Mario Bros. was a retooled version of Super Mario Bros. with some minor changes, such as normal levels being replaced with levels from Super Mario Bros.: The Lost Levels and some enemies being replaced with Japanese celebrities with comedic effect. Yume Kojo: Doki Doki Panic later became the basis for Super Mario Bros. 2, which was subsequently released a year later.

In October 1987, Fuji Television began branding their late-night/early-morning slots collectively as JOCX-TV2 (meaning "alternative JOCX-TV") in an effort to market the traditionally unprofitable time slots and give opportunities to young creators to express their new ideas. JOCX-TV2 featured numerous experimental programs on low budgets under this and follow-on brands, a notable example being Zuiikin' English which first aired in spring 1992. The JOCX-TV2 branding itself was changed in October 1989 to JOCX-TV+, which lasted until September 1991, when it was replaced with GARDEN/JOCX-MIDNIGHT in October 1991. Meanwhile, Fuji Television helped produce only the third series of the British children's television programme Thomas the Tank Engine & Friends (now called Thomas & Friends) with its creator and producer Britt Allcroft. The GARDEN/JOCX-MIDNIGHT branding lasted until September 1992 when it was replaced with the JUNGLE branding, which lasted from October 1992 to September 1993. The JOCX-MIDNIGHT branding was introduced in October 1993 to replace the previous JUNGLE branding, and lasted until March 1996 when Fuji Television decided to stop branding their late-night/early-morning slots.

In 1988, Haruo Kauchi died due to acute liver dysfunction, and Nobutaka Kauchi's son-in-law Hiroaki Kauchi assumed the post of chairman of Fuji Television. In 1991, Hiroaki Kauchi decided to move the headquarters of Fuji TV from Kawada Town to the Odaiba area, which was still almost an empty space at the time, in order to adapt to the equipment needs of the digital TV and satellite TV era- However, on the other hand, Hiroaki Kauchi's solo production style was unsatisfactory inside, Hiroaki Kagami and Hisashi Hie had a relationship between the two, and the emergence of a split in the management of Fuji Television. Ehisa, a pro-Japanese group, was appointed to the board of directors of the Japanese newspaper company, which was held on July 21, 1992. The next day, Hiroaki Kanai left Nippon Broadcasting, Fuji Television, and the chairmanship of the company and the chairman of the Fuji Group. The underlying cause of the incident was also acquired by the 2005 Vitality Gate Trial. However, Fuji Television's high-rise was born inside, and Japan's bubble economy collapsed. At the same time, preparations have been made for the launch of sales in the area of Fuji Television, which was established in 1995.

On March 10, 1997, Fuji TV moved its headquarters from Kawadacho, Shinjuku to the Fujisankei Group Building (FCG Building) in Odaiba, Minato, designed by Kenzo Tange, and broadcast special programs for 7 consecutive nights to congratulate the move to the new headquarters. This year, Fuji TV's drama series received good ratings. On September 9, "The Virgin Road", "Under One Roof 2", "The Beach Boys" and "Love Generation" all achieved average ratings of more than 20%. Fuji TV also established a new "Wednesday Theater" this year, allowing dramas to be broadcast from Monday to Thursday evenings. On August 8 of the same year, Fuji TV stocks were listed on the Tokyo Stock Exchange, becoming the third flagship station to have its stocks listed after Nippon TV and TBS. It was also the first time that a main station's stock was listed after 37 years. In addition, in this year, with the launch of Sakuranbo TV and Kochi SunSun TV, Fuji TV's network was also announced to be completed. In April 1998, Fuji TV opened its official website.

In 2000, BS Fuji began broadcasting. Together with CS channel Fuji TV 721 (now Fuji TV ONE) launched in 1998 and Fuji TV 739 (now Fuji TV TWO) launched in 1999, Fuji TV officially entered the satellite TV field and realized a multi-channel structure. By 2002, the number of subscribers to pay channels Fuji TV 721 and Fuji TV 739 had reached 1 million. On December 1, 2003, Fuji TV began to broadcast digital TV signals. The following year, Fuji TV regained the triple crown of ratings from Nippon TV after 11 years. However, while the ratings are rising, the peculiar situation that the parent company of Fuji TV and Nippon Broadcasting Corporation is smaller than its subsidiary company (in 2003, Nippon Broadcasting Corporation held 34.1% of the shares of Fuji TV) has also made Fuji TV become the leader of securities investment funds such as Murakami Fund. The target of equity acquisition. Beginning in 2003, Fuji TV and securities investment funds launched a competition to purchase the equity of Japan Broadcasting Corporation, and eventually developed into the Livedoor turmoil in 2005.

Since 2002, Fuji Television has co-sponsored the Clarion Girl contest, held annually to select a representative for Clarion who will represent Clarion's car audio products in television and print advertising campaigns during the following year.

In 2005, Fuji Television began offering Fuji Television On Demand (shows streamable over the internet) to customers of the internet service provider Softbank BB/BBTV. In 2008, Fuji Television on Demand got its own website. By 2022, the service had over a million subscribers.

On April 1, 2006, Fuji Television split up the radio broadcasting and station license of Nippon Broadcasting System into a newly established company with the same name. The remaining of the old Nippon Broadcasting System was dissolved into Fuji Television. This resulted in the assets of Nippon Broadcasting System being transferred over to Fuji Television.

On October 1, 2008, Fuji Television restructured and became a certified broadcasting holding company "Fuji Media Holdings, Inc." (株式会社フジ・メディア・ホールディングス, Kabushiki gaisha Fuji Media Hōrudingusu) and the second incarnation of "Fuji Television Network Inc." took over the broadcasting business; this was the first time a Japanese commercial broadcaster restructured into a holding company with a wholly owned subsidiary taking over the station operations.

On July 24, 2011, Fuji Television ended its analog signal.

Fuji Television, which broadcasts Formula One in Japan since 1987, is the only media sponsor of a Formula One Grand Prix in the world. Fuji Television has also licensed numerous Formula One video games until 1996, due to change in arrangement of Formula One commercial rights after that season.

=== Decline and restructuring ===
In the 2010s, Fuji TV suffered from sluggish ratings. In 2011, Fuji TV's triple crown position in ratings was regained by Nippon Television, and was surpassed by TV Asahi the following year, with the ratings dropping to third place in the flagship stations. Poor ratings also affected business conditions. Fuji TV's advertising revenue has been declining year by year since 2005, and was surpassed by Nippon Television in 2014. It lost its first position in the core bureau's advertising revenue after 30 years. In 2015, Nippon Television's turnover also exceeded that of Fuji Television. In order to reverse this situation, Fuji TV promoted Chihiro Kameyama, who has produced many popular TV series, as president in 2013. After Kameyama took office as the president, he stopped broadcasting "It's not a big deal if you take the time to smile!" and other long-running programs, and implemented measures such as a large-scale personnel transfer of 1,000 people in an attempt to promote revitalization within the company. However, these measures did not reverse the sluggish ratings. During the New Year's Eve week from 2015 to 2016, for the first time, Fuji TV's evening prime-time ratings were lower than those of Tokyo TV, ranking last among the flagship stations.

In 2016, Fuji TV's evening prime time ratings were surpassed by TBS again, falling to fourth place in the flagship stations. However, Fuji TV's sluggish ratings are also due to the phenomenon of TV disengagement, which has led to a decline in overall TV ratings; real-time ratings have declined but the proportion of time-shifted ratings has increased. On the other hand, Fuji TV ranks second in ratings among the 13 to 49 age group, which is most valued by advertisers. Therefore, Fuji TV has invested more resources in program production for young audiences to improve advertising effects. Fuji TV is also actively investing in the development of new media fields, and FOD has become profitable.

Fuji Media Holdings is also trying to make up for the negative impact of the downturn in the television sector by developing sectors other than television. Fuji TV began broadcasting the evening programs of its terrestrial station simultaneously on the Internet from April 11, 2022. In July of the same year, Koichi Minato, who had been the producer of many high-rating programs, became president of Fuji TV, later signed a cooperation agreement with French media conglomerate Groupe M6 after the failed merger with Bouygues-owned TF1 Group in a following year. After taking office, he implemented a number of measures to strengthen the field of entertainment programs such as variety shows and dramas. One of them is to start broadcasting "Pokapoka" in 2023, and resumed the broadcast of live strip variety shows in the weekday noon time after nearly 9 years. Fuji Media Holdings announced that it had acquired the broadcasting rights of the Asian Games along with TBS Holdings, beginning with the Hangzhou 2022 event on its 65th anniversary.

On September 27, 2024, Fuji TV and Fuji Media Holdings announced the establishment of Fuji Consumer Products which would handle licensing and marketing for Chuggington and Gachapin & Mukku.

=== Sexual harassment scandal and aftermath ===
On January 27, 2025, President Koichi Minato and Chairman Shuji Kanoh announced their resignations, taking responsibility for the broadcaster's handling of sexual assault allegations against former presenter Masahiro Nakai. It was decided that Fuji Media Holdings (FMH) executive Kenji Shimizu would assume the presidency the following day, to deal with declining viewership ratings and company restructuring, following an emergency board meeting convened to address the situation. Shimizu, who came from the anime division, previously served as a producer for "Dragon Ball" and "Chibi Maruko-chan". His minimal involvement with the variety shows division, which caused the recent problems, was a key factor in his appointment as president.

On Fuji TV and FMH's regular board meeting on the 27, President Shimizu revealed February's revenue 90% loss due to companies stopping ads in response to the scandal, as well as the unknown outlook for the April program reorganization period. According to Fuji TV, as of January, 311 companies and organizations had their commercials replaced with public service announcements. President Shimizu responded to the press after the meeting. He announced the launch of the "Revitalization and Reform Project Headquarters". He apologized to all involved and said it was a mistake to continue having Nakai on. The Project's representatives announced the launch of a working group to prevent recurrence and reform the corporate culture, with six measures, already taken, including strengthening the effectiveness of the compliance system, imposing tougher penalties on compliance violations, harassment, and human rights violations, clarifying and thoroughly publicizing the scope of those who can use the reporting system, formulating guidelines for dining out and meetings, implementing education and training on human rights and compliance, and initiating "dialogue" as part of human rights due diligence.

FMH announced that Hisashi Hieda, General Counsel to the Board of Directors, resigned on February 27 as member of the Management Advisory Committee, which provides advice and recommendations on matters such as the appointment of directors. With directors' average age so high, including Hieda's (87), FMH President Osamu Kanemitsu informed on the planned change of the board of directors, reducing the number of directors and its age, and focusing on how to revamp the management system to restore trust.

==== Programming ====
In the middle of the scandal, on March 1, Fuji TV opened a YouTube channel specializing in documentaries, with an original project, "The Non-Fiction Stream", based on the Sunday documentary program "The Non-Fiction". Popular documentaries such as "Shirabete Mitara" (produced by Live News it!) and (Mezamashi TV's) "Kirabito!", to be included in the channel's content.

On March 3, 2025, Fuji TV announced its weekday 11 p.m. variety timeslot, originally set up in 1998, would be reduced from 40 to 30 minutes in April. It started as a 20-minute slot, later expanded to 30 minutes, then to 40-minutes in 2017, except for the Tuesday Kansai TV production timeslot. It has produced programs such as The Life of a Laughing Dog, Love Ride, Nep League among others. In addition, the Thursday midnight anime slot "Noitamina" will move to Fridays at 11:30 p.m. in April, with The Dinner Table Detective starting on April 4.

As of September 27, 2025, about 40% of the sponsors Fuji TV had in 2024 had returned, the latest being Suntory Holdings, Toyota, NTT Docomo, etc., which resumed in July. Meiji Yasuda and Nippon Life were expected by the end of September, beginning of October. All commercials were fully return by October coinciding with the Fall restructuring, including Bushiroad and Cygames for anime blocks.

== Branding ==
The first logo of Fuji TV was designed by Yusaku Kamekura. Its design concept comes from the station's channel "8", commonly known as the "8 Mark" (8マーク). After Fuji TV adopted the "eyeball logo" (described later) as a trademark, the 8 logo did not completely withdraw from use. For example, there is a sculpture of the 8 logo at the entrance of the FCG building; the program logo of the variety show "Grand Slam of Performing Arts" also uses the 8 logo.

In April 1985, in order to strengthen the unity of the group, the chairman of Fujisankei Group Haruo Kanai decided to formulate a new group unified trademark. On May 2, 1985, among the nine candidate logos, Fujisankei Group decided to choose the "eyeball logo" (目玉マーク) designed by illustrator Masaru Yoshida as the group trademark. The logo was made directly using Liquitex pigments. Beginning on April 1, 1986, the eyeball logo officially became the logo of the companies under the Fujisankei Group, including Fuji TV. Fuji Sankei Group decided to adopt the font proposed by Yuji Baba as the trademark font of Fuji TV. In order to increase the awareness of the logo, Fujisankei Group spent an equivalent of 4 billion yen in advertising costs and broadcast as many as 3,000 TV commercials.

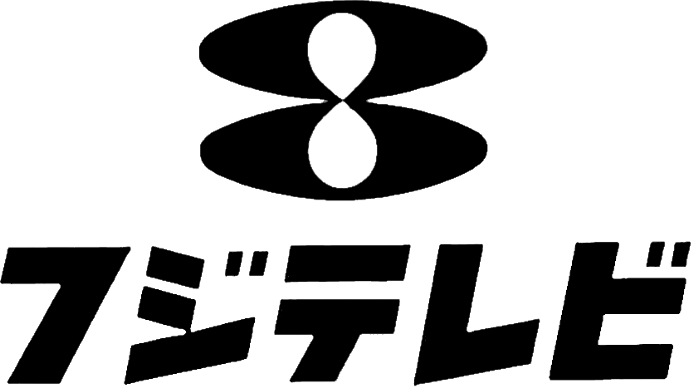
Former logo featuring the numeral 8 used from March 1, 1959, to March 31, 1986. A modified version of this logo is still used by Okinawa Television.

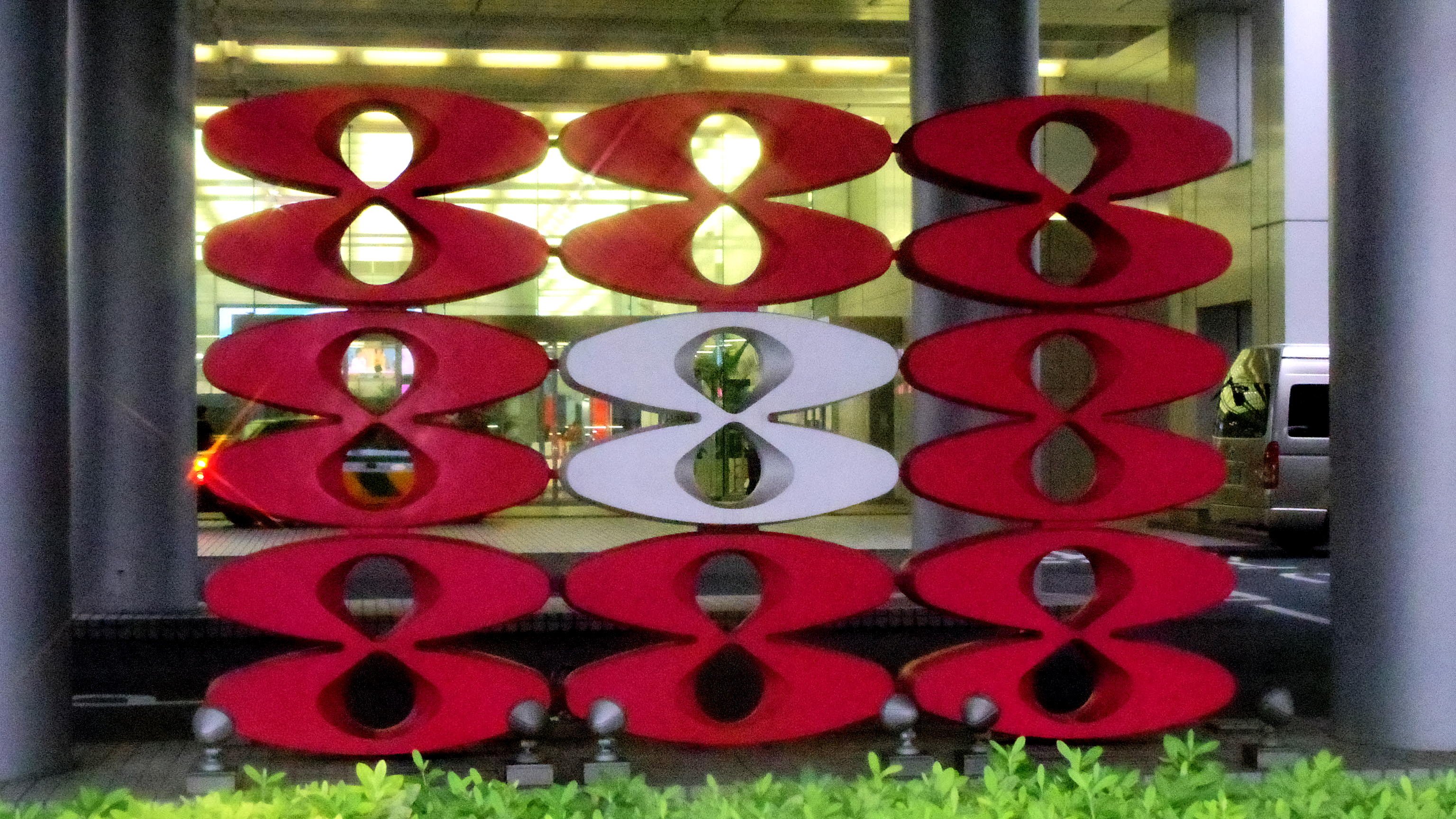
The "8 Mark" sculpture at the entrance of the FCG building

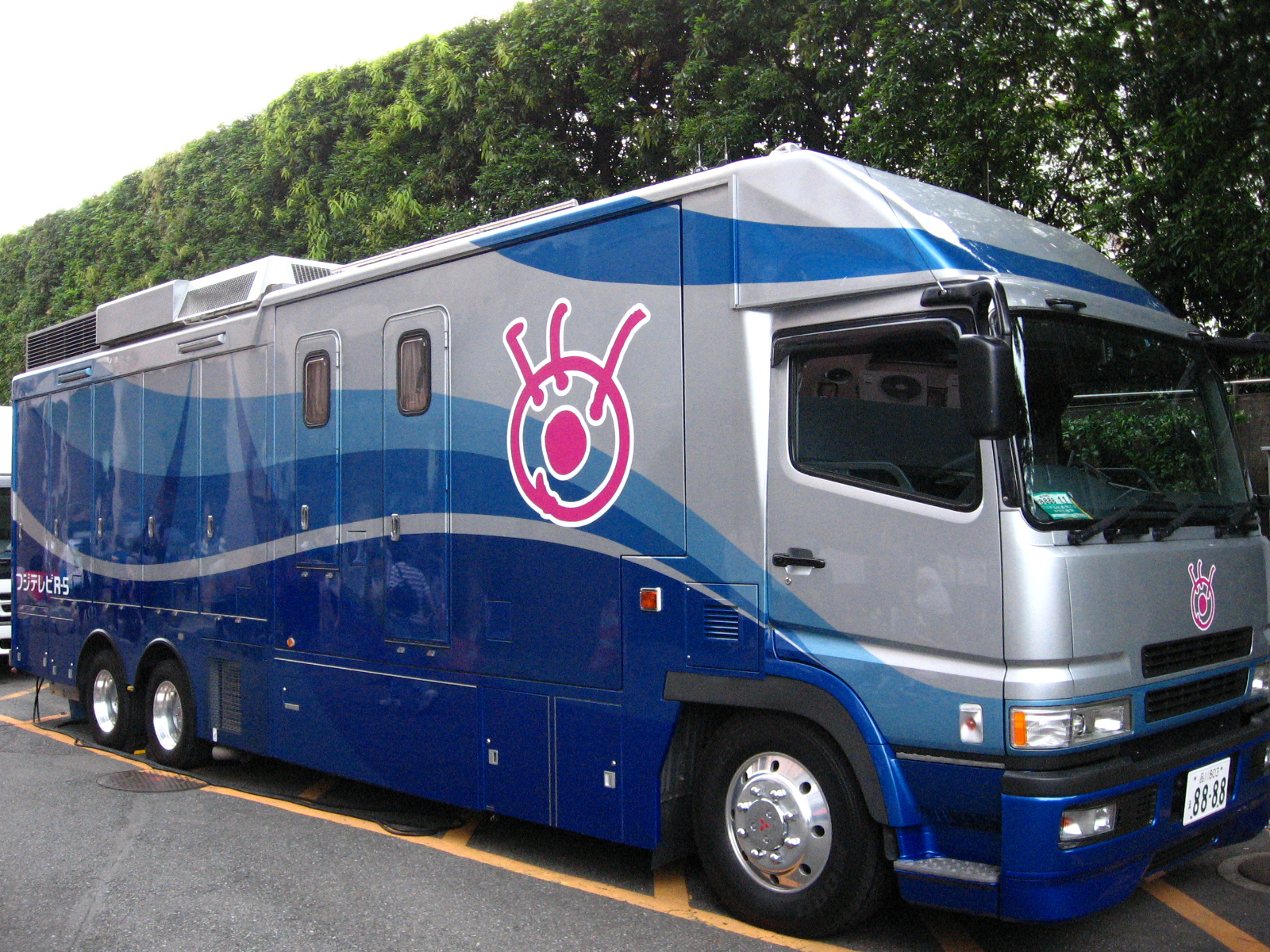
Fuji TV OB van with the eyeball logo colored in pink

== Networks ==
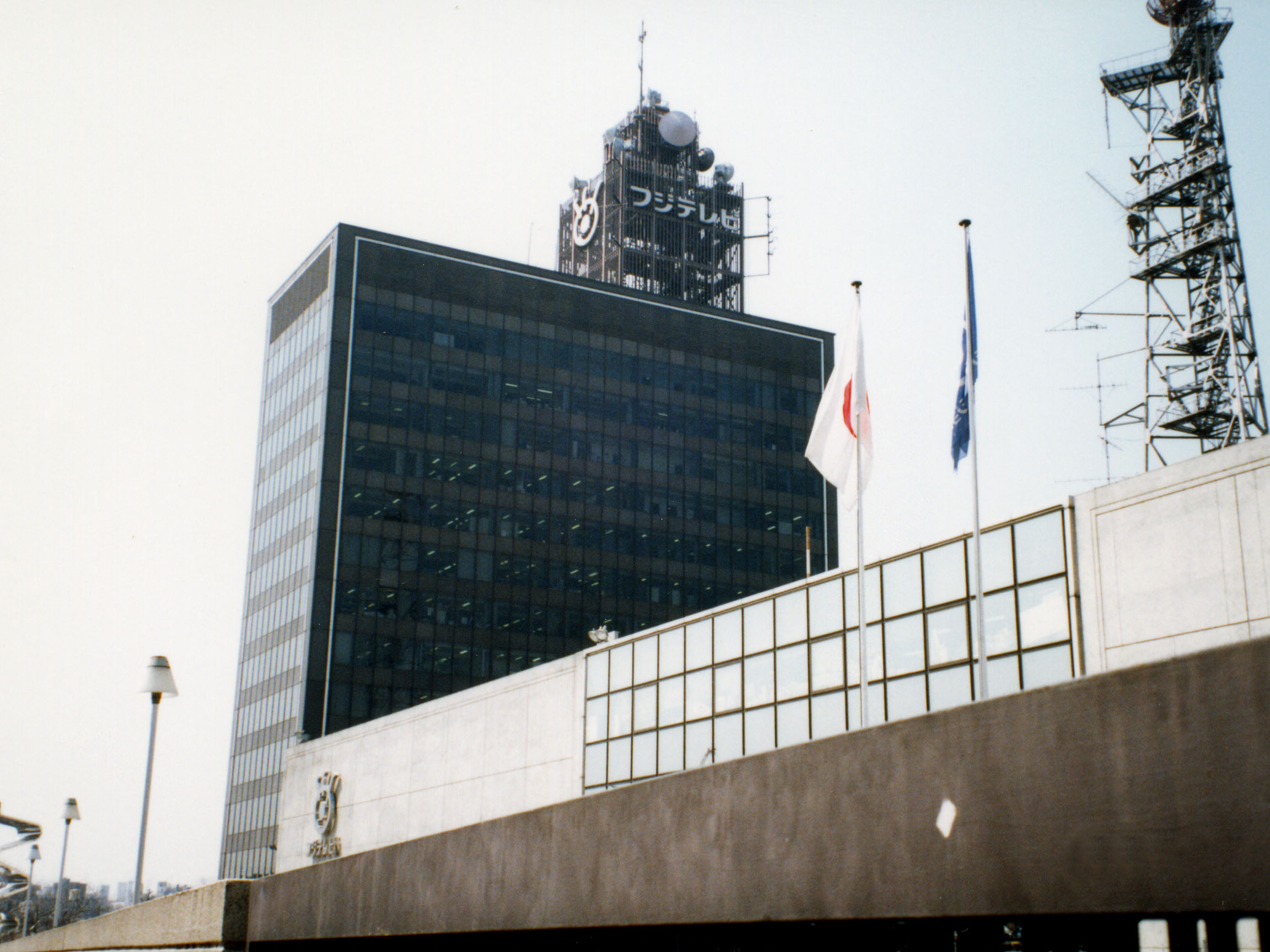
The second Fuji Television HQ in Kawadacho, Shinjuku (with addition of taller building), April 1991

Fuji Television's programming is seen nationwide on 28 full-time affiliates through the Fuji News Network for news content and the Fuji Network System for general programming. The latter is also responsible for the annual telethon, FNS Day: 27 Hours of TV, competing against the NNS-backed 24 Hour Television. In addition to these 28 stations, FNN/FNS is the primary affiliate of a three-network station in Miyazaki (TV Miyazaki) and the dual network has a secondary affiliate of a two-network station in Oita (Television Oita System), with the most share of programming. Up until the 90s, there were many other stations in this condition, but the arrival of new television stations led to an increase in full-time stations.

For satellite and subscription television, Fuji TV has total or partial control over the following channels;

- Directly managed by Fuji TV (Fuji TV One, Fuji TV Two, Fuji TV Next)
- Subsidiaries and affiliates of Fuji Media Holdings:
  - BS Fuji
  - Satellite Service (non-consolidated affiliate)
  - Nihon Eiga Broadcasting (30%)

== Streaming service ==
FOD (Fuji TV On Demand) is a video on demand, over-the-top, streaming television service owned by Fuji Television Network, Inc.

In 2005, Fuji Television launched Fuji TV On Demand in collaboration with broadband provider SoftBank BB Corp. and its streaming service BBTV. In 2008, it became the network's self-distribution OTT platform, becoming also available on mobile devices.

In 2015, Fuji Television entered into an agreement with Netflix to produce original content for the popular streaming service, with the productions distributed on Fuji TV On Demand after premiering on Netflix.

Fuji TV On Demand ("FOD") had over 1.5 million paid subscribers by August 2024.

== Programming ==
=== Anime ===
- Anohana: The Flower We Saw That Day
- Girls Bravo
- Moegaku 5
- Demon Slayer: Kimetsu no Yaiba
- Dragon Ball series
  - Dragon Ball
  - Dragon Ball Z
  - Dragon Ball GT
  - Dragon Ball Z Kai
  - Dragon Ball Super
  - Dragon Ball Daima
- Digimon series
  - Digimon Adventure
  - Digimon Adventure 02
  - Digimon Tamers
  - Digimon Frontier
  - Digimon Data Squad
  - Digimon Adventure (2020)
  - Digimon Ghost Game
  - Digimon Beatbreak
- One Piece
- YuYu Hakusho

=== Tokusatsu ===
- Mirrorman (1971–1972)
- Toei Fushigi Comedy Series (1981–1993)
- Megaloman (1979)
- Robot Detective K (1973)

=== Dramas ===
==== Japanese ====
- Long Vacation (ロングバケーション) (1996)
- Furuhata Ninzaburō (古畑任三郎)
- Bayside Shakedown (踊る大捜査線) (1997)
- Sōrito Yobanaide (総理と呼ばないで) (1997)
- With Love (1999)
- Hero (2001)
- Shiroi Kyotō (白い巨塔) (2003–2004)
- Water Boys (ウォーターボーイズ) (2003, 2004)
- Dr.Coto Shinryojo (Dr.コトー診療所) (2003, 2004)
- Densha Otoko (電車男) (2005)
- Umizaru Evolution (海猿) (2005)
- Oniyome Nikki (鬼嫁日記) (2005)
- 1 Litre of Tears (1リットルの涙) (2005, Tuesday 9:00 PM)
- Attention Please (アテンションプリーズ) (2006, Tuesday 9:00 PM)
- Kekkon Dekinai Otoko (結婚できない男) (2006)
- Nodame Cantabile (のだめカンタービレ) (2006)
- Proposal Daisakusen (プロポーズ大作戦) (2007, Monday 9:00 PM)
- Life (ライフ) (2007)
- Hanazakari no Kimitachi e Ikemen Paradise (花ざかりの君たちへ イケメン♂パラダイス) (2007)
- Galileo (ガリレオ) (2007, Monday 9:00 PM)
- Zettai Kareshi (2008)
- Fantastic Deer-man (鹿男あをによし, Shikaotoko Aoniyoshi) (2008)
- Last Friends (ラスト・フレンズ) (2008, Thursday 9:00 PM)
- Bara no nai Hanaya (薔薇のない花屋) (Winter 2008, Monday 9:00 PM)
- Change (チェンジ) (Spring 2008, Monday 9:00 PM)
- Homeroom on the Beachside (太陽と海の教室) (Summer 2008, Monday 9:00 PM)
- Innocent Love (イノセント・ラヴ) (Autumn 2008, Monday 9:00 PM)
- BOSS (2009, Thursday 9:00 PM)
- Voice (ヴォイス) (Winter 2009, Monday 9:00 PM)
- Konkatsu! (婚カツ！) (Spring 2009, Monday 9:00 PM)
- Buzzer Beat (Summer 2009, Monday 9:00 PM)
- Tokyo Dogs (東京DOGS) (Autumn 2009, Monday 9:00 PM)
- Priceless (あるわけねぇだろ,んなもん!) (Autumn 2012, Monday 9:00 PM)
- Beautiful Rain (ビューティフルレイン) (Summer 2012, Sunday 9:00 PM)
- The Case Files of Biblia Bookstore (ビブリア古書堂の事件手帖) (Winter 2013, Monday 9:00 PM)
- Galileo 2 (ガリレオ) (Spring 2013, Monday 9:00 PM)
- Summer Nude (サマーヌード) (Summer 2013, Monday 9:00 PM)
- Fight! Bookstore Girl (戦う！書店ガール, Spring 2015)
- Good Morning Call (autumn 2016) on Netflix and Fuji Television
- Maximum Level (最大 レベル, Saidai Reberu) (2025)

=== Cooking show ===
- Iron Chef (1993–1999, 2001 Special)
- Top Chef (international rights partner)
- Kuishinbo! Bansai (1974 - 2025) (currently suspended)

=== News and information ===
- Mezamashi TV (めざましテレビ; April 1994 – present) - Morning news program.
  - FNN TV Morning Edition (FNNテレビ朝刊; October 1966 – September 1975) - Morning news program.
  - FNN News 7:30 (FNNニュース7:30; October 1975 – March 1977) - Morning news program.
  - FNN TV Morning Edition (FNNテレビ朝刊; April 1977 – March 1982) - Morning news program.
  - FNN Morning Wide: News & Sports (FNNモーニングワイド ニュース&スポーツ; April 1982 – March 1986) - Morning news program.
  - FNN Morning Call (FNNモーニングコール; April 1986 – March 1990) - Morning news program.
  - FNN Morning First Run! (FNN朝駆け第一報!; April 1990 – March 1991) - Morning news program.
  - FNN World Uplink (April 1991 – March 1993) - Morning news program.
  - FNN Good Morning! Sunrise (FNN おはよう!サンライズ; April 1993 – March 1994) - Morning news program.
- Sun! Shine (サン!シャイン; March 2025 – present) - Morning news program.
  - Hiroshi Ogawa's Show (小川宏ショー; May 1965 – March 1982) - Morning news program.
  - Good Morning! Nice Day (おはよう!ナイスデイ; April 1982 – March 1994) - Morning news program.
  - Nice Day (ナイスデイ; April 1994 – March 1999) - Morning news program.
  - Tokudane! (情報プレゼンター とくダネ!; April 1999 – March 2021) - Morning news program.
  - Mezamashi 8 (めざまし8; March 2021 – March 2025) - Morning news program.
- Live News days (April 2019 – present) - News program before noon.
  - Sankei Telenews FNN (FNNニュースレポート11:30; October 1966 – March 1982) - News program before noon.
  - FNN News 12:00 (FNNニュース12:00; October 1975 – March 1977) - News program before noon.
  - Sankei Telenews FNN (FNNニュースレポート11:30; April 1977 – March 1982) - News program before noon.
  - FNN News Report 11:30 (FNNニュースレポート11:30; April 1982 – September 1987) - News program before noon.
  - FNN Speak (FNNスピーク; October 1987 – March 2018) - News program before noon.
  - Prime News Days (April 2018 – March 2019) - News program before noon.
- Live News it! (April 2019 – present) - Evening news program.
  - FNN News (FNNニュース; October 1966 – October 1970) - Evening news program.
  - FNN News 6:30 (FNNニュース6:30; October 1970 – September 1978) - Evening news program.
  - FNN News Report 6:00/6:30 (ニュースレポート6:00/6:30; October 1978 – March 1984) - Evening news program.
  - FNN Super Time (FNNスーパータイム; October 1984 – March 1997) - Evening news program.
  - FNN News555 The human (FNNニュース555 ザ・ヒューマン; April 1997 – March 1998) - Evening news program.
  - FNN Supernews (FNNスーパーニュース; April 1998 – March 2015) - Evening news program.
  - Minna No News (みんなのニュース; April 2015 – March 2018) - Evening news program.
  - Prime News Evening (プライムニュース イブニング; April 2018 – March 2019) - Evening news program.
- Live News α (April 2019 – present) - Night news program.
  - News Talk (ニュース対談; March 1959 – September 1965) - Night news program.
  - Today's News (きょうのニュース; October 1965 – March 1966) - Night news program.
  - This is News (こちら報道部; April 1966 – March 1968) - Night news program.
  - FNN News Final Edition (FNNニュース最終版; April 1968 – March 1977) - Night news program.
  - FNN News Report 23:00 (FNNニュースレポート23:00; April 1977 – March 1987) - Night news program.
  - FNN News Factory (FNNニュース工場; April – September 1987) - Night news program.
  - FNN Date Line (October 1987 – March 1990) - Night news program.
  - FNN Newscom (April 1990 – March 1994) - Night news program.
  - News Japan (ニュースJAPAN; April 1994 – March 2015) - Night news program.
  - Ashita No News (あしたのニュース; April 2015 – March 2016) - Night news program.
  - You're Time 〜Anata No Jikan〜 (ユアタイム〜あなたの時間〜; April 2016 – September 2017) - Night news program.
  - The News α (October 2017 – March 2018) - Night news program.
  - Prime News α (April 2018 – March 2019) - Night news program.
- Kids News - Weekly children's news program
- Mr. Sunday (2010- ) (co-produced by Kansai Television), extended to 2 hrs. in 2025
- Sun! Shine (サン!シャイン) (2025- )

=== Variety shows ===
- IQ Sapuri (脳内エステ IQサプリ) - end
- Toribia no Izumi (トリビアの泉) (Spike TV produced an American version of Hey! Spring of Trivia.)
- The Gaman
- Flyer TV
- Zuiikin' English
- Mecha-Mecha Iketeru!
- Waratte Iitomo! (森田一義アワー 笑っていいとも!) (October 1982 – March 2014)
- Dōmoto kyōdai (2001–2004), renamed Shin Dōmoto kyōdai (2004 - 2014)
- a-nation 2012
- Machi gurume o maji tansaku! Kamai machi
- Odo Odo × Harahara
- Itadaki High JUMP (2015–2024)
- Kinki Kids Bun Bun Bun (2014–2024)
- TokiTabi (October 2023 – March 2024)
- Super Eight no Gojiyuni (February 2024 – March 2024)
- All Night Fuji (1983–1991)
  - All Night Fujiko (April 2023-March 2025) Cancelled as part of the restructure of the network after the Fuji TV - Masahiro Nakai Scandal. An advertising agency official pointed out: "It was a program that could not wipe off the image of 'former Fuji'", as it was considered to be a "key project" for former president Koichi Minato, who was director of its predecessor,"All Night Fuji".
- Chidori no Oni Renchan (2022- ) (from 1 hr. to 2 hrs. in 2025)
- One Night Study (2025– )

=== Music shows ===
- Hey! Hey! Hey! Music Champ (October 1994 – December 2012)
- Music Fair (1964- )
- FNS Music Festival (1974–2024) (further editions pending)
- Idoling!!! (2006–2015)
- Johnny's Countdown Live (ジャニーズカウントダウンライブ) (December 31, 1996 – December 31, 2022, ended due to the Johnny's scandal.)
- Music Generation

=== Talk shows ===
- Dareka to Nakai (February 4, 2024) (originally "Matsumoto Nakai"—which aired from April 30, 2023, with two specials aired in 2020 and 2022—renamed after co-host Hitoshi Matsumoto was suspended due to sexual assault accusations in several magazines) After a series of co-hosts, the program was suspended in January 2025 following Masahiro Nakai's sexual assault accusations. Japanese media have reported the show's official end in March 2025.

=== Reality television ===
- Ainori (あいのり; October 11, 1999 – March 23, 2009) – Dating program that takes place on a pink van traveling the world.
- VivaVivaV6 (April 2001 – present)
- Magic Revolution (2004–present)
- Game Center CX (2003–present)

=== Game shows ===
- Brain Wall (Hole in the Wall in United States)
- Quiz $ Millionaire (Japanese version of Who Wants to Be a Millionaire?; April 2000 – March 2007, New Year's Special 2013, 2026)
- The Weakest Link (April – September 2002)
- Run for money: Tōsō-chū (Japanese: run for money 逃走中, June 2004 – Current) The show plays out as a large-scale game of tag held in a city, theme park, or shopping center rented out by the program in which at the start of each game, contestants (known as Fugitives) are set loose to roam in a set playing area, and must remain inside the area for the duration of the game. The show then releases "Hunters" into the area, paid agents whose sole goal is to chase down and tag the contestants. If a player is tagged by a Hunter, they are eliminated from the game. Its popularity gave rise to both an American and a Chinese version of the show along with its own multimedia franchise including board games, a PSP game Machi-Ing Maker 3 x Tousouchuu in 2010, two 3DS games Run for Money Tousouchuu (Run For Money) in 2012 and Chou Tousouchuu Atsumare Saikyou no Tousousya Tachi (Super Run For Money) in 2015 with both titles having been remastered and released as a bundle on November 29, 2018, for the Nintendo Switch, a stage play, novels, an anime titled Tousouchuu: Great Mission based on the show itself along with its own game also for the Switch released on July 4, 2024, and a feature-length film titled Run for Money the Movie: Tokyo Mission (逃走中 THE MOVIE:TOKYO MISSION) also based on the show as a commemoration to its 20th anniversary. It was produced by Toei Company and has since premiered on July 19, 2024.
- Vs. Arashi (April 2008 – 2020)
- VS Damashii (VS魂) (January 2021 – September 2023)
- Mokushichi marubatsubu (October 2023) Renamed Aiba marubatsubu, it was changed from a late afternoon Thursday 1 hour show to a Saturday afternoon 30 minute show in April 2024.

=== Sports coverage ===
==== Current ====
===== Football (Soccer) =====
- FIFA
  - National teams
    - Men's :
      - FIFA World Cup (including qualifiers for Europe (all matches) and Asia (selected matches))
- JFA
  - Japan national football team (World Cup and all Asian Cup qualifiers from first round, with exclusive coverage for all friendlies)
  - Japan national under-23 football team
  - Kirin Cup Soccer
- EAFF
  - EAFF E-1 Football Championship
- AFF–EAFF
  - AFF–EAFF Champions Trophy
- J.League
  - YBC Levain Cup
    - Women's :
  - FIFA Women's World Cup
  - Japan women's national football team (World Cup and Asian Cup all qualifiers from first round, with exclusive coverage for all friendlies)
  - Japan women's national under-23 football team
  - EAFF E-1 Football Championship (women)

===== Figure Skating =====
- World Figure Skating Championships

===== Baseball =====
- Nippon Professional Baseball

===== Volleyball =====
- FIVB Volleyball Men's World Cup
- FIVB Volleyball Women's World Cup
- FIVB Volleyball Men's Nations League
- FIVB Volleyball Women's Nations League

===== Boxing =====
- K-1

===== Judo =====
- World Judo Championships

===== Motorsport =====
- Formula One

===== Multi-sport events =====
- Asian Games
- Olympic Games (via Japan Consortium)
  - Summer Olympic Games
  - Winter Olympic Games
  - Youth Olympic Games

==== Former ====
===== Basketball =====
- FIBA
  - FIBA World Cup

===== Golf =====
- Fujisankei Classic

===== Horse-racing =====
- Japan Cup

===== Mixed martial arts =====
- Rizin Fighting Federation

===== Motorsport =====
- Super Formula Championship

===== Volleyball =====
- FIVB Volleyball World League

== Controversies ==
=== Anti-Korean sentiment ===
On August 7–21, 2011, more than 2,000 protesters from Japanese Culture Channel Sakura and other groups rallied in front of Fuji Television and Fuji Media Holdings' headquarters in Odaiba, Tokyo to demonstrate against what they perceived as the network's increased use of South Korean content, information manipulation and insulting treatment of Japanese people. Channel Sakura called Fuji Television the "Traitor Network" in these protests.

Further on June 29, 2015, Fuji Television apologized for running subtitles during a show earlier in the month that inaccurately described South Koreans interviewed on the street as saying they "hate" Japan. The apology came after a successful online petition over the weekend, with people stating the major broadcaster had fabricated the subtitles to breed anti-Korean sentiment amongst the Japanese public. Fuji TV explained that both interviewees indeed spoke of their dislike of Japan during the interviews, but it accidentally ran clips that did not contain that message. According to the broadcaster, "we aired these inaccurate clips because of a mix-up during the editing process as well as our failure to check the final footage sufficiently".

In 2016, a 32-year-old Fuji Television Police reporter was indicted after strawpurchasing an Audi sportscar on behalf of a Yamaguchigumi-affiliated yakuza member. The two had met over 20 times over a year, dining at restaurants in central Tokyo. In a statement, Fuji TV said: "It is undetermined whether the partner was part of an anti-social organization. We cannot comment on the details." The reporter was later fined 300,000 yen.

=== Baseball coverage ===
In early June 2024, as part of its Los Angeles Dodgers coverage, they, along with Nippon TV, gave very comprehensive coverage of Shohei Ohtani's Los Angeles home. The coverage was widely panned as an invasion of Ohtani's privacy largely due to the aerial views of the property as well as interviews with various neighbors. As a result, the Dodgers revoked the media credentials of the two networks. Both networks declined to respond to the situation. This also led to Ohtani selling his house and refusing a post-game interview with them after the Dodgers went on to win the World Series that year.

In October 2024, Fuji TV chose to cover the 2024 World Series in the US instead of the 2024 Japan Series, which was a huge event in its own right. This led to the Nippon Professional Baseball Organization stripping Fuji TV of press passes for the first two games of the 2024 Japan Series before it started on Oct. 26. However, for Television Nishinippon Corporation (TNC), a local Fukuoka TV station affiliated with Fuji Network System that would be covering the third game, its press passes were still granted, since it is considered as a separate company from Fuji Television, but the words "Fuji Television" in the space indicating the affiliation in the passes were blacked out with a marker.

On June 11, 2025, the Japan Fair Trade Commission warned the NPB over the decision, citing that the move could violate antimonopoly law, urging the NPB to prevent any recurrence.

=== Sexual harassment scandal ===
In January 2025, Fuji Television apologized over allegations that TV personality and former SMAP boy band member Masahiro Nakai had sexually assaulted a woman in her 20s in June 2023, and that a Fuji TV employee arranged for the dinner between the two. Fuji TV president Koichi Minato told reporters that the network denied involvement in the incident, but was aware of it and chose not to publicize the matter out of respect for the woman's privacy and recovery. He added that an investigative panel of lawyers would look into the issue. This came after the initial reports from Japanese tabloids including Shūkan Bunshun in December 2024, and a subsequent open letter from an affiliate of American activist fund Dalton Investments (a minority shareholder of Fuji Media Holdings) calling on an investigation and alleging that Fuji TV's handling of the Nakai matter exposed "serious flaws" in their corporate governance. The press conference was criticized for its closed nature, limiting the media that could attend and prohibiting live broadcasts and video recording. Dalton Investments sent a second letter on January 21, criticizing the closed press conference and demanding that a second, open press conference be held by the end of the week. Asahi Shimbun reported the next day that Fuji TV was planning to change the makeup of its investigative panel to one established under guidelines set by the Japan Federation of Bar Associations, after receiving criticism on its initial plans for a panel consisting of lawyers unrelated to the broadcaster. On January 23, 2025, Nakai announced his retirement from the entertainment industry.

In response to the Nakai incident there was a widespread movement among sponsors, including Nissan, Toyota, Kirin Holdings, Kao Corporation, Seven & I Holdings, Shiseido and Nintendo to withhold and suspend their commercials from Fuji TV. FMH's shares fell at least 13% as a consequence of the scandal. Additionally, Kikkoman asked Fuji TV to suspend airing the show which they sponsor, "Kuishinbo! Bansai", and Shionogi Healthcare decided to remove their name from the network's music show "Music Fair". Some companies considered refund negotiations and contract termination before the advertisement contract expired. The network aired commercials from AC Japan to fill in slots left out by companies that stopped advertising.

On January 17, 2025 Shūkan Bunshun, citing an unnamed Fuji TV announcer, reported that the Fuji TV staffer who allegedly arranged the 2023 dinner party with Nakai had arranged other similar parties for Nakai and Fuji TV.

On January 27, 2025, Fuji Television Network Inc. announced major leadership changes in response to the sexual harassment scandal involving Nakai. Koichi Minato, president of Fuji Television Network Inc., and Shuji Kanoh, chairman of parent company Fuji Media Holdings Inc., both resigned effective immediately. Kenji Shimizu was appointed as the new president, taking over on January 28. Fuji TV's press conference where they announced the changes, lasted over ten hours, ending at around 2:20 a.m. the following morning and hosted around 400 members of the press. Conspicuously absent from the press conference was Hisashi Hieda, former president and CEO of Fuji Television and Fuji Media Holdings, and current director and advisor of the company. According to the answers given to questions regarding his absence, Kano responded that the reason is "because he is an advisor" and that "the responsibility (for duties) is mine and Minato's". When asked if Hieda had made any statements to the effect that he would "take responsibility", he did not clarify, saying there was nothing in particular that could be said. Regarding if Hieda would resign, he answered that he was not directly involved, but "we need to consider the underlying causes as well".

During the press conference, several topics were talked about. About the case, it had been known since June 2023, when the woman talked about it to a Fuji employee. Due to the nature of the incident, it was reported to executives, officers, and eventually the president; only a few people in the company knew about it. Nakai himself reported the incident in July, and Fuji hesitated to take on the case, because an agreement between the parts had already taken place, and a settlement was proceeding. President Minato became aware until August. Since then, the woman was kept under watch, regarding her health and recovery, hoping she would return to work as soon as she could. A formal investigation was not conducted regarding Nakai. The reason given for this decision was that they feared that if they had started a formal investigation, it would have a negative impact on the woman's care if more people found out. So, they did not immediately and actively conduct interviews. Communication was difficult, and, to confirm delicate matters, they could only communicate with the woman through and with her doctors, and the idea was to wait until the situation stabilized.

Regarding the involvement of one of their staff in the invitation of the female who was Nakai's victim in that day's event as reported by Bunshun, Fuji has continued to deny it, citing inquiries and interviews with Nakai and other employees and staff, and to phone call records, but confirmed that that employee had indeed invited the woman to a barbeque in May, held in Nakai's house. In that occasion, at least 10 people were at the gathering. There was another gathering at a hotel in Tokyo in the winter of 2021 with Nakai and other people in the entertainment industry, Fuji employees, including the woman in question. Neither of the latter two meetings have been considered as an extension of the barbeque, nor has been revealed full confirmation of the reason for having the gathering. Regarding a question about considering female employees, like announcers, as "entertainment staff", Minato responded "We do have dinner parties with celebrities and TV show participants, New Year's parties and the like. Sometimes female announcers join in on these. I have never thought of them as entertainment staff", and reiterated, "I have always thought of them as one of our colleagues, attending a banquet together, so I have never personally perceived them as entertainment staff".

Regarding if they had considered filing some kind of claim for damages against Nakai, Endo replied, "The third-party committee has not yet reached a decision, so as of now, we have not." When asked if there was a possibility, he said, "The possibility may not be zero."

On January 28, 2025, it was reported that, just before the Fuji press conference on the 27, Weekly Bunshun had changed wording of its electronic version of the post dated December 25, 2024, omitting that the woman was invited to the incident day's dinner by a Fuji TV programming executive, changing it to that the invitation was from Nakai, as a continuation from a meeting that the executive had set up.

== See also ==
- Fujisankei Communications Group
- Television in Japan
- Hobankyo – Organization based in Japan that enforces Fuji Television copyright issues.
- Yukino Kikuma
