= Abe (surname) =

Abe (/ˈɑːbeɪ/ AH-bay, Japanese pronunciation: [abe] - written: 阿部) is the 25th most common Japanese surname. Less common variants are 安倍, 安部 and 阿倍. Notable people with the surname include:

- Akie Abe (安倍 昭恵; born 1962), Japanese socialite, radio personality and wife of Shinzō Abe, former Prime Minister of Japan
- Akiko Abe (阿部 哲子; born 1978), Japanese announcer and actress
- Abe Akira (阿部 昭; 1934–1989), Japanese writer
- Asami Abe (安倍 麻美; born 1985), Japanese singer and actress
- Atsushi Abe (阿部 敦; born 1981), Japanese voice actor
- Atsushi Abe (synchronized swimmer) (安部 篤史; born 1982), Japanese synchronized swimmer
- Daichi Abe (阿部 大治; born 1991), Japanese mixed martial artist
- Fuminori Abe (阿部史典; born 1995), Japanese professional wrestler
- Fumio Abe (阿部 文男; 1922–2006), Japanese politician
- Fuyumi Abe (阿部 芙蓉美; born 1983), Japanese singer-songwriter
- Genki Abe (安倍 源基; 1894–1989), Japanese lawyer, police bureaucrat and politician
- George Abe (安部 譲二; 1937–2019), pen name of Naoya Abe, Japanese manga writer
- Haruka Abe (安部 春香; born 1988), Japanese-English actress
- Heisuke Abe (阿部 平輔; 1886–1943), Japanese general
- Hifumi Abe (阿部 一二三; born 1997), Japanese judoka
- Abe no Hirafu (阿倍 比羅夫), 7th-century Japanese general
- Hiroaki Abe (阿部 弘毅; 1889–1949), Imperial Japanese Navy admiral
- Hiroki Abe (安部 裕葵; born 1999), Japanese footballer
- Abe no Hironiwa (安倍 広庭; 659–732), Japanese poet
- Hiroshi Abe (disambiguation), multiple people
- Hiroyuki Abe (disambiguation), multiple people
- Hisashi Abe (阿部 永; born 1933), Japanese zoologist
- Ichiro Abe (安部 一郎; 1922–2022), Japanese judoka
- Abe no Iratsume (阿倍 女郎), Japanese poet
- Isao Abe (阿部 功; 1912–1980), Japanese hammer thrower
- Abe Isoo (安部 磯雄; 1865–1949), Japanese Christian socialist and politician
- Jun Abe (阿部 淳; born 1955), Japanese photographer
- Kaito Abe (阿部 海大; born 1999), Japanese footballer
- Kamehiko Abe (阿部 亀彦; 1875–1928), Japanese politician
- Kan Abe (安倍 寛; 1894–1946), Japanese politician, father of Shintaro Abe
- Kana Abe (阿部 香菜; born 1988), Japanese judoka
- Kaoru Abe (阿部 薫; 1949–1978), Japanese jazz saxophonist
- Katsuyuki Abe (阿部 勝幸), Japanese table tennis player
- Katsuo Abe, Imperial Japanese Navy Admiral
- Kazuhisa Abe (1914–1996), American senator and judge in Hawaii
- Kazumi Abe (阿部 一視; born 1947), Japanese bobsledder
- Kazunari Abe (阿部 和成; born 1989), Japanese baseball player
- Kazuo Abe (阿部 一男; born 1935), Japanese sport wrestler
- Kazushige Abe (阿部 和重; born 1968), Japanese writer
- Kazuya Abe, Japanese mixed martial artist
- Keigo Abe (阿部 圭吾; 1938–2019), Japanese karateka
- Keiko Abe (安倍 圭子; born 1937), Japanese classical composer and marimba player
- Kenichi Abe (阿部 健市; 1923–?), Japanese World War II flying ace
- Kenjirō Abe (阿部 健治郎; born 1989), Japanese shogi player
- Kensaku Abe (阿部 謙作; born 1980), Japanese footballer
- Kenshiro Abbe (阿部 謙四郎; 1915–1985), Japanese martial artist in the United Kingdom
- Kenta Abe (阿部 健太; born 1984), Japanese baseball player
- Kinya Abe (安部 欣哉; born 1969), Japanese fencer
- Kōbō Abe (安部 公房; 1924–1993), pen name of Kimifusa Abe, Japanese writer
- Kohki Abe (阿部 浩己; born 1958), Japanese human rights activist
- Koji Abe (あべ こうじ; born 1975), Japanese comedian
- Kōmei Abe (安部 幸明; 1911–2006), Japanese classical composer
- Abe no Kooji (安倍 子祖父), Japanese poet
- Kōru Abe (阿部 光瑠; born 1994), Japanese shogi player
- Kōsō Abe (阿部 孝壮; 1892–1947), Imperial Japanese Navy admiral
- Kunihiro Abe (阿部 邦博; 1968–2018), Japanese animator
- Mao Abe (阿部 真央; born 1990), Japanese singer-songwriter
- Masahiro Abe (阿部 真宏; born 1978), Japanese baseball player
- Abe Masahiro (阿部 正弘; 1819-1857), Japanese Rōjū and daimyō
- Abe Masakatsu (阿部 正勝; 1541–1600), Japanese samurai
- Abe Masakoto (阿部 正功; 1860-1925), Japanese daimyō
- Abe Masakiyo (Shirakawa) (阿部 正静; 1850-1878), Japanese daimyō
- Abe Masanori (阿部 正権; 1806–1823), Japanese daimyō
- Masanori Abe (阿部 正紀; born 1991), Japanese footballer
- Masao Abe (阿部 正雄; 1915–2006), Japanese academic in Buddhist philosophy and comparative religion
- Masashi Abe (阿部 雅司; born 1965), Japanese Nordic combined skier
- Abe Masatō (阿部 正外; 1828–1887), Japanese daimyō
- Masatoshi Abe (阿部 正俊; 1942–2020), Japanese politician
- Abe Masatsugu (阿部 正次; 1569–1647), Japanese daimyō
- Abe Masayoshi (阿部 正由; 1769–1808), Japanese daimyō
- Mikishi Abe (阿部 美樹志; 1883–1965), Japanese architect and civil engineer
- Momoko Abe (阿部 桃子; born 1994), Japanese model
- Abe Motozane (安倍 元真; 1513–1587), Japanese samurai
- Abe no Munetō (安倍 宗任; 1032-1108), Japanese samurai
- Abe no Nakamaro (阿倍 仲麻呂; c. 698 – c. 770), Japanese scholar, administrator, and waka poet
- Nanami Abe (阿部 奈々美; born 1972), Japanese figure skating coach and choreographer
- Naoki Abe (阿部 直紀; born 1945), Japanese long jumper
- Natsumi Abe (安倍 なつみ; born 1981), Japanese singer and actress
- Nicole Abe (安部 ニコル; born 1993), Japanese fashion model
- Nikken Abe (阿部 日顕; 1922–2019), Japanese Buddhist monk
- Nina Abe (born 2007), Polish footballer
- Nobuyuki Abe (阿部 信行; 1875–1953), Japanese general, politician and Prime Minister of Japan
- Nobuyuki Abe (footballer) (阿部 伸行; born 1984), Japanese footballer
- Norifumi Abe (阿部 典史; 1975–2007), Japanese motorcycle racer
- Norihide Abe (阿部 規秀; 1887–1939), Imperial Japanese Army officer
- Noriyuki Abe (阿部 記之; born 1961), Japanese anime director
- Osamu Abe (disambiguation), multiple people
- Ryouhei Abe (阿部 亮平; born 1980), Japanese actor
- Ryuichi Abe (阿部 龍一; born 1954), Japanese academic
- Sada Abe (阿部 定; 1905–after 1970), Japanese convicted murderer, prostitute and actress
- Sadao Abe (阿部 サダヲ; born 1970), Japanese actor
- Abe no Sadato (安倍 貞任; 1019–1062), Japanese samurai
- Sanji Abe (阿部 三次; 1895–1982), American politician
- Sanshiro Abe (阿部 三子郎; born 1970), Japanese sport wrestler
- Satoru Abe (1926–2025), American sculptor and painter
- Abe no Seimei (安倍 晴明; 921–1005), Japanese onmyōji
- Seiseki Abe (阿部 醒石; 1915–2011), Japanese calligrapher and aikidoka
- Shigeaki Abe (阿部 成章; born 1947), Japanese basketball player
- Shigeki Abe (阿部 茂樹; born 1972), Japanese baseball player
- Shinnosuke Abe (阿部 慎之助; born 1979), Japanese baseball player
- Shintaro Abe (安倍 晋太郎; 1924–1991), Japanese politician, father of Shinzo
- Shinya Abe (阿部 晋也; born 1980), Japanese curler and curling coach
- Shinzō Abe (安倍 晋三; 1954–2022), Japanese politician and longest-serving postwar Prime Minister of Japan
- Shizue Abe (あべ 静江; born 1951), Japanese idol, actress and singer
- Shohei Abe (阿部 翔平; born 1983), Japanese footballer
- Shu Abe (阿部 嵩; born 1984), Japanese footballer
- Shuichi Abe (阿部 守一; born 1960), Japanese politician
- Shuto Abe (安部 柊斗; born 1997), Japanese footballer
- Abe Tadaaki (阿部 忠秋; 1602–1671), Japanese daimyō
- Tadashi Abe (阿部 正; 1926–1984), Japanese aikidoka
- Tadashi Abe (rower) (阿部 肇; born 1963), Japanese rower
- Tadatoshi Abe (安倍 忠俊; born 1931), Japanese field hockey player
- Takao Abe (阿部 孝夫; born 1943), Japanese politician
- Takashi Abe (阿部 隆; born 1976), Japanese shogi player
- Takatoshi Abe (安部 孝駿; born 1991), Japanese hurdler
- Takuma Abe (阿部 拓馬; born 1987), Japanese footballer
- Takumi Abe (阿部 巧; born 1991), Japanese footballer
- Tazuko Abe (阿部 多津子), Japanese table tennis player
- Teruo Abe (安部 輝雄), Japanese footballer
- Tokiharu Abe (阿部 宗明; 1911–1996), Japanese ichthyologist
- Tomoe Abe (安部 友恵; born 1971), Japanese ultramarathon runner
- Tomohiro Abe (安部 友裕; born 1989), Japanese baseball player
- Tomoji Abe (阿部 知二; 1903–1973), Japanese writer, social critic, humanist and translator
- Tomoko Abe (阿部 知子; born 1948), Japanese politician
- Toru Abe (安部 徹; 1917–1993), Japanese actor
- Toshihito Abe (阿部 俊人; born 1988), Japanese baseball player
- Toshiki Abe (阿部 寿樹; born 1989), Japanese baseball player
- Toshiko Abe (阿部 俊子; born 1959), Japanese politician
- Toshiyuki Abe (阿部 敏之; born 1974), Japanese footballer
- Tsuyoshi Abe (阿部 力; born 1982), Japanese actor
- Uta Abe (阿部 詩; born 2000), Japanese judoka
- Wakako Abe (阿部 和香子; born 1966), Japanese cyclist
- Wataru Abe (阿部 渉; born 1967), Japanese announcer, television personality, and news anchor
- Yasuhiro Abe (安部 恭弘), Japanese musician
- Abe no Yasuna, a disciple of Kamo no Yasunori and father of Abe no Seimei
- Yasurō Abe (阿部 泰郎; born 1953), Japanese academic
- Abe no Yoritoki (安倍 頼時; died 1057), Japanese samurai
- Yoshiharu Abe (阿部 義晴; born 1966), Japanese musician and record producer
- Yoshimitsu Abe (阿部 芳光; 1898–1969), Japanese general
- Yoshinori Abe (阿部 良則; born 1972), Japanese footballer
- Yoshio Abe (阿部 余四男; 1891–1960), Japanese zoologist
- Yoshiro Abe (阿部 吉朗; born 1980), Japanese footballer
- Yoshishige Abe (安倍 能成; 1883–1966), Japanese philosopher, educator and politician
- Yoshitoshi Abe (安倍 吉俊; born 1971), Japanese graphic artist
- Yoshiyuki Abe (阿部 良之; born 1969), Japanese cyclist
- Yuji Abe (阿部 祐二; born 1958), Japanese television journalist and actor
- Yuki Abe (阿部 勇樹; born 1981), Japanese footballer
- Yukie Abe (阿部ゆきえ), born 1974) better known as Sachie Abe, Japanese professional wrestler
- Yumiko Abe (阿部 由美子; born 1979), better known as Yumi Ohka, Japanese professional wrestler
- Abe Yumeri (阿部夢梨; born 2002), Japanese actress and former singer
- Yurika Abe (阿部 友里香; born 1995), Japanese Paralympic cross-country skier and biathlete
- Yuta Abe (安部 雄大; born 1974), Japanese footballer
- Yutaka Abe (阿部 豊; 1895–1977), Japanese film director
- Yutaro Abe (阿部 祐大朗; born 1984), Japanese footballer

== Other people ==
- Magnus Ngei Abe (born 1965), Nigerian politician
- David Abe, American electrical engineer
- Joshua Abe (born 2010), English footballer

== See also ==
- Abe clan, a Japanese clan
