= Hisashi =

Hisashi is a masculine Japanese given name. Its meaning differs depending on the kanji used to write it.

== Kanji ==
Single kanji used to write the name Hisashi include:

- 久: "long time"
- 永: "eternal"
- 尚: "still"
- 準: "standard"
- 彌: "complete"
- 長: "long"
- 寿: "life" (also with the kyūjitai variant 壽)
- 昶: "long day"

There are more than a hundred different ways to write the name using two or three characters.

== People with the name ==
- Hisashi Abe (阿部 永; born 1933), Japanese zoologist
- Hisashi Aikyoh (愛敬 尚史; born 1976), Japanese former Nippon Professional Baseball player
- Hisashi Appiah Tawiah (アピア タウィア 久; born 1998), Japanese professional footballer
- Hisashi Asō (麻生 久; 1891–1940), Japanese socialist politician and trade unionist
- Hisashi Eguchi (江口 寿史; born 1956), Japanese manga artist
- Hisashi Hieda (日枝 久; born 1937), Japanese business magnate
- Hisashi Hirai (平井 久司; born 1959), Japanese manga artist
- Hisashi Igawa (井川 比佐志; born 1936), Japanese actor
- Hisashi Imai (今井 寿; born 1965), Japanese guitarist and songwriter
- Hisashi Inatsu (稲津 久; born 1958), Japanese former politician
- Hisashi Inoue (井上 ひさし; 1934–2010), Japanese writer and playwright
- Hisashi Inoue (historian) (井上 久士; born 1950), Japanese historian
- Hisashi Iwakuma (岩隈 久志; born 1981), Japanese former professional baseball pitcher
- Hisashi Jogo (城後 寿; born 1986), Japanese footballer
- Hisashi Kagawa (香川 久; born 1965), Japanese animator, character designer and animation director
- Hisashi Kaneko (金子 久; born 1959), Japanese former football player
- Hisashi Kasai (葛西 久; born 1943), Japanese ice hockey player
- Hisashi Kato (加藤 久; born 1956), Japanese football manager
- Hisashi Katsuta (勝田 久; 1927–2020), Japanese actor and voice actor
- Hisashi Kazama (風間 昶; born 1947), Japanese former politician
- Hisashi Kimura (木村 栄; 1870–1943), Japanese astronomer
- Hisashi Kobayashi (小林 久志; born 1938), Japanese electrical engineer and computer scientist
- Hisashi Kuno (久野 久; 1910–1969), Japanese geologist
- Hisashi Kurosaki (黒崎 久志; born 1968), Japanese football player
- Hisashi Matsuda (松田 久; 1924–2011), Japanese physicist
- Hisashi Matsumoto (松本 尚; born 1962), Japanese politician
- Hisashi Matsuoka (松岡 寿; 1862–1944), Japanese painter
- Hisashi Mitakeumi (御嶽海 久司; born 1992), Japanese sumo wrestler
- Hisashi Miura (三浦 久; 1931–2024), Japanese lawyer and politician
- Hisashi Miyazaki (宮崎 久; born 1981), Japanese retired bobsledder and track and field sprinter
- Hisashi Mizugami (水上 久; born 1925), Japanese alpine skier
- Hisashi Mizutori (水鳥 寿思; born 1980), Japanese gymnast
- Hisashi Namekata (行方 尚史; born 1973), Japanese shogi player
- Hisashi Nogami (野上恒; born 1971), Japanese video game developer
- Hisashi Nozawa (野沢 尚; 1960–2004), Japanese screenwriter and mystery novelist
- Hisashi Ogura (小倉 久史; born 1968), Japanese shogi player
- Hisashi Ohashi (大橋 尚志; born 1996), Japanese football player
- Hisashi Okamoto (岡本 久; born 1956), Japanese applied mathematician
- Hisashi Okuyama (奥山 ひさし; born 1941), Japanese poet
- Hisashi Owada (小和田 恆; born 1932), Japanese former jurist, diplomat and law professor
- Hisashi Ouchi (大内久; born 1965, died 1999), Nuclear Power Plant Technician
- Hisashi Sagara (相良 久; born 1980), Japanese film editor
- Hisashi Sakaguchi (坂口 尚; 1946–1995), Japanese manga artist and animator
- Hisashi Shinma (新間 寿; 1935–2025), Japanese professional wrestling booker and professional wrestling promoter
- Hisashi Takayama (高山 久; born 1981), Japanese former baseball player
- Hisashi Takeda (武田 久; born 1978), Japanese baseball player
- Hisashi Terao (寺尾 寿; 1855–1923), Japanese astronomer and mathematician
- Hisashi Tonomura (外村 尚; born 1972), known mononymously as Hisashi (musician)
- Hisashi Tokunaga (徳永 久志; born 1963), Japanese politician
- Hisashi Tsuchida (土田 尚史; born 1967), Japanese football player
- Hisashi Wada (和田 久; born 1962), Japanese racing driver and team principal
- Hisashi Wakahara (born 1945), Japanese equestrian
- Hisashi Yamada (山田 久志; born 1948), Japanese baseball pitcher
- Hisashi Yamaguchi (山口 久; 1952–2010), Japanese sumo wrestler
- Hisashi Yamamoto (山本 尚; born 1943), Japanese organic chemist
- Hisashi Yokoshima (横島 久; born 1957), Japanese retired racing driver

== Fictional characters ==
- Hisashi Igo (井豪 永), a character from High School of the Dead
- Hisashi Kinoshita (木下 久志), a character from Haikyu!! with the position of wing spiker from Karasuno High
- Hisashi Mitsui (三井 寿), a character from Slam Dunk

== See also ==
- Joe Hisaishi (久石 譲; born 1950), Japanese composer
