= Hisashi Hieda =

Japanese television executive (born 1937)

Hisashi Hieda KBE
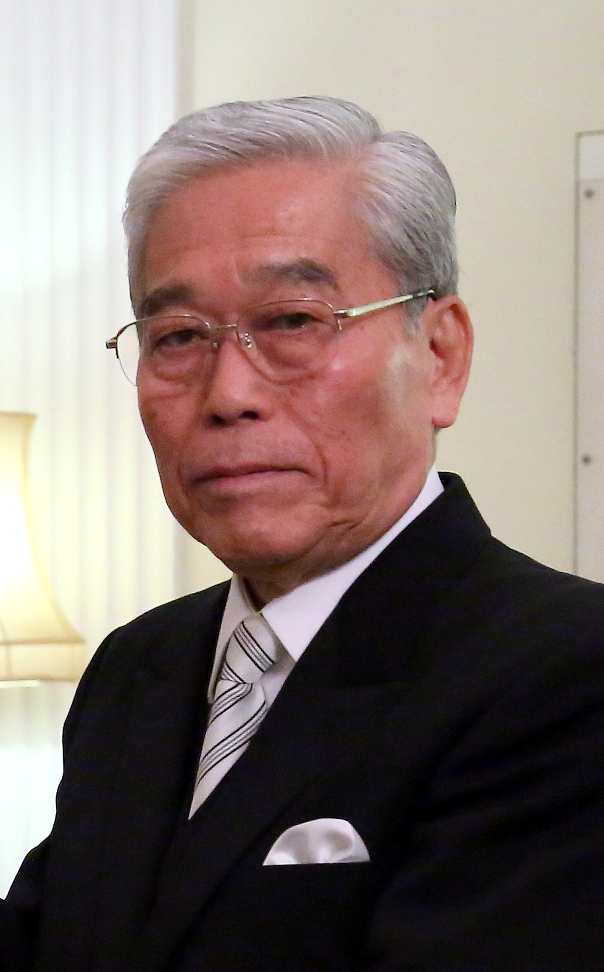
- Hisashi Hieda in 2014
- Born: December 31, 1937 (age 88); Tokyo, Japan
- Education: Social Studies, School of Education, Waseda University (BA)
- Occupations: Businessman; media proprietor; investor; philanthropist; museum director
- Years active: 1961–present
- Known for: Driving Force Behind Fuji Media Holdings & Fuji TV's Expansion
- Title: Chairperson of Fujisankei Communications Group; Executive Managing Advisor of Fuji Media Holdings, Inc.; Non-Executive Director & Advisor of Sankei Shimbun Co., Ltd.; Chairperson of The Hakone Open-Air Museum; Chairperson of The Japan Art Association
- Awards: Grand Cordon of the Order of the Rising Sun (2013); Knight of the Order of the British Empire (2014); Order of Brilliant Star with Violet Grand Cordon (2023)

Hisashi Hieda (日枝 久, born December 31, 1937) is a Japanese business magnate, media proprietor, television executive, film producer and philanthropist who was the Chairperson of Fujisankei Communications Group. He serves as the Chairperson of the Japan Art Association, which operates the Ueno Royal Museum and the Praemium Imperiale, as well as the Director of the Hakone Open-Air Museum and the Director of the Utsukushi-Ga-Hara Open-Air Museum.

He transformed the Fujisankei Communications Group into one of the world's leading and Japan's largest media conglomerates and nurtured Fuji Television Network into a comprehensive entertainment entity of Japan.

== Biography ==
Mr. Hieda, who introduced the slogan "If it's not fun, it's not television," joined the broadcaster in 1961 and became President and CEO of Fuji Television Network in 1988.

In 1992, he successfully carried out a "coup" to dismiss Hiroaki Shikanai, the son-in-law of Fujisankei Communications Group founder Nobutaka Shikanai and the then-chairman. Subsequently, Fuji TV became known as the "Hieda regime".

He has held the post of Chairperson of the Japan Art Association since 2008.

For many years, Mr. Hieda led the management of Fuji Media Holdings as the Executive Chairperson & CEO. He also introduced programs that catapulted Fuji Television from fourth to first place in the ratings and turned it into Japan's most profitable network. Hieda has also been involved in the company's successful moviemaking activities.

Dalton Investments, a major shareholder holding over 7% of Fuji Media Holdings' shares, referred to Hieda as a 'dictator' and demanded his resignation in the wake of Masahiro Nakai's scandal

On March 27, 2025, Fuji Media Holdings announced that Hieda would resign as the company's advisor and representative of the Fujisankei Communications Group.

== Professional experience ==
- April 1961 - Joined Fuji Television Network, Inc. (currently known as Fuji Media Holdings, Inc.)
- May 1980 - General Manager, Programming Department, Fuji Television Network, Inc.
- June 1983 - Executive Managing Director and General Manager of Programming Department, Fuji Television Network, Inc.
- June 1986 - Senior Executive Managing Director and Chief Business Development Officer, Fuji Television Network, Inc.
- June 1988 - President and Representative Director, Fuji Television Network, Inc.
- June 1989 - Non-Executive Director, The Sankei Building Co., Ltd. (to date)
- June 1991 - Non-Executive Director, Hokkaido Cultural Broadcasting Co., Ltd. (to date)
- June 1992 - Non-Executive Director, Sankei Shimbun Co., Ltd.
- June 1992 - Executive Chairperson, Fujisankei Communications International, Inc.
- June 1993 - Non-Executive Director & Advisor, Sankei Shimbun Co., Ltd. (to date)
- June 1993 - Non-Executive Director, Tokai Television Broadcasting Co., Ltd. (to date)
- June 1993 - Non-Executive Director, Television Nishinippon Corporation (to date)
- June 1994 - Non-Executive Director, Kansai Telecasting Corporation (currently known as Kansai Television Co., Ltd.) (to date)
- June 2001 - Chairperson and Chief Executive Officer, Fuji Television Network, Inc.
- April 2003 - President, Japan Commercial Broadcasters Association
- July 2003 - Chairperson, Fujisankei Communications Group (to date)
- July 2005 - Executive Managing Advisor, Fujisankei Communications International, Inc.
- October 2008 - Chairperson and Chief Executive Officer, Fuji Media Holdings, Inc. (Note: In October 2008, Fuji Television Network, Inc. (the former entity) transitioned to a certified broadcasting holding company and changed its name to Fuji Media Holdings, Inc. Through a company split, the television broadcasting operations were transferred to the newly established Fuji Television Network, Inc. (the new entity).)
- October 2008 - Chairperson and Chief Executive Officer, Fuji Television Network, Inc.
- June 2017 - Executive Managing Advisor, Fuji Media Holdings, Inc. (to date)
- June 2017 - Executive Managing Advisor, Fuji Television Network, Inc.
- March 2018 - Non-Executive Director & Advisor, Okayama Broadcasting Co., Ltd. (to date)
- July 2023 - Director, Hakone Open-Air Museum and Utsukushi-Ga-Hara Open-Air Museum (to date)

== Honors and awards ==
- Honorary Doctorate in Business Administration - Korea University - 2010
- Honorary Doctorate - Waseda University - 2010
- The Grand Cordon of the Order of the Rising Sun - Japan - 2013
- Knight Commander of the Order of the British Empire (KBE) - United Kingdom - 2014
- Order of Brilliant Star with Violet Grand Cordon - Republic of China - 2023
