= 1989 visit by Ronald and Nancy Reagan to Japan =

From 20 to 28 October 1989, the former President of the United States, Ronald Reagan, and his wife, Nancy, toured Japan for eight days. The trip was at the invitation of the Fujisankei Communications Group and the government of Japan. The Reagans had two days of official visits, including lunch with Emperor Akihito and Empress Michiko. Reagan was paid $2 million for the trip.

== Background ==
The trip occurred less than a year after Reagan left office and was Reagan's first public appearance since brain surgery after falling off his horse. Reagan was paid $2 million for the trip (equivalent to $5,194,631 in 2025), with the trip costing his hosts, the Fujisankei Communications Group and the Japanese government, $7 million. The trip was arranged by Charles Z. Wick, who acted as Reagan's agent. Reagan met Nobutaka Shikanai, the founder of the Fujisankei Communications Group in the Oval Office in 1988. Wick subsequently met Shikanai's son, Hiroaki Shikanai in Tokyo during Reagan's 1988 state visit to Japan and discussed a future trip by Reagan.

== Schedule ==
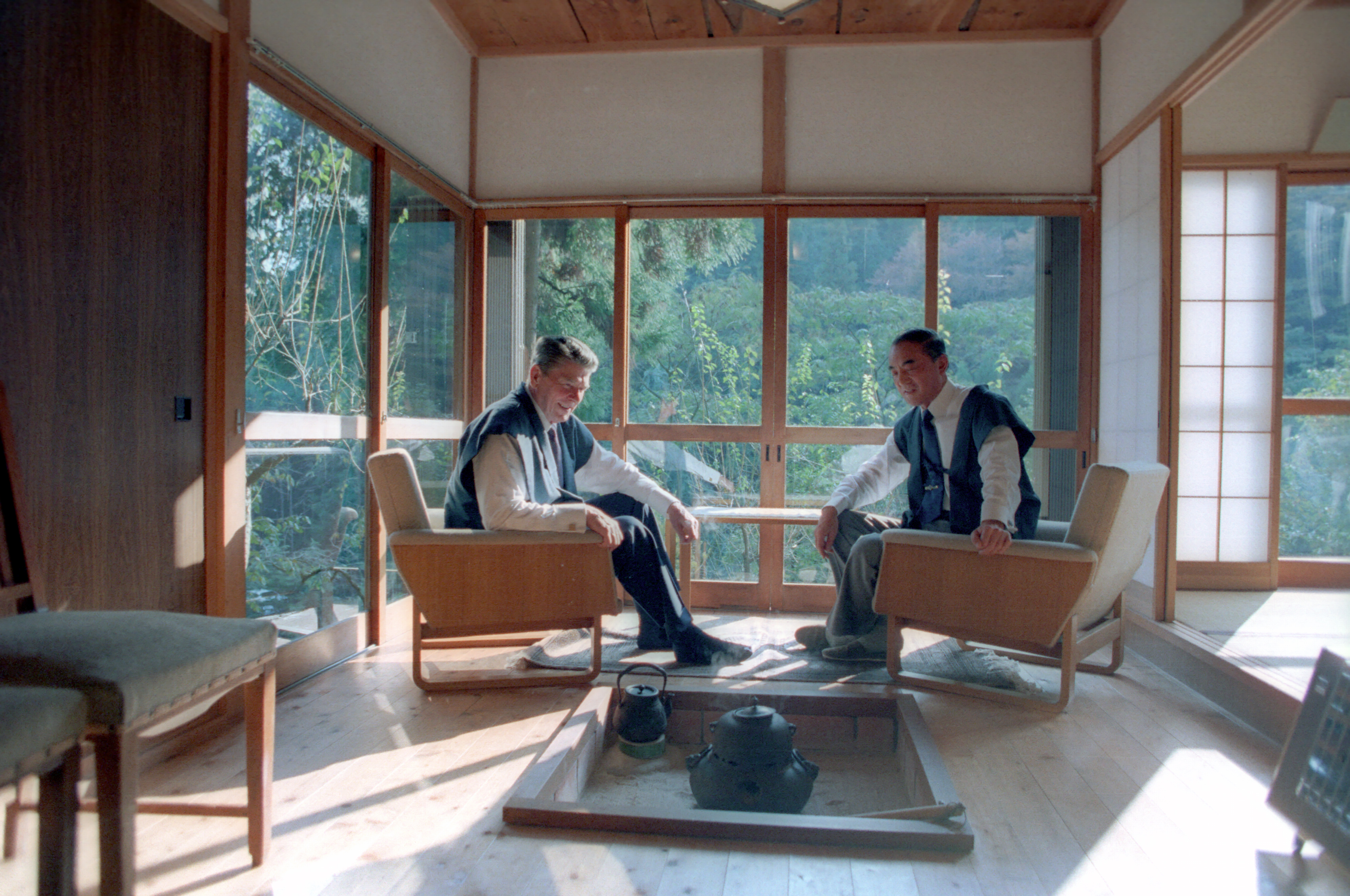
Reagan and Prime Minister Yasuhiro Nakasone having lunch at Nakasone's country residence in Tokyo on a previous visit to Japan in 1983

The newspaper Sankei Shimbun had the headline "MR. AMERICA IS COMING". The Reagan's visit received little coverage in media not owned by Fujisankei.

The Reagans flew to Japan in a chartered TWA Boeing 747 with a bedroom and shower. The couple were accompanied by 20 members of staff and 12 Secret Service agents. 229 relatives of American military personnel also travelled with the Reagans to visit their relatives who were stationed in Japan. The couple were welcomed in a ceremony at Haneda Airport and then toured the Hakone Open-Air Museum owned by Fujisankei. They stayed in a guest house at Chuseido in Hakone owned by the company near Mount Fuji. had refurbed the house at a cost of $140,000 installing an elevator and a bath fed by a natural spring. Reagan said of Hakone that "Here in the sun, rain, and clouds is the heart of Japan ... this land is truly blessed" after receiving a key to the city.

The schedule for the trip consisted of "lunches, cocktails, banquets, receptions, photo opportunities, meetings and tours". The Reagans attended a gala 'Friendship Concert' attended by 17,000 guests at the Yokohama Arena in their honor. Performers at the concert included Perry Como, Placido Domingo, the Boys Choir of Harlem and the Japanese singer Yuzo Kayama. After the concert Reagan gave a speech which left people confused as it was largely about criticising the American press for describing the entertainment industry as narcissistic.

On 24 October Reagan threw the ceremonial first pitch at Game 3 of the 1989 Japan Series between Kintetsu Buffaloes and Yomiuri Giants at the Tokyo Dome.

Reagan also gave a speech and attended a banquet held in honor of the inaugural winners of the Praemium Imperiale, an award established by the Japan Art Association. One of the inaugural winners of the prize, the painter David Hockney said that "But they're paying Reagan more, aren't they" when told that half of his $100,000 prize money was funded by Fujisankei.

While in Japan at the Embassy of the United States, Tokyo, the Reagans encountered their friend, the comedian Bob Hope who had been performing at a charity function. Hope told Wick that an interpreter had slowed down his comedy as " ... there were 300 or 400 Americans in the audience who would laugh when I got to the punch line. By the time the interpreter got through with the joke, the Japanese just went 'heh, heh, heh.' I mean, I was on my knees".

Reagan received the Grand Cordon of the Supreme Order of the Chrysanthemum from Emperor Akihito for "mainting an developing friendly relations and coopoeration between the United States and Japan" during his presidency.

In his speeches Reagan urged the Japanese government to support the burgeoning democracy movement in Poland and to reject thoughts of American economic and social decline. Reagan said that "I'm told there are those in Japan who believe the United States is a declining superpower propped up with Japanese technology, that the United States is lazy, soft, and simply living off past glory ... Well, I say to those voices of demise the same thing I said to the voices of demise in my own country a few years back: You don't understand America. You don't understand our strength and potential". The Reagans attended banquets with Emperor Akihito and Empress Michiko at the Akasaka Palace as well as the Prime Minister Toshiki Kaifu and former prime ministers Yasuhiro Nakasone and Noboru Takeshita. Kaifu told Reagan that "If there were no problems on intellectual property rights" he would "love to steal the secret of being a Great Communicator". Reagan was not known to have eaten any Japanese food on the trip and French haute cuisine was served at the banquets.

A reception at the Okura Hotel was held in honor of Nancy Reagan and was attended by "100 illustrious, successful or well-married women of Tokyo". The reception included Princess Takamatsu, the widow of Nobuhito, Prince Takamatsu, Sachiyo Kaifu, the wife of Prime Minister Toshiki Kaifu, as well as the wives of ambassadors and industrialists and leading business executives. Nancy Reagan gave a speech on drug abuse at the reception telling the audience that "I know that once introduced, drugs do not respect families or traditions. They destroy them. And I know criminals are criminals the world round, and I don't believe any criminal element will forever deny itself the huge profits waiting to be made in cocaine".

In one television interview Reagan commented on the takeover of Columbia Pictures by Sony. Reagan said that he "[didn't] think there's anything wrong with that" and that he "[had] a feeling that maybe Hollywood needs some outsiders to bring back decency and good taste to some of the pictures that are being made". Reagan subsequently apologised for his remark at a luncheon hosted by the Hollywood Radio and Television Society saying that "what a person says in one country is often minterpreted in another". Reagan also sought $1 million donation in audio visual equipment from Sony for his presidential library. He denied that his praise for Sony was linked to the planned donation. The Japanese government donated $2 million to the library. Several hundreds of thousands of private donations were expected.

== Reception ==
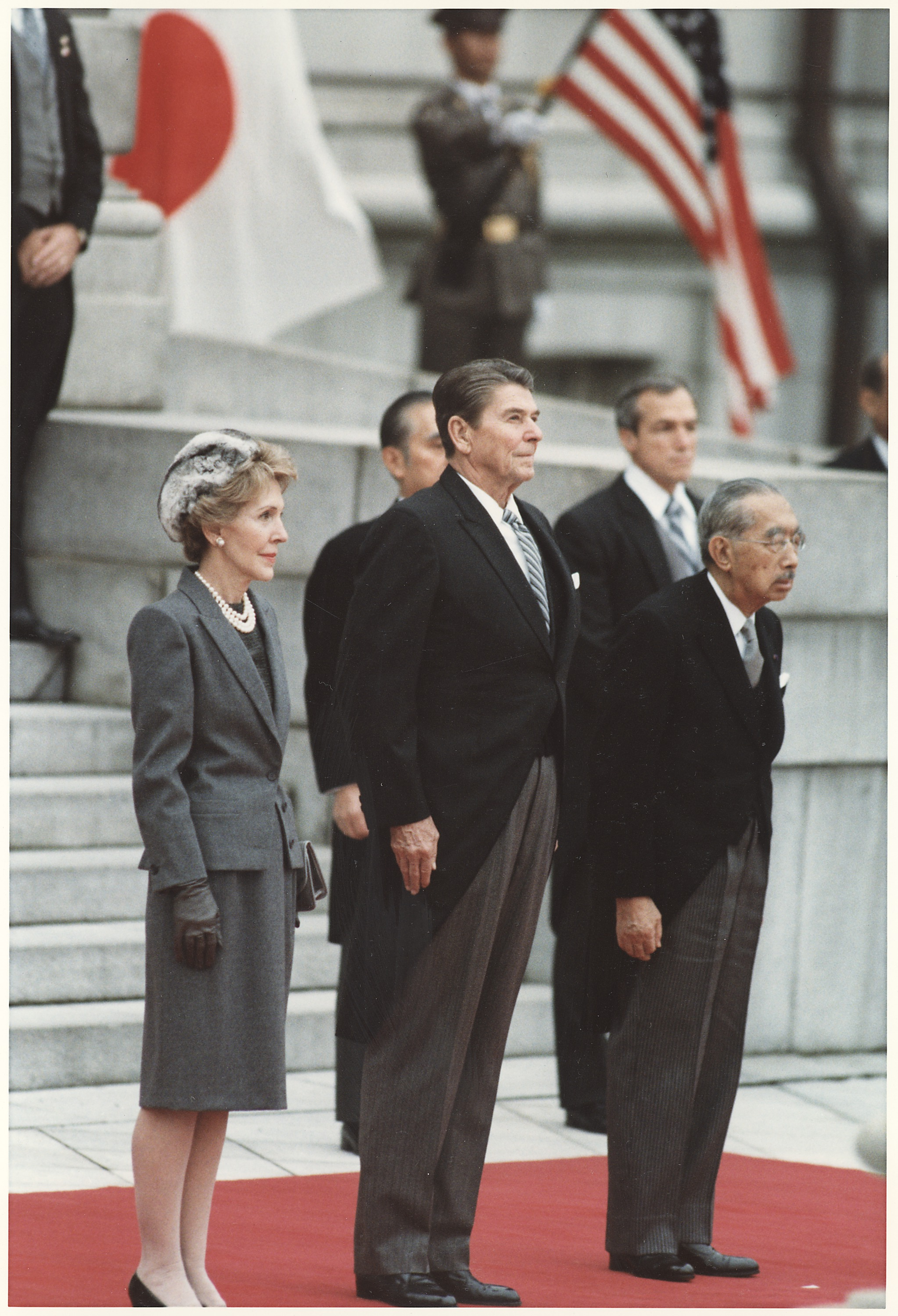
The Reagans and Japanese Emperor Hirohito on a 1983 trip to Japan

The trip was criticised by political commentators in the United States. The historian Henry Graff said that "The founding fathers - Washington, Adams, Jefferson, Madison - would have been stunned that an occupant of the highest office in this land turned it into bucks". Editorials in The Boston Globe and The New York Times criticized the trip. The New York Times wrote that " ... the Reagans' willing participation is as disturbing as their extraordinary compensation. Former Presidents haven't always comported themselves with dignity after leaving the Oval Office. But none have plunged so blatantly into pure commercialism". The Baltimore Sun wrote that "We don't know at what point an ex-president crosses the line between popular public appearance and exploitation of office, but we do know that giving million-dollar speeches for foreign corporations is way over the line".

The Boston Globe wrote that critics "may have never perceived Reagan's uniqueness" as his style was "that of a performer who presided over government" and his speeches for Fujisankei could be seen as a reprise of his work for General Electric but with "more fanfare and better pay".

The columnist William Safire was critical of the trip writing that "Let us grant our former leaders the right to make money in great fistfuls, especially in memoirs; it's a free country, and they are private citizens ... But there is such a thing as seemliness, decorum, respect for high office once held". Safire concluded that "For a former President with a hot agent and no sense of sleaze, the profit opportunities are endless". Yukio Okamoto, the director of the First North America Division at the Japanese foreign ministry said that the focus on Reagan's $2 million fee was "very, very unfortunate" as Reagan was "not the kind of person whose policy would be influenced by money" and that he was still "a larger-than-life symbol of what they see as the old America of strength and can-do optimism".

Reagan said that "It was [true] that figure was offered and I didn't protest" and that there was a Hollywood actor who received $3 million for a commercial for Toyota. He also jokingly said that for the last 16 years he "hadn't made any kind of money" and that on the trip he sought to eliminate any remaining barriers on free trade between Japan and the United States. The former British prime minister Edward Heath was present at one of the events attended by Reagan and jokingly said that his only concern was that he wanted "$2 million for my next 20 minutes". Nancy Reagan said that "We didn't ask for the money that was offered in Japan ... It was offered to us. Both of us are going. We're both working very hard over there. We're taking the wives of servicemen over there so they can visit their husbands. And other people have gone over there and been paid comparably". Reagan then said that "Japan is different. I'm not going to get into this".

In November 1989 former president Jimmy Carter said that he had never been offered $2 million for speaking. Carter also said that he had " ... never criticized what Presidents Nixon, Ford or Reagan do with their post-White House years ... But that's not what I want out of life. We give money, we don't take it".

Elisabeth Bumiller wrote that it was "strange to see [Reagan] so stripped of the powers of the presidency" being "more on his own than he had been in eight years". She wrote that he "arrived at one banquet with a trumpet fanfare but no "Hail to the Chief" and left to the bittersweet strains of a Mozart string quartet".

People magazine wrote that people were "charmed by the smile that has come to be known as the Ron sumairu. Reagan-san made plenty of people feel good - and for that, his hosts may have reckoned, the price was right".
