= Fuyumi =

- Gender: Female

Origin
- Origin: Japanese
- Meaning: Different meanings depending on the kanji used

Fuyumi (written 冬美, 冬実, 不由美 or 芙蓉美) is a feminine Japanese given name. A common meaning is "winter beauty". Notable people with the name include:

- Fuyumi Abe (阿部 芙蓉美; born 1983), Japanese singer-songwriter
- Fuyumi Ono (小野 不由美; born 1960), Japanese novelist
- Fuyumi Sakamoto (坂本 冬美; born 1967), Japanese singer
- Fuyumi Shiraishi (白石 冬美; 1936–2019), Japanese voice actress
- Fuyumi Soryo (惣領 冬実; born 1959), Japanese manga artist

== Fictional characters ==
- Fuyumi Irisu (入須 冬実), a character in the Classic Literature Club (Hyouka) novel series
- Fuyumi Mizuhara (水原 冬美), a character in the manga series Food Wars!: Shokugeki no Soma
- Fuyumi Todoroki (轟 冬美), a character in the manga series My Hero Academia
- Fuyumi Yanagi (柳 冬実), a character in the manga series Blood Lad
