= Tadatoshi =

- Gender: Male

Origin
- Origin: Japanese
- Meaning: Different meanings depending on the kanji used

Tadatoshi (written: 忠利 or 忠俊) is a masculine Japanese given name. Notable people with the name include:

- Tadatoshi Abe (安倍 忠俊; born 1931), Japanese field hockey player
- Tadatoshi Akiba (秋葉 忠利; born 1942), Japanese politician and activist
- Aoyama Tadatoshi (青山 忠俊; 1578–1643), Japanese daimyō
- Hosokawa Tadatoshi (細川 忠利; 1586–1641), Japanese daimyō
- Tadatoshi Masuda (増田 忠俊; born 1973), Japanese footballer
