= 永 =

永, meaning "eternal", may refer to:

- Young (Korean name), also spelled Yeong, Korean family name and given name
- Hisashi, Japanese given name

== See also ==
- Eight Principles of Yong, the calligraphic principles for writing this character
- CJK Unified Ideographs, the Unicode block which contains this character
