= Prime Minister Abe =

Prime Minister Abe may refer to:

- Nobuyuki Abe (1875–1953), 25th prime minister of Japan
- Shinzō Abe (1954–2022), 57th and 63rd prime minister of Japan

== See also ==
- Abe (surname)
