= Kazunari =

- Gender: Male

Origin
- Origin: Japanese
- Meaning: Different meanings depending on the kanji used

Kazunari is a masculine Japanese given name.

== Written forms ==
Kazunari can be written using different kanji characters and can mean:

- 和成, "peace/harmony, become"
- 和也, "peace/harmony, to be"
- 一成, "one, become"
- 一就, "one, settle

== People with the name ==
- Kazunari Abe (阿部和成; born 1989), Japanese baseball player
- Kazunari Hosaka (保坂一成; born 1983), Japanese footballer
- Kazunari Ichimi (一美和成; born 1997), Japanese footballer
- Kazunari Ishii (石井一成; born 1994), Japanese baseball player
- Kazunari Koga (古賀一成; born 1972), Japanese footballer
- Kazunari Kojima (小嶋一成; born 1977), Japanese voice actor
- Kazunari Murakami (村上和成; born 1973), Japanese professional wrestler and mixed martial artist
- Kazunari Ninomiya (二宮和也; born 1983), Japanese idol, singer, songwriter, actor, voice actor and radio host
- Kazunari Okayama (岡山一成; born 1978), Japanese footballer
- Kazunari Ono (大野和成; born 1989), Japanese footballer
- Saji Kazunari (佐治一成; 1569–1634), Japanese samurai
- Kazunari Sanematsu (實松一成; born 1981), Japanese baseball player
- Kazunari Sasaki (佐々木一成; born 1962), Japanese cross-country skier
- Kazunari Tanaka (田中一成; 1965–2016), Japanese voice actor
- Kazunari Tsuruoka (鶴岡一成; born 1977), Japanese baseball player
- Kazunari Watanabe (渡邉一成; born 1983), Japanese cyclist
