= Yasurō =

- Pronunciation: jasɯɾoɯ (IPA)
- Gender: Male

Origin
- Origin: Japanese
- Meaning: Different meanings depending on the kanji used

Other names
- Alternative spelling: Yasuro (Kunrei-shiki) Yasuro (Nihon-shiki) Yasurō, Yasuro, Yasurou (Hepburn)

Yasurō, Yasuro or Yasurou is a masculine Japanese given name.

== Written forms ==
Yasurō can be written using different combinations of kanji characters. Here are some examples:

- 康郎, "healthy, son"
- 康朗, "healthy, clear"
- 安郎, "tranquil, son"
- 安朗, "tranquil, clear"
- 保郎, "preserve, son"
- 保朗, "preserve, clear"
- 泰郎, "peaceful, son"
- 泰朗, "peaceful, clear"
- 易郎, "divination, son"
- 也寸郎, "to be, measurement, son"

The name can also be written in hiragana やすろう or katakana ヤスロウ.

== Notable people with the name ==
- Yasuro Abe (阿部 泰郎; born 1953), Japanese academic
- Yasuro Kikuchi (菊池 康郎; born 1929), Japanese Go player
