= Fujisankei Communications Group =

Japanese company

- "Mentama Mark (目ん玉マーク)", used since April 1986

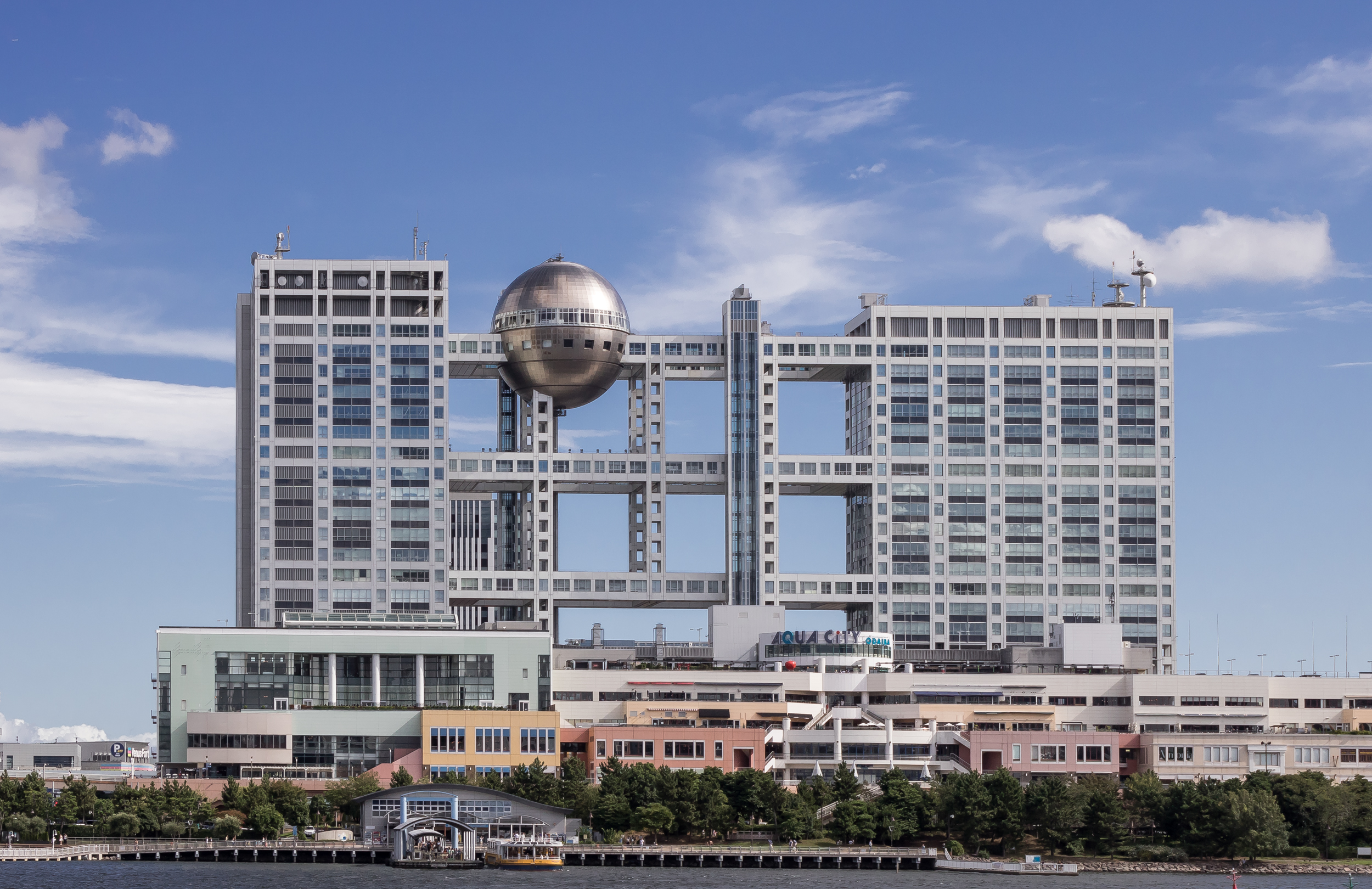
- FCG Building, Daiba, Minato, Tokyo
- Native name: フジサンケイグループ
- Romanized name: Fujisankei Gurūpu
- Formerly: Fuji Sankei Group (1967-1985)
- Type: Keiretsu; Media conglomerate
- Industry: Mass media
- Founded: 1967
- Founder: Nobutaka Shikanai (1st Chair)
- Headquarters: FCG Building, 2-4-8, Daiba, Minato-ku, Tokyo 137-8088, Japan
- Members: Hisashi Hieda (chair)
- Website: fujisankei-g.co.jp

The Fujisankei Communications Group (フジサンケイグループ, Fujisankei Gurūpu), abbreviated FCG, is Japan's largest media conglomerate. Its chair is Hisashi Hieda. The group engages in a wide range of businesses, from media and entertainment, including television, news, sports, radio, publishing, film, music, content distribution, soft packaging, and e-commerce, to real estate development, management, and investment, as well as the management of tourism facilities such as hotels and aquariums.

In addition, FCG endeavors in cultural enterprises such as The Hakone Open-Air Museum, The Utsukushi-Ga-Hara Open-Air Museum, and The Ueno Royal Museum. Often referred to as the "Nobel Prize for the Arts" by media both within and outside of the country, the Praemium Imperiale is one of FCG's most profound projects organized by the Japan Art Association.

The annual revenue in 1991 was $5 billion, making it the largest media conglomerate in the world at the time. Many of its affiliates are owned by Fuji Media Holdings, Inc., a member of FCG.

FCG has established strong connections with various organizations:

- Hankyu Hanshin Toho Group
- Chunichi Shimbun Co., Ltd. (Chunichi)
- The Hokkaido Shimbun Press Co., Ltd. (Doshin)
- The Nishinippon Shimbun Co., Ltd.

Toho holds the largest share in Fuji Media Holdings, while Hankyu Hanshin Holdings, Inc. is the second-largest shareholder of Kansai Television Co., Ltd. (KTV), Fuji Network System's (FNS) affiliate station in the Kansai region. Chunichi owns Tokai Television Broadcasting Co., Ltd. (THK) and several other Fuji Network companies in Central Japan (Chubu), Doshin manages Fuji Network's Hokkaido Cultural Broadcasting Co., Ltd. (UHB), and Nishinippon Shimbun operates Fuji Network's Television Nishinippon Corporation (TNC).

== History ==
The Fujisankei Communications Group was created in 1967 as part of an agreement between the radio stations Nippon Broadcasting System, Inc. and Nippon Cultural Broadcasting, Inc., the television broadcaster Fuji Television Network, Inc. and the newspaper Sankei Shimbun Co., Ltd. This media conglomerate was founded by Nobutaka Shikanai. "Fujisankei" is a portmanteau of Fuji Television and Sankei Shimbun.

In 1985, Haruo Shikanai became executive chairman and CEO of Fuji Television Network, Sankei Shimbun, and Nippon Broadcasting System, as well as executive chairman and CEO of the Fujisankei Communications Group. Haruo Shikanai dramatically improved Fuji Television's performance and made it the number one entertainment company in Japan. In 1988, Haruo Shikanai died of acute liver failure at the age of 42. That same year, Hisashi Hieda, who had led Fuji Television's growth in tandem with Haruo Shikanai, was appointed President and CEO of Fuji Television.

Haruo Shikanai and Hisashi Hieda have also left a shining legacy in the history of Japanese Film. The 1983 film Antarctica, for which Haruo Shikanai served as Executive in Charge of Production and Hisashi Hieda as Executive Producer, attracted 12 million viewers in Japan and became the highest-grossing Japanese film at the time. This record remained unbroken until 1997 with the release of the animated film Princess Mononoke (directed by Hayao Miyazaki), and as a live-action film, until 2003 with the release of Bayside Shakedown 2 (produced by Fuji Television). The 1986 film The Adventures of Milo and Otis, for which Haruo Shikanai served as Executive Producer and Hisashi Hieda and Masaru Kakutani as Executive in Charge of Production, attracted approximately 7.5 million viewers and became the top-grossing domestic film of the year in Japan. It was released in North America in 1989, where it grossed a cumulative total of approximately $13.29 million. This record stood for 34 years as the highest-grossing Japanese live-action film in the U.S. until it was surpassed by Godzilla Minus One in 2023, which earned approximately $14.36 million.

In October 1989, Fujisankei paid former United States president Ronald Reagan $2 million to help the company with public relations. Reagan toured Japan for nine days and made two speeches.

In 1991, Fujisankei Group invested $50 million to establish "Fujisankei California Entertainment, Inc." in North America, with Masaru Kakutani, who had been involved in Antarctica and The Adventures of Milo and Otis, serving as president.

In July 2003, Hisashi Hieda assumed the position of Chairperson of Fujisankei Communications Group. In 2005, as part of restructuring the capital structure of the Fujisankei, Fuji Television launched a public tender offer for shares of Nippon Broadcasting System. During this process, Takafumi Horie's Livedoor attempted a hostile takeover of Nippon Broadcasting System, but ultimately gave up. Fuji Television, having achieved victory, made Nippon Broadcasting System a wholly owned subsidiary. In January 2006, Takafumi Horie was arrested on charges related to Livedoor's accounting fraud and was later sentenced to two years and six months in prison.

In 2008, Fuji Television, which had become the business holding company of the Fujisankei, transitioned to a pure holding company and changed its name to "Fuji Media Holdings, Inc.". The operational divisions of the former Fuji Television were succeeded by a newly established company also named "Fuji Television Network, Inc.". Hisashi Hieda became the Chairperson and CEO of both companies. Fuji Media Holdings, as Japan's first certified broadcasting holding company, became capable of having multiple broadcasting companies as its subsidiaries.

== Major companies ==
This is a partial list of the companies that constitute the Fujisankei Communications Group.

=== Fuji Media Holdings, Inc. ===
Fuji Media Holdings, Inc. (FMH) is a certified broadcasting holding company that oversees the Fujisankei Communications Group (FCG). Most of FCG falls under FMH, and it is positioned as a standalone entity within FCG. Sankei Shimbun Co., Ltd. is an affiliate of FMH, and Nippon Cultural Broadcasting, Inc. holds more than 3.3% of FMH's shares, making it a major shareholder.

=== Fuji Television Group (Fuji TV Group) ===
- Fuji Television Network, Inc. (Broadcasting, Film Production, Events, Contents Distribution)
- BS FUJI/Fuji Satellite Broadcasting Inc. (Broadcasting)
- Kyodo Television, Ltd. (Producing)
- FUJI CREATIVE CORPORATION (Producing)
- NEXTEP TV WORKSHOP Co., Ltd. (Producing)
- Fujiart, Inc. (Producing)
- Fuji Media Technology, Inc. (Producing)
- HOEI SERVICE INC. (Producing)
- DINOS CORPORATION (E-Commerce)
- Dinos Callcenter, Inc. (E-Commerce)
- imini immunity Co., Ltd. (Beauty & Cosmetic)
- KOMAINU, Inc. (WEB Marketing)
- FUJI ATETSU MULTIMEDIA INC. (Note: The company operates an e-commerce site in Taiwan called "fujidinos.") (E-Commerce in Taiwan)
- Quaras Inc. (Advertising Agency)
- Fujimic, Inc. (System Development)
- Fusosha Publishing Inc. (Publishing, Lifestyle Media, Journalism, Comics)
- Fujipacific Music Inc. (Global Music Publisher)
- Fuji Land, Inc. (Real Estate, Food & Restaurant)
- Fuji Career Design Inc. (Human Resource)
- Fuji Smart Work, Inc. (Human Resource)
- FCG Research Institute, Inc.
- Fuji Culture X, Inc. (Games, System Development)
- Satellite Service, Inc. (Broadcasting)
- Fujisankei Communications International, Inc. (Global)
- Fuji Music Group, Inc. (Global Music Publisher)
- DAIICHI-ONKYO, INC. (Sound Effects)
- Van Eight Productions, Inc. (Producing)
- Kyodo Edit, Inc. (Producing)
- Basis, Ltd. (Producing)
- VASC Co., Ltd. (Producing)
- PIXIS Technologies, Inc. (System Development)
- Fuji Plus, Inc. (Food & Restaurant)
- Fuji Consumer Products, Inc. (IP License)

=== Sankei News Media Group (Sankei Shimbun Group) ===
- Sankei Shimbun Co., Ltd. - Sankei Shimbun, (Note: Sankei Shimbun is one of Japan's five major national newspapers.) Sankei News, (Note: The Sankei News is one of the top-ranking news websites in Japan in terms of access.) Sankei Sports (Note: The Sankei Sports is a leading sports media outlet in Japan.) and The Seiron (Note: The Seiron is a major opinion magazine in Japan.)
- Japan Industries Journal Co., Ltd.
- Sankei Editing Center Co., Ltd.
- Sankei Shimbun Publications, Inc.
- Ushioshobo Kojinshinsha Publications, Inc.
- Sankei System Development, Inc.
- Kansoku, Inc.
- Sankei Shimbun Kaihatsu, Inc. (Tokyo)
- Sankei Shimbun Kaihatsu, Inc. (Osaka)
- Sankei Shimbun Tokyo Marketing, Inc.
- Sankei Shimbun Osaka Marketing, Inc.
- Sankei Shimbun Editorial, Inc.
- The Sankei Shimbun Printing, Inc.
- Sankei Sogo Printing, Inc.
- Sankei Research & Date, Inc.
- Sankei Digital, Inc.
- Sankei Advertising, Inc.
- Sankei Ads, Inc.
- Sankei Eye, Inc.
- Osaka Broadcasting Corporation (RADIO OSAKA)
- JAPAN-Forward Association

=== Nippon Broadcasting Group (Nippon Hoso Group) ===
- Nippon Broadcasting System, Inc. (Broadcasting, Information, Events)
- Nippon Broadcasting ProjActs, Inc. (Advertising Agency, Leasing, Other)
- Fujisankei Agency, Inc. (Commerce, Insurance Agency, Other)
- Mixzone, Inc. (Radio Program Production)
- Grape Co., Ltd. (Digital Media)

=== Sankei Building Group ===
- The Sankei Building Co., Ltd. (Urban Development, Hotels & Resorts)
- GRANVISTA Hotels & Resorts Co., Ltd. (Hotels & Resorts)
- Sankei Building Asset Management Co., Ltd. (Investment Advisory/J-REIT)
- Sankei Kaikan Co., Ltd. (Restaurant)
- Sankei Bldg Techno Co., Ltd.
- Sankei Bldg Management Co., Ltd.
- Sankei Building Maintenance Service Co., Ltd.
- BREEZÉ ARTS Co., Ltd.
- Sankei Building Well Care Co., Ltd.
- VISAHO JOINT STOCK COMPANY Co., Ltd. (Vietnam)

=== Pony Canyon Group ===
- Pony Canyon, Inc. (Film, Music, Events, Community Revitalization)
- Ponycanyon Music Publishing Inc. (Music Publisher)
- EMP Inc. (Music Production, Back Office)
- PCI Music Inc. (Music Distribution)
- STYRISM INC. (Artists Management)
- Dream Studio Company, Inc. (Events)
- PONYCANYON USA INC.
- PONYCANYON ENTERTAINMENT (TAIWAN) INC.
- Memory-Tech Holdings Inc. (Disk Media)

=== QR Group (Bunka Hoso Group) ===
- Nippon Cultural Broadcasting, Inc.
- JAPAN CENTRAL MUSIC, LTD.
- BUNKAHOSO KAIHATSU CENTER Inc.
- Nippon Cultural Broadcasting Media Bridge Inc.

=== Art & Culture Group (Public-interest Corporations Group) ===
- The Hakone Open-Air Museum
- The Utsukushi-ga-hara Open-air Museum
- CHOKOKU-NO-MORI ART FOUNDATION (operates two open-air museum)
- The Ueno Royal Museum
- The Japan Art Association (operates The Ueno Royal Museum & Praemium Imperiale)
- Sankei Shimbun Public Welfare Organization
