= Sankei Sports =

Daily sports newspaper

The Sankei Sports
- Type: Daily newspaper
- Format: Broadsheet
- Owner(s): Sankei Shimbun Co., Ltd.
- Founded: 1955
- Language: Japanese
- Headquarters: Tokyo & Osaka
- Website: www.sanspo.com

Sankei Sports (サンケイスポーツ, Sankei Supōtsu) is a Japanese-language daily sports newspaper published by Sankei Shimbun. In 2014, it had a circulation of 1,270,000. The newspaper is known by its nickname Sanspo (サンスポ, San-Supo).

== See also ==
- Fujisankei Communications Group
- Japanese media
