= Shigeki Abe =

Japanese baseball player (born 1972)

- Catcher
- Born: July 5, 1972 (age 53); Ogata, Akita
- Bats: Right Throws: Right
- Stats at Baseball Reference

Teams
- Yomiuri Giants (1991–1997); Yakult Swallows (1998–2001)

Shigeki Abe (阿部 茂樹, Abe Shigeki; born July 5, 1972 in Ogata, Akita) is a retired Nippon Professional Baseball player. He played for the Yakult Swallows in 1999.
