= Osamu Abe =

Osamu Abe may refer to:

- Osamu Abe (baseball) (安部 理, born 1962), Japanese baseball player and coach
- Osamu Abe (rower) (安部 収, 1913–?), Japanese rower
