= Hisashi Matsuda =

Japanese physicist known for his work in ion optics and mass spectrometry

- Born: February 3, 1924; Osaka
- Died: November 13, 2011 (aged 87)
- Education: Osaka University
- Scientific career
- Fields: optics and mass spectrometry
- Workplaces: Osaka University
- Doctoral advisor: Koreichi Ogata

Hisashi Matsuda (松田 久; 2 March 1924 - 13 November 2011) was a Japanese physicist known for his work in ion optics and mass spectrometry, specifically known for his contributions to instrument design.

== Career and research ==
Matsuda was born in Osaka and studied physics and mathematics at Osaka University, receiving a PhD in 1957 from Osaka University for his thesis on mass spectrometry under Koreichi Ogata. He started as assistant professor in 1955 and become associate professor in 1959 and full professor 1963 at Osaka University. His career was devoted to mass spectrometry, developing novel ion optics and improving resolving power. In 1956 he constructed the Ogata–Matsuda type instrument with a mass resolution of 900,000 which was the highest resolution worldwide. He constructed mass spectrometers suited for analysis of large biomolecules and was one of the first to realize the implications of mass spectrometry on the analysis of peptides and proteins. He retired in 1987.

He was awarded several prizes for his work, including the Nishina Memorial Prize in 1969 and the Toray Science and Technology Prize in 1982. He received the Thomson medal from the International Mass Spectrometry Society in 1991 and the Order of the Rising Sun, Gold Rays with a Neck Ribbon in spring 2002.
