= Ueno Royal Museum =

Art museum in Tokyo, Japan

The Ueno Royal Museum
- 上野の森美術館
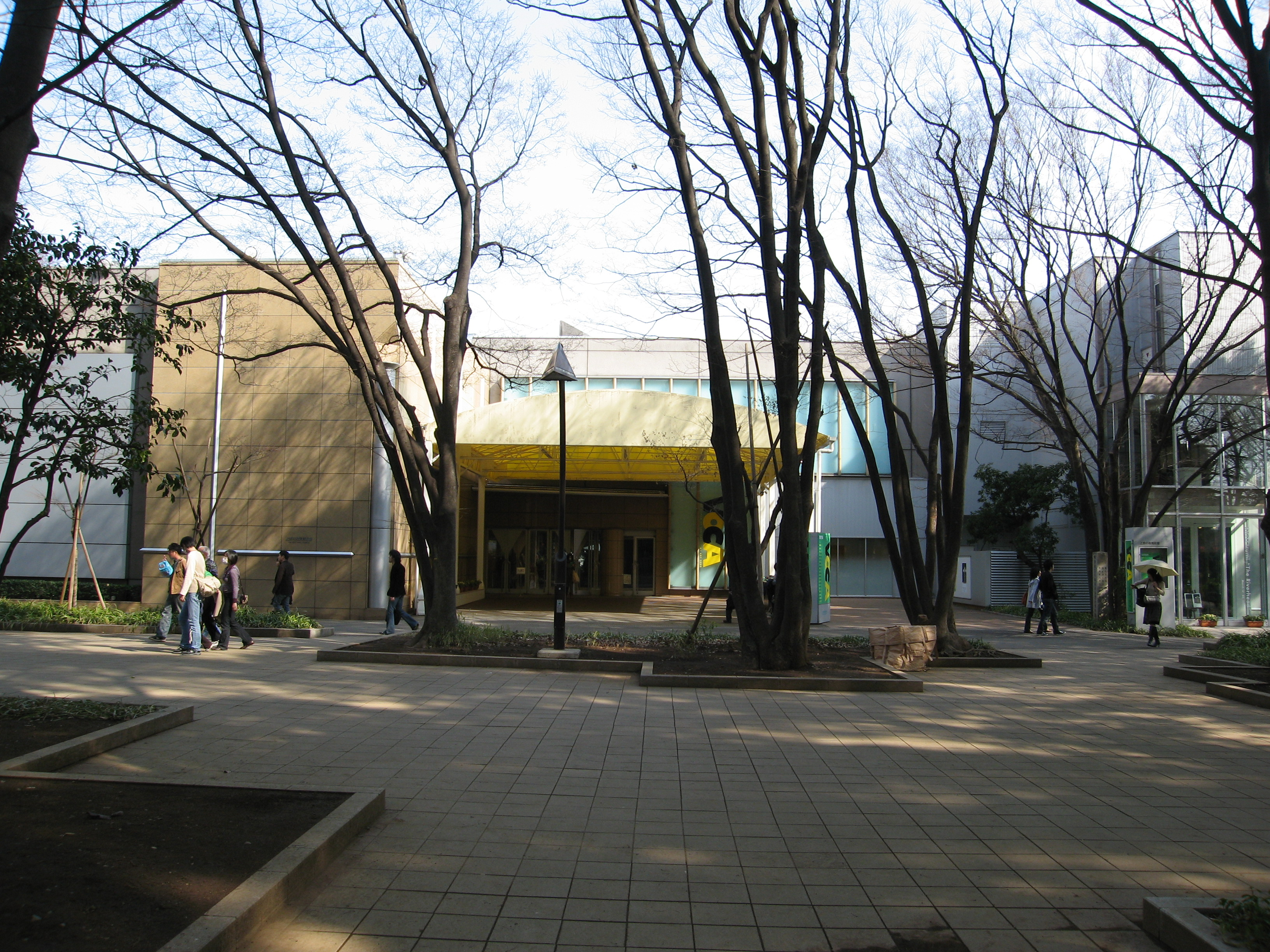

- Location within Tokyo Yamanote Loop Location within Tokyo wards area
- Established: April 1972
- Location: 1-2 Ueno Park, Taitō, Tokyo, Japan
- Coordinates: 35°42′46″N 139°46′29″E
- Website: Official website

The Ueno Royal Museum (上野の森美術館, Ueno-no-Mori Bijutsukan) opened in Ueno Park, Taitō, Tokyo, Japan, in 1972. Owned by Fujisankei Communications Group and managed by the Japan Art Association, the museum focuses on contemporary art with exhibitions including the regular Ueno Royal Museum Grand Prize Exhibition and Japanese Nature Painting Exhibition (日本の自然を描く展), as well special exhibitions from overseas.

== See also ==
- List of museums in Tokyo
