= Hiroshi Abe =

Hiroshi Abe is the name of:

== People ==
- Hiroshi Abe (actor) (阿部 寛; born 1964), Japanese model and actor
- Hiroshi Abe (astronomer) (安部 裕史; born 1958), Japanese amateur astronomer affiliated with the Yatsuka Observatory
- Hiroshi Abe (officer) (c. 1922–?), former Japanese army officer
- Hiroshi Abe, Governor of Tokyo before and after World War I

== Fictional characters ==
- Hiroshi Abe (阿部 寛), a character in the manga series Shonan Junai Gumi
