= David Abe =

American electrical engineer

- Education: Harvey Mudd College; University of California, Davis; University of Maryland
- Known for: Vacuum electronics, pulsed power, high power micro-wave generation, and electromagnetic effects
- Scientific career
- Fields: Electromagnetics
- Institutions: U.S. Naval Research Laboratory

Notes
- Fellow of the Institute of Electrical and Electronics Engineers (IEEE), 2015

David Kazuo Abe is the head of the Electromagnetics Technology Branch at the U.S. Naval Research Laboratory and was named Fellow of the Institute of Electrical and Electronics Engineers (IEEE) in 2015 for leadership and contributions to the development of high power microwave and millimeter wave vacuum electronic devices.

== Education ==
Abe completed his Bachelor of Science degree in engineering from Harvey Mudd College in 1981, a Master of Science in electrical engineering from the University of California, Davis in 1988 and a doctorate in electrophysics from the University of Maryland in 1992.

== Career ==
Abe worked on interdisciplinary projects in pulsed power, electromagnetic effects and high power micro-wave generation at the Berkeley Research Associates, Lawrence Livermore National Laboratory, and the U.S. Army Research Laboratory. In 1996, Abe joined the U.S. Naval Research Laboratory.

== Awards ==
- 2014 Top Scientist and Engineer of the Year Award (June 12, 2014).
