= Hisashi Okuyama =

Japanese poet (born 1941)

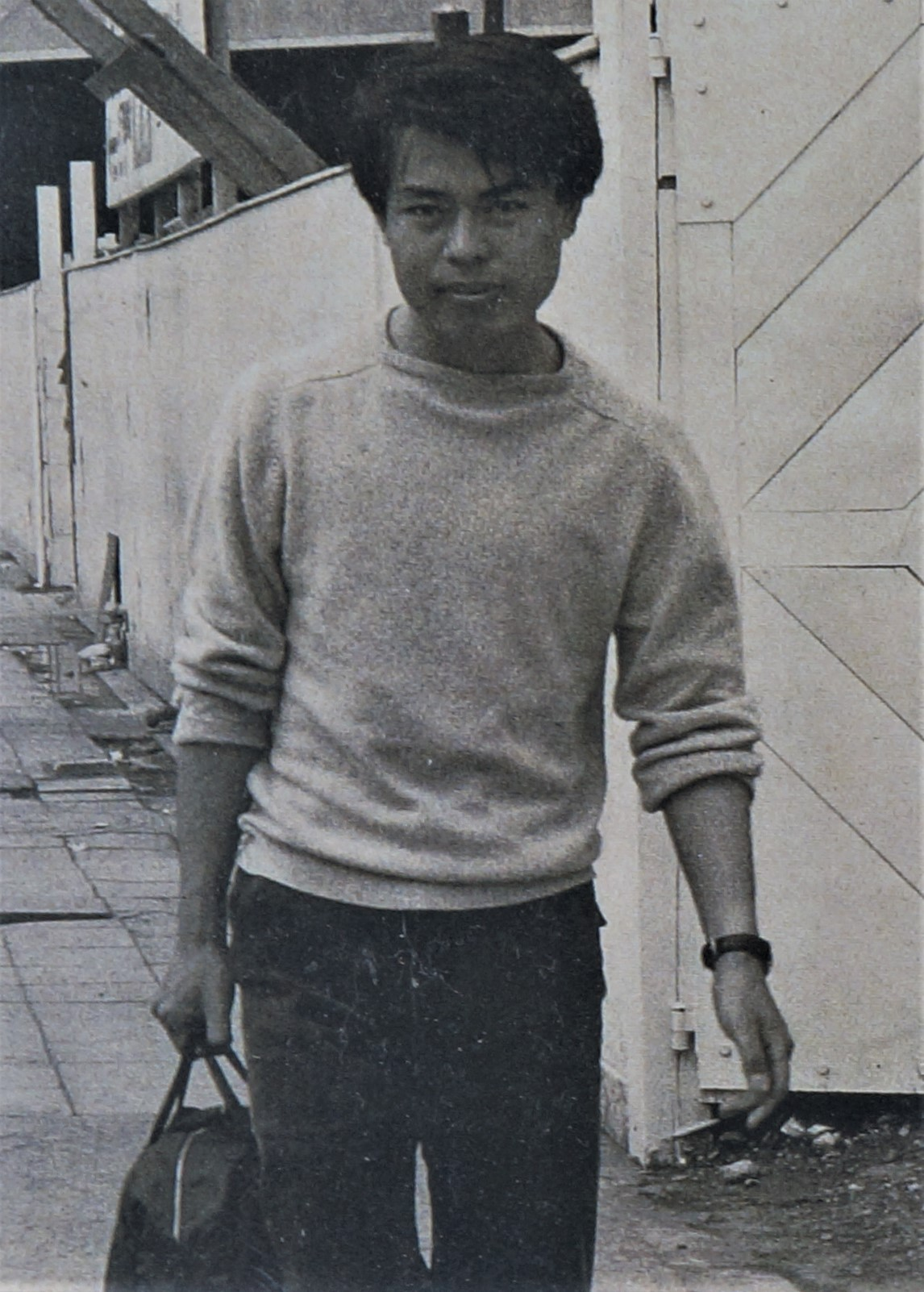
Image of Okuyama

Hisashi Okuyama (born 1941 in Japan) is a Japanese poet who has lived in France since the 1970s.

== Works ==
- Olla cineraria, 1998
- Percussif|année, 1999
- L'autoportrait aux chardons, 2000
- Volute de chute, 2004
- Cambrure|année, 2005
- Arrache alu pour deux voix, 2006
- Bouteille blanche : pour deux voix, 2006
- Ce retardement pour voix seule, 2006
- L'hiver le 24 janvier 1743, 2008, Æncrages & Co
- Le Jardin des Fugues, 2008, éditions Mémoire Vivante
- Sept neiges pour une partita, 2010, éditions Mémoire Vivante
