= Hiroyuki Abe =

Hiroyuki Abe may refer to:

- Hiroyuki Abe (fighter) (born 1970), Japanese mixed martial artist
- Hiroyuki Abe (footballer) (born 1989), Japanese football player
- Hiroyuki Abe (table tennis), Japanese table tennis international
- Hiroyuki Abe, a Japanese politician
