= Matsuoka Hisashi =

Japanese painter

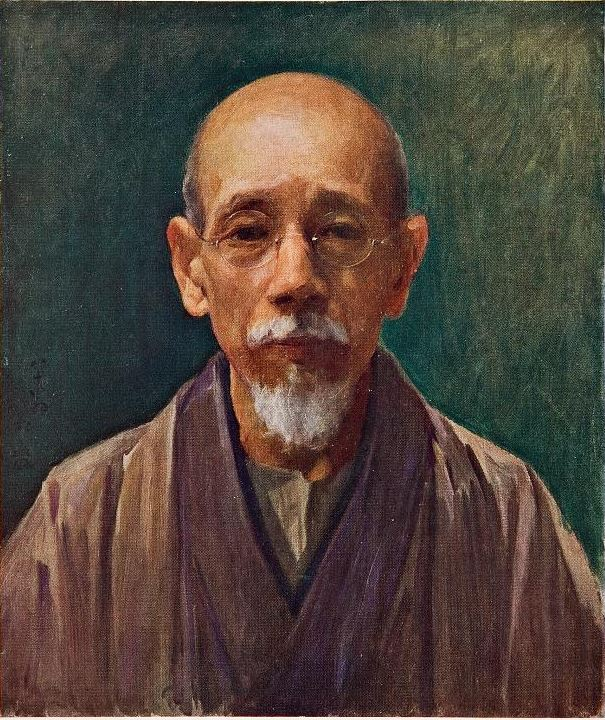
Self-portrait (1941)

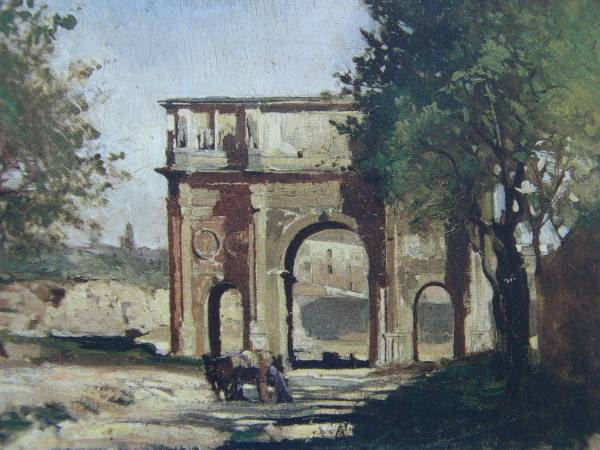
An Old Arch in Rome

Matsuoka Hisashi (松岡 寿, 5 March 1862, Okayama Prefecture – 28 April 1944, Tokyo) was a Japanese painter in the yōga style.

== Life and work ==
His father was a member of the samurai class. In 1872, his family moved to Tokyo. At the age of barely ten, he was already creating Western-style paintings. In 1876, he was enrolled at the new Technical Fine Arts School ((now the Tokyo Institute of Technology), operated by the Ministry of Industry, where he studied for two years under the Italian artist, Antonio Fontanesi. When Fontanesi returned to Italy in 1878, he and several other students including Asai Chū, were unhappy with his replacement and left the school to create their own group, the "Association of the Eleventh" (十一次会), so called because that was the eleventh year of the Meiji era. It was Japan's first modern art association.

In 1880, he went to Italy to continue his education. He initially worked with Cesare Maccari then, in 1881, entered a free school associated with the Accademia di Belle Arti di Roma. Two years later, he was granted admission to the school itself. He graduated there in 1887. Before returning to Japan, he spent some time in Paris.

Once there, he and his old associate, Asai Chū (and others) established the Meiji Art Association). After that, he devoted himself almost exclusively to training young artists; teaching at several institutions, including the Imperial Japanese Army Academy, the Faculty of Architecture at Tokyo University as well as at the Meiji Association school.

In 1921, he was named President of the Tokyo Art School, the precursor to the Tokyo University of the Arts. He also served as a juror at several state exhibitions, notably the Ministry of Education Exhibition. After 1935, he turned to creating large scale historical paintings.

== Sources ==
- Japan Foundation: "Matsuoka". In: Japanische Malerei im westlichen Stil (exhibition catalog), Museum für Ostasiatische Kunst, Cologne, 1985.
- Tazawa, Yutaka: "Matsuoka Hisashi". In: Biographical Dictionary of Japanese Art. Kodansha International, 1981. ISBN 0-87011-488-3.
- Laurance P. Roberts: "Matsuoka Hisashi". In: A Dictionary of Japanese Artists. Weatherhill, 1976. ISBN 0-8348-0113-2.
