= Kohki Abe =

Japanese human rights professor and activist

- 阿部 浩己
- Born: 1958 (age 67–68)
- Education: Waseda University
- Known for: contributions to the spread of human rights in Japan
- Scientific career
- Fields: Human rights

Kohki Abe (阿部 浩己, Abe Kōki; born 1958) is a Japanese human rights professor and activist. He is dean at Meiji Gakuin University in Japan.

== Biographical sketch ==
Kohki Abe obtained his doctoral degree from Waseda University in Japan. Subsequently, he obtained an LL.M from the University of Virginia School of Law and was a visiting professor at the Centre for Refugee Studies in York University, Canada. As of July 2008 he is dean of the law school at Kanagawa University in Yokohama, Japan, where he teaches international law, human rights and refugee law. He is a board member of both the Japanese Society of International Human Rights Law, and the Japanese Civil Liberties Union. He also is president of the Tokyo-based NGO Human Rights Now.

== Works by Kohki Abe ==
- "The World and Japan as viewed by refugees"『難民からみる世界と日本』1998
- "The Globalisation of Human Rights - The Challenge of International Human Rights Law"『人権の国際化―国際人権法の挑戦』1998
- "UNHCR Committee Execution - The Conclusions on the international protection of refugees"『UNHCR執行委員会・難民の国際的保護に関する結論（選集）』1999
- "Convention against Torture - International Standards created by NGO's"『拷問等禁止条約-NGOが創った国際基準』2000
- "One Century International Law in Japan"『日本と国際法の100年第4巻 人権』2001
- "International Human Rights Textbook"『テキストブック国際人権法［第2版］』2002
- "Interpreting International Law using Data"『資料で読み解く国際法［第2版］』2002
- "The Horizon of International Human Rights"『国際人権の地平』2003
- "Introductory Colloquy on Gender Law"『導入対話によるジェンダー法学』2003
- "Introduction to the Ultramodern Study of Law"『ブリッジブック先端法学入門』2003
