= Mikishi Abe =

Japanese architect

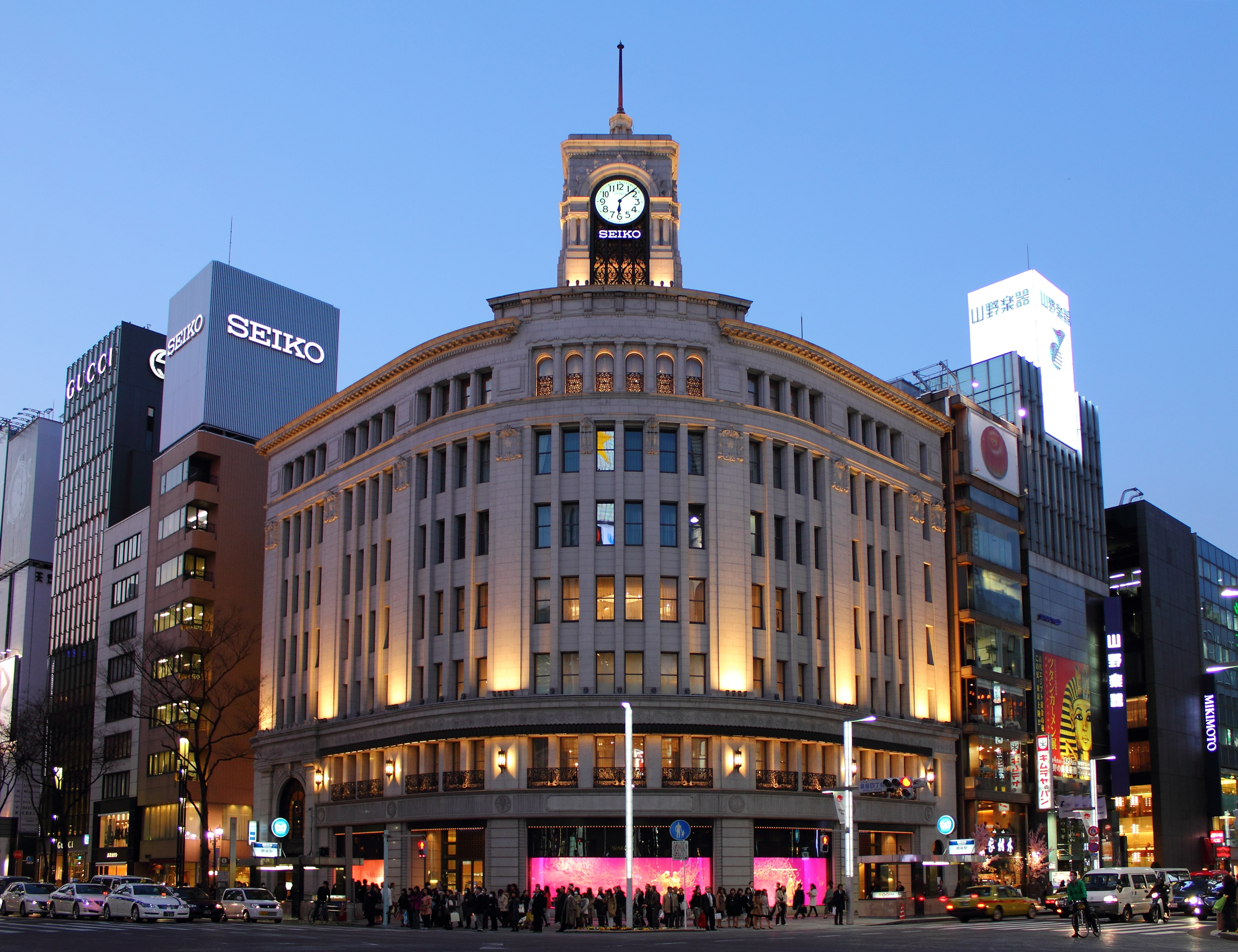
- SEIKO main office designed by Mikishi Abe
- Born: May 4, 1883; Iwate Prefecture Japan
- Died: February 20, 1965
- Education: University of Illinois; Sapporo Agricultural College
- Occupations: Architect, civil engineer
- Practice: Abe Offices
- Buildings: Hankyu Department Store Hibiya Movie Theatre; Yuraku-za (Theatre); Kobe Hankyu Building Naigai Building
- Projects: Hankyu Hanshin Toho Group overhead railways

Mikishi Abe (阿部 美樹志, Abe Mikishi; 1883–1965) was a Japanese architect and civil engineer, known for his PhD thesis on reinforced concrete frames, and for several concrete buildings. Abe was responsible for designing the first elevated railway using reinforced concrete. He contributed to many architectural and engineering works of the Hankyu Hanshin Toho Group.

Shortly after World War Two, he was the second president of the War Reconstruction Agency (currently the Ministry of Land, Infrastructure, Transport and Tourism) and the Secretary-General of the Construction Agency (Deputy Secretary of Construction) after the war. On March 4, 1947, he was appointed as a member of the Imperial House of Representatives, and remained in office until the abolition of the House of Peers on May 2, the same year.

Mikishi Abe was the student of A.N Talbot of United States. He is credited of spreading the Talbot's message of pragmatism in Japan.

== Buildings ==
- Seiko Main Office
- Hibiya Movie Theater, Yurakucho, Chiyodaku, Tokyo, 1934
- Meiji Seika Tobata Factory, Tobataku, KitaKyushu, 1936
- Hankyu Nishinomiya Stadium
- Kobe Hankyu Building
- Yuraku-za Theatre
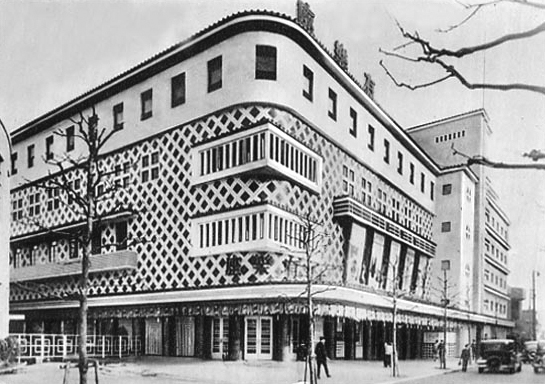
Yūraku-za Theatre

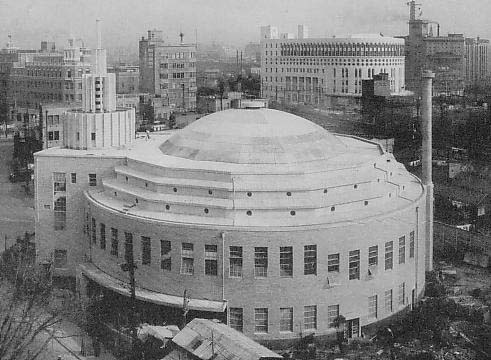
Hibiya Movie Theatre

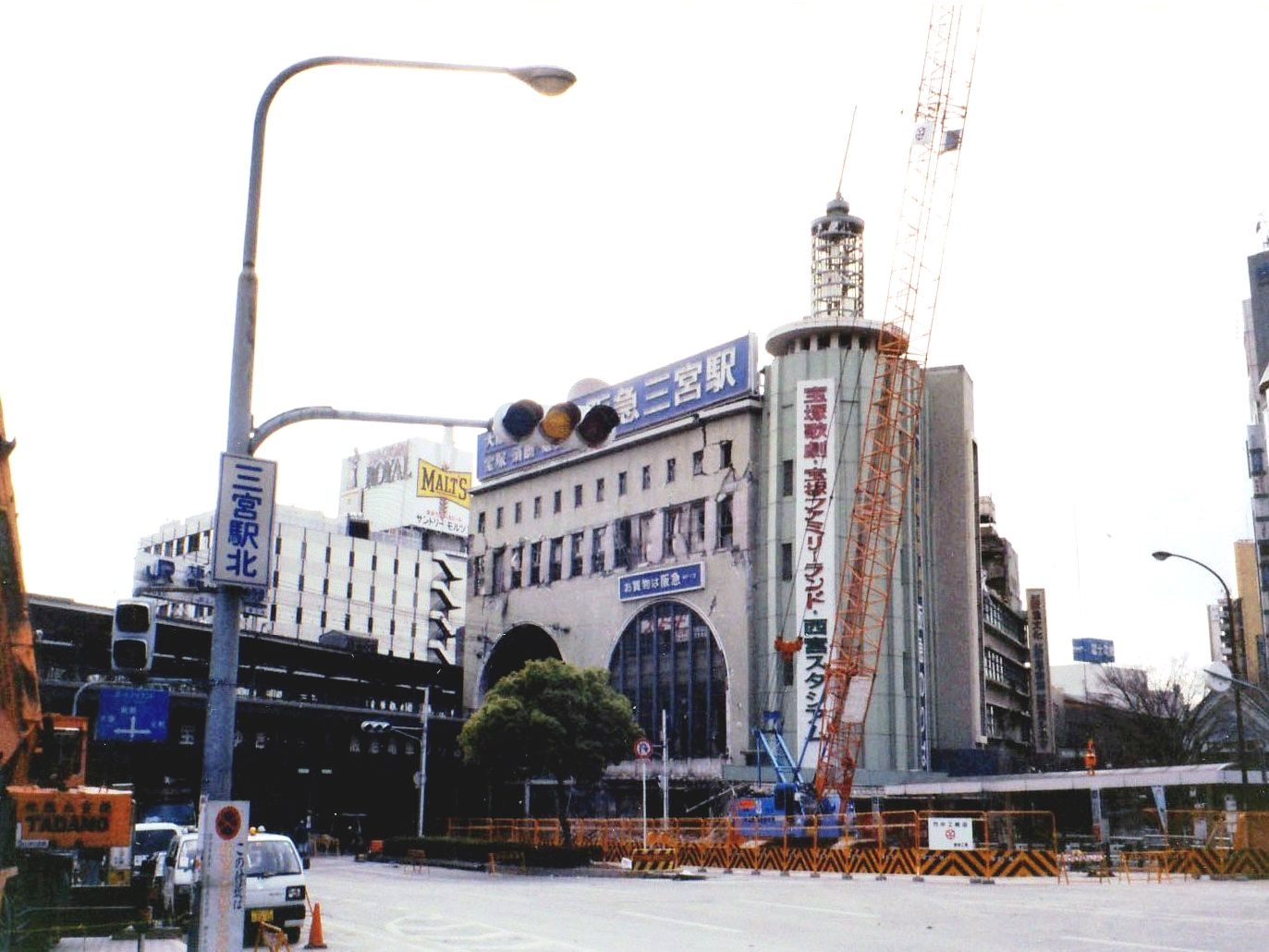
Original Kobe Hankyu Building

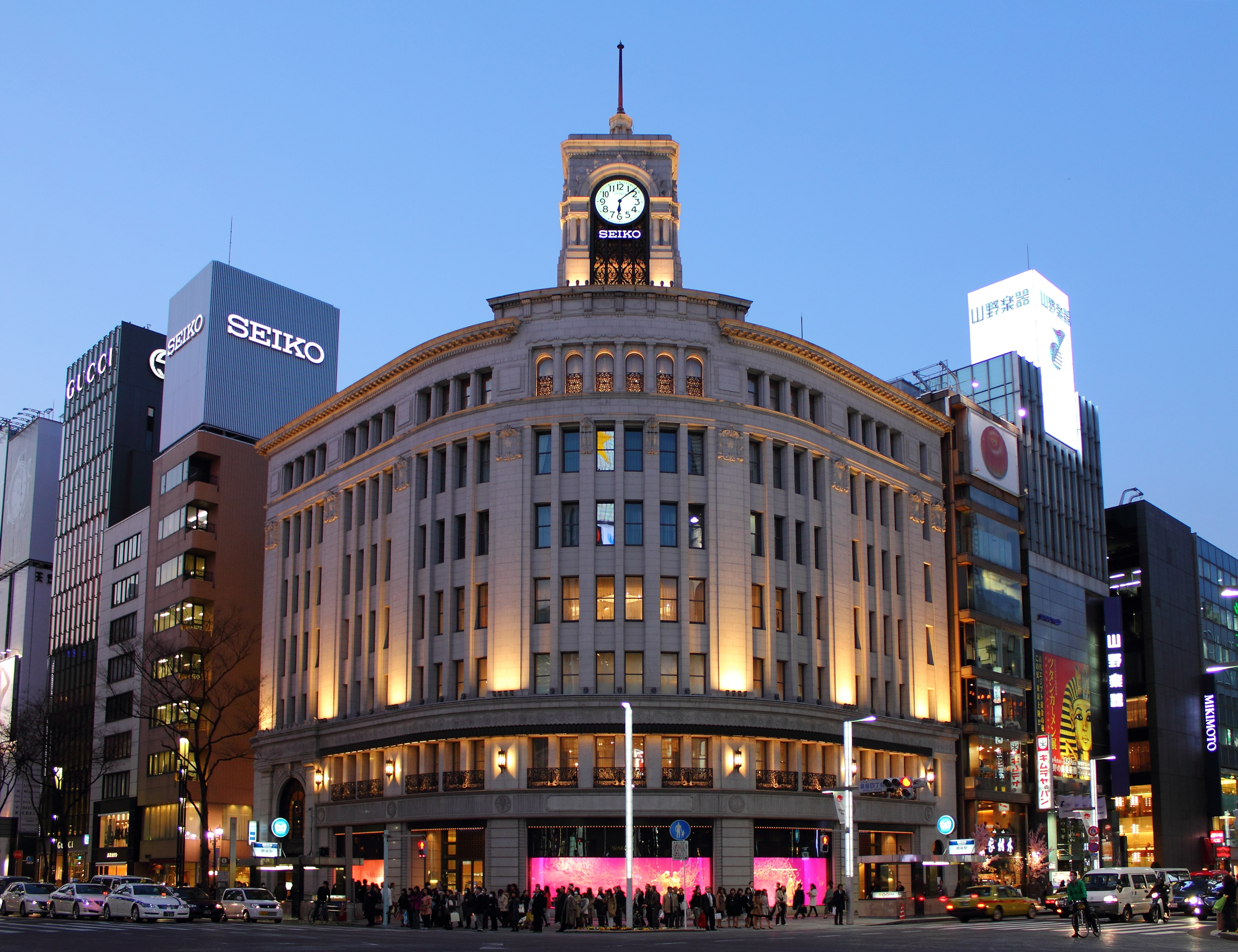
SEIKO main office in Ginza, Tokyo

== Books ==
- Analysis and Tests of Rigidly Connected Reinforced Concrete Frames.
