= Japan Art Association =

The Japan Art Association (Japanese: 公益財団法人日本美術協会, Nihon Bijutsu Kyōkai) is a Japanese art organization, whose origins trace to Ryuchikai (龍池会), founded in 1879 during the Meiji period. Reorganized under imperial patronage in the late 1880s, the Association promoted exhibitions and publications, later establishing the Ueno Royal Museum, Today, it organizes the Praemium Imperiale and is affiliated with the Fujisankei Communications Group, a major Japanese media conglomerate.

== History ==
The Ryuchikai side, which felt a sense of crisis about the reform movement of the Kangakai, deepened its relationship with the Imperial Household Ministry, and in 1887 (Meiji 20), it was renamed the 'Japan Art Association' with Prince Arisugawa Taruhito as president. Under the policy of preserving pure traditional paintings, heavyweights of the traditional painting school gathered, and it was called the old school, while the reformist school of the Kangakai system was called the new school.

In 1888 (Meiji 21), it launched a newsletter, 'Report of the Japan Art Association' and in the same year it was certified as 'Imperial Household Craftsman', the predecessor of the Imperial Household Artist . It rented the site of the Imperial Household Agency in Ueno Park, built a hall, and held art exhibitions there. Thanks to the influence of having a member of the imperial family as president, the number of members continued to increase from 478 in 1888 when it was founded, reaching 1,560 at its peak in December 1903. Membership remained high until 1917. This period overlapped with the predicament of the early Nihon Bijutsuin and the Bunten period, when the old and new schools clashed violently.

However, the Japan Art Association did not simply adhere to tradition. Looking at its actual works, from the 1900s onwards, there are also works that give a clearer image overall and a modern sensibility that is not bound by traditional screen composition. In the 1930s, the number of the kanji characters for the titles of paintings, which connects zu, began to decrease gradually until they were no longer be attached [1] . However, the change without changing the essential attitude of clinging to the glories of the past was an act that lost the significance of its existence as a national traditional conservative. Eventually, the talented young painters of the association gave up on the association and shifted the focus of their activities to the Bunten. The number of members is on the decline, and the purchase of artworks by the Imperial Household Agency is rapidly declining. The drastic decrease in purchases by the Imperial Household Agency is thought to be due to the switch to a policy of collecting exhibits with historical significance, focusing on the promotion of fine arts, rather than daily-use furnishings suitable for floor scrolls. It shows that Japanese painting has completely lost its position as the mainstream of the art world . [2]

The Japan Art Association ceased operations during World War II, but resumed its activities after the war and built an exhibition facility. This is the current Ueno Royal Museum.

— Excerpt from Harukaze Shimizu's "Tokyo Famous Hyakunin Isshu" August 1907 "Japan Art Association" [3]

== Past presidents ==
Prince Arisugawa Taruhito Prince Arisugawa Takehito Prince Kuninomiya Kunihiko Takamatsunomiya Imperial Prince Nobuhito Hitachinomiya Imperial Prince Masahito Major writer Takiwatei Kagetoshi Imao Yuki Sugitani Juune Araki

References Toshiyuki Okuma, "Nihonga by the Japan Art Association in the 30s and 40s of the Meiji Era" (edited by the Sannomaru Shozokan Exhibition Catalog No. 11, Rediscovering Meiji Art 3: The Road to Modern Japanese Painting, Meiji 30s-) Early Taisho Period, Kikuha Cultural Association, March 1996, pp. 4–6)
