= Sapporo Grand Hotel =

Hotel in Japan

Coordinates: 43°03′46″N 141°21′01″E

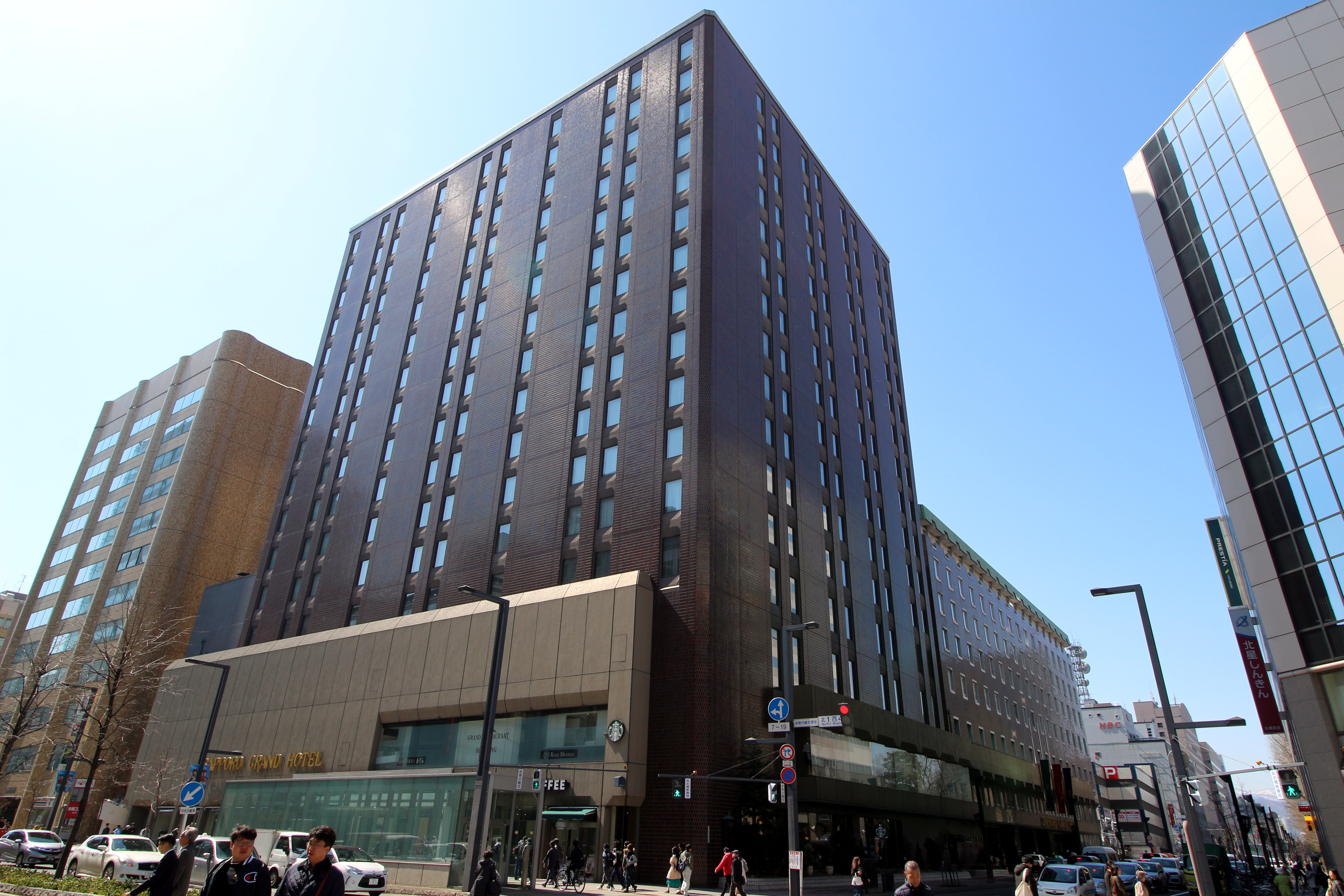
The Sapporo Grand Hotel

The Sapporo Grand Hotel is an historic hotel in the Chūō district of Sapporo, Japan.

== History ==
The hotel is said to have been constructed at Prince Chichibu's suggestion in 1928 - while he was on a skiing trip, he suggested that the city needed a western-style hotel.

The Grand Hotel first opened its doors in 1934 and was at the time of its construction the tallest building in the city. It benefited considerably from the Japanese Imperial Army's decision to use that part of Hokkaidō for military maneuvers during the 1930s.

After World War II, the hotel was requisitioned by the U.S. Army and only reopened in 1952. The original building was demolished in 1973 and replaced by a seventeen-story building whose construction was completed in 1976.
