= Kazunari Abe =

Japanese baseball player

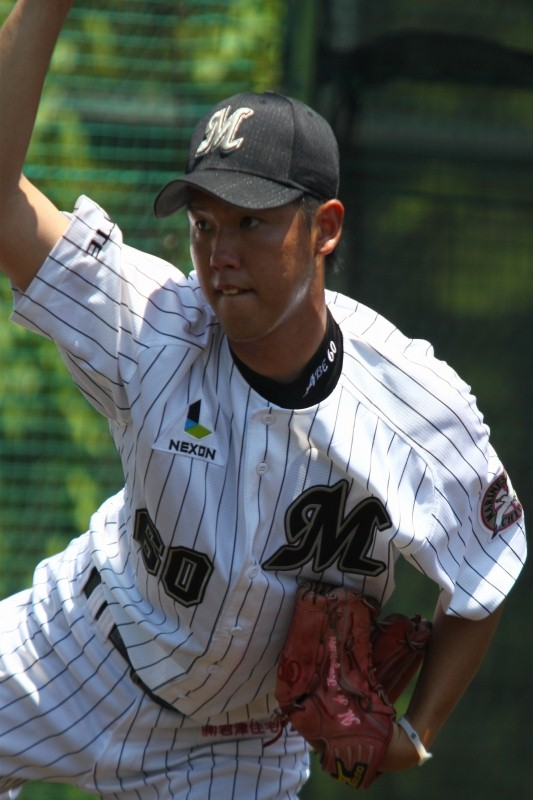
- Abe with the Chiba Lotte Marines
- Pitcher
- Born: May 19, 1989 (age 36)
- Bats: Right Throws: Right

NPB debut
- September 17, 2011, for the Chiba Lotte Marines

NPB statistics (through 2019 season)
- Win–loss record: 3–6
- ERA: 4.92
- Strikeouts: 38
- Stats at Baseball Reference

Teams
- Chiba Lotte Marines (2011–2013, 2015–2019)

Kazunari Abe (阿部 和成, Abe Kazunari; born May 19, 1989) is a Japanese former professional baseball pitcher in Japan's Nippon Professional Baseball. He played with the Chiba Lotte Marines from 2011 to 2013 and from 2015 to 2019.
