= Tadatoshi Abe =

Japanese field hockey player

Personal information
- Nationality: Japanese
- Born: 24 December 1931 Osaka Prefecture, Japan
- Height: 1.70 m (5 ft 7 in)
- Weight: 60 kg (130 lb)

Sport
- Sport: Field hockey

Tadatoshi Abe (安倍 忠俊, Abe Tadatoshi; born 24 December 1931) is a Japanese field hockey player. He competed in the 1960 Summer Olympics.
