= Hakone Open-Air Museum =

Museum in Japan

- 箱根 彫刻の森美術館
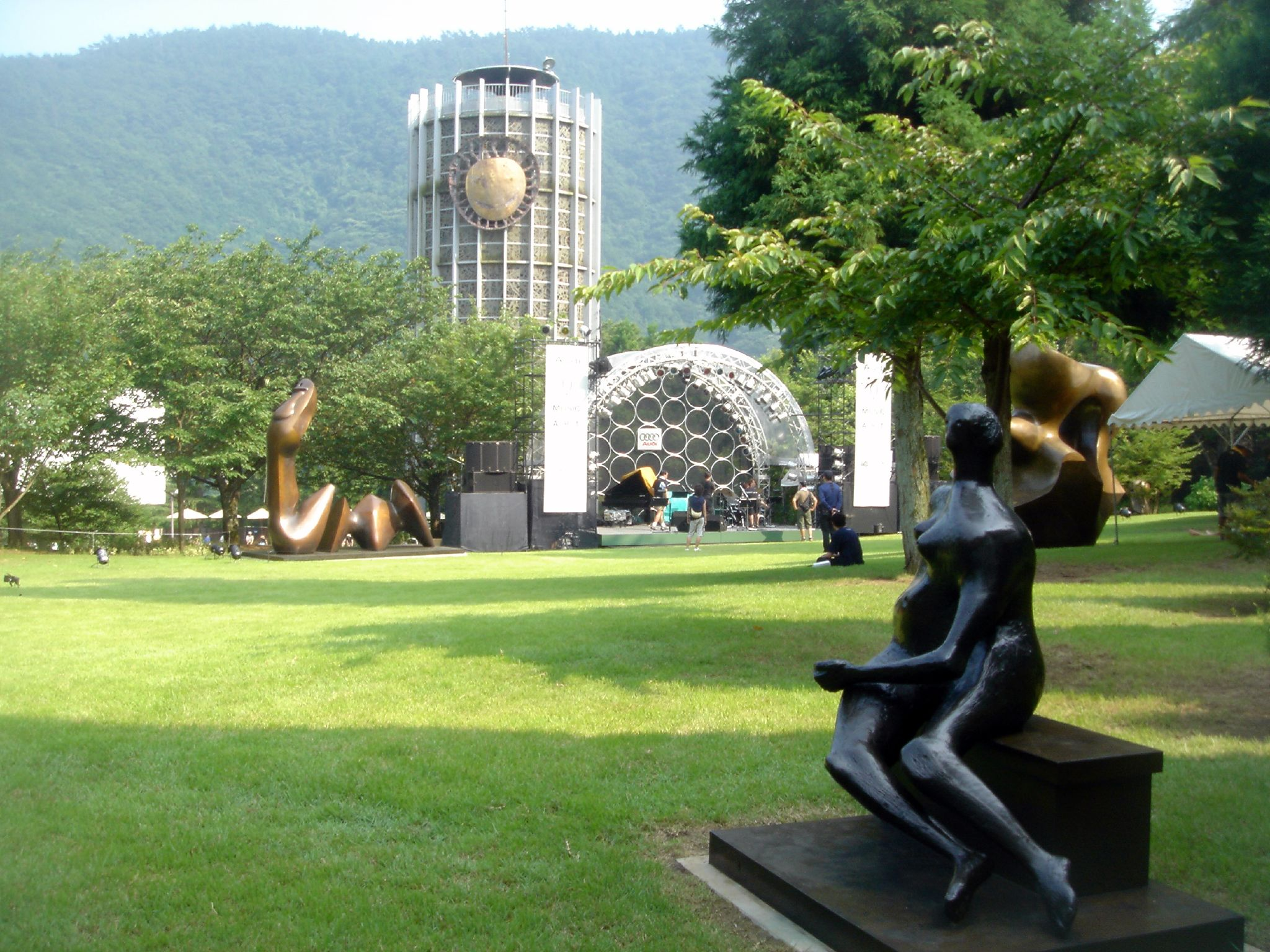
- Hakone Open-Air Museum
- Interactive fullscreen map
- Established: 1969
- Location: Hakone, Japan
- Coordinates: 35°14′41″N 139°3′5″E
- Type: Art museum
- Website: hakone-oam.or.jp

The Hakone Open-Air Museum (箱根 彫刻の森美術館, Hakone Choukoku no Mori Bijutsukan), opened in 1969, is Japan's first open-air museum. It is located in Hakone, Ashigarashimo District, Kanagawa Prefecture. Hosting over 1,000 pieces, it includes artworks by Pablo Picasso, Henry Moore, Taro Okamoto, Yasuo Mizui, Churyo Sato, Susumu Shingu, Constantin Brâncuși, Barbara Hepworth, Rokuzan Ogiwara, and Kōtarō Takamura, among others. About 120 sculptural works are on permanent display across the park. The museum is affiliated with the Fujisankei Communications Group media conglomerate.

Hakone Choukoku no Mori Bijutsukan is split into five indoor exhibitions and is best known for the Picasso Pavilion hall, containing around 300 of the Spanish artist's works. The museum also offers outdoor interactive sculptures for children and a naturally fed onsen footbath for guests.

== Gallery ==
=== Sculpture park and gardens ===
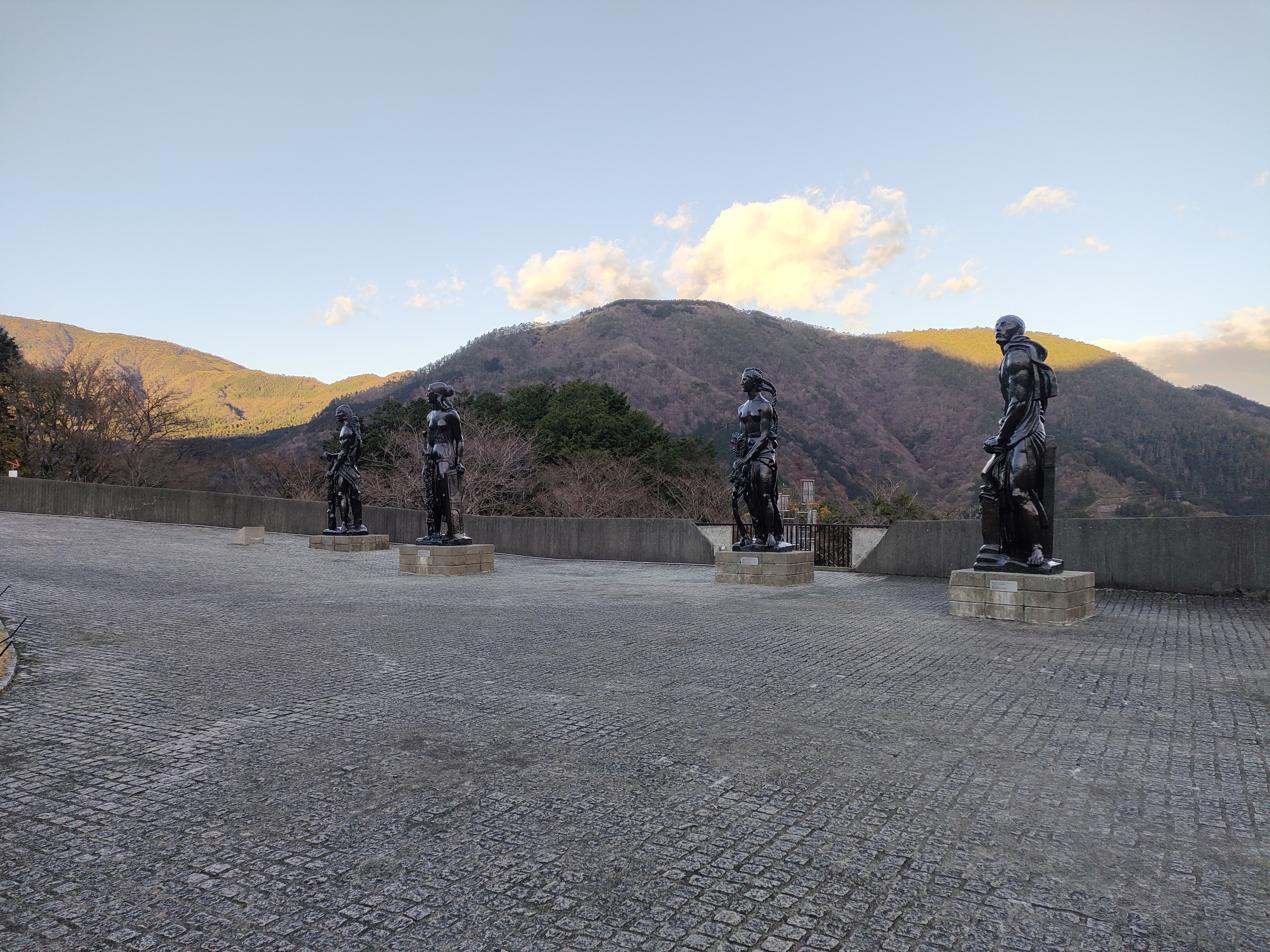
Exterior park view

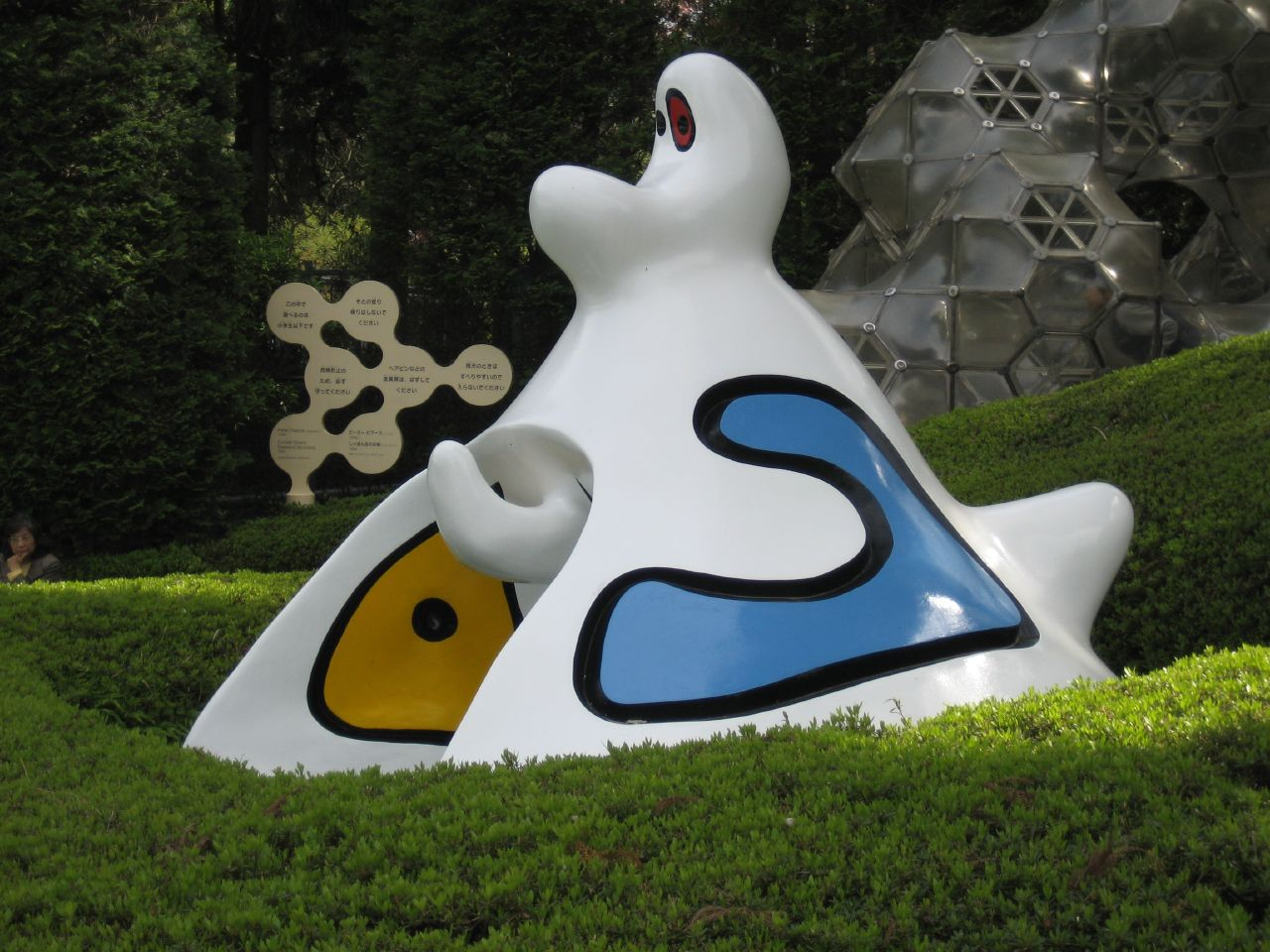
Joan Miró, 1972, Personnage

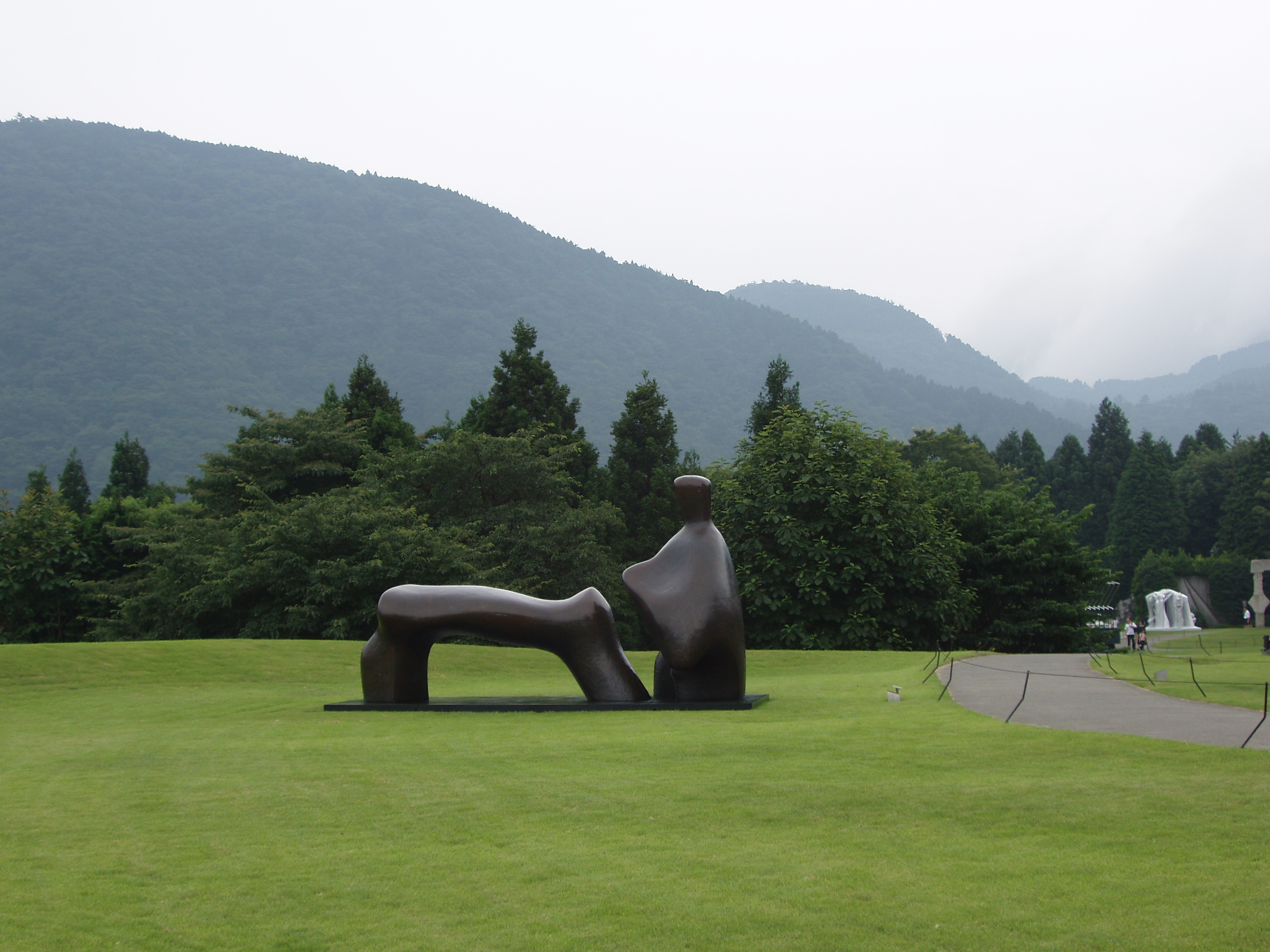
Henry Moore, 1969–70, Reclining Figure: Arched Leg

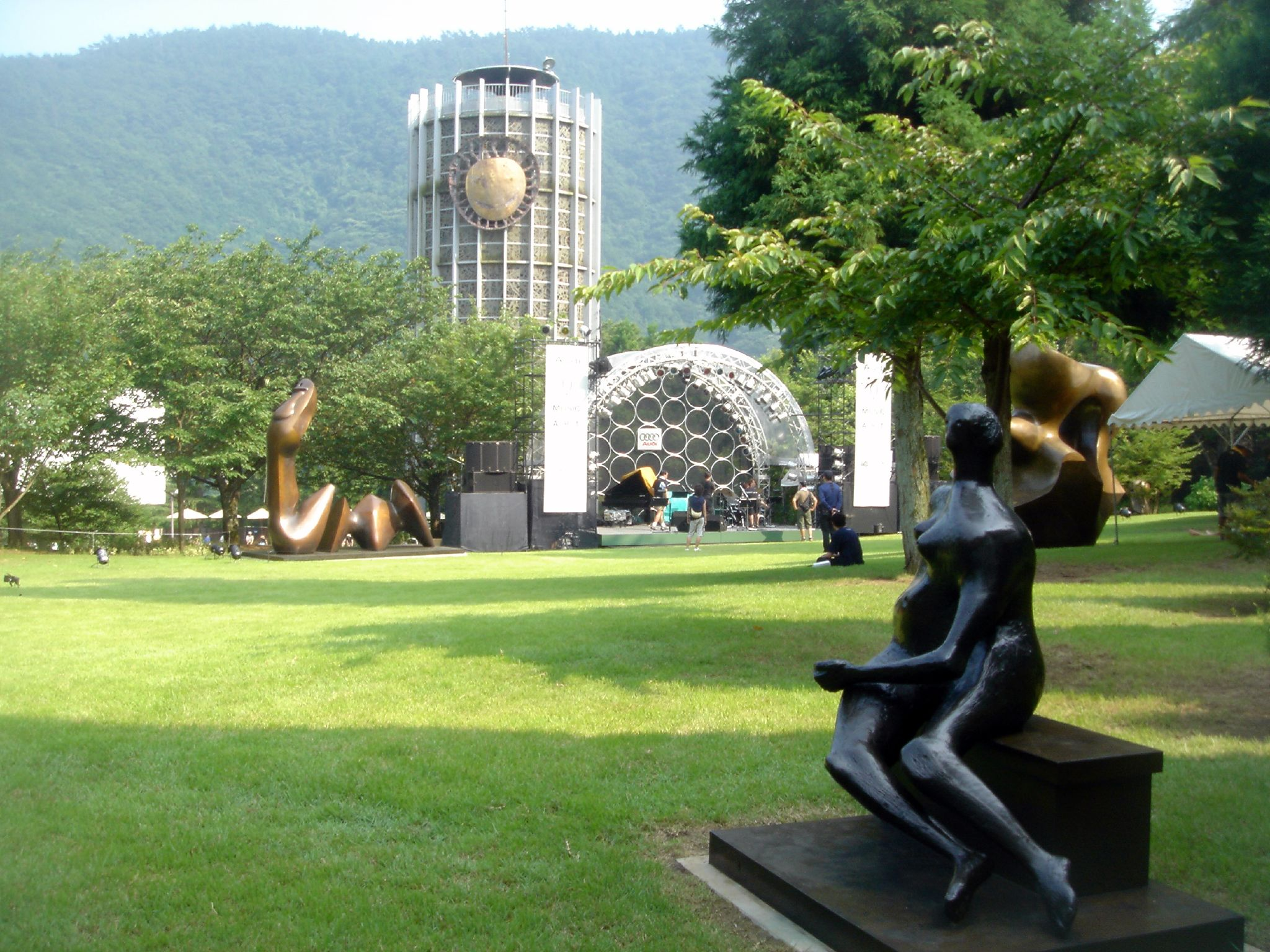
Exterior park view

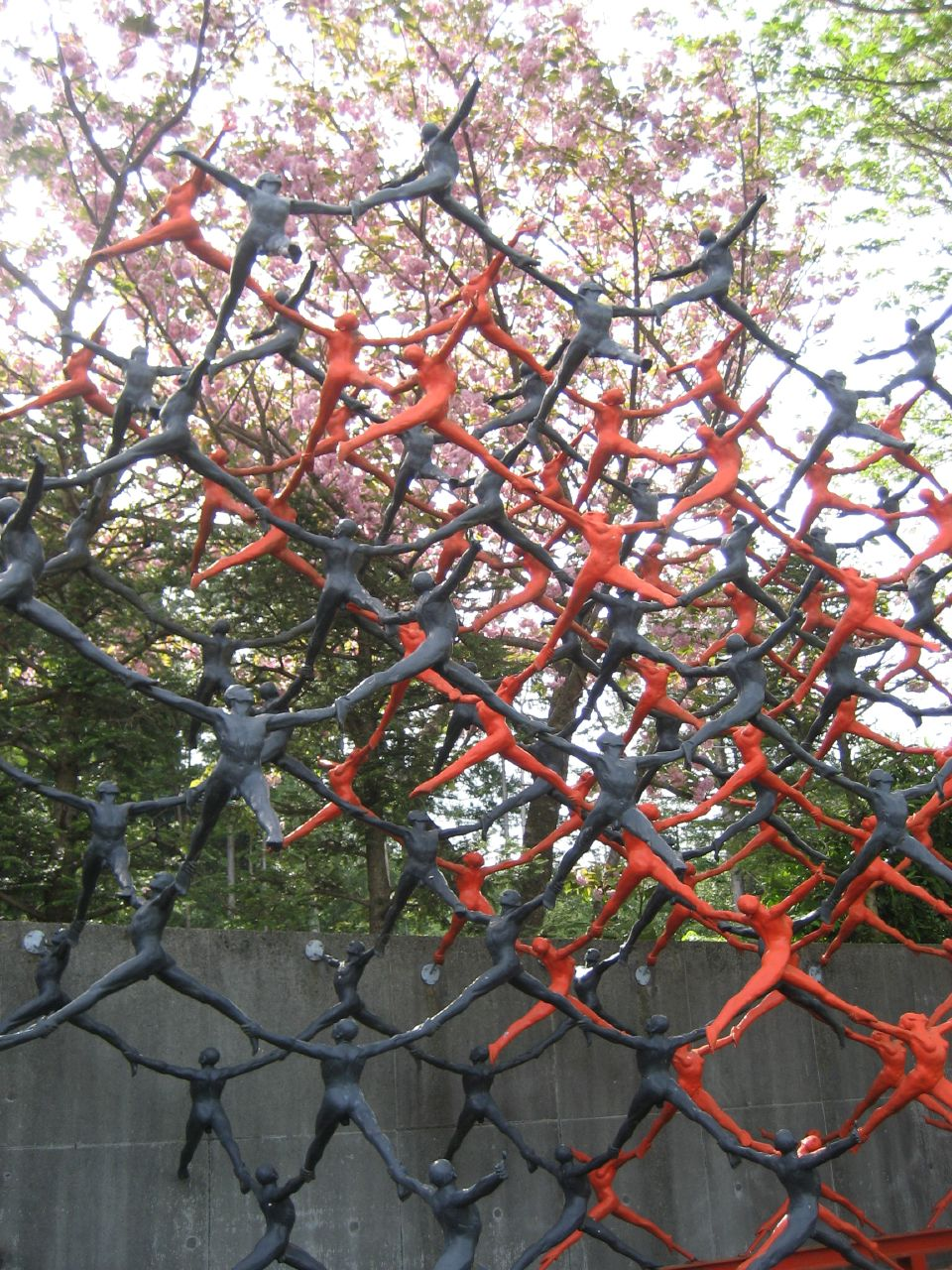
Goto Ryoji, 1978, Intersecting Space Construction

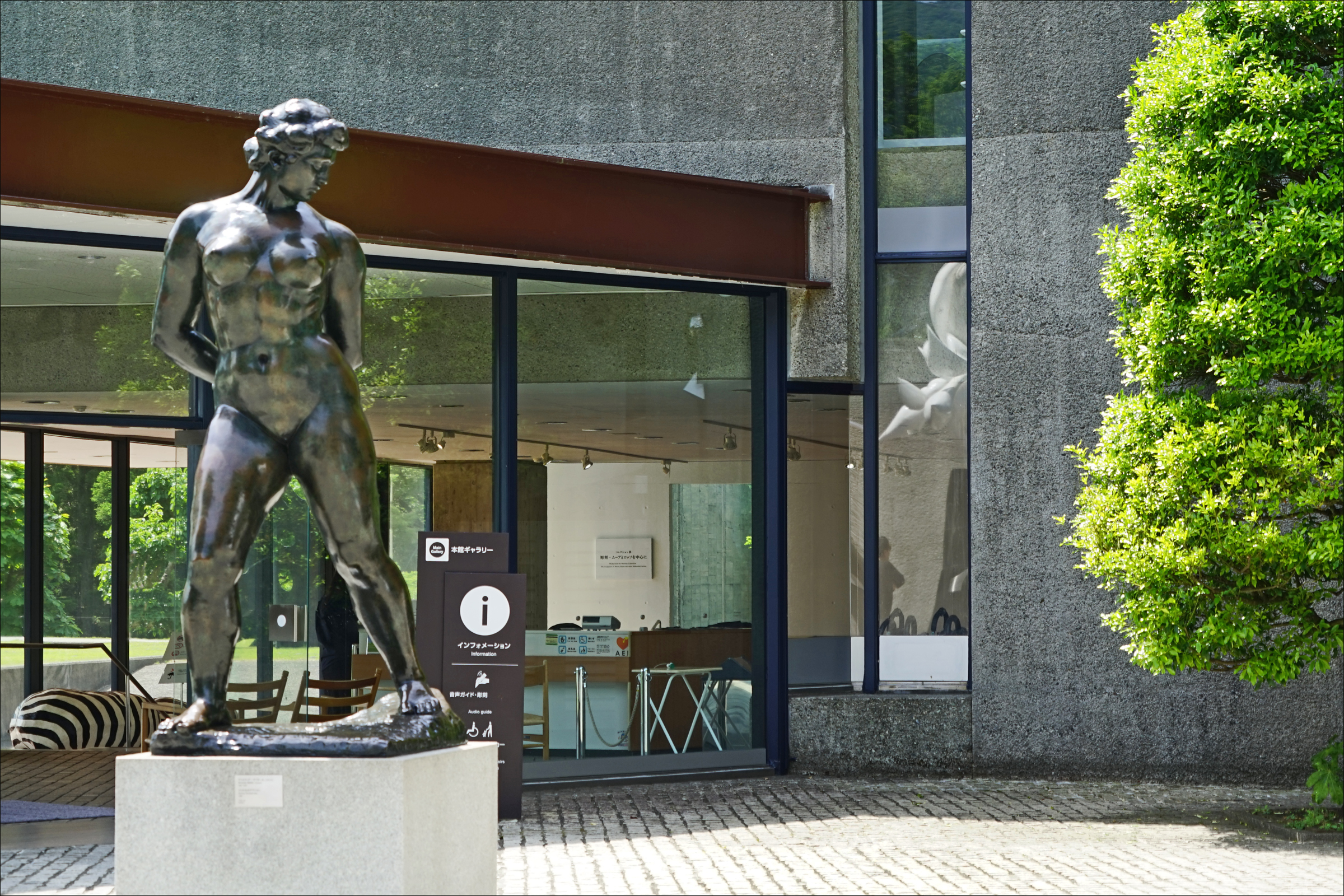
Aristide Maillol, 1905–06, Action Enchained
