= Yasurō Abe =

Japanese academic (born 1953)

- Born: 24 December 1953 (age 72); Japan Kanagawa, Yokohama
- Other name: 阿部泰郎
- Occupations: folklore, religion

Yasurō Abe (阿部 泰郎, Abe Yasurō; born 1953), is a Japanese academic.

== Career ==
He is a professor at Nagoya University.

He is known for scholarly work in ancient and medieval Japanese manuscripts.

== Selected works ==
In a statistical overview derived from writings by and about Yasurō Abe, OCLC/WorldCat encompasses roughly 40+ works in 50+ publications in 2 languages and 200+ library holdings.

- 因緣抄 (1988)
- 湯屋の皇后 : 中世の性と聖なるもの (1998)
- 守覚法親王と仁和寺御流の文献学的研究 (1998)
- 聖者の推参: 中世の声とヲコなるもの by 阿部泰郎 (2001)
- 伝記験記集 (2004)
- 類聚神祇本源 by 村松家行 (2004)
- 法儀表白集 (2005)
- 伊勢神道集 (2005)
- 中世先徳著作集 (2006)
- 性霊集注 (2007)

Articles

- Chūsei Nanto no shūkyō to geinō: Shinnyoni to Wakamiya miko o megurite (中世南都の宗教と芸能—信如尼と若宮巫女を巡りて). Kokugo to kokubungaku (1987) 64.5: 72–85
