= Hisashi Abe =

Japanese zoologist (born 1933)

- Born: 1933 (age 92–93); Yoshinogawa, Empire of Japan
- Scientific career
- Fields: Zoology, taxonomy
- Workplaces: Hokkaido University

Hisashi Abe (阿部 永, Abe Hisashi; born 1933) is a Japanese mammalogist and a former professor of Zoology at Hokkaido University Sapporo in Hokkaidō, Japan. He has authored a variety of publications on the taxonomy of various mammal species endemic to East Asia. He was formerly the president of Mammal Society of Japan.

== Early life ==
Abe was born during 1933 in Yoshinogawa, Tokushima.
