= Fuyumi Abe =

Japanese singer-songwriter

Fuyumi Abe 阿部芙蓉美
- Born: 20 February 1983 (age 42)
- Origin: Wakkanai, Hokkaido, Japan
- Genres: J-pop; Folk
- Occupations: Singer; songwriter; record producer; composer; voice actor
- Instruments: Vocals; Guitar
- Years active: 2004–present
- Labels: Hip Land Music; 3rd Stone Records; For Life Music
- Website: Fuyumi Abe Official Website

Fuyumi Abe (阿部 芙蓉美, Abe Fuyumi) (born 20 February 1983) is a Japanese singer-songwriter.

== Discography ==
=== Albums ===
==== Studio albums ====
List of albums, with selected chart positions
Title	Album details	Peak positions
Title	Album details	JPN Oricon
Blues	Released: 30 April 2008; Label: For Life Music; Format(s): CD, Digital download	146
Chinmoku no Koibito	Released: 7 March 2012; Label: 3rd Stone Records; Format(s): CD, Digital download	266
How to Live	Released: 3 April 2013; Label: 3rd Stone Records; Format(s): CD, Digital download	159
"—" denotes items which were released before the creation of the G-Music or Gaon Charts, or items that did not chart.

=== Extended plays ===
List of albums, with selected chart positions
Title	Album details	Peak positions
Title	Album details	JPN Oricon
Mini Album	Released: 7 March 2007; Label: 3rd Stone Records; Format(s): CD, Digital download	—
Birthday	Released: 23 December 2009; Label: For Life Music; Format(s): CD, Digital download	—
Machi	Released: 24 August 2011; Label: For Life Music; Format(s): CD, Digital download	212
ABEFUYUMI EP	Released: 20 August 2014; Label: 3rd Stone Records; Format(s): CD, Digital download	150
"—" denotes items which were released before the creation of the G-Music or Gaon Charts, or items that did not chart.

=== Singles ===
==== As lead artist ====
List of singles, with selected chart positions
Title	Year	Chart positions	Album
Title	Year	JPN Oricon	Album
"Gunjo"	2007	—	Blues
"Seishun to Roji"	2007	—	Blues
"Akehanatsu Mado"	2008	122	Blues
"Namida wa Kawakanai"	2008	122	Blues
"One Night Trip"	2008	185	Blues
"Sora ni Mau"	2010	196	Machi
"Heart of Gold"	2018	—	TBA
"Gomidame no Ballad"	2018	—	TBA
"Tori" (Bird)	2019	—	TBA
"Nagi"	2020	—	TBA
"Soda"	2021	—	TBA
"—" denotes items which were released before the creation of the G-Music or Billboard charts, or items that did not chart.

==== Promotional singles ====
Title	Year	Peak chart positions	Album
Title	Year	JPN Billboard	Album
"Atatamete Yaruyo"	2006	—	Mini Album
"Watashitachi no Nozomu Mono wa"	2009	—	Machi
"Tell Me (You Make Me Feel Better)" (Japanese version)	2010	—	Non-album single
"Sekai"	2010	—	Machi
"Machi" (Drama version)	2011	—	Non-album single

=== Other appearances ===
List of non-studio album or guest appearances that feature Hikaru Utada
Title	Year	Album
"Sono Machi no Kodomo" (Ending Theme)	2010	Otomo Yoshihide Soundtracks Vol. 0
"Kurumi no Heya A"	2011	"Kurumi no Heya" Otomo Yoshihide Soundtracks Vol. 1
"Momoko no Waltz" (Vocal version)	2011	"Kurumi no Heya" Otomo Yoshihide Soundtracks Vol. 1
"Machi" (Alternative version)	2011	"Kurumi no Heya" Otomo Yoshihide Soundtracks Vol. 1
"Akechi no Kimochi" (Rekishi featuring Abe Sorry Daijin Chan)	2014	Rekishi
"Towa." (Backing vocals for Naotaro Moriyama)	2016	Ah

== See also ==
- List of J-pop artists
