= Tanagura Castle =

Castle in Tanagura, Fukushima prefecture, Japan

- 棚倉城
- Tanagura, Fukushima Prefecture, Japan
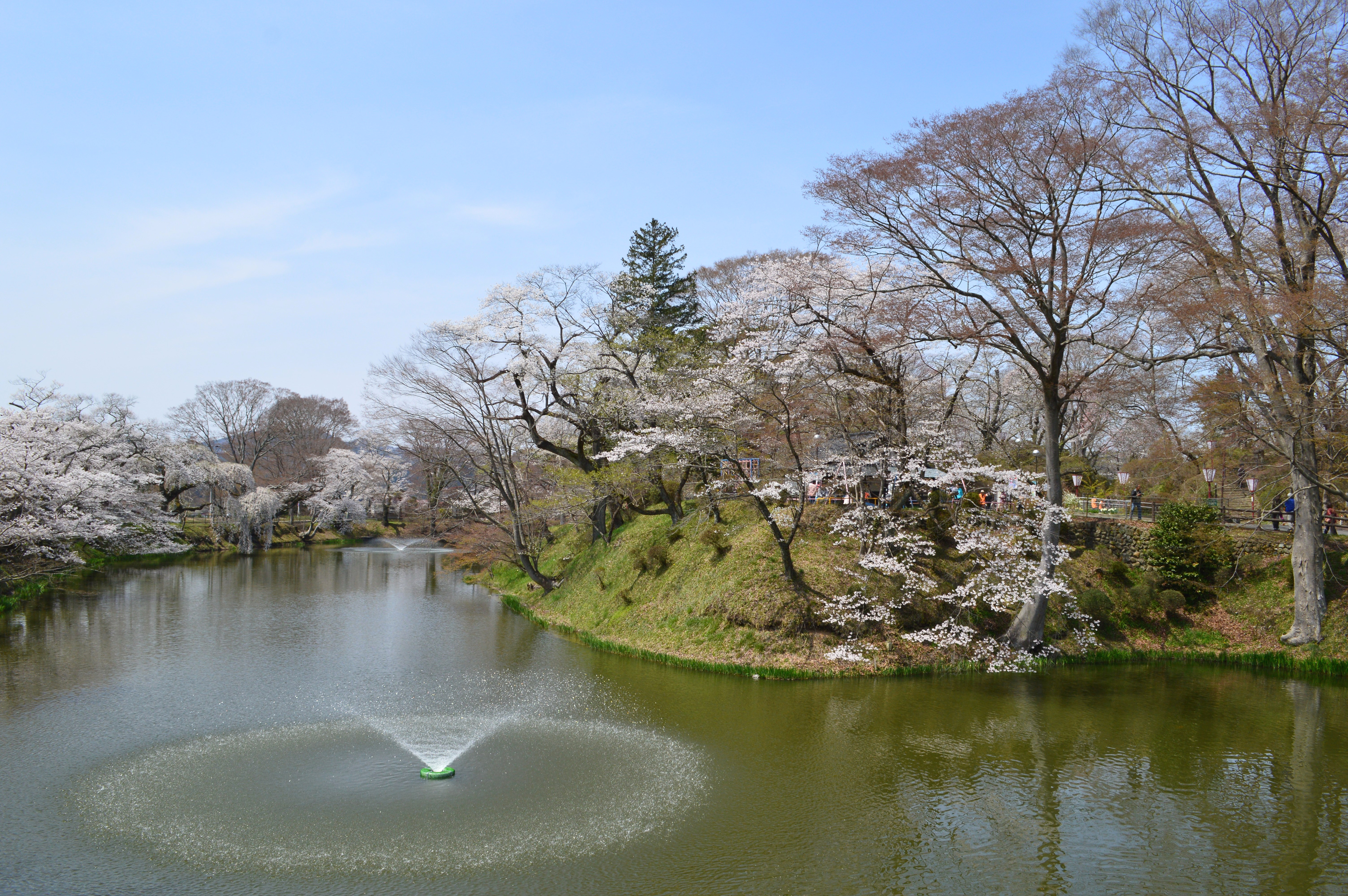
- surviving moat of Tanagura Castle

Site information
- Type: flatland-style Japanese castle
- Open to the public: yes
- Condition: Ruins

Location
- Location within Fukushima Prefecture Location within Japan
- Coordinates: 37°1′46.89″N 140°23′8.29″E

Site history
- Built: 1625
- Built by: Niwa Nagashige
- In use: Edo period
- Demolished: 1868

Tanagura Castle (棚倉城, Tanagura-jō) a flatland-style Japanese castle located in the town of Tanagura, Tamura District, Fukushima Prefecture, in the southern Tōhoku region of Japan. It also called Kamegajō Castle (亀ケ城) . Built in 1625 by Niwa Nagashige, the castle was occupied by a succession of daimyō of Tanagura Domain under the Edo period Tokugawa shogunate.

== Background ==
Tanagura is located at the southeastern edge of Kōriyama basin, approximately 50 kilometers south of the modern city of Kōriyama. The location commands the entrance to the long and narrow Kuji River valley, which forms a strategic bottleneck connecting the Kantō region with northern Japan.

The central area of Tanagura Castle is a rectangular enclosure approximately 200 by 100 meter in width, surrounded by a thick clay rampart 10 meters high, and a 20 meter wide moat. The enclosure had a Yagura tower at each corner, and both the front and rear gates were masugata-style gates, consisting in a courtyard with two gates set at a square angle, one giving access to the castle and one facing the outside. Secondary enclosures completely surrounded the central area, with gates to the north, east and south, and with the west side facing a cliff protected by stone walls. The north side of the castle also had a tertiary enclosure. The castle never had a tenshu.

== History ==
During the Kamakura period, the Tanagura area was governed from Akadate Castle, a simple fortification located to the north of present-day Tanagura town. By the Sengoku period, the Tanagura area came under the control of the Yuki clan based at Shirakawa, who were allied with the Ashina clan of Aizu. The area was constantly contested by the Satake clan of Hitachi Province. However, after the rise of Toyotomi Hideyoshi to power, he awarded the area to the Satake, who were his close allies. Following the death of Hideyoshi, the Satake continued to support the Toyotomi clan, but after the defeat of the Toyotomi armies at the Battle of Sekigahara, the victorious Tokugawa Ieyasu relocated the Satake to Dewa Province. With the establishment of the Tokugawa shogunate, Tanagura was awarded to Tachibana Muneshige as part of Tanagura Domain. After the Siege of Osaka, he was allowed to reclaim his former holdings in Yanagawa in Kyushu, and was replaced by Niwa Nagashige. Niwa Nagahide had been one of Oda Nobunaga's leading generals and had even assisted in the building of Azuchi Castle, but had been dispossessed by Hideyoshi. His son, Niwa Nagahige became daimyō of Tanagura in 1625 and was ordered to construct a new castle: however, the Niwa clan were very poor and although the layout of Tanagura castle was very modern, they could not afford stone walls or much in the way of towers. Due to their limited resources, the Niwa made maximum use of the terrain, situating the new castle on narrow land between two rivers.

The Niwa clan were relocated to Shirakawa Domain only two years after the construction of Tanagura Castle, and were replaced by a succession of fudai daimyō, the Naitō clan, Ōta clan, Matsudaira clan, Ogasawara clan, Inoue clan, and Abe clan, all of whom did little to change the design of the castle or its fortifications.

During the Boshin War Tanagura Domain joined the Ōuetsu Reppan Dōmei, and the centuries of neglect in its fortifications soon became evident. Due to its limited size, it could not hold sufficient soldiers and supplies, and is clay walls and moats could not stop an enemy armed with modern rifles and cannon. Furthermore, the castle was designed with the intent to defend strongly against an enemy coming from the north, rather than from the south. Tanagura Domain had lost most of its fighting capability in the earlier Battle of Shirakawa Castle, and the army of the new Meiji government was able to take Tanagura Castle in only one day.

== Current situation ==
After the Meiji revolution, all the remaining structures of the castle were removed or destroyed, except for one gate which was transferred to a nearby Buddhist temple. The shape of the earthen ramparts and moat largely remains and the area is used as a public park famed for its sakura trees in spring. In 2019, the grounds were designated as a National Historic Site.

== See also ==
- List of Historic Sites of Japan (Fukushima)

== Literature ==
- Schmorleitz, Morton S. (1974). Castles in Japan. Tokyo: Charles E. Tuttle Co. pp. 144–145. ISBN 0-8048-1102-4.
- Motoo, Hinago (1986). Japanese Castles. Tokyo: Kodansha. p. 200 pages. ISBN 0-87011-766-1.
- Mitchelhill, Jennifer (2004). Castles of the Samurai: Power and Beauty. Tokyo: Kodansha. p. 112 pages. ISBN 4-7700-2954-3.
- Turnbull, Stephen (2003). Japanese Castles 1540-1640. Osprey Publishing. p. 64 pages. ISBN 1-84176-429-9.
