= Abe Masakiyo (Shirakawa) =

Japanese daimyō (1850–1878)

- 阿部正静
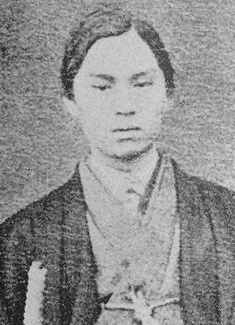
- Abe Masakiyo (in early Meiji period)

8th Daimyō of Shirakawa Domain
- In office 1866–1866
- Monarchs: Shōgun: Tokugawa Iemochi; Tokugawa Yoshinobu
- Preceded by: Abe Masatō
- Succeeded by: < position abolished >

Daimyō of Tanagura Domain
- In office 1867–1868
- Preceded by: Matsudaira Yasuhide
- Succeeded by: Abe Masakoto

Personal details
- Born: January 11, 1850
- Died: January 23, 1878 (aged 28)
- Spouse: daughter of Abe Masakata
- Parent: Abe Masatō (father)

Abe Masakiyo (阿部正静, January 11, 1850 - January 23, 1878) was the 8th (and final) Abe daimyō of Shirakawa Domain, and the 1st Abe daimyō of Tanagura Domain.

== Biography ==
Abe Masakiyo was the eldest son of Abe Masato, who at the time was a 3000 koku hatamoto. After the sudden death of Abe Masahisa of Shirakawa Domain in 1864, Abe Masato was selected to posthumously inherit the 100,000 koku domain and Masakiyo inherited the original 3000 koku holding as well as the courtesy title of Mimasaka-no-kami, and his Court rank of Junior Fifth Rank, Lower Grade. However, in 1866, when his father was forced into retirement for his actions in the opening of the port of Hyōgo to foreign trade, Masakiyo was named daimyō of Shirakawa. The very same day, he was transferred to Tanagura and Shirakawa Domain became tenryō territory under direct control of the Shogunate. Although he protested the move, and later petitioned to return to Shirakawa, he was allowed to return for less than a month before Komine Castle was again taken from him, and placed under the control of Nihonmatsu Domain.

He sided with the Ōuetsu Reppan Dōmei during the Boshin War, fighting against the Meiji government during the Battle of Shirakawa. Komone Castle fell to government forces, and Tanagura fell shortly afterwards to an army led by Itagaki Taisuke. Masakiyo surrender to the Meiji government, blaming his participation in the Ōuetsu Reppan Dōmei on his karō, Abe Masateru, who had conveniently been killed in combat during the Battle of Shirakawa, and thus the government reduced his holdings from 100,000 koku to 60,000 koku rather than abolishing the domain completely. However, Abe Masakiyo went ordered to Tokyo, where he was to remain with his son under house arrest. He died in 1878.
