= Masakoto =

- Gender: Male

Origin
- Origin: Japanese
- Meaning: Different meanings depending on the kanji used

Masakoto (written: 政言, 正功 or 昌言) is a masculine Japanese given name. Notable people with the name include:

- Abe Masakoto (阿部 正功; 1860-1925), Japanese daimyō
- Sano Masakoto (佐野 政言; 1757–1784), Japanese samurai
- Yonekura Masakoto (米倉 昌言; 1837–1909), Japanese daimyō
