= Abe Tadaaki =

Japanese daimyō

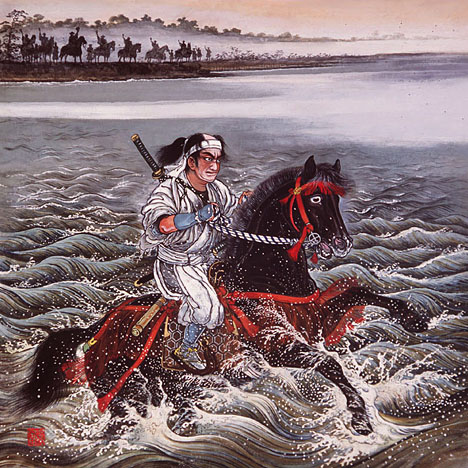

Daimyō of Oshi
- In office 1639–1671
- Preceded by: Matsudaira Nobutsuna
- Succeeded by: Abe Masayoshi

Personal details
- Born: Edo, Japan

Abe Tadaaki (阿部 忠秋; September 4, 1602 – June 25, 1671) was a high-ranking government official in Japan under Tokugawa Iemitsu and Ietsuna, the third and fourth Tokugawa Shōgun. As the daimyō of the Oshi Domain in modern-day Saitama Prefecture, with an income of 80,000 koku (earlier 50,000), Abe was appointed wakadoshiyori (junior councillor) in 1633, and rōjū (Elder Councillor) shortly afterwards.

Iemitsu died in 1651 and was succeeded by his ten-year-old son Ietsuna. In accordance with the custom of junshi, a number of Iemitsu's closest retainers and advisors committed suicide so as to follow their lord in death; Abe did not engage in this practice, and was left, along with a handful of other high-ranking officials and advisors, to handle the affairs of government.

Especially remembered for his integrity, high morals, and practical sense of good government, Abe Tadaaki is known for his attempts to find employment for a number of samurai who became rōnin in the wake of the Keian Uprising, a coup d'état which failed to be executed that same year, just after Iemitsu's death. While other government ministers reacted to the uprising with the instinctive desire to expel all rōnin from Edo (the shogunal capital; today Tokyo), Abe thought it more pertinent to take a somewhat softer tack, aiding the rōnin in seeking legitimate employment, and thus drastically reducing the number who would have reason to take up arms against the shogunate.

Several years before Tadaaki's death in 1671, Sakai Tadakiyo was appointed head of the council of rōjū; Tadaaki constantly rebuked Sakai for his poor sense of proper policy, and his laidback nature. He accused Sakai of taking bribes, and of handling situations on a case-by-case basis, without any sense of overall policy or progress towards a goal. Nevertheless, after thirty-eight years of loyal service to the shogunate, Tadaaki died aged 69, leaving the government in the hands of the likes of those whose policies (or dire lack thereof) would lead over the course of several decades to the Genroku period (1688–1704), which saw a peak in corruption, hedonism, and wastefulness.

== Notes ==
Preceded by Hineno Yoshiaki	Daimyō of Mibu; 1635–1639	Succeeded by Miura Masatsugu
Preceded by Matsudaira Nobutsuna	Daimyō of Oshi; 1639–1671	Succeeded by Abe Masayoshi
