= Abe Masahiro =

Japanese politician (1819–1857)

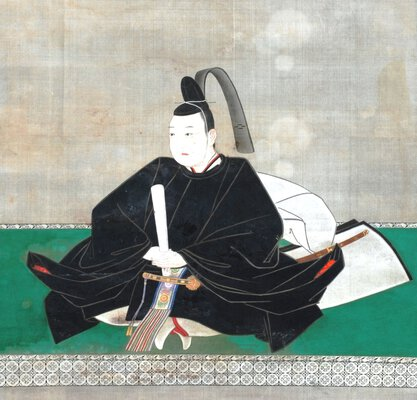
- Abe Masahiro

Lord of Fukuyama
- In office January 31, 1837 – August 6, 1857
- Preceded by: Abe Masayasu
- Succeeded by: Abe Masanori

Personal details
- Born: December 3, 1819 Edo, Japan
- Died: August 6, 1857 (aged 37) Edo, Japan
- Spouse(s): Matsudaira Noriko, a daughter of Matsudaira Haruyoshi

Abe Masahiro (阿部 正弘; December 3, 1819 – August 6, 1857) was the chief senior councilor (rōjū) in the Tokugawa shogunate of the Bakumatsu period at the time of the arrival of Commodore Matthew Perry on his mission to open Japan to the outside world. Abe was instrumental in the eventual signing of the Convention of Kanagawa in 1854. Abe did not sign the treaty himself or participate in the negotiations in person; this was done by his plenipotentiary Hayashi Akira. His courtesy title was Ise-no-kami.

== Biography ==
=== Early life ===
Abe Masahiro was born in his family's residence outside Edo Castle. He was the 5th son of Abe Masakiyo, the 5th daimyō of Fukuyama Domain. Upon his father's death in 1826, his elder brother Masayasu became daimyō of Fukuyama; Abe was moved to the domain's naka-yashiki ("middle residence") in Hongō, Edo (modern-day Bunkyō, Tokyo). However, in 1836, Masayasu adopted his brother as heir. Abe became clan leader and daimyō of Fukuyama upon his brother's retirement on December 25, 1836.

In early 1837, he left Edo and made the long journey to Fukuyama to formally enter his domain. This would be the only time that Abe set foot in his domain, as his career as a bureaucrat within the Tokugawa shogunate eclipsed his obligations to return to Fukuyama under the sankin-kōtai system.

=== Career in the Tokugawa Shogunate ===
Abe was appointed to the post of sōshaban (master of ceremony) on September 1, 1838; on May 15, 1840, he received the post of jisha-bugyō (Magistrate of shrines and temples). One of his acts was to order the destruction of the Nichiren sect temple of Kannō-ji, whose priests had become involved in a scandal with ladies of the Ōoku under Shōgun Tokugawa Ienari.

In September 1843, Abe became rōjū at the young age of 25, moving his residence to the Abe family's estate at Tatsunokuchi, outside Edo Castle (modern day Ōtemachi). He became rōjū shuza (老中首座, presiding senior councillor) in September 1845, after Mizuno Tadakuni lost his standing over the failure of the Tenpō Reforms. Abe held this position throughout the administrations of Shōgun Tokugawa Ieyoshi and Tokugawa Iesada, working to unify shogunal politics.

He supervised the reconstruction of the western enceinte of Edo Castle in 1852, and was awarded an increase of 10,000 koku in income for this service. In the meantime, he kept the shogunate abreast of foreign political developments, such as the outbreak of the First Opium War, which provided an impetus to strengthen the nation’s coastal defenses to help maintain the isolationist policies of the time.

=== The Perry expedition and aftermath ===
In 1852, United States Navy Commodore Matthew Perry was sent in command of a squadron of warships by American President Millard Fillmore. President Fillmore had forbidden Perry to use threats or force. As a lawyer, Fillmore believed that the Shogunate would respond reasonably to American concerns about U.S. mariners washed up on Japanese shores and the need to repatriate Japanese fishermen washed up on American shores. Nevertheless, Perry, who hailed from a military family and himself had been hardened by combat in war, chose to use bluffing tactics in flagrant violation of Fillmore's wishes. Perry arrived with a squadron of four warships at Uraga, at the mouth of Edo Bay in the evening of July 8, 1853. After refusing Japanese demands that he proceed to Nagasaki, which was the designated port for foreign contact, and after threatening to continue directly on to Edo, the nation’s capital and to burn it to the ground if necessary, he was allowed to land at nearby Kurihama on July 14 and to deliver his letter.

Despite years of debate on the isolation policy, Perry's visit created great controversy within the highest levels of the Tokugawa shogunate. The Shōgun, Tokugawa Ieyoshi, died days after Perry’s departure, and was succeeded by his sickly young son, Tokugawa Iesada, leaving effective administration in the hands of the Council of Elders (rōjū) led by Abe Masahiro. Abe felt that it was currently impossible for Japan to resist the American demands by military force, and yet was reluctant to take any action on his own authority for such an unprecedented situation. Attempting to legitimize any decision taken, Abe polled all of the daimyō for their opinions. This was the first time that the Tokugawa shogunate had allowed its decision-making to be a matter of public debate, and had the unforeseen consequence of portraying the Shogunate as weak and indecisive. The results of the poll also failed to provide Abe with an answer, as of the 61 known responses, 19 were in favor of accepting the American demands, and 19 were opposed. Of the remainder, 14 gave vague responses expressing concern of possible war, seven suggested making temporary concessions and two advised that they would simply go along with whatever was decided. Perry returned again on February 13, 1854, with an even larger force of eight warships and made it clear that he would not leave until a treaty was signed. Negotiations began on March 8 and proceeded for around one month. The Japanese side gave in to almost all of Perry's demands, with the exception of a commercial agreement modeled after previous American treaties with China, which Perry agreed to defer to a later time. The main controversy centered on the selection of the ports to open, with Perry adamantly rejecting Nagasaki. The Convention of Kanagawa was signed at Kanagawa, adjacent to the site of the future city of Yokohama on March 31. Abe did not sign the treaty himself or participate in the negotiations in person; this was done by his plenipotentiary Hayashi Akira. Similar treaties were concluded with Russia, the Netherlands, and Great Britain soon afterwards.

Abe came under criticism from the tozama daimyō, the Imperial Court and various factions within the government for perceived appeasement to the foreign powers. In September 1855, he was forced to resign his post, and was replaced by Hotta Masayoshi in October.

=== Later life and death ===
Despite his resignation as rōjū shuza, Abe remained as one of the rōjū and continued to have significant influence for the rest of his life. Despite the precarious state of finances in Fukuyama Domain, he built a domain academy to teach Western sciences and to modernize his military. He also supported the notion of government selection of talented men, even of low birth, to serve as workers or bureaucrats. He was a driving force behind the establishment of the Nagasaki Naval Training Center and the revocation of restrictions on construction of large ocean-going vessels.

Abe died on August 6, 1857, at the age of 39, possibly due to cancer, and was succeeded by his nephew, Abe Masanori (the first Abe daimyō of Shirakawa Domain, Abe Masanori.)

== Notes ==
Preceded by Abe Masayasu	7th (Abe) Daimyō of Fukuyama; 1837–1857	Succeeded by Abe Masanori
