= Yasuhide =

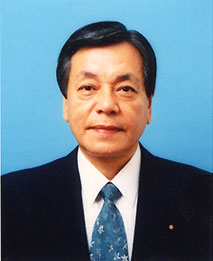
- Yasuhide Yamana, Japanese politician
- Pronunciation: jasɯçide (IPA)
- Gender: Male

Origin
- Origin: Japanese
- Meaning: Different meanings depending on the kanji used

Yasuhide is a masculine Japanese given name.

== Written forms ==
Yasuhide can be written using different combinations of kanji characters. Here are some examples:

- 康英, "healthy, hero"
- 康秀, "healthy, excellence"
- 康栄, "healthy, prosperity"
- 靖英, "peaceful, hero"
- 靖秀, "peaceful, excellence"
- 靖栄, "peaceful, prosperity"
- 靖日出, "peaceful, sunrise"
- 安英, "tranquil, hero"
- 安秀, "tranquil, excellence"
- 安栄, "tranquil, prosperity"
- 保英, "preserve, hero"
- 保秀, "preserve, excellence"
- 保栄, "preserve, prosperity"
- 泰英, "peaceful, hero"
- 泰秀, "peaceful, excellence"
- 泰栄, "peaceful, prosperity"
- 易英, "divination, hero"
- 易秀, "divination, excellence"
- 恭英, "respectful, hero"

The name can also be written in hiragana やすひで or katakana ヤヤスヒデ.

== Notable people with the name ==
- Yasuhide Fun'ya (文屋 康秀; died in 885), early Heian period poet
- Yasuhide Ihara (井原 康秀; born 1973), Japanese football player
- Yasuhide Ito (伊藤 康英; born 1960), Japanese composer
- Yasuhide Kobashi (古橋 矢須秀; 1931–2003), Japanese artist
- Yasuhide Matsudaira (松平 康英; 1830–1904), Japanese daimyō
- Yasuhide Nakayama (中山 泰秀; born 1970), Japanese politician
- Yasuhide Yamana (山名 靖英; born 1944), Japanese politician
