= Niwa Mitsushige =

- 丹羽光重
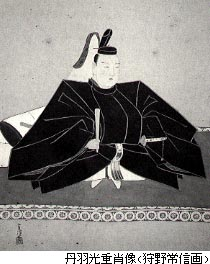
- Niwa Mitsushige

Personal details
- Born: February 8, 1622
- Died: May 18, 1701 (aged 79)
- Spouse: daughter of Andō Shigenaga of Takasaki Domain
- Parent: Niwa Nagashige (father)

2nd Daimyō of Shirakawa Domain
- In office 1637–1643
- Preceded by: Niwa Nagashige
- Succeeded by: Sakakibara Tadatsugu

1st Daimyō of Nihonmatsu Domain
- In office 1643–1679
- Preceded by: Katō Akitoshi
- Succeeded by: Niwa Nagatsugu

Niwa Mitsushige (丹羽光重; February 8, 1622 – May 18, 1701) was an Edo period Japanese samurai, 2nd Niwa daimyō of Shirakawa Domain and the 1st Niwa daimyō of Nihonmatsu Domain in the Tōhoku region of Japan. He was the 2nd hereditary chieftain of the Niwa clan. His courtesy title was Saikyō-no-daifu, and his Court rank was Junior Fourth Rank, Lower Grade.

== Biography ==
Mitsushige was the third son of Niwa Nagashige, daimyō of Shirakawa Domain. His childhood name of Miyamatsu-maru (鍋太郎). As both of his older brothers died in childhood, he was named heir in 1628. In 1634, he was received in formal audience by Shōgun Tokugawa Iemitsu, and received a kanji from Iemitsu's name, becoming Niwa Mitsushige, along with the courtesy title of Saikyō-no-suke and Junior Fifth Rank, Lower Grade. On his father's death in 1637, he became daimyō of Shirakawa Domain. Five years later, in 1642, his court rank was raised to Junior Fourth Rank, Lower Grade.

In 1643, the Tokugawa shogunate ordered the Niwa clan to relocate to Nihonmatsu. Upon entering Nihonmatsu Castle in 1644, Mitsushige immediately embarked on a program to improve upon the roads and to rebuild the surrounding jōkamachi. Mitsushige was also noted as a patron of the arts, and especially favoured the Sekishū-branch of the Japanese tea ceremony along with ikebana and Japanese calligraphy and instituted the Nihonmatsu Lantern Festival in 1664. He was also a painter, having been trained in the Kanō school, using the pseudonym Gyokuhō (玉峰). He also invited noted priests from Mount Kōya and Manpuku-ji to his domains to establish Buddhist temples. In 1658, he gained the additional courtesy title of chamberlain. He retired from public life in 1679, turning the domain over to his eldest son Niwa Nagatsugu. He died in 1701.

== Notes ==
Preceded by Niwa Nagashige	2nd (Niwa) daimyō of Shirakawa; 1637-1643	Succeeded by -none-
Preceded by -none-	1st (Niwa) daimyō of Nihonmatsu; 1643-1679	Succeeded by Niwa Nagatsugu
