= Oshi Domain =

Oshi Domain 忍藩
- under Tokugawa shogunate Japan
- 1590–1871
- Capital: Oshi Castle
- Government
  - Type: Daimyō
- Historical era: Edo period
  - Established: 1590
  - Disestablished: 1871
- Today part of: part of Saitama Prefecture

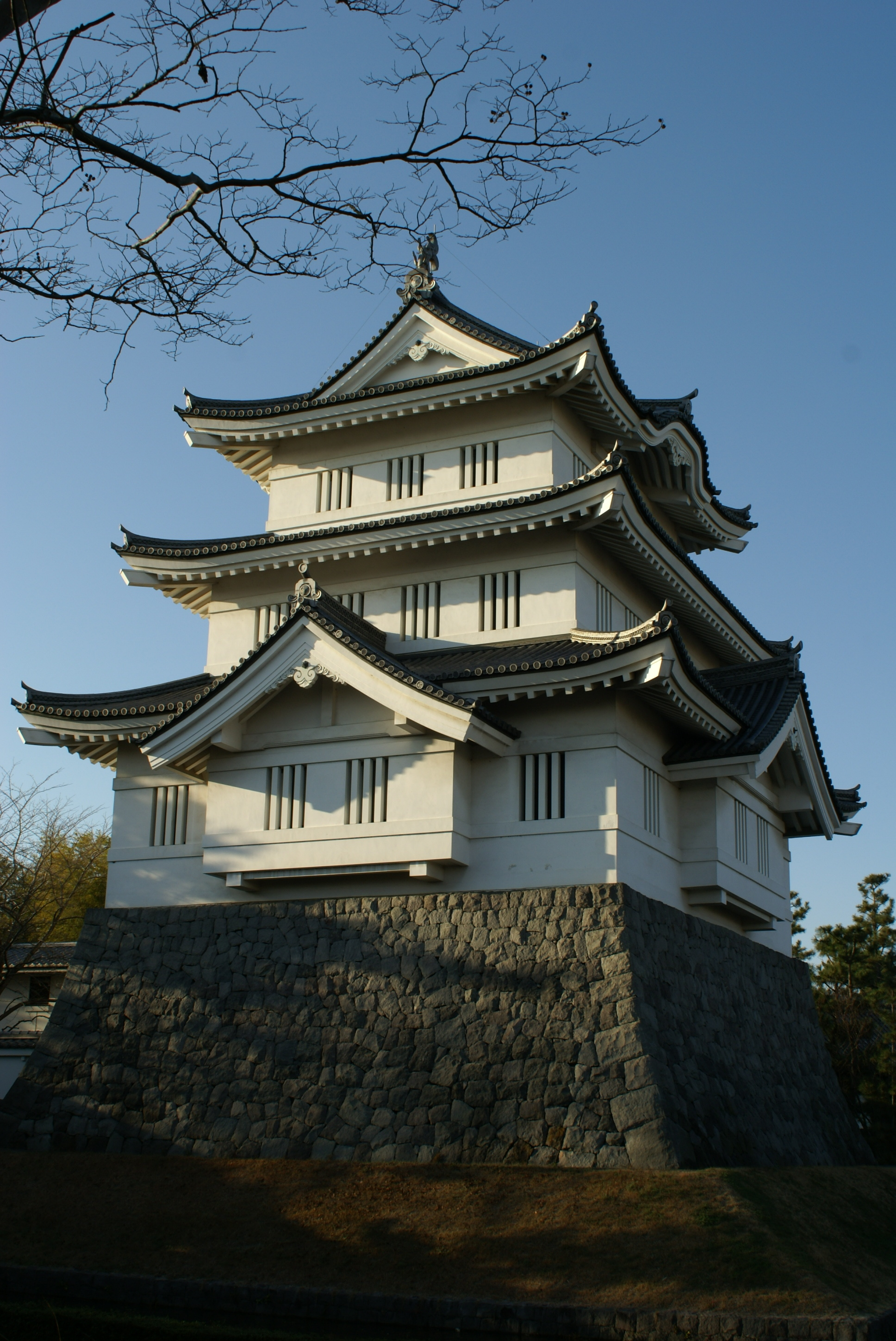
Reconstructed Oshi Castle, administrative center of Oshi Domain in Gyōda, Saitama

Oshi Domain (忍藩, Oshi-han) was a feudal domain under the Tokugawa shogunate of Edo period Japan, located in Musashi Province (modern-day Saitama Prefecture), Japan. It was centered on Oshi Castle in what is now part of the city of Gyōda, Saitama.

== History ==
Oshi Castle was completed by Narita Akiyasu around 1479. The Narita family ruled over the area of Gyōda as retainers to the Odawara Hōjō clan. The castle made use of marshes and swamplands in its surroundings and was considered impregnable. In 1590, Toyotomi Hideyoshi dispatched his senior retainer Ishida Mitsunari with an army of 23,000 troops to seize the castle. In the Siege of Oshi, the castle's 619 samurai and 2000 local conscripts held off numerous attacks, and the castle surrendered only after word that their overlords had been defeated at the Siege of Odawara.

Afterwards, the area came under the control of Tokugawa Ieyasu, who assigned his 4th son, Matsudaira Tadayoshi to a 100,000 koku domain. However, as Tadayasu was only 11 years old, the domain was managed by Matsudaira Ietada, who repaired the battle-damaged castle and surrounding castle town until 1592. He was replaced by Matsudaira Tadayoshi of the Tōjō-branch of the Matsudaira clan until 1600. However, following the Battle of Sekigahara, Matsudaira Tadayoshi was promoted to Kiyosu Domain (620,000 koku) and Oshi Domain reverted to tenryō status.

The domain was revived in 1633 for the rōjū Matsudaira Nobutsuna, infamous for his role in the suppression of the Shimabara Rebellion. He moved on to Kawagoe Domain in 1638 and was replaced for the next nine generations by the Abe clan.

Abe Tadaaki was a close confidant of shōgun Tokugawa Iemitsu and served as wakadoshiyori and rōjū. His son Masayoshi served as Osaka-jō dai and Kyoto Shoshidai, as did many of the succeeding generations at Oshi Domain. In 1823, Abe Masanori was transferred to Shirakawa Domain, and Oshi was given to Matsudaira Tadataka of the Okudaira branch of the Matsudaira clan, formerly from Kuwana Domain. The Matsudaira continued to rule Oshi until the Meiji Restoration. Despite their fudai status, Matsudaira Tadakuni united the domain in favor of the Meiji government after shōgun Tokugawa Keiki abandoned his forces (including Tadakuni's son, Masudaira Tadazane)] following the Battle of Toba–Fushimi in the Boshin War. Following the Meiji Restoration, the final daimyō of Oshi Domain, Matsudaira Tadanori, married a daughter of Prince Fushimi Kuniie and was ennobled with the title of viscount (shishaku) in the kazoku peerage.

== Holdings at the end of the Edo period ==
As with most domains in the han system, Oshi Domain consisted of several discontinuous territories calculated to provide the assigned kokudaka, based on periodic cadastral surveys and projected agricultural yields.

- Musashi Province
  - 78 villages in Saitama District
  - 6 villages in Adachi District
  - 1 village in Obusuma District
  - 8 villages in Hanzawa District
  - 22 villages in Chichibu District
  - 6 villages in Osato District
  - 9 villages in Hara District
- Ise Province
  - 20 villages in Inabe District
  - 35 villages in Asake District
  - 17 villages in Mie District
- Harima Province
  - 4 villages in Kako District
  - 7 villages in Taka District
  - 4 villages in Kasai District

== List of daimyōs ==
#	Name	Tenure	Courtesy title	Court Rank	kokudaka
Fukōzu Matsudaira clan (fudai) 1590–1592
1	Matsudaira Ietada (松平家忠)	1590–1592	-unknown-	-unknown-	10,000 koku
Matsudaira clan (shinpan) 1592–1600
1	Matsudaira Tadayoshi (松平 忠吉)	1592–1600	Sankon-e-no-chujō (左近衛権中将 侍従)	3rd (従三位)	100,000 koku
	tenryō	1600–1633			
Nagasawa/Ōkōchi Matsudaira clan (fudai) 1633–1639
1	Matsudaira Nobutsuna (松平 信綱)	1633–1639	Izu-no-kami (伊豆守)	Lower 4th (従四位下)	30,000 koku
Abe clan (fudai) 1639–1823
1	Abe Tadaaki (阿部 忠秋)	1639–1671	Bungo-no-kami; Jijū (豊後守 侍従)	Lower 4th (従四位下)	50,000 koku
2	Abe Masayoshi (阿部 正能)	1671–1677	Harima-no-kami (播磨守)	Lower 4th (従四位下)	50,000 koku
3	Abe Masatake (阿部 正武)	1677–1704	Bungo-no-kami; Jijū (豊後守 侍従)	Lower 4th (従四位下)	50,000 -> 100,000 koku
4	Abe Masataka (阿部 正喬)	1704–1748	Bungo-no-kami; Jijū (豊後守 侍従)	Lower 4th (従四位下)	100,000 koku
5	Abe Masachika (阿部 正允)	1748–1780	Bungo-no-kami; Jijū (豊後守 侍従)	Lower 4th (従四位下)	100,000 koku
6	Abe Masatoshi (阿部 正敏)	1780–1787	Noto-no-kami (能登守)	Lower 4th (従四位下)	100,000 koku
7	Abe Masatsune (阿部 正識)	1787–1796	Bungo-no-kami (豊後守)	Lower 5th (従五位下)	100,000 koku
8	Abe Masayoshi (阿部 正由)	1796–1808	Bungo-no-kami; Jijū (豊後守 侍従)	Lower 4th (従四位下)	100,000 koku
9	Abe Masanori (阿部 正権)	1808–1823	-unknown-	-unknown-	100,000 koku
Okudaira Matsudaira clan (fudai) 1823–1871
1	Matsudaira Tadataka (松平 信発)	1823–1838	Minbu-taifu (民部大輔)	Lower 4th (従四位下)	100,000 koku
2	Matsudaira Tadasato (松平 忠彦)	1838–1841	Minbu-taifu (式部大輔 侍従)	Lower 4th (従四位下)	100,000 koku
3	Matsudaira Tadakuni (松平 忠国)	1841–1863	Shimōsa-no-kami; Jijū (下総守 侍従)	Lower 4th (従四位下)	100,000 koku
4	Matsudaira Tadazane (松平 忠誠)	1863–1869	Shimōsa-no-kami; Jijū (下総守 侍従 )	Lower 4th (従四位下)	100,000 koku
5	Matsudaira Tadanori (松平 忠敬)	1863–1869	-none-	3rd (従三位)	100,000 koku
