= Komine Castle =

Japanese castle

- 小峰城
- Shirakawa, Fukushima Prefecture, Japan
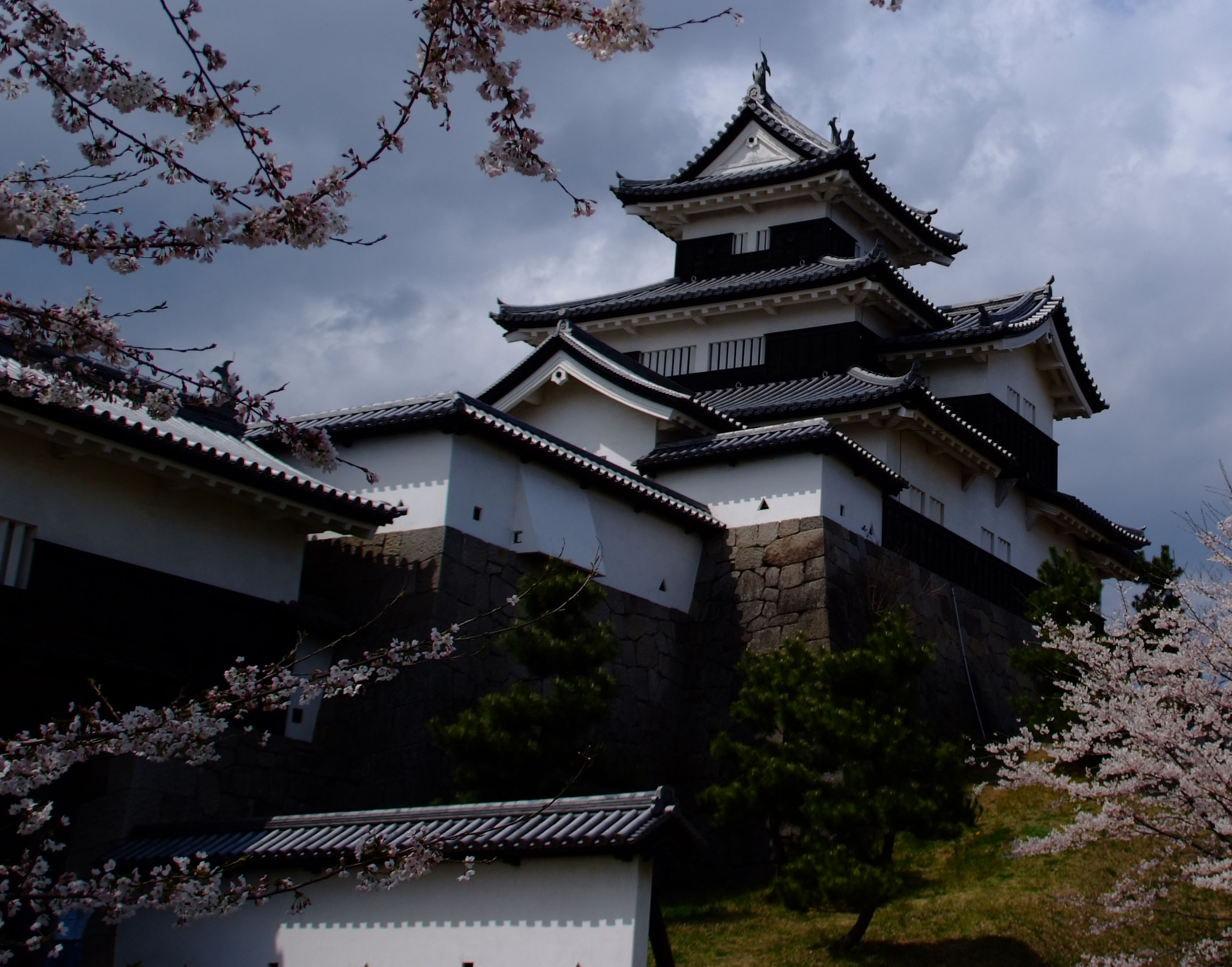
- Reconstructed tenshu of Komine Castle

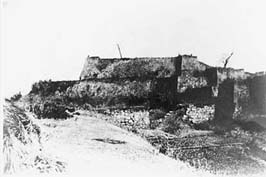
- Ruined Komine Castle after the Battle of Aizu

Site information
- Type: hilltop-style Japanese castle
- Open to the public: yes
- Condition: partially reconstructed 1991

Location
- Coordinates: 37°07′57″N 140°12′49″E

Site history
- Built: 1340, rebuilt 1632
- Built by: Yūki Chikatomo, Niwa Nagashige
- In use: Muromachi period-1893

Komine Castle (小峰城, Komine-jō) is a Japanese castle located in what is now the city of Shirakawa, southern Fukushima Prefecture, Japan. Throughout the middle to later Edo period, Komine Castle was home to the Abe clan, daimyō of Shirakawa Domain. It was also referred to as Shirakawa-Komine Castle (白河小峰城, Shirakawa Komine-jō) or simply Shirakawa Castle (白河城, Shirakawa-jō). The castle is one of the 100 Fine Castles of Japan, and in 2007 was designated a National Historic Site. It should not be confused with the older Shirakawa Castle also located in Shirakawa, Fukushima, also known as Karame-jō (搦目城) or Yūki-Shirakawa-jō (結城白川城). The castle grounds are also a noted venue for viewing sakura in spring.

== Layout ==
Komine Castle is located on a long and narrow hill extending 500 meters from east to west, located on a bend of the Abukuma River, which forms part of the natural defenses of the site. The Shirakawa area and the Abukuma River are on the main route between the Kantō region and northern Japan, the Ōshū Kaidō, and control of this area was of great strategic importance. The ancient Shirakawa Barrier was once located nearby.

The inner bailey is at end of this hill separated into two layers of enclosures, protected by tall stone walls. At the northeastern corner, was a three-story yagura which substituted for a true tenshu. Along the north and west lines were huge earthen ramparts using portions of the original terrain. South of the inner bailey, protected by a wide water moat, was a secondary enclosure approximately 200 x 100 meters which contained the residence of the lord. There were a number of enclosures outside this core area, forming secondary fortifications. The east side of the castle was further protected by an outer barrier.

== History ==
=== Early history ===
The construction of Komine Castle began in 1340 by Yūki Chikatomo, as a small hilltop fortification with earthen palisades. After the fall of the Satake clan in 1589, the Yūki allied with the Date clan to the north, but were dispossessed in 1590 by Toyotomi Hideyoshi. The Yūki survived as retainers to the Date, and their territory became part of the holdings of Aizu Domain under the Gamō clan. Under the Gamō, Shirakawa Castle was modernized with stone walls. The castle was held by the Gamo until 1627.

=== Edo period ===
After the establishment of the Tokugawa shogunate, Niwa Nagashige was transferred from Tanagura Domain to become daimyō of the newly created 100,000 koku Shirakawa Domain in 1627 and completely rebuilt and expanded Komine Castle between 1628 and 1632. During the remainder of the Edo period, the castle passed through the hands of seven daimyō clans with a total of 21 daimyō (the Niwa, Sakaibara, Honda, three branches of the Matsudaira clan and finally the Abe clan) before reverting to direct control of the Tokugawa shogunate in 1866, on the eve of the Boshin War.

During this period the most famous ruler of Shirakawa was Matsudaira Sadanobu (1759-1829).

=== Bakumatsu to modern era ===
During the Boshin War, Shirakawa was a stronghold of the pro-Tokugawa Ōuetsu Reppan Dōmei and came under attack during the Battle of Aizu by the pro-imperial army of the Satchō Alliance. Although the invading army was outnumbered, it had superior artillery, and Komine Castle had been designed primarily to defend against attacks from the north, so its southern approached were more lightly fortified. The castle fell to the Meiji government on May 1, 1868.

Many of the structures of the castle were destroyed during the battle, and much of what remained, including a large section of its stone walls, were later pulled down following the abolition of the han system. The site was transformed into a public park.

In 1991, a three-story tenshu was reconstructed on the foundations of the original tenshu, and in 1994 one of the gates was restored. These structures (along with some of the stonework and the moats) suffered significant damage during the 2011 Tōhoku earthquake.

An earth wall with uneven stones made up the original base of Komine Castle before it collapsed in the 1970s due to rain. The local government repaired it with concrete and the entire section of the repaired wall was destroyed by the 2011 earthquake due to using concrete. The Japanese government then asked for photographs of the original wall from local citizens as they had no idea what it looked like to repair it to its original state.

== See also ==
- List of Historic Sites of Japan (Fukushima)

== Literature ==
- Schmorleitz, Morton S. (1974). Castles in Japan. Tokyo: Charles E. Tuttle Co. pp. 144–145. ISBN 0-8048-1102-4.
- De Lange, William (2021). An Encyclopedia of Japanese Castles. Groningen: Toyo Press. p. 600. ISBN 978-9492722300.
- Motoo, Hinago (1986). Japanese Castles. Tokyo: Kodansha. p. 200 pages. ISBN 0-87011-766-1.
- Mitchelhill, Jennifer (2004). Castles of the Samurai: Power and Beauty. Tokyo: Kodansha. p. 112 pages. ISBN 4-7700-2954-3.
- Turnbull, Stephen (2003). Japanese Castles 1540-1640. Osprey Publishing. p. 64 pages. ISBN 1-84176-429-9.
