= Abe Masatō =

Abe Masatō 阿部正外
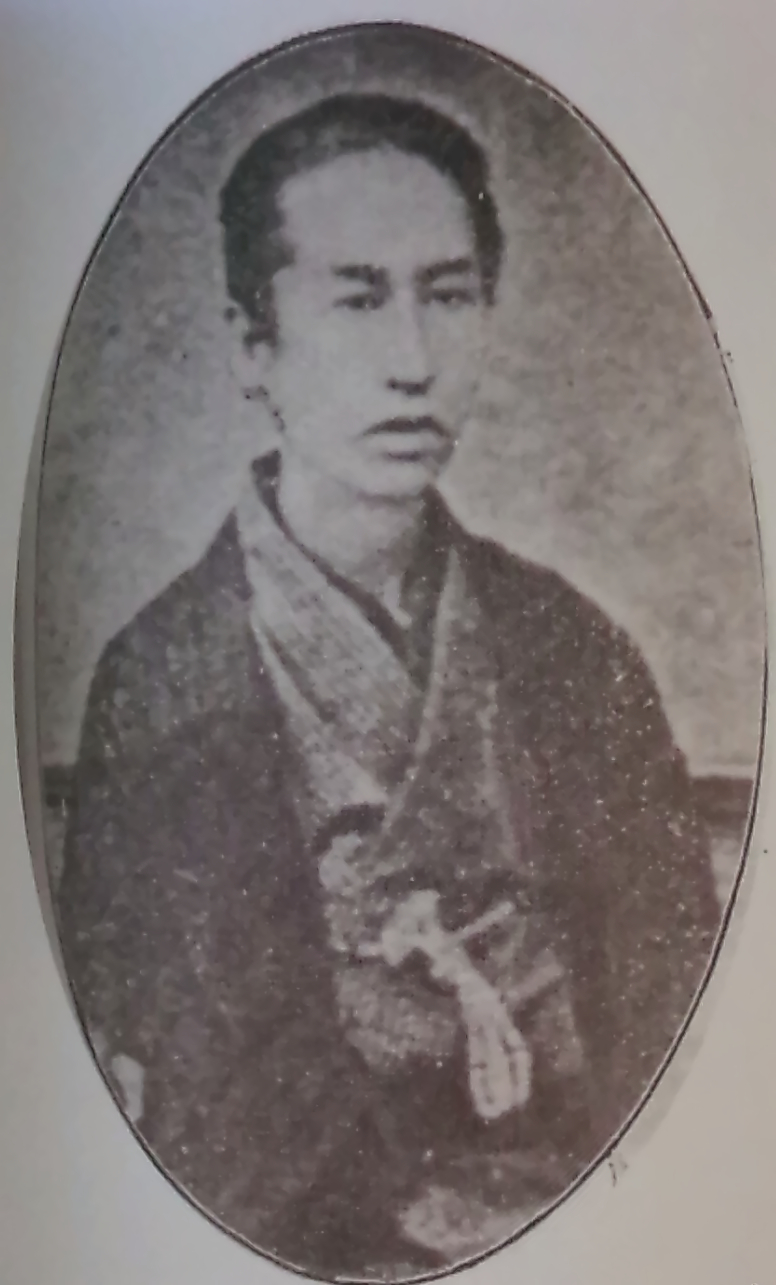
- Abe Masatō

Personal details
- Born: February 15, 1828
- Died: April 20, 1887 (aged 59) Tokyo, Japan
- Parent: Abe Shōzō (father)
- Occupation: Daimyō of Shirakawa Domain

Abe Masatō (阿部正外; February 15, 1828 – April 20, 1887) was the 7th Abe daimyō of Shirakawa Domain, and an important official in the Bakumatsu period Tokugawa shogunate.

== Early life as a hatamoto ==
Masatō was born the younger son of Abe Shōzō, a 3000 koku hatamoto retainer of Shirakawa Domain, and inherited this post when his elder brother Abe Masasada was selected to become daimyō of Shirakawa. In 1859, he was selected by the Tairō Ii Naosuke as a secret agent to arrange for the wedding between Princess Kazunomiya and Shōgun Tokugawa Iemochi as part of Ii's Kōbu gattai strategy. In 1861, he became Kanagawa bugyō, where he had to work with the various foreign diplomats and oversee the delicate relations between Japan and the various Western powers, including the diplomatic crisis caused by the 1862 Namamugi incident. The same year, he was promoted to Gaikoku bugyō, and the following year was advanced to the post of Edo Kita Machi-bugyō.

== Later career as a daimyō and Shogunate official ==
In 1864, on the sudden death of Abe Masahisa, he was ordered by the shōgunate to become daimyō of Shirakawa, and a couple of months later was appointed both sōshaban and Jisha-bugyō, and only days later was appointed a rōjū. In this role, he played a leading role in the negotiations involving the creation of the port and foreign settlement at Yokohama. He also ordered the modernisation of Shirakawa's military forces along western lines and its rearmament with modern rifles.

In early 1865, Abe went to Kyoto at the head of an army of 4000 troops to arrange for the meeting between Shōgun Tokugawa Iemochi and Emperor Kōmei and to suppress pro-sonnō jōi rōnin in the area. He returned again three months later as part of the train of Shōgun Tokugawa Iemochi, and was joined by 1200 troops from Shirakawa, who arrived by sea and were garrisoned in Osaka. Although it was widely expected that he would led these forces in the Second Chōshū expedition, Abe came under pressure from the United Kingdom, France and the Netherlands for the opening of a port and foreign settlement at Hyōgo, as per the terms of treaties already signed. The opening of Hyōgō was vehemently opposed by Emperor Kōmei and the anti-treaty faction within the shogunate, and after Abe gave in to the foreign demands, he was fired from his office by Iemochi under pressure from Emperor Kōmei. Abe returned to Edo and from there to Shirakawa, where he was placed under house arrest and order to turn the post of daimyō to his son, Abe Masakiyo. The following year, he was punished further when the Abe clan was ordered to relocate to Tanagura Domain. The clan stalled for a year, and even after moving to Tanagura, managed to recover Shirakawa for a month before the start of the Boshin War. Both Shirakawa and Tanagura were members of the Ōuetsu Reppan Dōmei, but both domains were quickly overrun by the troops of the new Meiji government. Abe died in Tokyo in 1887 and his grave is at the Tama Cemetery in Fuchū, Tokyo.

Preceded by Abe Masahisa	7th Abe Daimyō of Shirakawa; 1864-1866, 1868	Succeeded by Abe Masakiyo
