= Shirakawa Barrier =

Frontier fortification in Fukushima, Japan

- 白河の関 (Japanese)
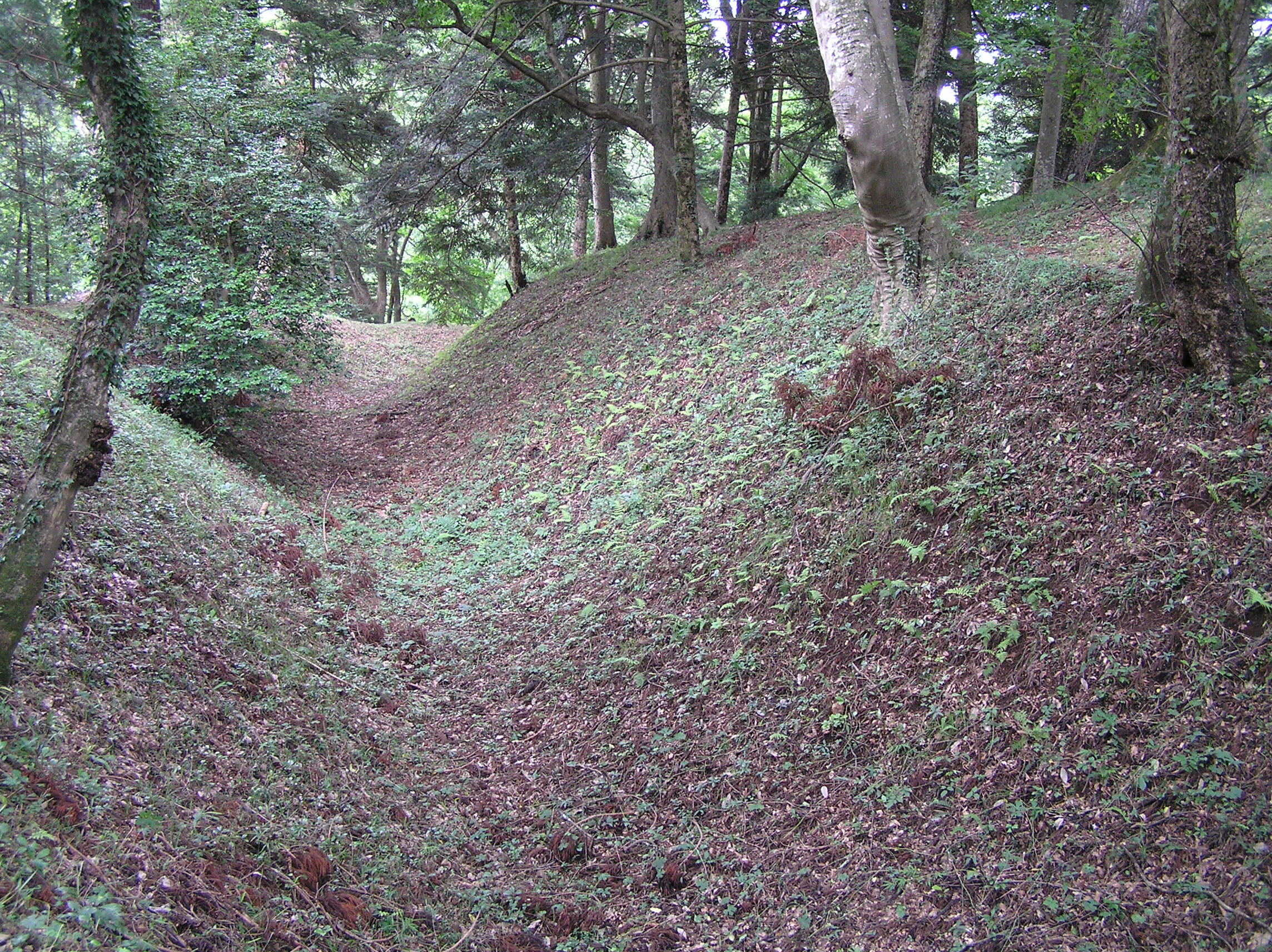
- Remnant of moat of Shirakawa Barrier

- Location within Fukushima Prefecture Location within Japan
- 37°2′49.1″N 140°13′43.6″E
- Type: fortification
- Location: Shirakawa, Fukushima, Japan
- Region: Tōhoku region

History
- Built: Nara period

Site notes
- Excavation dates: 1956-1963
- Owner: National Historic Site
- Public access: Yes

The Shirakawa Barrier (白河の関, Shirakawa no seki) is the location of a frontier fortification on the Ōshū Kaidō highway in what is now the Hatajuku neighborhood of the city of Shirakawa, Fukushima Japan, three kilometers south of the border of Tochigi Prefecture. The site was designated a National Historic Site in 1966., and is part of the Shirakawa Seki-no-mori Park, containing a reconstructed ancient house and preserved old farm houses.

== History ==
The barrier is one of three built during the Nara period to mark the border between the territory controlled by the Yamato state and the Emishi tribes of the Tōhoku region of northern Honshū, although there is archaeological evidence to show that it may actually date to as early as the latter half of the 5th century in the Kofun period. Its first appearance in historical records is dated December 3, 835, at which time the barrier is mentioned to be four hundred years old. The barrier served as a border fortress against excursions of the Emishi to the south, and to regulate and control traffic from the central provinces of Japan to the north. During the Nara period, it marked the northern border of Yamato control.

By the early to mid-Heian period, Yamato forces gradually conquered the Emishi, and the barrier fell into ruin as it had become redundant. It had largely vanished by the start of the Kamakura period. However, memory of the barrier was preserved as an utamakura in Japanese poetry, metaphorically evoking images of distance, transition and loneliness. The site was lost until the mid-Edo period, when it was rediscovered by Matsudaira Sadanobu, daimyō of Shirakawa Domain based on a study of ancient texts in the year 1800. He marked the location with a stone monument and the construction of a Shinto shrine, the Shirakawa Jinja.

The site was excavated by archaeologists from 1956 to 1963, and the remains of a dry moat, a double wooden palisade and earthen ramparts were uncovered, along with the foundations of pit dwellings and blacksmith workshops.

== See also ==
- List of Historic Sites of Japan (Fukushima)
