= Abe Masakoto =

Japanese daimyō (1860–1925)

Viscount Abe Masakoto
- 阿部正静
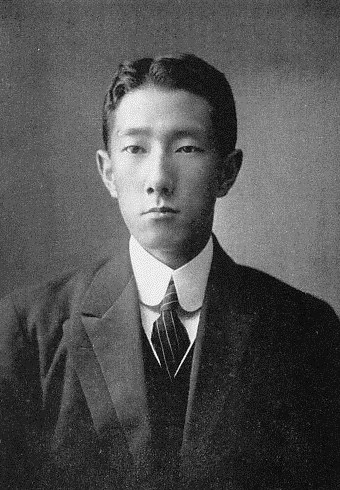
- Abe Masakoto (in 1913)

2nd Daimyō of Tanagura Domain
- In office 1868–1869
- Monarch: Emperor Meiji
- Preceded by: Abe Masakiyo
- Succeeded by: < position abolished >

Imperial Governor of Tanagura
- In office 1869–1871

Personal details
- Born: February 14, 1860 Edo, Japan
- Died: September 11, 1925 (aged 65) Tokyo, Japan
- Spouse(s): Teruko, daughter of Tokudaiji Kin'ito
- Parent: Abe Masahisa (father)

Abe Masakoto (阿部正功; February 14, 1860 – September 11, 1925) was the 2nd (and final) Abe daimyō of Tanagura Domain.

== Biography ==
Abe Masakoto was the son of Abe Masahisa, 6th daimyō of Shirakawa Domain, and was born to a maid at the domain's Edo residence. Due to his low birth and as he was only an infant when his father died, the position of daimyō when to a cadet branch of the family in the form of Abe Masakiyo. Abe Masakiyo was transferred from Shirakawa Domain to Tanagura Domain by the Tokugawa shogunate. However, following the defeat of the Ōuetsu Reppan Dōmei during the Boshin War, the victorious Meiji government reduced the kokudaka of Tanagura from 100,000 to 60,000 koku, and forced Abe Masakiyo into retirement. Abe Masakoto, at the age of seven was appointed daimyō of Tanagura. However, only six months later, with the abolition of the han system, the position of daimyō was abolished, and he became Imperial governor of Tanagura. During his short tenure, he authorized the formation of a han school.

In 1871, Tanagura was absorbed into the new Fukushima Prefecture, and Abe Masakoto relocated to Tokyo. From 1873, he enrolled in Keio University. He also invested heavily in land in the Azabu neighborhood of Tokyo and was a major shareholder in the No.15 Bank. He also learned English and was an avid amateur archaeologist. In 1884, he received the kazoku peerage title of shishaku (viscount). His wife Teruko is the younger sister of Tokudaiji Kin'ito.
