= Shirakawa Domain =

Feudal domain under the Tokugawa shogunate of Edo period Japan

Shirakawa Domain 白河藩
- under Tokugawa shogunate Japan
- 1627–1868
- Capital: Komine Castle
- Area
  - Coordinates: 37°07′57″N 140°12′49″E
  - Type: Daimyō
- Historical era: Edo period
  - Established: 1627
  - Niwa: 1627
  - Sakakibara: 1647
  - Honda: 1649
  - Matsudaira: 1681
  - Abe: 1823
  - Disestablished: 1868
- Today part of: part of Fukushima Prefecture

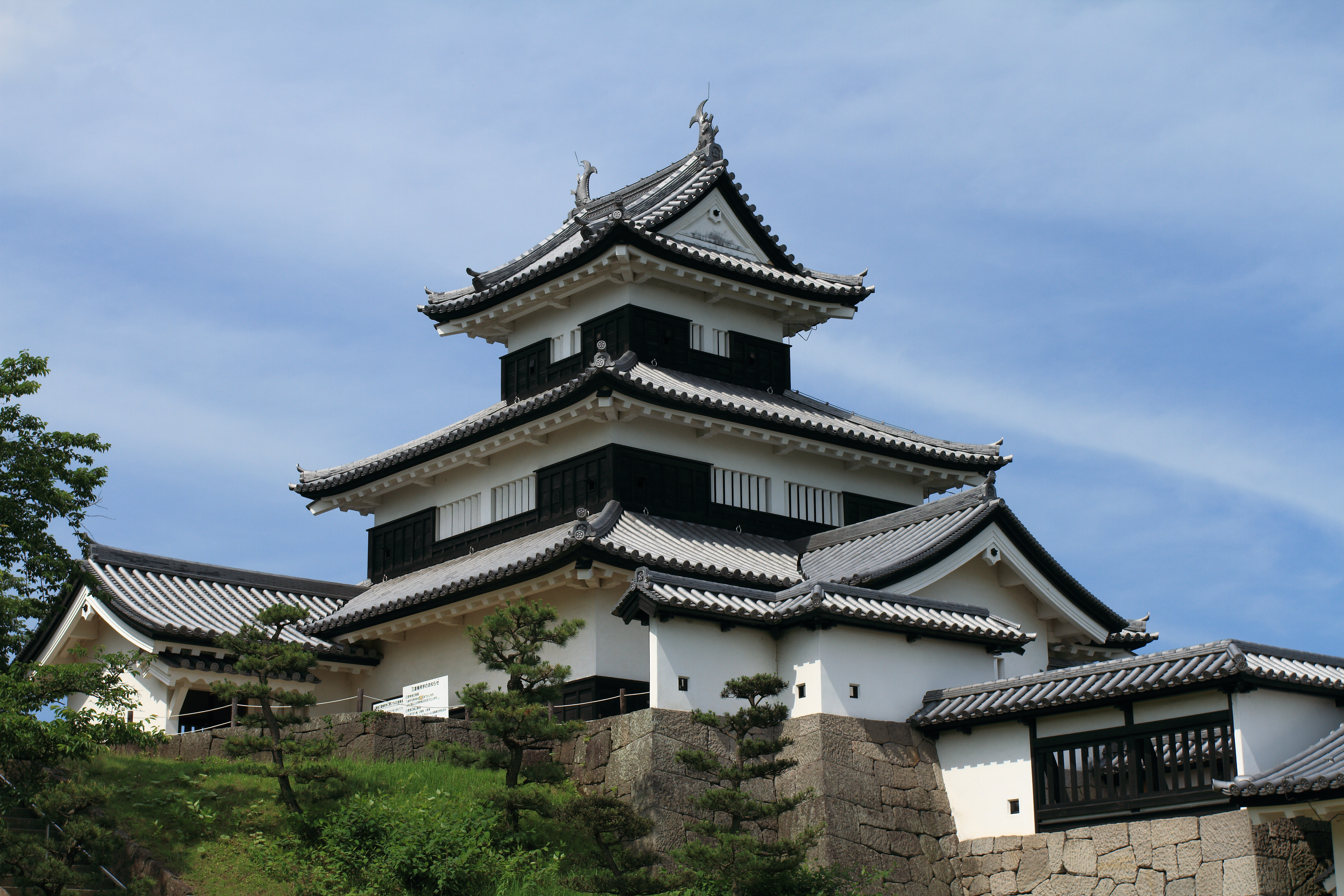
Komine Castle

Shirakawa Domain (白河藩, Shirakawa-han) was a feudal domain under the Tokugawa shogunate of Edo period Japan, located in southern Mutsu Province. It was centered on Komine Castle in what is now the city of Shirakawa, Fukushima. Its most famous ruler was Matsudaira Sadanobu, the architect of the Kansei Reforms. It was also the scene of one of the battles of the Boshin War of the Meiji restoration.

== History ==
The Shirakawa Barrier was noted from the Nara period as the border between the “settled” regions of Japan proper, and the “frontier” regions of northern Japan, and was of great strategic importance. During the Sengoku period, the area around Shirakawa was controlled by the rulers of Aizu.

In 1627, Niwa Nagashige, one of Tokugawa Ieyasu's generals, was transferred from Tanakura Domain to the newly established Shirakawa Domain, with a kokudaka of 100,700 koku. He built Komine Castle, and established the surrounding castle town. He was followed by his son, Niwa Mitsushige in 1637, but the clan was transferred to Nihonmatsu Domain in 1647.

The Niwa were replaced by Sakakibara Tadatsugu from Tatebayashi Domain, with an increase to 140,000 koku. Tadatsugu's mother was one of Ieyasu's concubines, and for a time he adopted the Matsudaira surname. However, his tenure at Shirakawa was short, and he was transferred to Himeji Domain in 1649.

The domain was then assigned to Honda Tadayoshi, formerly of Murakami Domain, and its size was reduced to 120,000 koku. Tadayoshi placed strong efforts into the development of new rice lands, raising his actual revenues by an additional 15,000 koku . In the 1650-1651 period, his actual revenues were 37,000 koku higher than his official rating. However, this disparity and complaints from his subjects on harsh and excessive taxation, led to his son, Honda Tadahira, being transferred to Utsunomiya Domain in 1681.

Shirakawa was then assigned to Matsudaira (Okudaira) Tadahiro, but he was in poor health and assigned running the domain to his karō. Furthermore, the early death of his sons led to an O-Ie Sōdō which divided his retainers between a faction favoring a son-in-law and a faction favoring a grandson. His inability to resolve this crisis resulted in his demotion and replacement by another branch of the Matsudaira clan.

Matsudaira (Echizen) Naonori became daimyō of Shirakawa in 1692 and initially implemented plans to repair the domain's finances through fiscal restraint and reduction of the income of his retainers. These policies were reversed in 1720 by the powerful Toki-faction within the clan, whose solution to the domain's finances was a drastic increase in taxation. This resulted in a major peasant uprising. Naonori's successor, Motochika, initiated a suggestion box, and his successor Yoshichika was transferred to Himeji Domain in 1741.

Shirakawa then came under yet another branch of the Matsudaira clan, with the appointment of Matsudaira (Hisamatsu) Tadayoshi. His adopted grandson, Matsudaira Sadanobu was immediately faced with his domain's economically disastrous position: of 110,000 koku that it was supposed to be able to produce, 108,600 had been reported "lost". Sadanobu worked ceaselessly to fix the economic situation in Shirakawa, finally saving it and bringing its finances and agriculture back to stability. These reforms, coupled with Sadanobu's continued political maneuvering, brought him fame, and he was named chief councilor of the Shōgunate in the summer of 1787, and regent to the 11th shōgun Tokugawa Ienari early the following year. This period of Sadanobu's strengthening of the already faltering Tokugawa regime is known as the Kansei Reforms. His son, Matsudaira Sadanaga, was transferred to Kuwana Domain.

Shirakawa was then assigned to the Abe clan of Oshi Domain, who ruled over eight generations to the Meiji restoration. The 7th daimyō, Abe Masatō, rose to the post of rōjū, and played an important role in the opening of Japan. He overcame the objections of the sonnō jōi party, and negotiated the opening of Hyōgo Port to the foreigners, but this act precipitated his forced retirement and loss of 40,000 koku. During the Bakumatsu period, the 8th and final daimyō, Abe Masakiyo, was transferred to Tanakura Domain in 1866. Shirakawa then became tenryō territory administered directly by the Tokugawa shogunate, but the Boshin War began before a new daimyō could be appointed. Shirakawa joined the Ōuetsu Reppan Dōmei and Abe Masakiyo returned briefly in 1868, but the castle was destroyed by Satchō Alliance forces during the Battle of Aizu in the Boshin War.

After the end of the conflict, Shirakawa Domain was dissolved in December 1868, and became Shirakawa Prefecture in August 1869. After the abolition of the han system in July 1871, it became part of “Nihonmatsu Prefecture”, which later became part of Fukushima Prefecture.

== Holdings at the end of the Edo period ==
As with most domains in the han system, Shirakawa Domain consisted of several discontinuous territories calculated to provide the assigned kokudaka, based on periodic cadastral surveys and projected agricultural yields.

- Mutsu Province (Iwashiro Province)
  - 63 villages in Shirakawa District
  - 2 villages in Iwase District
- Tōtōmi Province
  - 15 villages in Yamana District
  - 18 villages in Toyoda District
  - 3 villages in Aratama District
  - 4 villages in Inasa District
- Shinano Province
  - 36 villages in Ina District

== List of daimyō ==
#	Name	Tenure	Courtesy title	Court Rank	kokudaka
Niwa clan (tozama) 1627-1643
1	Niwa Nagashige (丹羽長重)	1627–1637	Kaga-no-kami (加賀守); Sangi (参議)	Lower 4th (従四位下)	120,000 koku
2	Niwa Mitsushige (丹羽光重)	1637–1643	Saikyō-daifū (左京大夫), Jijū (侍従)	Lower 4th (従四位下)	120,000 koku
Sakakibara clan (fudai) 1643–1649
1	Sakakibara Tadatsugu (榊原忠次)	1643–1649	Shikibu-daisuke (式部大輔); Jijū (侍従)	Lower 4th (従四位下)	140,000 koku
Honda clan (fudai) 1649-1681
1	Honda Tadayoshi (本多忠義)	1649–1662	Noto-no-kami (能登守)	Junior 4th Rank, Lower Grade (従四位下)	120,000 koku
2	Honda Tadahiro (本多忠平)	1662–1681	Noto-no-kami (能登守)	Junior 5th Rank, Lower Grade (従五位下)	120,000 koku
Matsudaira clan (Okudaira) (shimpan) 1681-1691
1	Matsudaira Tadahiro (松平(奥平)忠弘)	1681–1692	Shimōsa-no-kami (下総守) Jijū (侍従)	Junior 4th Rank, Lower Grade (従四位下)	150,000 koku
Matsudaira clan (Echizen) (shimpan) 1692-1741
1	Matsudaira Naonori (松平(越前)直矩)	1692–1695	Yamato-no-kami (大和守); Jijū (侍従)	Junior 4th Rank, Lower Grade (従四位下)	150,000 koku
2	Matsudaira Motochika (松平(越前)基知)	1695–1729	Yamato-no-kami (大和守); Jijū (侍従)	Junior 4th Rank, Lower Grade (従四位下)	150,000 koku
3	Matsudaira Akinori (松平(越前)明矩)	1729–1741	Yamato-no-kami (大和守);Jijū (侍従)	Junior 4th Rank, Lower Grade (従四位下))	150,000 koku
Matsudaira clan (Hisamatsu) (shimpan) 1741-1823
1	Matsudaira Sadayoshi (松平(久松)定)	1741–1770	Etchū-no-kami (越中守)	Junior 4th Rank, Lower Grade (従四位下)	110,000 koku
2	Matsudaira Sadakuni (松平(久松)定邦)	1770–1783	Etchū-no-kami (越中守)	Junior 4th Rank, Lower Grade (従四位下)	110,000 koku
3	Matsudaira Sadanobu (松平(久松)定信)	1783–1812	Etchū-no-kami (越中守); Sashōshō (左少将)	Junior 4th Rank, Lower Grade (従四位下)	110,000 koku
4	Matsudaira Sadanaga (松平(久松)定永)	1812–1823	Etchū-no-kami (越中守)	Junior 4th Rank, Lower Grade (従四位下)	110,000 koku
Abe clan (fudai) 1823-1866
1	Abe Masanori (阿部正権)	1823–1823	-none-	-none-	100,000 koku
2	Abe Masaatsu (阿部正篤)	1823–1831	Hida-no-kami (飛騨守)	Junior 5th Rank, Lower Grade (従五位下)	100,000 koku
3	Abe Masaakira (阿部正瞭)	1831–1838	Noto-no-kami (能登守)	Junior 5th Rank, Lower Grade (従五位下)	100,000 koku
4	Abe Masakata (阿部正備)	1838–1848	Etchū-no-kami (越中守)	Junior 5th Rank, Lower Grade (従五位下)	100,000 koku
5	Abe Masasada (阿部正定)	1848–1848	-none-	-none-	100,000 koku
6	Abe Masahisa (阿部正耆)	1848–1864	Harima-no-kami (播磨守); Jijū (侍従)	Junior 4th Rank, Lower Grade (従四位下)	100,000 koku
7	Abe Masatō (阿部正外)	1864–1866	Buzen-no-kami (豊前守): Jijū (侍従)	Junior 4th Rank, Lower Grade (従四位下)	100,000 koku
8	Abe Masakiyo (阿部正静)	1866–1866	Mimasaka-no-kami (美作守)	Junior 5th Rank, Lower Grade (従五位下)	100,000 -> 60,000 koku

=== Abe Masanori ===
Abe Masanori (阿部正権, February 26, 1806 – November 8, 1823) was the 9th Abe daimyō of Oshi Domain and the first Abe daimyō of Shirakawa Masanori was the second son of Abe Masayoshi. When he was three years old, his father died and he became daimyō. However, because of his age and feeble health, his mother took over the administration of the domain and Masanori was placed under the guardianship of Abe Masakiyo, daimyō of Fukuyama Domain. In 1822, the Tokugawa shogunate issued a decree rotating the daimyō of Oshi, Kuwana and Shirakawa Domains. Masanori was ordered to relocate to Shirakawa, but in the midst of this move he died. The succession passed to his cousin Abe Masaatsu.

=== Abe Masaatsu ===
Abe Masaatsu (阿部正篤, October 10, 1801 - April 16, 1843) was the 2nd Abe daimyō of Shirakawa Domain. He was the son of Matsudaira Yorioki, the 5th son of Tokugawa Munemasa of Wakayama Domain and was posthumously adopted as heir to his cousin Abe Masanori. His courtesy title was Hida-no-kami, and his court rank was Junior Fifth Rank, Lower Grade. His wife was a daughter of Shimazu Narinobu of Satsuma Domain. As with his cousin, he was also of weak constitution, and retired in 1831 after adopting Abe Masaakira as his heir. He died in 1843 and his grave is at the temple of Saifuku-ji in Kurumae, Tokyo.

=== Abe Masaakira ===
Abe Masaakira (阿部正瞭, September 14, 1813 - May 3, 1838) was the 3rd Abe daimyō of Shirakawa Domain. He was the 14th son of Matsudaira Nobuakira of Yoshida Domain and was adopted as heir to Abe Masaatsu. His courtesy title was Noto-no-kami, and his court rank was Junior Fifth Rank, Lower Grade. His wife was a daughter of Nagai Naotomo of Takatsuka Domain. Noted for his intelligence, he served as sōshaban in 1836 and Jisha-bugyōin 1837. Although he appeared to have a bright future, he also had weak health and died in 1838. His grave is at the temple of Saifuku-ji in Kurumae, Tokyo.

=== Abe Masakata ===
Abe Masakata (阿部正備, July 27, 1823 - April 11, 1874) was the 4th Abe daimyō of Shirakawa Domain. He was the 4th son of Ōmura Sumiyoshi of Ōmura Domain and was posthumous adopted as heir to Abe Masaakira. His courtesy title was Noto-no-kami, and his court rank was Junior Fifth Rank, Lower Grade. His wife was a daughter of Naitō Yoriyasu of Takatō Domain. He served as sōshaban in 1847, but retired the following year. He lived into the Meiji period and died in 1874. His grave is at the temple of Saifuku-ji in Kurumae, Tokyo.

=== Abe Masasada ===
Abe Masasada (阿部正定, November 28, 1823 - September 22, 1848) was the 5th Abe daimyō of Shirakawa Domain. He was the eldest son of Abe Shōzō, a 3000 koku hatamoto retainer of Shirakawa Domain, and was adopted as heir to Abe Masakata. However, he died only three months after taking office. As he had no heir, his death was kept secret from the authorities until Abe Masahisa could be summoned from Fukuyama Domain and proclaimed heir. Masasada's death was announced on the same day. Masasada's grave is at the temple of Saifuku-ji in Kurumae, Tokyo.

=== Abe Masahisa ===
Abe Masahisa (阿部正耆, December 12, 1827 - April 7, 1864) was the 6th Abe daimyō of Shirakawa Domain. He was the nephew of Abe Masayasu of Fukuyama Domain and was posthumous adopted as heir to Abe Masasada. His courtesy title was Harima-no-kami, and his court rank was Junior Fourth Rank, Lower Grade. He served as sōshaban in 1849. In 1863, he assisted Matsudaira Katamori in the policing of Kyoto and surrounding areas. However, he fell ill and died the following year in 1864. His grave is at the temple of Saifuku-ji in Kurumae, Tokyo.

=== Abe Masato ===
Abe Masatō (阿部正外, February 15, 1828 – April 20, 1887) was the 7th Abe daimyō of Shirakawa Domain, and an important official in the Bakumatsu period Tokugawa shogunate. Masatō was the younger son of Abe Shōzō, a 3000 koku hatamoto retainer of Shirakawa Domain, and inherited this post when his elder brother Abe Masada was selected to become daimyō of Shirakawa. In 1859, he helped arrange for the wedding between Princess Kazunomiya and Shōgun Tokugawa Iemochi. In 1861, he became Kanagawa bugyō, and the same year, he was promoted to Gaikoku bugyō, and the following year to Edo Kita Machi-bugyō. In 1864, on the death of Abe Masahisa, he became daimyō of Shirakawa, and a couple of months later was appointed both sōshaban and Jisha-bugyō, and only days later was appointed a rōjū. In this role, he played a leading role in the negotiations involving the creation of the port and foreign settlements at Yokohama, and Hyōgo. The opening of Hyōgō was vehemently opposed by Emperor Kōmei and the anti-treaty faction within the shogunate, and after Abe gave in to the foreign demands, he was fired from his office. placed under house arrest. The post of daimyō went to his son, Abe Masakiyo. He died in Tokyo in 1887.

=== Abe Masakiyo ===
Abe Masakiyo (阿部正静, January 11, 1850 - January 23, 1878) was the 8th (and final) Abe daimyō of Shirakawa Domain, and the 1st Abe daimyō of Tanagura Domain. He was the eldest son of Abe Masatō. His courtesy title was Mimasaka-no-kami, and his court rank was Junior Fifth Rank, Lower Grade. In 1864, when his father was adopted to succeed Abe Masahisa, he inherited his father's 3000 koku hatamoto holding. However, in 1866, when his father was forced into retirement for his actions in the opening of the port of Hyōgo to foreign trade, Masakiyo was named daimyō of Shirakawa. The very same day, he was transferred to Tanagura and Shirakawa Domain became tenryō territory under direct control of the Shogunate. Although he protested the move, and later petitioned to return to Shirakawa, he was allowed to return for less than a month before Komine Castle was again taken from him, and placed under the control of Nihonmatsu Domain. The castle was garrisoned by troops of the Ōuetsu Reppan Dōmei during the Boshin War. In 1868, the castle fell to the Meiji government during the Battle of Shirakawa, and Tanagura fell shortly afterwards to forces led by Itagaki Taisuke. Masakiyo was sent under house arrest together with his son to Tokyo, where he died in 1878.
