= Nihonmatsu Lantern Festival =

Festival held in Nihonmatsu, Fukushima, Japan

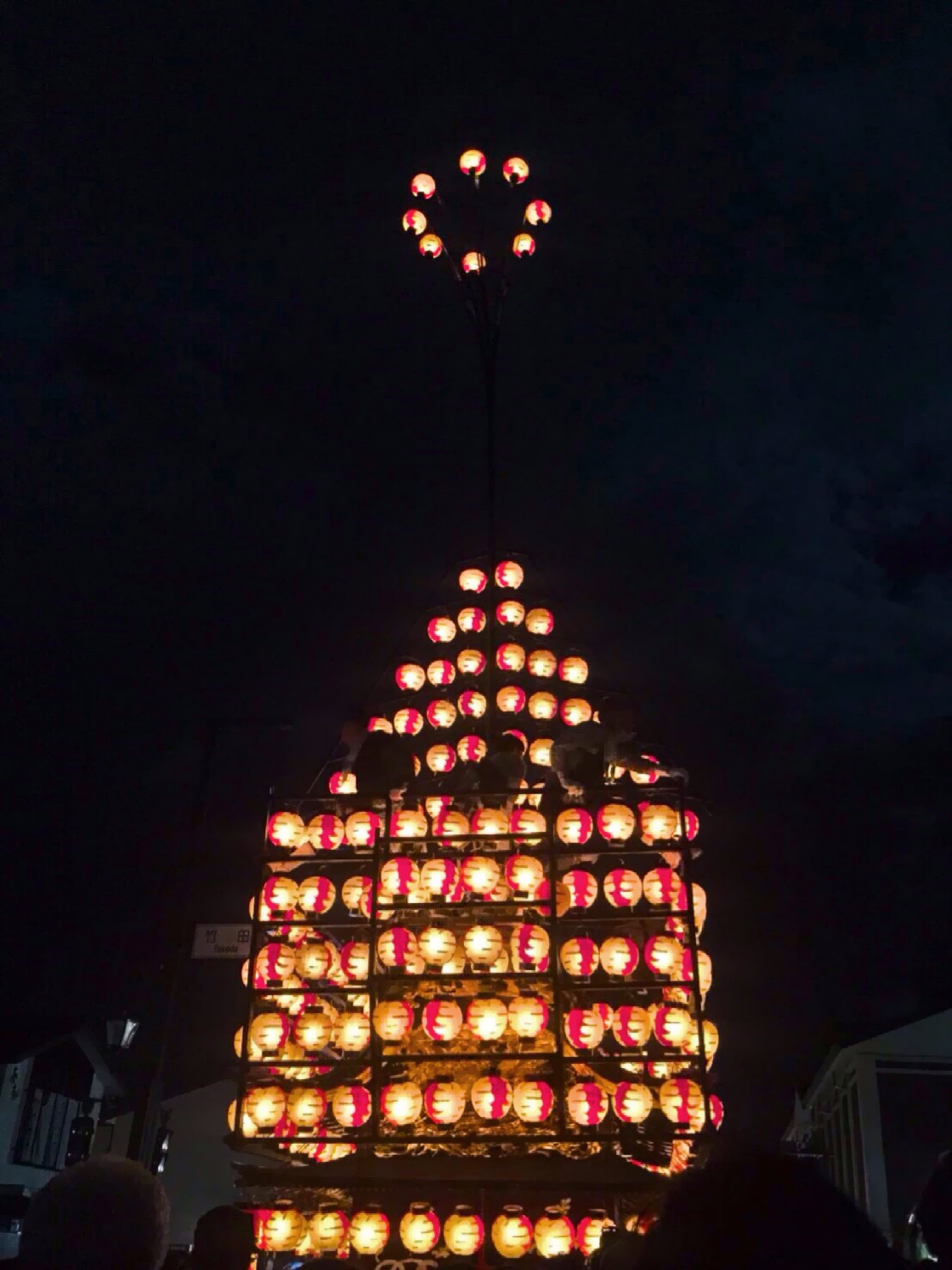
- Nihonmatsu Lantern Festival
- Official name: 二本松の提灯祭り
- Observed by: Nihonmatsu, Fukushima, Japan
- Type: Religious
- Begins: 1st Saturday of October
- Ends: 2nd Monday of October
- Date: Three day

Nihonmatsu Lantern Festival(二本松の提灯祭り Nihonmatsu-chochinmatsuri) is a Japanese traditional festival, located in Nihonmatsu, Fukushima, Japan.

== History ==
Nihonmatsu Lantern Festival is one of Japan's three Lantern festivals along with Akita Kanto, Akita and Owari Tshima Tenno, Aichi. Niwa Mitsushige instituted the festival in 1664.

== See also ==
- Lantern Festival, a Chinese festival celebrated on the fifteenth day of the Chinese New Year
- Nihonmatsu, Fukushima
- Nihonmatsu Castle
- Nihonmatsu Shonentai
