= Battle of Asai =

1600 battle in Japan

- Part of Sekigahara campaign
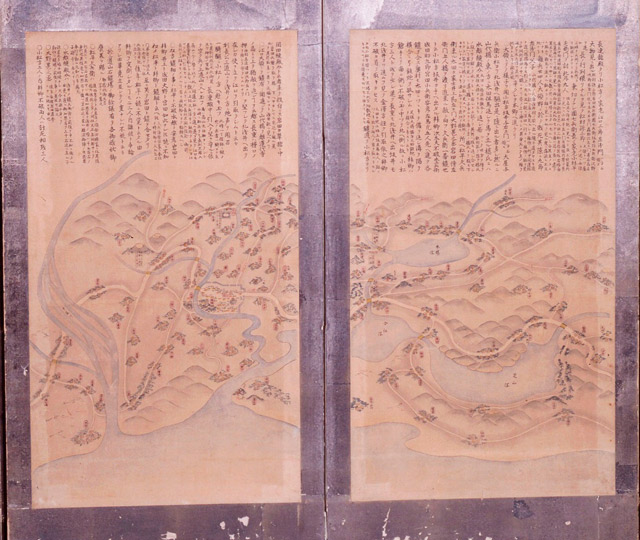
- The Battle of Asai screen (six-panel screen), Ishikawa Prefectural Museum of History
Date	1600
Location	Hokuriku region
Result	Tactical victory for Niwa Nagashige

Belligerents
Maeda clan	Niwa clan

Commanders and leaders
Maeda Toshinaga	Niwa Nagashige

Strength
25,000	3,000

Battle of Asai (浅井畷の戦い, Asai nawate no Tatakai) was a battle during Sekigahara campaign in 1600 AD that took place in the Hokuriku region between Maeda Toshinaga, the daimyo of Kaga Domain, against Niwa Nagashige, head of Niwa clan.

== Background ==
After Toyotomi Hideyoshi 's death in 1598, Tokugawa Ieyasu rose to power, competing for the position of next ruler of Japan. In response to this, in 1600, Ishida Mitsunari , one of the Toyotomi's five magistrates, and Otani Yoshitsugu boldly raised an army against Tokugawa Ieyasu and his Eastern Army, who at the time on their way heading to Aizu.

As the conflict broke out between Ieyasu and Mitsunari, many daimyo lords take different sides, with Maeda Toshinaga supported Ieyasu, while Niwa Nagashige supported Mitsunari. The two opposing forces' met in The Asai field, in the city of Komatsu, Ishikawa Prefecture.

== Battle ==
Battle of Asai historical site
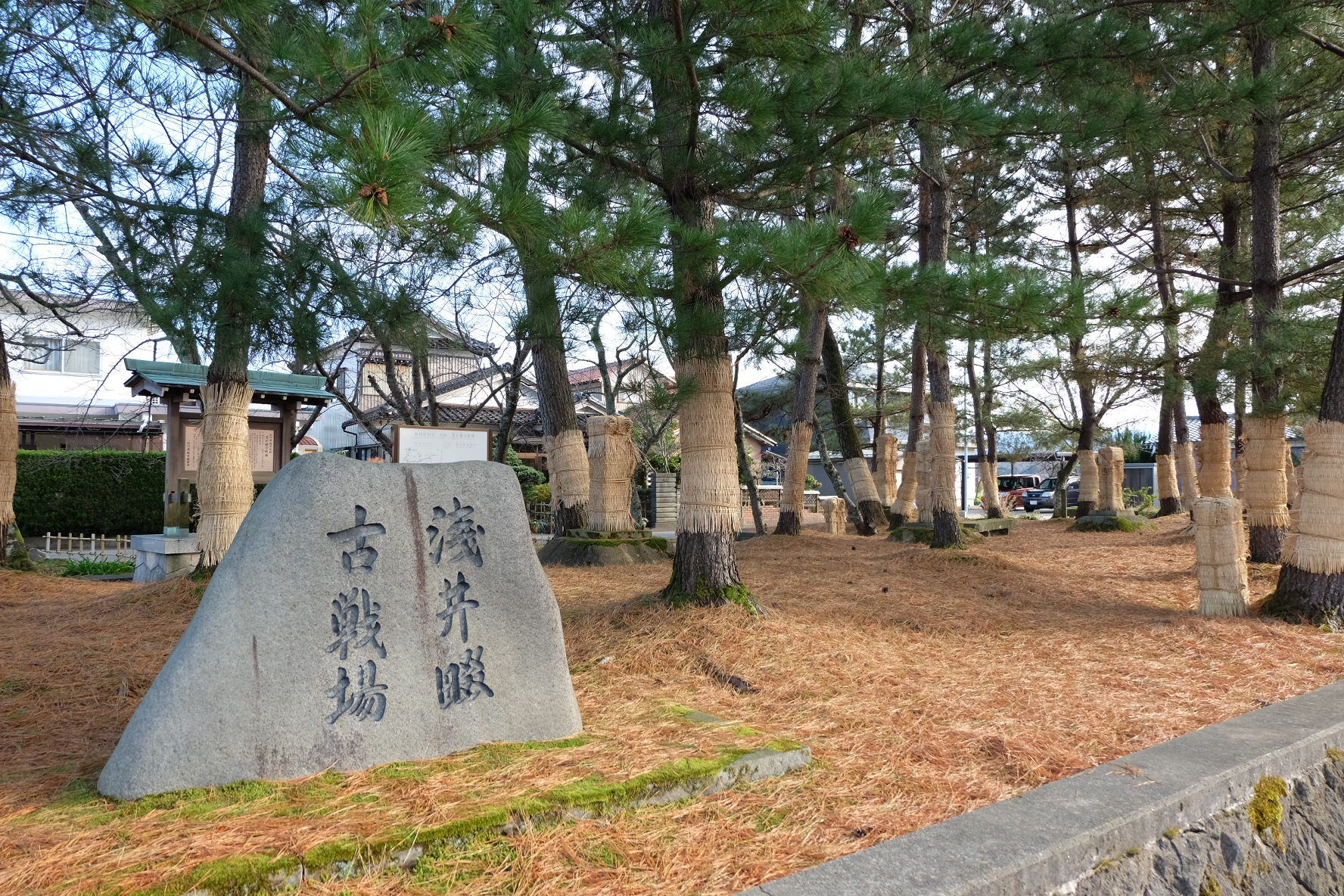
- Interactive map of Battle of Asai historical site
- Location: Oyoryomachi, Komatsu City, Ishikawa Prefecture

Site notes
- Area: 420 m^{2} (designated area) (North-south 30 meters, east-west 17 meters)

On August 9, as the Maeda army marched through the constricted Asai Nawate, Eguchi Masayoshi's hidden Niwa troops struck. The narrow terrain prevented the Maeda forces from deploying effectively, inflicting heavy losses. Despite this, generals Naga Tsunetatsu and Yamazaki Naganori rallied the troops, repelled the Niwa force's attack, and managed a retreat to Kanazawa.

At this time, Toshinaga's younger brother, Maeda Toshimasa, who had participated in the previous battle, remained holed up in his castle, Nanao Castle, and did not helping his brother. It is said that Toshimasa had long been advocating joining the Western Army, in contrast with his brother, who fought on the side of the Eastern Army.

Nine of the subordinate officers of Chō Tsuratatsu, vassal of the Maeda clan who was the rear guard of the Maeda army, were killed in the Battle of Azai-nawate, and stone monuments for them have been erected at the battlefield.

== Aftermath ==
At the end of August, Toshinaga was ordered by Tokugawa Ieyasu once again took action to advance into Mino Province. Meanwhile, Niwa Nagashige ultimately surrendered to Toshinaga.

After the Western Army of Ishida Mitsunari was defeated in the main battle on September 15, the daimyo of Echizen and southern Kaga that accused of supporting the Western Army such as Nagashige and Toshimasa, were stripped of their from their domains by Ieyasu. However, Nagashige was pardoned from execution due to the intercession of Toshinaga.

== Bibliography ==
- Mise Kazuo (2010). "関ヶ原合戦前夜の北陸と前田利長―慶長五年九月五日付前田利長書状― (Hokuriku and Maeda Toshinaga on the eve of the Battle of Sekigahara – A letter from Maeda Toshinaga dated September 5, 1600)". In 佐藤孝之 (ed.). 古文書の語る地方史 [Regional History Told by Ancient Documents] (in Japanese). 天野出版工房. ISBN 9784642080439. Takayuki Sato (ed.)
- Cultural Assets of Komatsu City (2001). 小松市の文化財 [Asai Battlefield] (in Japanese). 小松市教育委員会.
