= Matsudaira Nobutsuna =

Japanese daimyō (1596–1662)

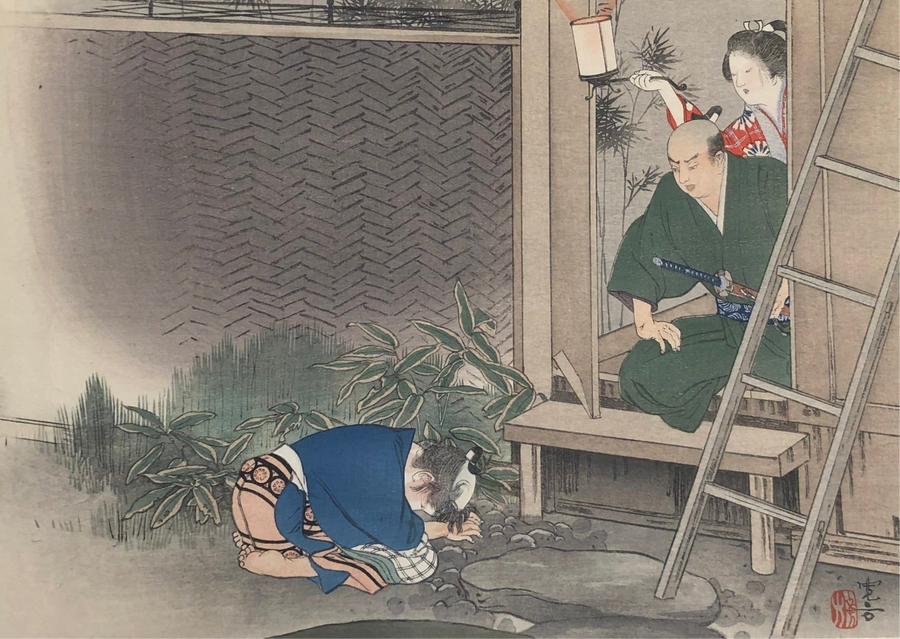
Matsudaira Nobutsuna

Matsudaira Nobutsuna (松平 信綱; December 19, 1596 – May 4, 1662) was a Japanese daimyō of the early Edo period, who ruled the Kawagoe Domain. First serving Tokugawa Iemitsu as a page, Nobutsuna was renowned for his sagacity. He was named a rōjū in 1633. Nobutsuna led the shogunal forces to their final victory over the rebellion at Shimabara. His court title was Izu no Kami, which was the origin of his nickname, "Izu the Wise" (知恵伊豆, Chie Izu).

== Biography ==
Nobutsuna was born in 1596, the son of Ōkōchi Hisatsuna, a senior retainer of Tokugawa Ieyasu. He was adopted as the heir of his uncle, Matsudaira Masatsuna, in 1601. After being introduced to Hidetada and Ieyasu, he was appointed as page to Ieyasu's grandson Iemitsu. He was greatly admired by Iemitsu, and renowned within the Tokugawa administration for his sagacity.

In the early years of his service, he was a hatamoto; he later became a daimyo. In 1623, he received the court title of Izu no Kami. He became daimyo in 1633, receiving the Oshi Domain as his fief.

After the failure of Itakura Shigemasa to subdue the rebellion at Shimabara in 1637–38, Nobutsuna took command of the allied armies laying siege to Hara Castle, bringing the campaign to a successful conclusion.

In his later years, he joined senior Tokugawa officials such as Hoshina Masayuki in supporting the underaged 4th shōgun, Ietsuna.

In 1653-54, Nobutsuna, in his role as councillor, oversaw the construction of the Tamagawa Aqueduct, which relieved water supply issues in Edo when the sankin-kōtai policy requiring lords to set up residences in the capital made the existing water supply system inadequate.

== In popular culture ==
Nobutsuna is portrayed as one of the two main villains in the manga series Shin Kozure Okami (New Lone Wolf and Cub). His physical appearance in the manga is drawn to make him appear extremely ugly, and even Shōgun Ietsuna calls him "as ugly as a toad". He is determined to destroy the Satsuma clan partly because he fears that Satsuma will one day become so powerful that it will rise up against the Shogunate but also so that Satsuma's vast wealth will fall into the Shogunate coffers. To that end, he is willing to use any means no matter how despicable, even faking his own death and deliberately disfiguring himself physically in order to impersonate a powerful Satsuma nobleman.

Preceded by Matsudaira Tadayoshi	Daimyō of Oshi; 1633–1639	Succeeded by Abe Tadaaki
Preceded by Hotta Masamori	Daimyō of Kawagoe; 1639–1662	Succeeded by Matsudaira Terutsuna
