= Niwa Nagashige =

- 丹羽 長重
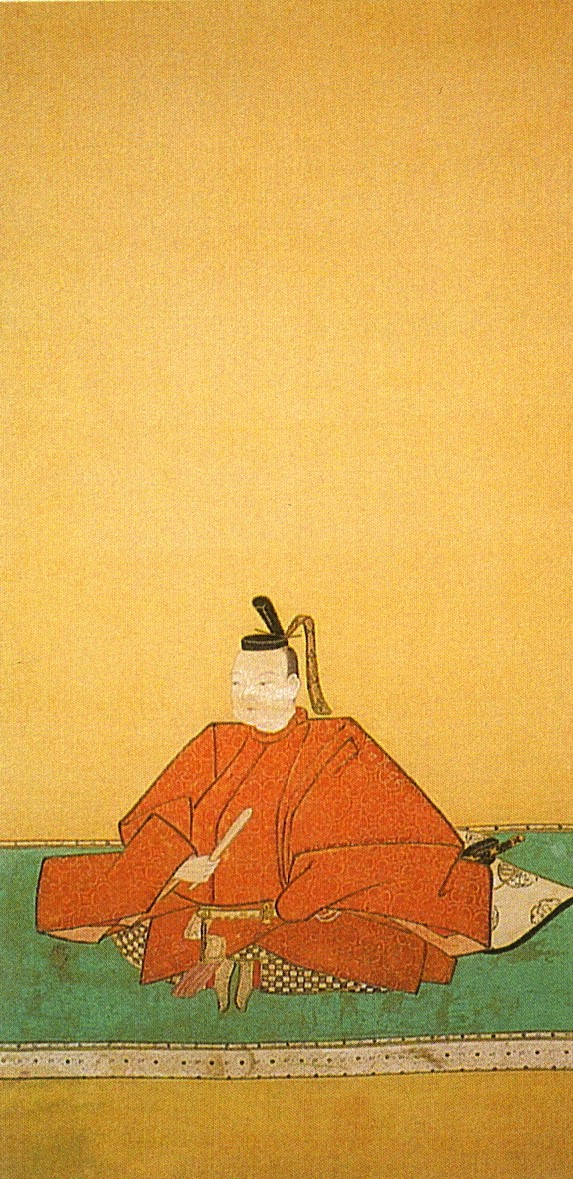

Head of Niwa clan
- In office 1585–1637
- Preceded by: Niwa Nagahide
- Succeeded by: Niwa Mitsushige

Lord of Tanagura
- In office 1622–1637
- Preceded by: Tachibana Muneshige
- Succeeded by: Niwa Mitsushige

Personal details
- Born: May 11, 1571
- Died: April 30, 1637 (aged 65)
- Spouse: Ho-onin
- Children: Niwa Mitsushige
- Parent: Niwa Nagahide
- Occupation: Daimyō

Military service
- Allegiance: Toyotomi clan Western army Tokugawa Shogunate
- Commands: Shirakawa Castle
- Battles/wars: Battle of Komaki and Nagakute (1584); Siege of Odawara (1590); Battle of Asainawate (1600); Siege of Osaka (1614-1615)

Niwa Nagashige (丹羽 長重; May 11, 1571 – April 30, 1637) was a Japanese daimyō who served the Oda clan. Nagashige was the eldest son of Niwa Nagahide and married the 5th daughter of Oda Nobunaga. He took part in his first campaign in 1583, assisting his father in the Battle of Shizugatake against Shibata Katsuie. In 1584, the Battle of Nagakute, at the age of thirteen, Nagashige led a troop of the Niwa clan in place of his father, who was ill.

In 1585, upon Nagahide's death, Nagashige received his father's fief of 1,230,000 koku (spanning Echizen, Wakasa, and parts of Kaga).

During the Siege of Toyama against the forces of Sassa Narimasa, Hideyoshi accused the Niwa clan with collaboration, and seized most of their territories, leaving the clan with only Wakasa Province at 150,000 koku. This is believed to have been Hideyoshi's effort to reduce the Niwa clan's strength.

During the subsequent Kyūshū Campaign in 1589, one of the Niwa clan retainers was again accused of collaboration with the enemy, and the clan was reduced further to a small 40,000 koku holding around Komatsu in Kaga Province. However, Toyotomi Hideyoshi was mercurial in his moods, and in response to Nagashige's efforts at the Siege of Odawara, his status was brought back to 120,000 koku.

In 1600, at the Battle of Sekigahara, Nagashige took part in Ishida Mitsunari's force and fought against Maeda Toshinaga of Kaga at Battle of Asai; he consequently had his holdings briefly confiscated. His daimyo status was restored in 1603, when the Tokugawa family granted him 10,000 koku at Futsuto, in Hitachi Province.

At the siege of Osaka from 1614 to 1615, Nagashige fought on Tokugawa Ieyasu's side. For his service in battle, he had his stipend increased; his fief was transferred to the Edosaki Domain (20,000 koku). Nagashige was promoted again in 1622 with a move to the Tanagura Domain and a stipend increase to 50,000 koku. His rise culminated in 1627, when he was granted the Shirakawa Domain (worth 100,700 koku) and built Shirakawa Castle.

Nagashige's successor was his son, Niwa Mitsushige.
