= Matsudaira Sadanobu =

Daimyō

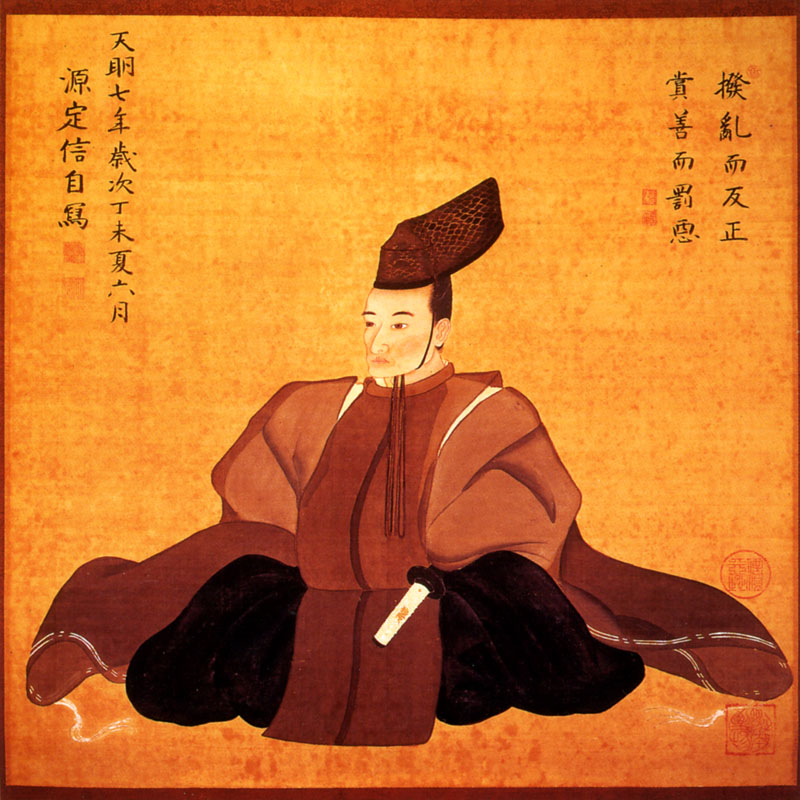
- Self portrait

3rd Lord of Shirakawa
- In office 1783–1812
- Preceded by: Matsudaira Sadakuni
- Succeeded by: Matsudaira Sadanaga

Personal details
- Born: January 15, 1759 Edo, Japan
- Died: June 14, 1829 (aged 70)

Matsudaira Sadanobu (松平 定信; Japanese pronunciation: [ma.tsɯ.daꜜi.ɾa | sa.daꜜ.no.bɯ, maꜜ.tsɯ.dai.ɾa-], January 15, 1759 – June 14, 1829) was a Japanese daimyō of the mid-Edo period, famous for his financial reforms which saved the Shirakawa Domain (modern: Shirakawa, Fukushima), and similar reforms he undertook during his tenure as chief senior councilor (老中首座, rōjū shuza) of the Tokugawa shogunate, from 1787 to 1793.

== Early life ==
Matsudaira Sadanobu was the seventh son of Tokugawa Munetake, of the Tayasu branch of the Tokugawa clan. The Tayasu was one of the gosankyō, the senior-most of the lesser cadet branches of the Shōgun's family, and was thus the grandson of the reform-minded eighth shōgun Tokugawa Yoshimune. The Tayasu house stood apart from the other cadet branches resident in Edo Castle, living a more austere lifestyle, following the example set by Yoshimune—in Munetake's words, the praise of manly spirit (masuraoburi) as opposed to feminine spirit (taoyameburi). It also set itself apart from the other branches due to its history of thwarted political ambition—the founder, Munetake, had hoped to become his father's heir but was passed over for Yoshimune's eldest son, Tokugawa Ieshige. As a result, Sadanobu was brought up from a very young age with the hopes of being placed as the next shogunal heir, despite his poor health as a child. His education was very thorough, being done along Confucian lines, and by his teens Sadanobu had already read and memorized much of the Confucian canon. As he matured, there was a further onus on Sadanobu for success as several members of the Tayasu house began to die young. Further attempts were made by the family to place Sadanobu as the next shogunal heir, but they were thwarted by the political clique of Tanuma Okitsugu, who was then in power as the chief rōjū.

== Early career ==
At the age of 17, he was adopted by Matsudaira Sadakuni, the daimyō of Shirakawa Domain in Mutsu Province, over the objections of the Tayasu clan, which was thus left without an heir. This issue arose the following year, and although Sadanobu petitioned to be reinstated with the Tayasu clan, Shogun Ieshige, at the instigation of Tanuma Okitsugu refused, and the clan remained without a leader for over a decade. In the meantime, Sadanobu succeeded to the head of the 100,000 koku Shirakawa Domain in late 1783 following his adopted father's protracted illness. He was immediately faced with his domain's economically disastrous position: of 110,000 koku that it was supposed to be able to produce, 108,600 had been reported "lost". Sadanobu worked ceaselessly to fix the economic situation in Shirakawa, finally saving it and bringing its finances and agriculture back to stability.

Sadanobu was also faced with issues caused by the Great Tenmei famine from 1782 to 1788. This had been caused by a combination of poor weather, volcanic eruptions and the mercantilist policy implemented by Tanuma Okitsugu intended to commercialize agriculture and thus increase tax income. Despite repeated failure of the rice crop, the government continued to insist on payment of taxes in rice, which led to famine in northern Japan, riots, and the bankruptcy of many of the northern domains. In previous famines, rice which had been stored in Edo had been used to provide famine relief, but under Tanuma, these reserves had already been sold off. Sadanobu prevented famine in Shirakawa by obtaining rice from Echigo Province and from Aizu Domain, which had been little affected by the crop failures, and earned great praise for his famine relief measures.

== As Chief Councilor ==
These reforms, coupled with Sadanobu's continued political maneuvering, brought Sadanobu fame, and on the death of Tokugawa Ieharu, he was named chief councilor of the Shogunate in the summer of 1787, and regent to the 11th shōgun Tokugawa Ienari early the following year. He immediately started to use his position to overturn all of Tanuma Okitsugu's policies, and to revert to a system based on his grandfather's Kyōhō Reforms. Tanuma had attempted to stimulate the economy through mercantilist and capitalist policies, which Sadanobu felt had corrupted the samurai through the use of money and connections. In rural areas, the gap between rich and poor had become widespread, and poor farmers were fleeing the land for the cities, where they could make more money. As more farmland went uncultivated, famine forced more peasants into the cities, further disrupting social order. The Kansei Reforms aimed fiscal consolidation through severe austerity policies and sumptuary laws, rural reconstruction, and preventing the recurrence of popular uprising.

This period of Sadanobu's strengthening of the already faltering Tokugawa regime is known as the Kansei Reforms. His policies could as well be construed as a reactionary response to the excesses of his predecessor under Shōgun Ieharu.

== Failure of the Kansei Reforms ==
In terms of foreign policy, Sadanobu understood that the threat to Japan's national isolation was increasing, especially from Imperial Russia. However, he had the opinion that it was safer for Japan's security to leave the island of Ezo barren, and supported the continued administration of the island by Matsumae Domain. Faced with pressure from other officials in the Shogunate with the opposite opinion and who wanted to divide Ezo between various daimyō to encourage its settlement and development, he compromised by assigning sectors to various domains for defense and encouraged more trade with the Ainu people. He also began steps to bolster Japan's coastal defenses by establishing a gunnery training school in Nagasaki in 1791 and in Edo in 1792. In 1792 he was also faced with a diplomatic crisis, in which the Russian officer Adam Laxman landed in Ezo with a large force of men to return a Japanese castaway Daikokuya Kōdayū and to open trade negotiations. Aware of the changing political situation in Europe, Sadanobu took the politically risky step of allowing Laxman to proceed to Matsumae and was prepared to negotiate with him should he reach Nagasaki, but Laxman departed from Matsumae without achieving his stated objectives. The shogunate responded by ordering Sadanobu to redouble coastal defenses, and he devised a network of coastal artillery sites around Edo Bay, visiting numerous locations in Sagami and Izu to investigate sites firsthand. He also ordered the construction of a western-style warship to be based at Uraga.

However, while Sadanobu was making apparent progress in terms of national defense and foreign affairs, criticism over the harsh and largely unpopular policies of the Kansei Reforms were steadily gaining strength. Sadanobu had also gathered many powerful enemies, including Emperor Kōkaku, who was angered by his opposition to a plan to grant an honorific title to his deceased father, and Shogun Tokugawa Ienari, who once reportedly demanded that a page fetch a sword so that he could cut down Sadanobu for his "insolence". Sadanobu recovered the finances of the Shogunate to some extent, and had some success in rescuing its reputation, his credibility and popularity in the Tokugawa bureaucracy became overtaxed. Although in his autobiography he states that "one should retire before discontent sets in", in fact he was ordered to resign, receiving the notification while on a trip to investigate maritime defenses. Despite his resignation, many of then policies which he put into place were continued by his successors and remained the basis of Tokugawa policy to the end of the shogunate.

== Later years ==
After Sadanobu's forced resignation from the senior council, he continued to keep up with political affairs, especially keeping in close touch with his successor Matsudaira Nobuaki, as well as the rector of the Shogunate's college, Hayashi Jussai, whom he had personally installed in that position. He also turned his attention to the administration of his own domain of Shirakawa. Sadanobu encouraged horse production and reforms of the domain's finances. He also created the Nanko Park near Shirakawa Castle by building a reservoir with a vast garden which, most unusually for the time, he insisted be open to the common people, regardless of social status. Although there were complaints from his retainers in Shirakawa on the strictness of his frugality policy, he was general regarded as a good ruler in Shirakawa. However, the Edo Bay security policies which he had advocated during the time of the Kansei Reforms came into effect in 1810. Shirakawa was called upon to provide a garrison in the Bōsō Peninsula together with Matsudaira Katahiro of Aizu. This put severe pressure on the finances of Shirakawa.

Sadanobu retired from the family headship in 1819, and was succeeded by his son Sadanaga, but continued to influence domain affairs from behind-the-scenes. He successfully petitioned for a change in territory from Shirakawa to Kuwana Domain in Ise Province. Officially, he desired to take over the former territory of the Hisamatsu-Matsudaira family because it had a seaport; however, it was clear that Shirakawa would be unable to withstand the financial deterioration caused by the Edo Bay security measures, and he wished to pass this responsibility on to Hotta Masaatsu of Sakura Domain, whom he disliked.

Sadanobu came down with a cold in early 1829, which soon deteriorated into a high fever lasting for weeks. During his illness, a fire in Edo destroyed his primary and secondary residences, forcing him to evacuate each time. Due to his illness, he had to be transported lying down in a large palanquin, which blocked the traffic of townspeople attempting to flee the fire. He quickly became the subject of a vicious slander campaign in which handbills of unknown provenance were distributed throughout Edo accusing him of ordering the slaughter of townsmen during the fire and of his fleeing the burning city in his loincloth to hide in Fukui Domain. Sadanobu initially sheltered at the kamiyashiki of the Iyo-Matsuyama Domain, but due to lack of room, relocated to the nakayashiki of Matsuyama Domain in Mita. He started to show signs of recovery from his illness, enough to hold a poetry reading with his retainers and to discuss politics with his son Sadanaga on the afternoon of June 14, but died that same evening. His grave is located at the temple of Reigan-ji in Kōtō, Tokyo, and was designated a National Historic Site in 1928.

According to his will, his son petitioned the Yoshida family in Kyoto to grant him the deified title of Shukoku-daimyōjin. This was granted in three stages, in 1833, 1834, and 1855. Sadanobu was enshrined together with the Hisamatsu founder Sadatsuna, Sugawara no Michizane, and two other figures, in the Chinkoku-Shukoku shrine. This shrine has branches both in Kuwana, where Sadanaga was transferred, and in Sadanobu's former fief of Shirakawa, where the shrine was built in 1918.

One of Sadanaga's sons, Itakura Katsukiyo, became almost as famous as his grandfather in the late Edo era, due to his attempted reforms of the Shogunate.

== As a writer ==
Aside from his political reforms, Sadanobu was also known as a writer and a moralist, working under the pen name Rakuō (楽翁). Some of his notable texts include Uge no Hitokoto, Tōzen Manpitsu, Kanko-dōri, Kagetsutei Nikki, Seigo, and Ōmu no Kotoba, among others. Some time after his death, it was discovered that he had written a satirical text parodying daimyō life, titled Daimyō Katagi. Scholars have since been somewhat taken aback by this discovery, since the text falls into the category of gesaku, which Sadanobu officially opposed.

== Bibliography ==
- Backus, Robert L. The Kansei Prohibition of Heterodoxy and Its Effects on Education. In Harvard Journal of Asiatic Studies, Vol. 39, No. 1. (June 1979), pp. 55–106.
- Backus, Robert L. The Motivation of Confucian Orthodoxy in Tokugawa Japan. In Harvard Journal of Asiatic Studies, Vol. 39, No. 2. (December 1979), pp. 275–338.
- Hall, John Wesley. (1955). Tanuma Okitsugu: Forerunner of Modern Japan. Cambridge: Harvard University Press.
- Iwasaki Haruko. "Portrait of a Daimyo: Comical Fiction by Matsudaira Sadanobu" in Monumenta Nipponica, Vol. 38, No. 1. (Spring, 1983), pp. 1–19.
- Matsudaira Sadanobu. "Daimyo Katagi" (English translation) in Monumenta Nipponica, Vol. 38, No. 1. (Spring, 1983), pp. 20–48.
- Ooms, Herman. (1975). Charismatic Bureaucrat: A political biography of Matsudaira Sadanobu, 1758–1829. Chicago: University of Chicago Press. ISBN 0-226-63031-5
- Screech, Timon. (2000) "The Shogun's Painted Culture: Fear and Creativity in the Japanese States". London: Reaktion Books
- Soranaka Isao. "The Kansei Reforms-Success or Failure?" in Monumenta Nipponica, Vol. 33, No. 2. (Summer, 1978), pp. 151–164.
- Totman, Conrad. (1967). Politics in the Tokugawa Bakufu, 1600–1843. Cambridge: Harvard University Press. ISBN 0-674-68800-7 [reprinted by University of California Press, Berkeley, 1988. ISBN 0-520-06313-9]

Preceded by Matsudaira Sadakuni	3rd daimyō of Shirakawa (Hisamatsu-Matsudaira); 1783–1812	Succeeded by Matsudaira Sadanaga
