= Abe Masanori =

Japanese daimyō (1806–1823)

Abe Masanori 阿部正権
- Born: February 26, 1806
- Died: November 8, 1823 (aged 17)
- Occupations: Daimyō of Oshi Domain (1808–1823); Daimyō of Shirakawa Domain (1823–1823)
- Father: Abe Masayoshi

Abe Masanori (阿部正権; February 26, 1806 – November 8, 1823) was the ninth Abe daimyō of Oshi Domain in Musashi Province (modern-day Saitama Prefecture) and the first Abe daimyō of Shirakawa Domain in southern Mutsu Province (modern Fukushima Prefecture).

Masanori was born as the second son of Abe Masayoshi, daimyō of Oshi Domain. His childhood name was Kanemaru (銕 丸). When he was three years old, his father died and Masanori became heir and chieftain of his branch of the Abe clan. However, since Masanori was under age and also of feeble constitution, his mother took over the administration of the domain and Masanori was placed under the guardianship of Abe Masakiyo, daimyō of Fukuyama Domain in Bingo Province.

In 1822, the Tokugawa shogunate issued a decree rotating the daimyō of Oshi, Kuwana and Shirakawa Domains. The Abe clan, which had been administering Oshi for 114 years, was forced to relocate to Shirakawa. In the midst of this move, Masanori died. Since he died, without having ever been formally received in audience by the Shōgun, he was never awarded a formal court rank or courtesy title. The succession passed to his cousin Abe Masaatsu.

Preceded by Abe Masayoshi	9th Abe Daimyō of Oshi; 1803–1823	Succeeded by none
Preceded by Matsudaira Sadanaga	1st Abe Daimyō of Shirakawa; 1823–1823	Succeeded by Abe Masaatsu
