= Kanagawa bugyō =

Kanagawa bugyō (神奈川奉行) were officials of the Tokugawa shogunate in Edo period Japan. This office was created on July 3, 1859, when five fudai daimyō were appointed. Conventional interpretations have construed these Japanese titles as "commissioner" or "overseer" or "governor."

This bakufu title identifies an official responsible for administration of the port of Kanagawa (modern Yokohama. The number of men holding the title concurrently has varied over time, from as few as five in 1859 to as many as nine at one time.

This office was often held concurrently with the office of gaikoku-bugyō.

== List of Kanagawa bugyō ==
- Mizuno Tadanori, (1859).
- Takemoto Masao (1859–1860, 1861–1862).
- Matsudaira Yasunao (1860–1863).
- Abe Masato (1864–1866).
- Hayakawa Hisatake

== See also ==
- Bugyō
