= Matsudaira Yasuhide =

Japanese daimyō

Daimyō of Kawagoe
- In office 1866–1869
- Preceded by: Matsudaira Naokatsu
- Succeeded by: Matsudaira Yasutoshi

Personal details
- Born: July 16, 1830 Edo, Japan
- Died: July 5, 1904 (aged 73) Tokyo, Japan
- Spouse(s): Matsudaira Kagi, later Nabeshima Naoko

Matsudaira Yasuhide (松平 康英) (July 16, 1830 – July 5, 1904) was a Japanese daimyō of the late Edo period, who ruled the Tanakura and then Kawagoe Domains. He served as gaikoku bugyō and rōjū in the Tokugawa administration.

== Biography ==
Matsudaira Yasuhide was born in Edo to the high-ranking hatamoto Matsudaira Yasuzumi; his childhood name was Mantarō. He succeeded Yasuzumi upon the latter's retirement early in 1848, taking the name of Yasunao. Yasunao served in a variety of minor posts in the Tokugawa shogunate, before being appointed to the concurrent posts of gaikoku bugyō and Kanagawa bugyō in early 1860.

From 1860 to 1861, he was involved in boundary negotiations with Russia, and was a member of the Tokugawa shogunate's embassy to Europe.

Yasunao was adopted as the successor to Matsudaira Yasuhiro, lord of the Tanakura Domain, in late 1864. Shortly after his succession, he received the title of Suō no Kami and changed his name to Yasuhide.

Yasuhide was slated for transfer to the Utsunomiya Domain in the spring of 1865; however, this was canceled. Soon afterward he was appointed to the position of rōjū.

In 1866, he was again slated for transfer, this time to the Shirakawa Domain; however, because of the current ruling family's financial situation, this move was also canceled; Yasuhide was instead moved to the Kawagoe Domain. In Kawagoe, he is remembered for having opened the domain's school, the Chōzenkan (長善館). Yasuhide was relieved of his duties as rōjū during the disintegration of the Tokugawa government in early 1868. After the start of the Boshin War, he was briefly ordered into solitary confinement by the Meiji Government for a month in the spring of 1868; the next year, he retired in favor of his adopted heir, Yasutoshi.

Preceded by Matsudaira Yasuhiro	Daimyō of Tanakura; 1864–1866	Succeeded by Abe Masakiyo
Preceded by Matsudaira Naokatsu	Daimyō of Kawagoe; 1866–1869	Succeeded by Matsudaira Yasutoshi

== Published work ==
- Matsudaira Yasuhide 松平康英 and Onoma Ritsuken 尾間立顕 (1919). Bakumatsu ken'ō shisetsu danpan shiki 幕末遣欧使節談判私記 (A Private Record of Discussions Pertaining to the Diplomatic Mission to Europe in the Bakumatsu Period). Tokyo: Min'yūsha 民友社, 1919. (published posthumously)
