= Tanagura Domain =

Tanagura Domain 棚倉藩
- under Tokugawa shogunate Japan
- 1603–1871
- Capital: Tanagura Castle
- Area
  - Coordinates: 37°1′46.89″N 140°23′8.29″E
  - Type: Daimyō
- Historical era: Edo period
  - Established: 1603
  - Disestablished: 1871
- Today part of: part of Fukushima Prefecture

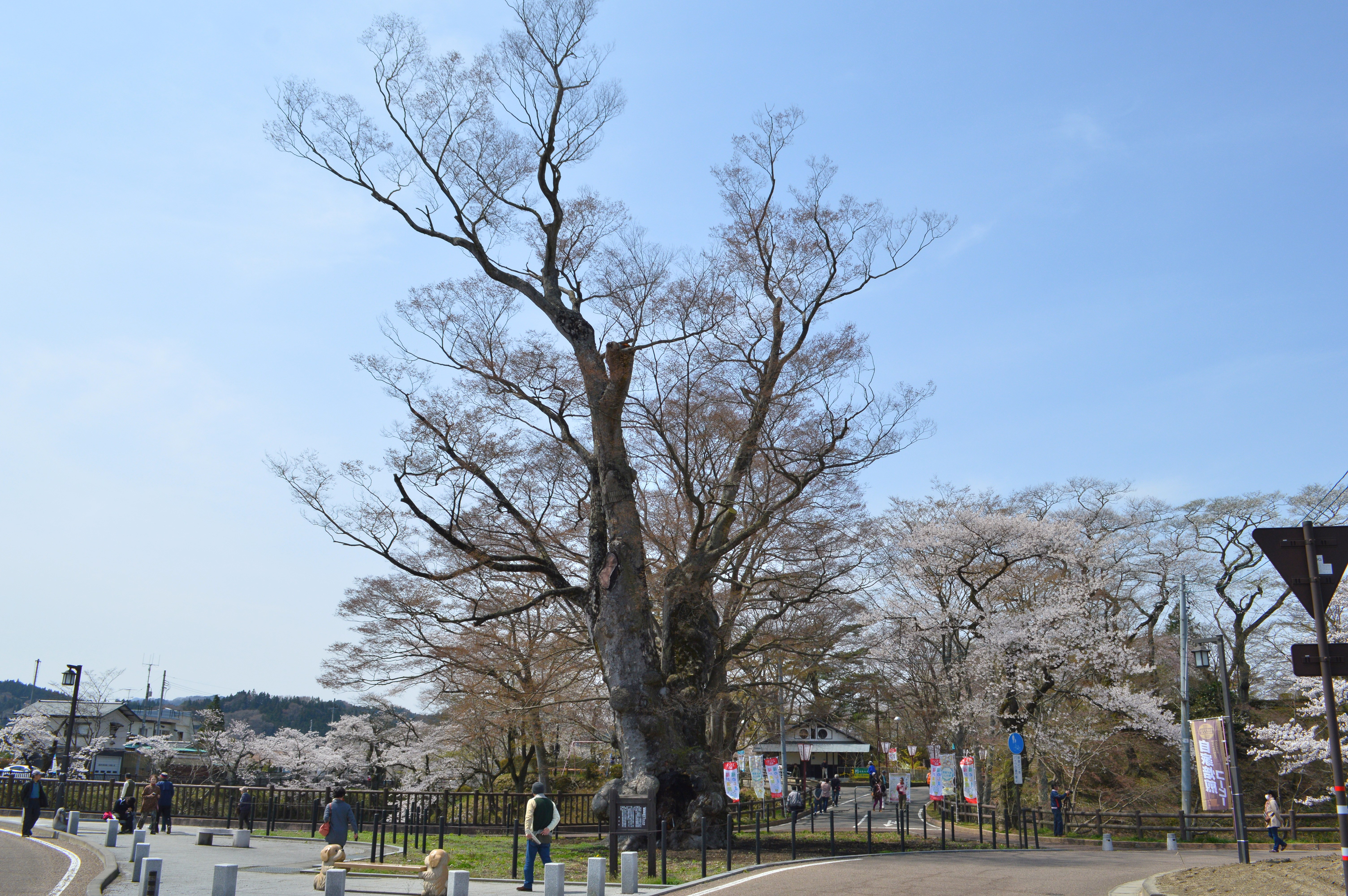
Site of Tanagura Castle, administrative HQ of Tanagura Domain

Tanagura Domain (棚倉藩, Tanagura-han) was a fudai feudal domain under the Tokugawa shogunate of Edo period Japan. It is located in southern Mutsu Province, Honshū. The domain was centered at Tanagura Castle, located in what is now part of the town of Tanagura in Fukushima Prefecture.

== History ==
During the Sengoku period, Tanagura was an outpost of the Satake clan, who built the mountain-top Akadake Castle near what would later become Tanagura Castle. After the Satake were defeated and transferred to Dewa Province by Tokugawa Ieyasu, the area was awarded to Tachibana Muneshige. Following the Siege of Osaka, the domain was awarded to Niwa Nagashige, who was ordered to build a completely new castle by Shōgun Tokugawa Hidetada. The Niwa were followed by the Naitō clan, who continued to develop the castle and its surrounding castle town; however, under the Tokugawa shogunate the domain saw frequent changes of daimyō.

During the Bakumatsu period, Matsudaira Yasuhide was transferred to Kawagoe Domain, and Abe Masakiyo was transferred from neighbouring Shirakawa Domain. During the Boshin War, the domain was a member of the pro-Tokugawa Ōuetsu Reppan Dōmei, but fell to imperial forces in 1868 after only one day of fighting. In July 1871, with the abolition of the han system, Tanagura Domain briefly became Tanagura Prefecture, and was merged into the newly created Fukushima Prefecture. Under the new Meiji government, Abe Masakoto, the final daimyō of Tanagura Domain was given the kazoku peerage title of shishaku (viscount).

== Bakumatsu period holdings ==
As with most domains in the han system, Tanagura Domain consisted of several discontinuous territories calculated to provide the assigned kokudaka, based on periodic cadastral surveys and projected agricultural yields.

- Mutsu Province (Iwaki Province)
  - 62 villages in Shirakawa District
  - 26 villages in Kikuta District
  - 15 villages in Naraha District
  - 3 villages in Iwasaki District
  - 1 village in Iwaki District
- Mutsu Province (Iwashiro Province)
  - 26 villages in Date District
  - 2 villages in Shinobu District
- Dewa Province (Uzen Province)
  - 12 villages in Murayama District
- Harima Province
  - 18 villages in Katō District

== List of daimyōs ==
#	Name	Tenure	Courtesy title	Court Rank	kokudaka	Notes
Tachibana clan (tozama) 1603–1620
1	Tachibana Muneshige (立花宗茂)	1603–1620	Sakon-no-jo (左近将監); Jijū (侍従)	Lower 4th (従四位下)	10,000→25,500→35,000 koku	transfer to Yanagawa Domain
Niwa clan (tozama) 1622–1627
1	Niwa Nagashige (丹羽長重)	1622–1627	Kaga-no-kami (加賀守); Jijū (侍従)	3rd (従三位下)	50,000 koku	transfer to Shirakawa Domain
Naitō clan (fudai) 1627–1705
1	Naitō Nobuteru (内藤信照)	1627–1665	Buzen-no-kami (豊前守)	Lower 5th (従五位下)	70,000 koku	
2	Naitō Nobuyoshi (内藤信良)	1665–1674	Buzen-no-kami (豊前守)	Lower 5th (従五位下)	70,000 koku	
3	Naitō Kazunobu (内藤弌信)	1673–1705	Buzen-no-kami (豊前守)	Lower 4th (従四位下)	70,000 koku	transfer to Tanaka Domain
Ōta clan (fudai) 1705–1728
1	Ōta Sukeharu (太田資晴)	1705–1728	Bitchu-no-kami (備中守)	Lower 4th (従四位下)	50,000 koku	transfer to Tatebayashi Domain
Matsudaira clan (shinpan) 1728–1746
1	Matsudaira Takechika (松平武元)	1728–1746	Ukon-no-jo (右近将監); Jijū (侍従)	Lower 4th (従四位下)	65,000 koku	
Ogasawara clan (fudai) 1746–1817
1	Ogasawara Nagayuki (小笠原長恭)	1746–1776	Sado-no-kami (佐渡守)	Lower 5th (従五位下)	65,000 koku	
2	Ogasawara Nagataka (小笠原長堯)	1776–1812	Sado-no-kami (佐渡守)	Lower 5th (従五位下)	65,000 koku	
3	Ogasawara Nagamasa (小笠原長昌)	1812–1817	Sado-no-kami (佐渡守)	Lower 5th (従五位下)	65,000 koku	transfer to Karasu Domain
Inoue clan (fudai) 1817–1836
1	Inoue Masamoto (井上正甫)	1817–1820	Kawachi-no-kami (河内守)	Lower 5th (従五位下)	60,000 koku	
2	Inoue Masaharu (井上正春)	1820–1836	Kawachi-no-kami (河内守); Jijū (侍従)	Lower 4th (従四位下)	60,000 koku	transfer to Tatebayashi Domain
Matsudaira clan (fudai) 1836–1866
1	Matsudaira Yasutaka (松平康爵)	1836–1854	Sakon-no-jo (右近将監)	Lower 5th (従五位下)	60,000 koku	
2	Matsudaira Yasukado (松平康圭)	1854–1862	Suwo-no-kami (周防守)	Lower 5th (従五位下)	60,000 koku	
3	Matsudaira Yasuhiro (松平康泰)	1862–1864	Suwo-no-kami (周防守)	Lower 5th (従五位下)	60,000 koku	
4	Matsudaira Yasuhide (松平康英)	1864–1866	Suwo-no-kami (周防守)	Lower 5th (従五位下)	60,000 koku	transfer to Kawagoe Domain
Abe clan (fudai) 1868–1871
1	Abe Masakiyo (阿部正静)	1866–1868	Mimasaka-no-kami (美作守)	Lower 5th (従五位下)	100,000 -> 60,000 koku	
2	Abe Masakoto (阿部正功)	1868–1871	none -	-none -	60,000 koku	

== See also ==
- List of Han
