= Abe Masayoshi =

Japanese daimyō

Abe Masayoshi (阿部 正由; December 19, 1769 – November 28, 1808)

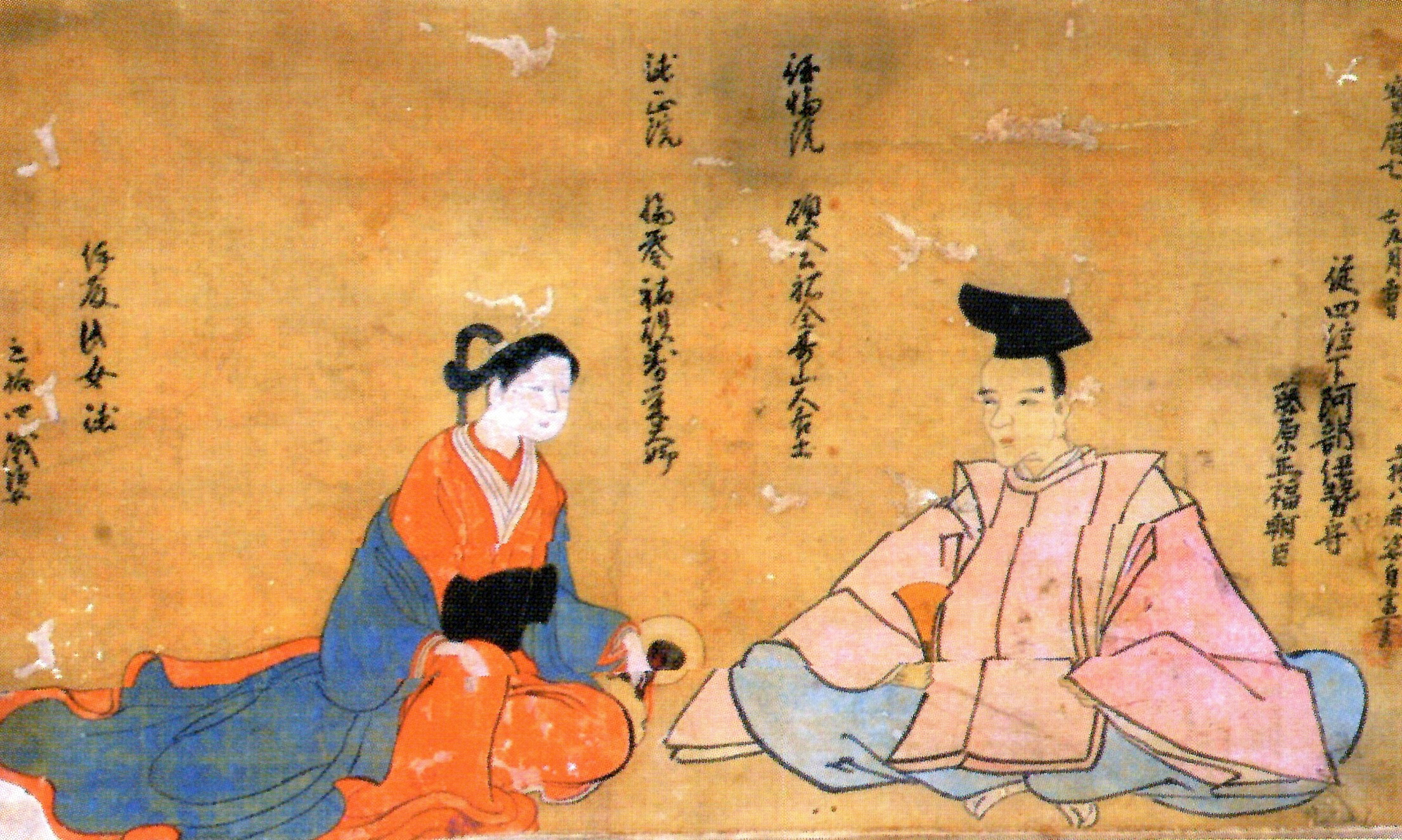
Abe Masayoshi and his wife

was a Japanese daimyō of the mid-Edo period, who ruled the Oshi Domain.

Masayoshi served as Kyoto Shoshidai.

Preceded by Abe Masatsune	Daimyō of Oshi; 1796–1808	Succeeded by Abe Masanori
Preceded by Inaba Masatatsu	35th Kyoto Shoshidai; 1806–1808	Succeeded by Sakai Tadayuki
