= Niwa (surname) =

Niwa is a Japanese surname. Notable people with the surname include:

- Niwa clan, retainer clan of the Oda clan during the Sengoku period of Japan (1603 – 1868)
  - Niwa Nagaaki, Daimyō of Nihonmatsu, 1796 – 1813
  - Niwa Nagahide, Daimyō of Shirakawa
  - Niwa Nagahiro, Daimyō of Nihonmatsu, 1868 – 1871
  - Niwa Nagakuni, Daimyō of Nihonmatsu, 1858 – 1868
  - Niwa Nagashige, Daimyō of Shirakawa, 1628 – 1638
  - Niwa Nagatomi, Daimyō of Nihonmatsu, 1813 – 1858
- Akemi Niwa (丹羽 明美, born 1973), Japanese curler, 1998 Winter Olympics participant
- Daiki Niwa (footballer), Japanese footballer
- Hideki Niwa, Japanese politician
- Koki Niwa, Japanese table tennis player
- Mikiho Niwa, Japanese actress
- Niwa Mitsushige (丹羽 光重, 1622–1701), Japanese samurai and daimyō
- Ryuhei Niwa, Japanese footballer
- Shion Niwa (丹羽 詩温, born 1994), Japanese footballer
- Uichiro Niwa, Japanese diplomat and businessman
- Yasujiro Niwa, Japanese scientist
- Yuya Niwa, Japanese politician
