= Nita =

NITA may refer to:

== Places ==
- Nita District, Shimane, Japan
  - Nita, Shimane, a former town merged with Yokota in 2005 to form Okuizumo

== People ==
- Nita (given name)
- Niță, a Romanian surname

== NITA ==
- National Information Technology Agency, a public service institution of the Republic of Gabon
- National Institute of Technology Agartala, a technology-oriented institute of higher education in Agartala, India
- National Institute for Trial Advocacy, a nonprofit organization with headquarters in Louisville, Colorado
- Northern Illinois Transit Authority, a public transit agency in the Chicago area

== Other uses ==
- Nita (spider), a genus in the spider family Pholcidae
- USS Nita (1856), a captured Confederate steamer used by the Union Navy during the American Civil War
- "N.I.T.A.", a song by Young Marble Giants from their album Colossal Youth
- Nita, a character from the video game Brawl Stars

== See also ==
- Neetu, an Indian feminine given name
