= Niwa =

Niwa or NIWA may refer to:

== Places ==
- Niwa Station, Beijing Subway
- Niwa District, Aichi, a district in Japan

=== In Poland ===
- Niwa, Lower Silesian Voivodeship (south-west Poland)
- Niwa, Łódź Voivodeship (central Poland)
- Niwa, Puławy County in Lublin Voivodeship (east Poland)
- Niwa, Zamość County in Lublin Voivodeship (east Poland)
- Niwa, Lubaczów County in Subcarpathian Voivodeship (south-east Poland)
- Niwa, Tarnobrzeg County in Subcarpathian Voivodeship (south-east Poland)
- Niwa, Masovian Voivodeship (east-central Poland)
- Niwa, Opole Voivodeship (south-west Poland)

== Other uses ==
- Niwa (surname)
- Niwa clan, a Japanese samurai clan
- Daisuke Niwa, Emiko Niwa, Kosuke Niwa and Daiki Niwa, phantom thieves in manga series D.N.Angel
- National Institute of Water and Atmospheric Research of New Zealand
- Nintendo Independent Wiki Alliance, an alliance of Nintendo Wikis

== See also ==
- Nina (name)
- Niña (name)
