= Katsutomo =

- Gender: Male

Origin
- Origin: Japanese
- Meaning: Different meanings depending on the kanji used

Katsutomo (written: 勝知, 勝智 or 克友) is a masculine Japanese given name. Notable people with the name include:

- Katsutomo Kaneishi (金石 勝智; born 1968), Japanese racing driver
- Mizuno Katsutomo (水野 勝知; 1838–1919), Japanese daimyō
- Katsutomo Oshiba (大柴 克友; born 1973), Japanese footballer
