= Niwa Nagatomi =

- 丹羽長国
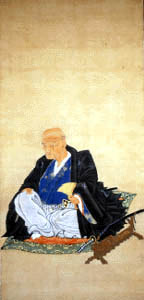
- Niwa Nagatomi, portrait at temple of Dairin-ji, Nihonmatsu, Fukushima (CICP)

9th Daimyō of Nihonmatsu Domain
- In office 1813–1858
- Monarchs: Shōgun: Tokugawa Ienari; Tokugawa Ieyoshi; Tokugawa Iesada
- Preceded by: Niwa Nagaakira
- Succeeded by: Niwa Nagakuni

Personal details
- Born: October 12, 1803 Edo, Japan
- Died: August 12, 1866 (aged 62)
- Spouse(s): Masu, daughter of Arima Yorinao of Kurume Domain
- Parent: Niwa Nagaakira (father)

Niwa Nagatomi (丹羽長富; October 12, 1803 – August 12, 1866) was an Edo period Japanese samurai, and the 9th daimyō of Nihonmatsu Domain in the Tōhoku region of Japan. He was the 10th hereditary chieftain of the Niwa clan. His courtesy title was Saikyō-no-daifu, and his Court rank was Junior Fourth Rank, Lower Grade.

== Biography ==
Nagatomi, known in his childhood as Kakuzō (覚蔵) and later Bankichi (蕃吉), was born in the clan's Edo residence in 1803. He was the eldest son of the previous daimyō, Niwa Nagaakira by a concubine. At age 11, on the death of his father, he became daimyō of Nihonmatsu. Due to his youth, he relied heavily on his karō, Niwa Takaaki. He encouraged his retainers to excel in both martial and literary arts, and to that end, sponsored the opening of the han school, Keigakukan (敬学館). In 1822, he was forced to deploy domain forces to put down a peasant uprising. He also helped revive the domain's economic situation following a seven-year string of famines during the Tenpō era. His domain, together with Aizu Domain, was placed in charge of security at the Futtsu artillery emplacement by the Tokugawa shogunate during the Perry Expedition. Citing ill health, Nagatomi resigned his positions in 1858, and was succeeded by his sixth son Niwa Nagakuni.

Nagatomi was married to a granddaughter of Arima Yoritaka of Kurume Domain. His seventh son was adopted into the Inaba clan, becoming Inaba Masakuni, daimyō of Yodo Domain and a member of the rōjū council. His either son was likewise adopted into the Mizuno clan, becoming Mizuno Katsutomo daimyō of Yūki Domain, while one of his daughters became the official wife of Tokugawa Yoshikatsu of Owari Domain, and another married Tokugawa Mochinaga, head of the Hitotsubashi Tokugawa
