= Țicleni oil field =

Oil field in Gorj County, Romania

Țicleni
- Country: Romania
- Region: Gorj County
- Offshore/onshore: onshore
- Operator: Petrom

Field history
- Discovery: 1940
- Start of development: 1940
- Start of production: 1940

Production
- Current production of oil: 4,500 barrels per day (~2.2×10^{5} t/a)
- Estimated oil in place: 4.39 million tonnes (~ 5×10^{6} m^{3} or 30 million bbl)

The Țicleni oil field is an oil field located in Țicleni, Gorj County. It was discovered in 1940 and developed by Petrom. It began production in 1940 and produces oil. The total proven reserves of the Țicleni oil field are around 30 million barrels (4.39 million tonnes), and production is centered on 4,500 barrels per day (720 m^{3}/d). The oil field is expected to produce around 9,000 barrels per day (1,400 m^{3}/d) by 2015.
