= Niwa Nagaakira =

Japanese samurai (1780–1813)

- 丹羽長祥
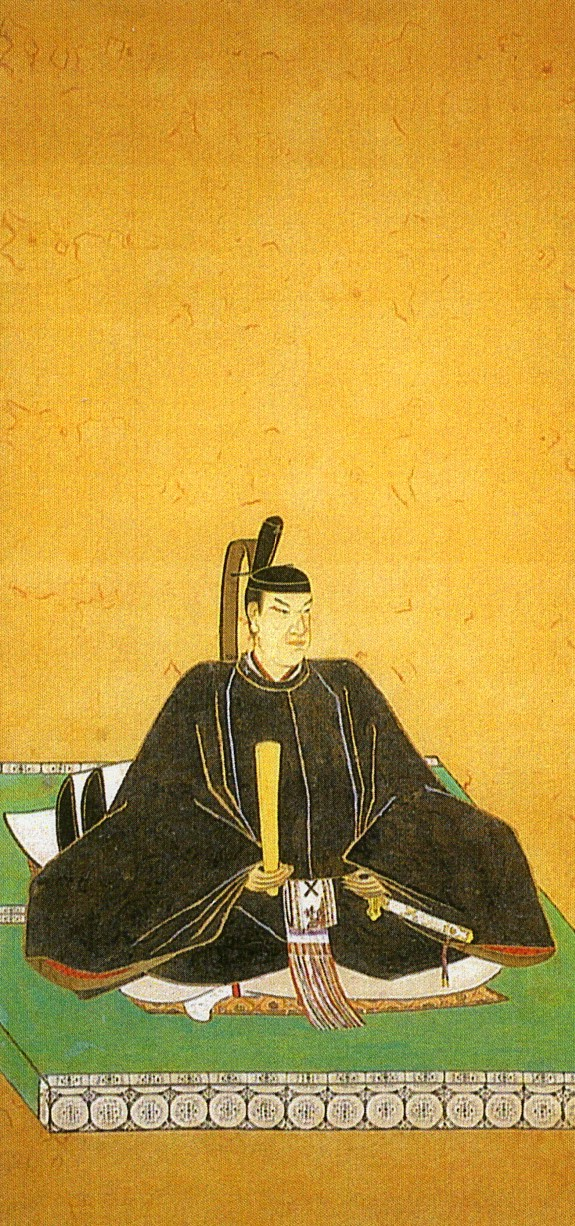
- Niwa Nagaakira, portrait at temple of Dairin-ji, Nihonmatsu, Fukushima (CICP)

8th Daimyō of Nihonmatsu Domain
- In office 1796–1813
- Monarch: Shōgun: Tokugawa Ienari
- Preceded by: Niwa Nagayoshi
- Succeeded by: Niwa Nagatomi

Personal details
- Born: November 18, 1780
- Died: September 19, 1813 (aged 32)
- Spouse: daughter of Arima Yoritaka of Kurume Domain
- Parent: Niwa Nagayoshi (father)

Niwa Nagaakira (丹羽長祥; November 18, 1780 – September 19, 1813) was an Edo period Japanese samurai, and the 8th daimyō of Nihonmatsu Domain in the Tōhoku region of Japan. He was the 11th hereditary chieftain of the Niwa clan. His courtesy title was Saikyō-no-daifu, and his Court rank was Junior Fourth Rank, Lower Grade.

== Biography ==
Nagaakira, first known by his childhood name of Nabetarō (鍋太郎), was the eldest son of Niwa Nagayoshi by a concubine. On June 17, 1796, he became daimyō upon death of his father. His fundamental approach from the time of his succession onwards was that of restructuring the domain's finances. Relying on his reformist karō Narita Yoriyasu (成田頼綏), he encouraged agriculture, promoted education, and assisted in the development of special crafts amongst the commoners. It was at this point that Nihonmatsu's famed Banko-yaki (二本松万古焼) glazed pottery, Kawasaki paper (川崎の紙), Hiraishi tatami (平石の畳), and Ōhira kushikaki (大平串柿; skewered persimmons) were originated. Nagaaki also encouraged sericulture and established horse and silk markets in Nihonmatsu.

Despite these reforms, the domain's finances were hard pressed due to natural disasters and other unforeseen events, as well as the shogunate's request for monetary and construction assistance on flood control projects.

Nagaakira died in 1813, and was succeeded by his eldest son Niwa Nagatomi.
