= Niña (name) =

Niña (Spanish for girl) is a given name, nickname and surname of Spanish origin. Notable people with this name include the following:

- Niña Corpuz (born 1977), Filipino broadcast journalist
- Niña Dolino (born 1982), Filipino actress
- Niña Jose, nickname of Mary Claire José (born 1988), Filipino actress.
- Niña Pastori, stage name of María Rosa García García (born 1978) Spanish singer
- Niña van Dijk (born 1985), member of Treble (musical group)

== See also ==
- Niña (disambiguation)
- Nia (given name)
- Nika (given name)
- Nima (name)
- Nina (name)
- Niño (name)
- Nipa (disambiguation)
- Nita (given name)
- Niwa (disambiguation)
