= Nypa =

Nypa or NYPA may refer to:

- Nypa (plant), a genus of palms
- New York Power Authority

== See also ==
- Nipa (disambiguation)
