= Yūki Domain =

Japanese feudal subdivision

Yūki Domain 結城藩
- under Tokugawa shogunate Japan
- 1590–1871
- Capital: Yūki Castle
  - Type: Daimyō
- Historical era: Edo period
  - Established: 1590
  - Disestablished: 1871
- Today part of: part of Ibaraki Prefecture

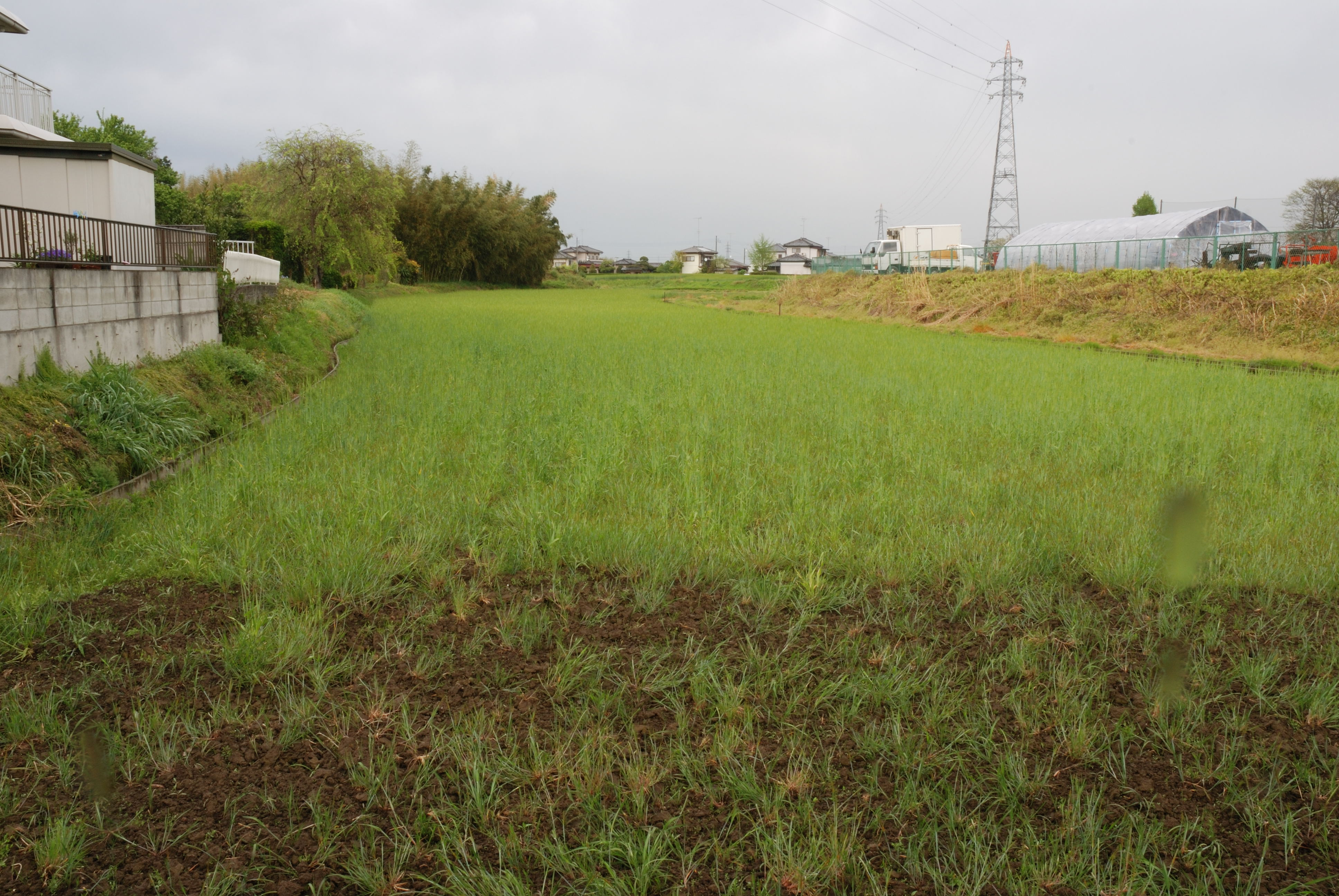
Site of one of the moats of Yūki Castle, administrative center of Yūki Domain

Yūki Domain (結城藩, Yūki-han) was a feudal domain under the Tokugawa shogunate of Edo period Japan, located in Shimōsa Province. It was centered at Yūki castle in what is now part of the city of Yūki, Ibaraki. It was ruled for most of its history by a branch of the Mizuno clan.

== History ==
The Yūki clan was one of the eight leading samurai clans of the Kantō region from the Kamakura period. A younger son of Tokugawa Ieyasu, Hideyasu has been adopted by Toyotomi Hideyoshi as a possible heir, and after the birth of Hideyoshi's son, was sent to become heir to the Yūki clan instead, adopting the name of Yūki Hideyasu. Following the Battle of Sekigahara, he was confirmed as daimyō of Yuki Domain in 1590, ruling until his transfer to Fukui Domain in 1601. The domain reverted to tenryō status, and remained vacant until the Genroku period.

In 1700, Mizuno Katsunaga, daimyo of Nishiya Domain in Noto Province was transferred to the revived Yūki Domain, where his descendants resided until the Meiji Restoration. During the Boshin War, the domain was divided between supporters of the imperial cause, and supporters of the shogunate. The 10th daimyō, Mizuno Katsumoto had been adopted into the clan from Nihonmatsu Domain and was a strong supporter of the Tokugawa, whereas his adopted son and heir, Mizuno Katsuhiro supported the imperial side. Katsumoto assisted Tokugawa partisans capture Yūki castle, but his son assisted in its re-capture by pro-imperial troops. Katsuhiro was punished by the Meiji government with a reduction in revenues of 1000 koku and exile from the domain. Katsuhiro eventually became domain governor and presided over the absorption of the former domain into Ibaraki Prefecture in 1871 after the abolition of the han system.

== Holdings at the end of the Edo period ==
As with most domains in the han system, Yūki Domain consisted of several discontinuous territories calculated to provide the assigned kokudaka, based on periodic cadastral surveys and projected agricultural yields.

- Shimōsa Province
  - 13 villages in Yūki District
- Kazusa Province
  - 2 villages in Yamabe District
  - 16 villages in Musha District
- Hitachi Province
  - 1 village in Ibaraki District
  - 12 villages in Makabe District
- Shimotsuke Province
  - 3 villages in Suga District
  - 10 villages in Haka District

== List of daimyōs ==
#	Name	Tenure	Courtesy title	Court Rank	kokudaka
Yūki clan (Shinpan) 1590–1601
1	Yūki Hideyasu (結城秀康)	1594–1600	Mikawa-no-kami (三河守)	Lower 4th (従四位下)	100,000 koku
Mizuno clan (fudai) 1700-1871
1	Mizuno Katsunaga (水野勝長)	1700–1703	Oki-no-kami (隠岐守)	Lower 5th (従五位下)	18, 000 koku
2	Mizuno Katsumasa (水野勝政)	1703–1736	Hyūga-no-kami (日向守)	Lower 5th (従五位下)	18,000 koku
3	Mizuno Katsunobu (水野勝庸)	1736–1749	Hyūga-no-kami (日向守)	Lower 5th (従五位下)	18,000 koku
4	Mizuno Katsuchika (水野勝前)	1749–1763	Hyūga-no-kami (日向守)	Lower 5th (従五位下)	18,000 koku
5	Mizuno Katsuoki (水野勝起)	1763–1783	Hyūga-no-kami (日向守)	Lower 5th (従五位下)	18,000 koku
6	Mizuno Katsukata (水野勝剛)	1783–1800	Hyūga-no-kami (日向守)	Lower 5th (従五位下)	18,000 koku
7	Mizuno Katsuzune (水野勝愛)	1800–1835	Hyūga-no-kami (日向守)	Lower 5th (従五位下)	18,000 koku
8	Mizuno Katsuyuki (水野勝進)	1835–1859	Hyūga-no-kami (日向守)	Lower 5th (従五位下)	18,000 koku
9	Mizuno Katsuto (水野勝任)	1859–1862	Hyūga-no-kami (日向守)	Lower 5th (従五位下)	18,000 koku
10	Mizuno Katsutomo (水野勝知)	1862–1869	Hyūga-no-kami (日向守)	Lower 5th (従五位下)	18,000 → 17,000 koku
11	Mizuno Katsuhiro (水野勝寛)	1869–1871	Hyūga-no-kami (日向守)	Lower 5th (従五位下)	17,000 koku
