= Mikusa Domain =

Japanese feudal domain located in Harima Province

Mikusa Domain 三草藩
- under Tokugawa shogunate Japan
- 1746–1871
- Capital: Mikusa jin'ya
- Area
  - Coordinates: 34°56′00.30″N 134°59′41.05″E
  - Type: Daimyō
- Historical era: Edo period
  - Established: 1746
  - Disestablished: 1871
- Today part of: part of Hyōgo Prefecture

Location of Mikusa jin'ya
Mikusa Domain (Japan)

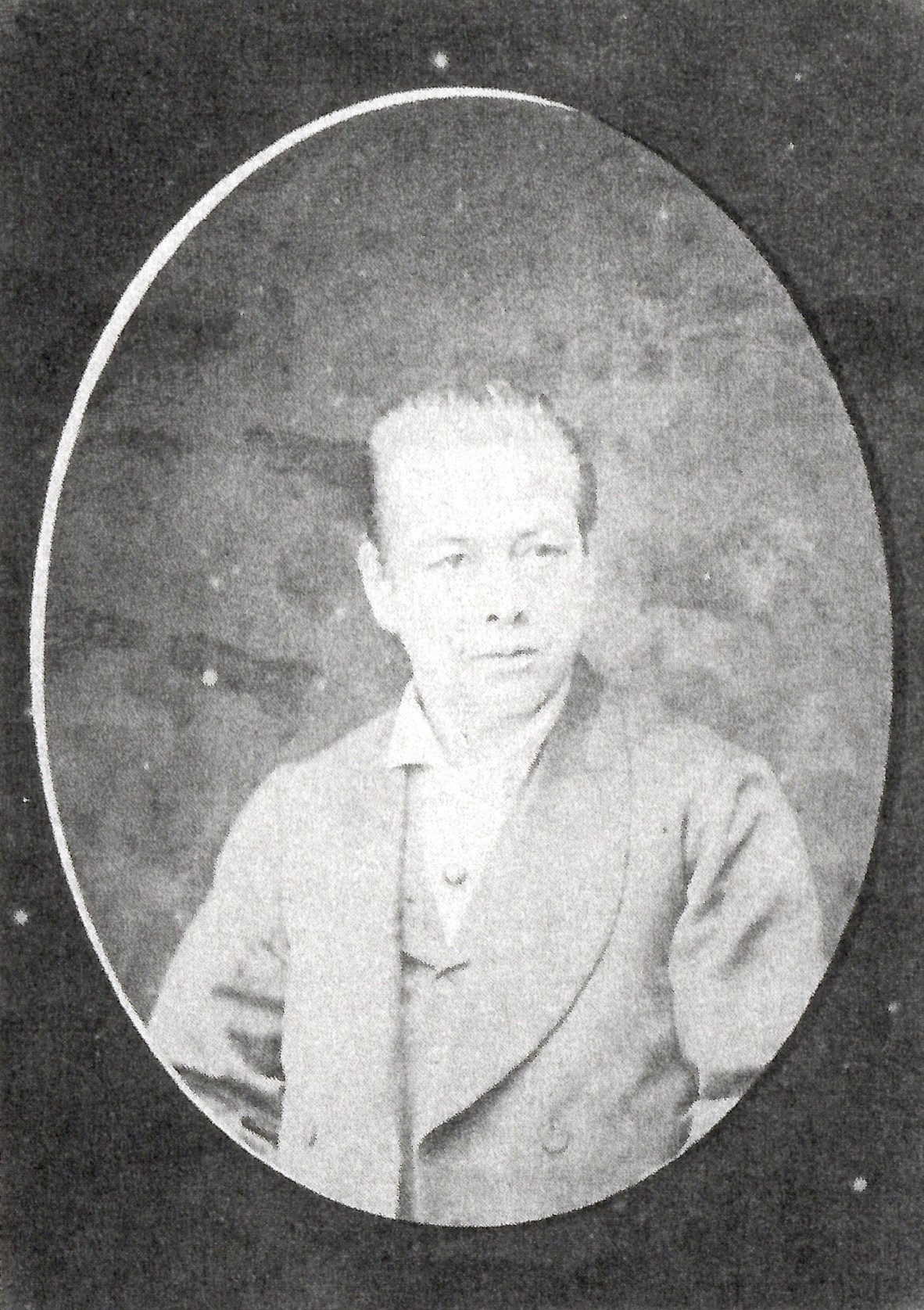
Niwa Ujinori, final daimyō of Mikusa Domain

Mikusa Domain (三草藩, Mikusa-han) was a feudal domain under the Tokugawa shogunate of Edo period Japan, in Harima Province in what is now the southwestern portion of modern-day Hyōgo Prefecture. It was centered around the Mikusa jin'ya which was located in what is now the city of Katō, Hyōgo. It was controlled by a cadet branch fudai daimyō Niwa clan throughout its history.

== History ==
The Isshiki-Niwa clan ruled the20,000 koku Iwamura Domain in Mino Province for five generations from 1638 to 1702. The Isshiki-Niwa clan was a cadet branch of the Ashikaga clan, and was thus no relation to the more famous Niwa Nagahide, although both clans served Oda Nobunaga, and later Tokugawa Ieyasu. The Niwa clan ruled for five generations. Due to internal conflicts created by a reform policy, Niwa Ujioto was demoted to 10,000 koku and reassigned to Takayanagi Domain in Echigo Province. His son, Niwa Shigeuji, served in the guard of Osaka Castle in 1739, and his holdings in Echigo were exchanged for holdings in Kawachi, Harima and Mimasaka Provinces. In 1746, he relocated his seat to Mikusa, marking the start of Mikusa Domain. The Isshiki-Niwa clan was unusual in that they were exempt from the sankin kōtai requirement of alternative year attendance on the Shogun in Edo. The domain was an early supporter of the imperial cause in the Boshin War. In 1871, with the abolition of the han system, the domain became "Mikusa Prefecture", which was merged with "Shikama Prefecture", which in turn became part of Hyōgo Prefecture.

The Isshiki-Niwa clan was ennobled with the kazoku peerage title of shishaku (viscount) in 1884.

== Holdings at the end of the Edo period ==
As with most domains in the han system, Mikusa Domain consisted of several discontinuous territories calculated to provide the assigned kokudaka, based on periodic cadastral surveys and projected agricultural yields.

- Harima Province
  - 3 villages in Minō District
  - 8 villages in Katō District
  - 11 villages in Taka District
  - 11 villages in Kasai District

== List of daimyō ==
#	Name	Tenure	Courtesy title	Court Rank	kokudaka
Niwa clan, 1746-1871 (Fudai)
1	Niwa Shigeuji (丹羽薫氏)	1746 - 1757	Izumi-no-kami (和泉守)	Junior 5th Rank, Lower Grade (従五位下)	10,000 koku
2	Niwa Ujihide (丹羽氏栄)	1757 - 1771	Shikibu-shoyu (式部少輔)	Junior 5th Rank, Lower Grade (従五位下)	10,000 koku
3	Niwa Ujiyoshi (丹羽氏福)	1771 - 1796	Shikibu-shoyu (式部少輔)	Junior 5th Rank, Lower Grade (従五位下)	10,000 koku
4	Niwa Ujiteru (丹羽氏昭)	1796 - 1827	Shikibu-shoyu (式部少輔)	Junior 5th Rank, Lower Grade (従五位下)	10,000 koku
5	Niwa Ujimasa (丹羽氏賢)	1827 - 1854	Wakasa-no-kami (若狭守)	Junior 5th Rank, Lower Grade (従五位下)	10,000 koku
6	Niwa Ujinori (丹羽氏中)	1854 - 1871	Nagato-no-kami (長門守)	Junior 5th Rank, Lower Grade (従五位下)	10,000 koku

== See also ==
- List of Han
- Abolition of the han system
