= Nita (given name) =

Nita is a given name. It is also a short form of the given names Juanita and Bonita. People named Nita include:

- Nita Ambani (born 1964), Indian businesswoman and wife of industrialist Mukesh Ambani
- Nita Jane Ayres, American politician
- Nita Barrow (1916–1995), first and only female Governor-General of Barbados, nurse and humanitarian activist
- Nita Cavalier (1906-1969), American silent film and stage actress.
- Nita Fernando, Sri Lankan actress
- Nita Jamagidze (born 2011), Georgian rhythmic gymnast
- Nita Kibble (1879–1962), first female librarian with the State Library of New South Wales
- Nita Lowey (born 1937), American politician
- Nita Mehta, Indian celebrity chef, author, restaurateur and media personality
- Nita Naldi (1894-1961), American silent film actress
- Nita Strauss, (born 1986), American musician
- Nita Talbot (born 1930), American actress

== Fictional characters ==
- Namorita, a Marvel Comics superhero commonly known as Nita
- Nita, in Disney's direct-to-video animated movie Brother Bear 2
- Nita, a leading character from the Young Wizards fantasy series
- the protagonist of Nita Negrita, a 2011 Philippine television drama
- Katrina Samoushenka, who was named Nita, corrupted from Incognita, by Ted Williamson in The Arcadian Deer in The Labours of Hercules by Agatha Christie
- Nita, a Bear themed character from the mobile shooter video game Brawl Stars

== See also ==
- Nita (disambiguation)
- Nina (name)
- Niña (name)
