= Niță =

Niță is a Romanian surname which may refer to:

- Constantin Niță (born 1955), economist and politician
- Florin Niță (born 1987), footballer
- Norbert Niță (born 1972), retired footballer
- Robert Niță (born 1977), retired footballer
- Sergiu Niţă (1883–1940), politician and lawyer
