= Nipa =

NIPA, Nipa or nipah may refer to:

- Shamim Ara Nipa, Bangladeshi dancer and choreographer
- Nipah~, an onomatopoeia frequently used by Furude Rika, a character in the Japanese visual novel Higurashi When They Cry
- Nipa hut, a type of stilt house indigenous to the cultures of the Philippines
- Nipah virus, a Henipavirus

== NIPA ==
- National Income and Product Accounts, one of the main sources of data on general economic activity in the United States
- National IT Industry Promotion Agency, an IT industry promotion organization operated by the Government of South Korea
- National Institute of Public Administration (Malaysia), a Malaysian government agency responsible for the training of civil servants
- National Institute of Public Administration (Pakistan), a school to impart training for Civil Servants of Pakistan
- NIPA1, a gene in humans that encodes Non-imprinted in Prader-Willi/Angelman syndrome region protein 1
  - NIPA2, a gene in humans that encodes Non-imprinted in Prader-Willi/Angelman syndrome region protein 2

== Plants ==
- Nipa palm, Nypa fruticans
- Nipa grass, Distichlis palmeri
- Pisang Nipah or saba banana, a banana cultivar

== Places ==
- Nipa, a Barangay in Palapag, Philippines
- Nipa Rural LLG in Southern Highlands Province, Papua New Guinea

== See also ==
- Nina (name)
- Niña (name)
- Nypa (disambiguation)
