= Niwa Nagakuni =

Viscount Niwa Nagakuni
- 丹羽長国
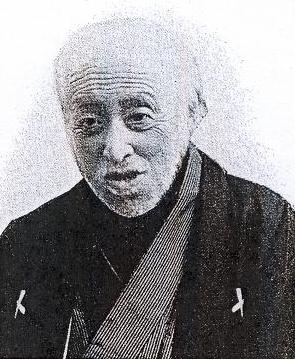
- Niwa Nagakuni, taken in the late 19th century

10th Daimyō of Nihonmatsu Domain
- In office 1858–1868
- Monarchs: Shōgun: Tokugawa Iemochi; Tokugawa Yoshinobu
- Preceded by: Niwa Nagatomi
- Succeeded by: Niwa Nagahiro

Personal details
- Born: May 22, 1834 Nihonmatsu, Japan
- Died: January 15, 1904 (aged 69)
- Resting place: Aoyama Cemetery, Tokyo, Japan
- Spouse: daughter of Toda Ujimasa of Ōgaki Domain
- Parent: Niwa Nagatomi (father)

Viscount Niwa Nagakuni (丹羽長国; May 22, 1834 – January 15, 1904) was an Edo period Japanese samurai, and the 10th daimyō of Nihonmatsu Domain in the Tōhoku region of Japan. He was the 11th hereditary chieftain of the Niwa clan. His courtesy title was Saikyō-no-daifu, and his Court rank was Junior Fourth Rank, Lower Grade.

== Biography ==
Nagakuni, known in his childhood as Hōzō (保蔵) was born in Nihonmatsu on May 22, 1834, the 6th son of Niwa Nagatomi. On November 15, 1858 he succeeded to the family headship upon his father's retirement. He continued the joint coastal defense mission at Tomitsu (together with Aizu han) begun by his father. In April 1864, he was ordered by the Tokugawa shogunate to send military forces to increase security duty in Kyoto due to increasing unrest by pro-Sonnō jōi samurai. In September 1865, he was asked to send troops to Kyoto again. These demands, as well as a fire in the Nihonmatsu jōkamachi, seriously depleted the resources of the domain. These expenses were compounded by the economic difficulties the domain faced following the Tenpō famines, as well as bureaucratic corruption. As a result, Nihonmatsu was utterly economically paralyzed by the end of the Bakumatsu period.

In 1868, with the start of the Boshin War, Nihonmatsu joined the Ōuetsu Reppan Dōmei, but was defeated by the forces of the Satchō Alliance in every engagement. Nihonmatsu Castle fell during the Battle of Nihonmatsu on September 15, 1868 and Niwa Nagakuni fled to Yonezawa Domain. He subsequently made peace with the Meiji government and was ordered to relocated to Tokyo, where he was held under house arrest at the residence of Maebashi Domain. The new government also ordered him to retire from his position, and reduced Nihonmatsu Domain from its kokudaka of 100,700 koku to 50,700 koku. His adopted son Niwa Nagahiro (brother of Uesugi Mochinori of Yonezawa Domain) succeeded him.

In 1869, he was released from house arrest. He outlived both his son and grandson, Niwa Nagayasu, and in 1902 reassumed the chieftainship of the Niwa clan, and also the kazoku title of shishaku (viscount). He died in 1904 and his grave is at Aoyama Cemetery in Tokyo.
