= Mizuno Katsutomo =

Japanese daimyō

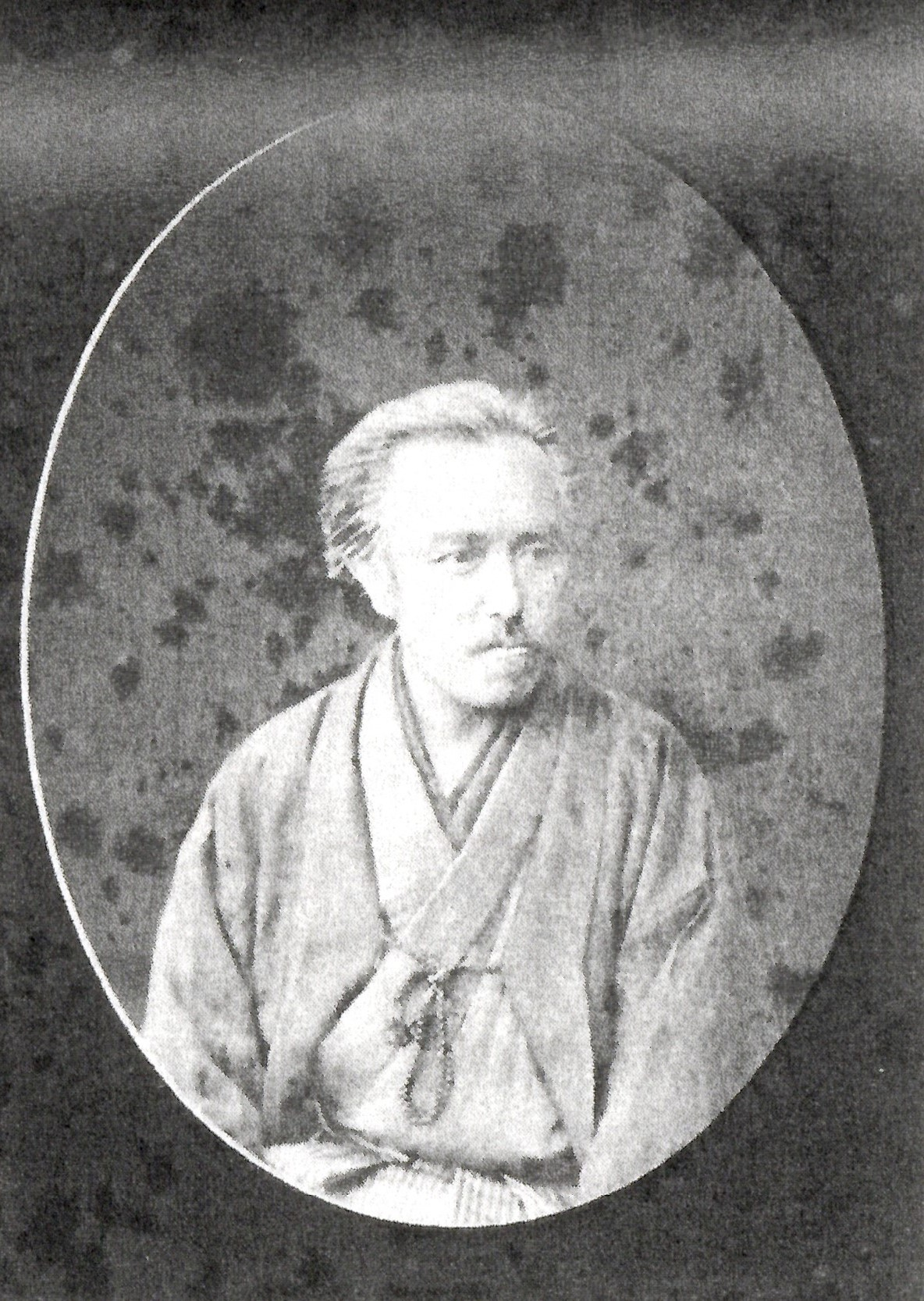

Lord of Yūki
- In office 1862–1869
- Preceded by: Mizuno Katsutō
- Succeeded by: Mizuno Katsuhiro

Personal details
- Born: March 21, 1838
- Died: April 22, 1919 (aged 81)

Mizuno Katsutomo (水野 勝知); (March 21, 1838 – April 22, 1919) was a Japanese daimyō of the late Edo period. Held the title of Hyūga no Kami (日向守). Born the 8th son of Niwa Nagatomi, daimyō of Nihonmatsu (Mutsu Province; 100,000 koku), he was adopted by Mizuno Katsutō, the 14th generation daimyō of Yūki han (Shimōsa Province, 18,000 koku). He succeeded to the family headship in 1862. Katsutomo is known for his opposition to the new government during the Boshin War (1868–1869). Involved in the Battle of Utsunomiya, he nonetheless lost the war along with the northern forces, and was forced to retire and surrender 1,000 koku of his income.

Succeeded by his son Mizuno Katsuhiro, Katsutomo became a viscount in the new nobility.

== Notes ==
Preceded by Mizuno Katsutō	Lord of Yūki; 1862-1869	Succeeded by Mizuno Katsuhiro
