= Norbert Niță =

Romanian footballer and coach

Personal information
- Full name: Norbert Sorin Niță
- Date of birth: 14 January 1972 (age 54)
- Place of birth: Țicleni, Romania
- Height: 1.85 m (6 ft 1 in)
- Position: Defender

Senior career*
Years	Team	Apps	(Gls)
1994–1995	Jiul IELIF Craiova	42	(5)
1996–1998	Electroputere Craiova	38	(2)
1998–2001	Farul Constanța	65	(4)
2001–2003	Uralan Elista	7	(0)
2004–2005	Midia Năvodari	?	(?)
Total		152	(11)

Managerial career
- 2016: Voluntari (assistant)
- 2016–2017: Delta Dobrogea Tulcea (assistant)
- 2018: Poli Timișoara
- * Club domestic league appearances and goals

Norbert Sorin Niță (born 14 January 1972) is a Romanian football coach and a former player.
