= Neetu =

Neetu is a female given name. Notable people with the name include:

- Neetu Chandra (born 1984), Indian film actress, model, and martial artist
- Neetu David (born 1977), Indian cricketer
- Neetu Singh (born 1958), Indian actress
- Neetu Singh (born 1990), Indian actress and model
