= Niwa Nagahiro =

Daimyo who ruled the Nihonmatsu han

Viscount Niwa Nagahiro
- 丹羽長裕
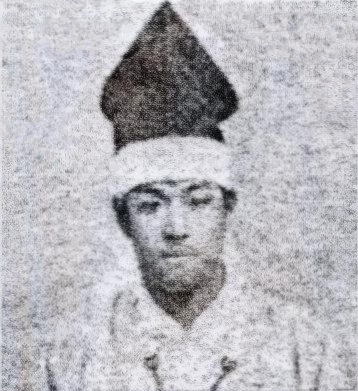
- Niwa Nagahiro, at time of the Boshin War

11th Daimyō of Nihonmatsu Domain
- In office 1868–1869
- Monarch: Emperor Meiji
- Preceded by: Niwa Nagakuni
- Succeeded by: -none-

Imperial Governor Nihonmatsu Domain
- In office 1869–1871
- Monarch: Emperor Meiji
- Preceded by: -none-
- Succeeded by: -none-

Personal details
- Born: April 17, 1859
- Died: July 29, 1886 (aged 27)
- Spouse(s): Mine, eldest daughter of Niwa Nagakuni
- Parent: Uesugi Narinori (father)

Viscount Niwa Nagahiro (丹羽長裕; April 17, 1859 – July 29, 1886) was a Bakumatsu period Japanese samurai, and the 11th (and final) daimyō of Nihonmatsu Domain in the Tōhoku region of Japan. He was the 12th hereditary chieftain of the Niwa clan.

Nagahiro was the 9th son of Uesugi Narinori of Yonezawa Domain; his mother was a daughter of Matsudaira Yorihiro of Takamatsu Domain. He was married to the eldest daughter of Niwa Nagakuni. Following the defeat of Nihonmatsu Domain during the Boshin War in 1868, Nagakuni was placed under house arrest in Tokyo by the new Meiji government, which also ordered him to retire. Nagakuni formally adopted his son-in-law, Nagahiro who then became daimyō, with Nihonmatsu reduced to 50,000 koku in its kokudaka (half of what it had previously held). When the post of daimyō was abolished, Nagahiro remained as Imperial governor of Nihonmatsu until the abolition of the han system.

In 1884, with the creation of the kazoku peerage system, he received the peerage title of shishaku (viscount). He died in 1886 and his birth brother Nagayasu (Uesugi Narinori's 11th son) became the 13th chieftain of the Niwa clan.
