= Țicleni =

- Town
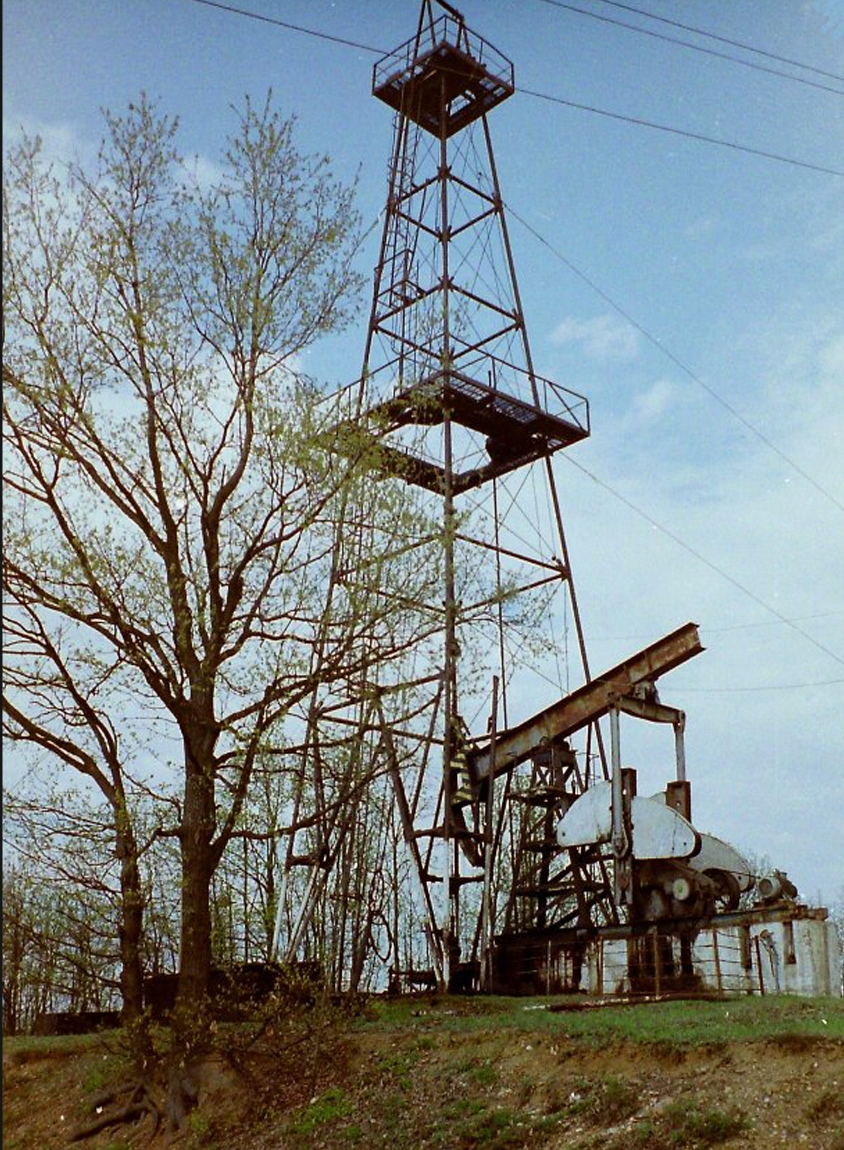

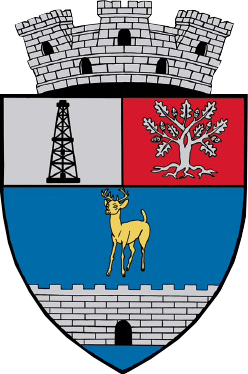
- Coat of arms

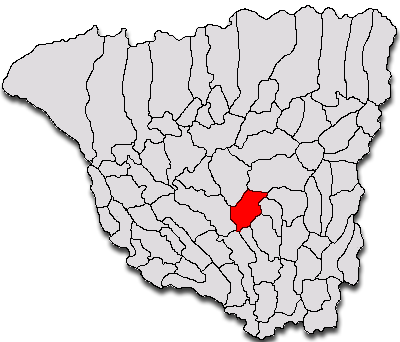
- Location in Gorj County

- Location in Romania
- Coordinates: 44°52′N 23°24′E
- Country: Romania
- County: Gorj

Government
  - Mayor (2024–2028): Constantin Radu (PSD)
- Area: 72.29 km^{2} (27.91 sq mi)
- Elevation: 180 m (590 ft)
- Population (2021-12-01): 3,934
  - Density: 54.42/km^{2} (140.9/sq mi)
- Time zone: UTC+02:00 (EET)
  - Summer (DST): UTC+03:00 (EEST)
- Postal code: 215600
- Area code: (+40) 02 53
- Vehicle reg.: GJ
- Website: www.primarieticleni.ro

Historical population
Year	Pop.	±%
1977	5,161	—
1992	5,372	+4.1%
2002	5,205	−3.1%
2011	4,357	−16.3%
2021	3,934	−9.7%
Source: Census data

Țicleni is a town in Gorj County, Oltenia, Romania.

It is a community developed around the exploitation of extractive industries: oil and natural gas. The relief is predominantly hilly, with deciduous forests (some are century-old oaks) and conifers, with views of great beauty. Fauna includes rabbits, deer, foxes, wild boar.

Of the county's nine cities and towns, Țicleni is in sixth place in terms of population.

It was raised to the status of town in 1968. It is established by uniting three main parts, from north to south: Tunși, Țicleni, and Gura Lumezii, plus 3 former settlements of workers in the oil field, now upgraded.

The town has a stadium and owns a football team, FC Petrolul Țicleni. In the past here was a spa with warm water. The town has medical units, a gymnasium, four primary schools, five kindergartens, four churches, a municipal library, a High School of Industrial Oil, restaurants, general stores and a local television station.

== Natives ==
- Norbert Niță (born 1972), football coach and former player

== Sites and Monuments ==
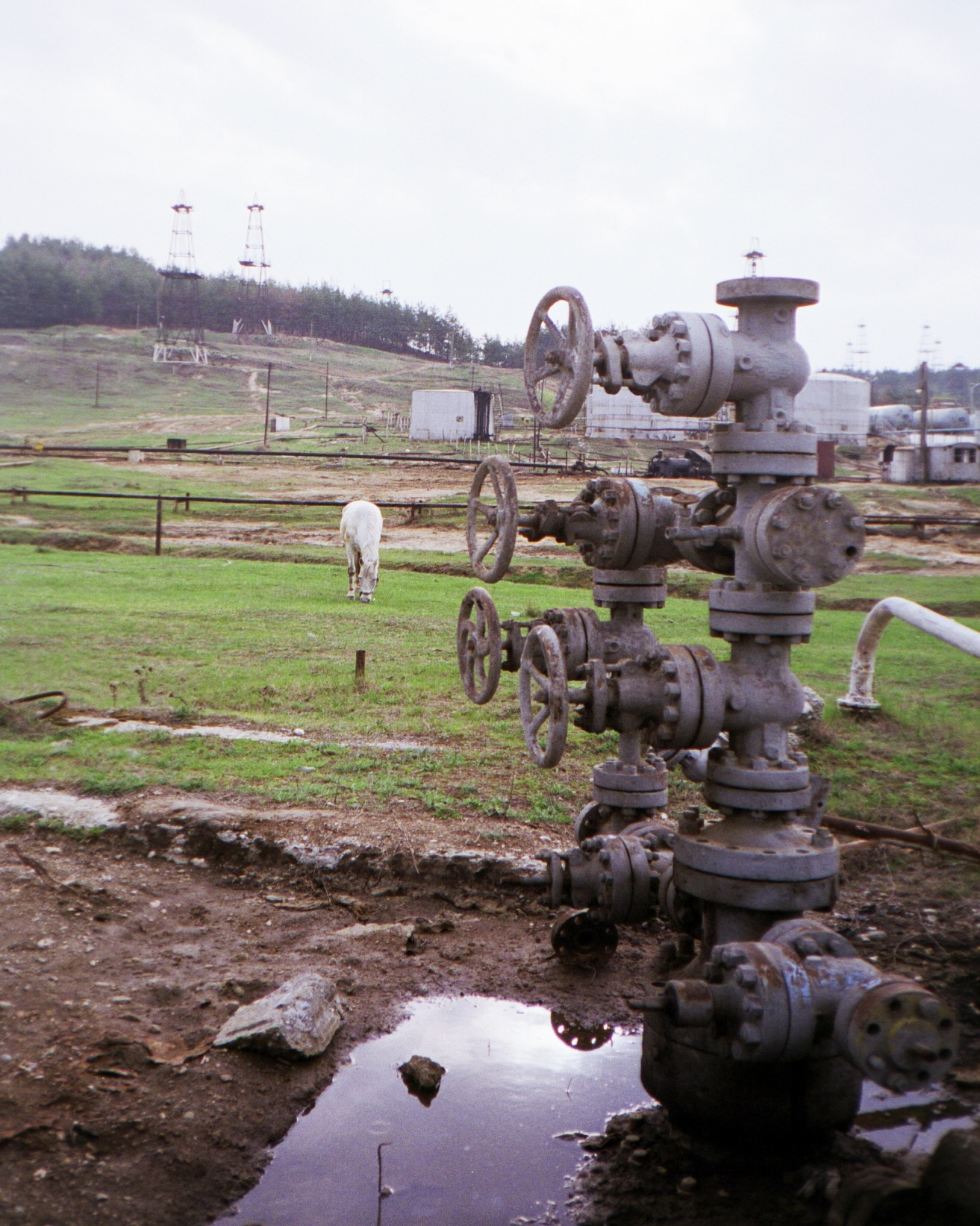
Pipeline head

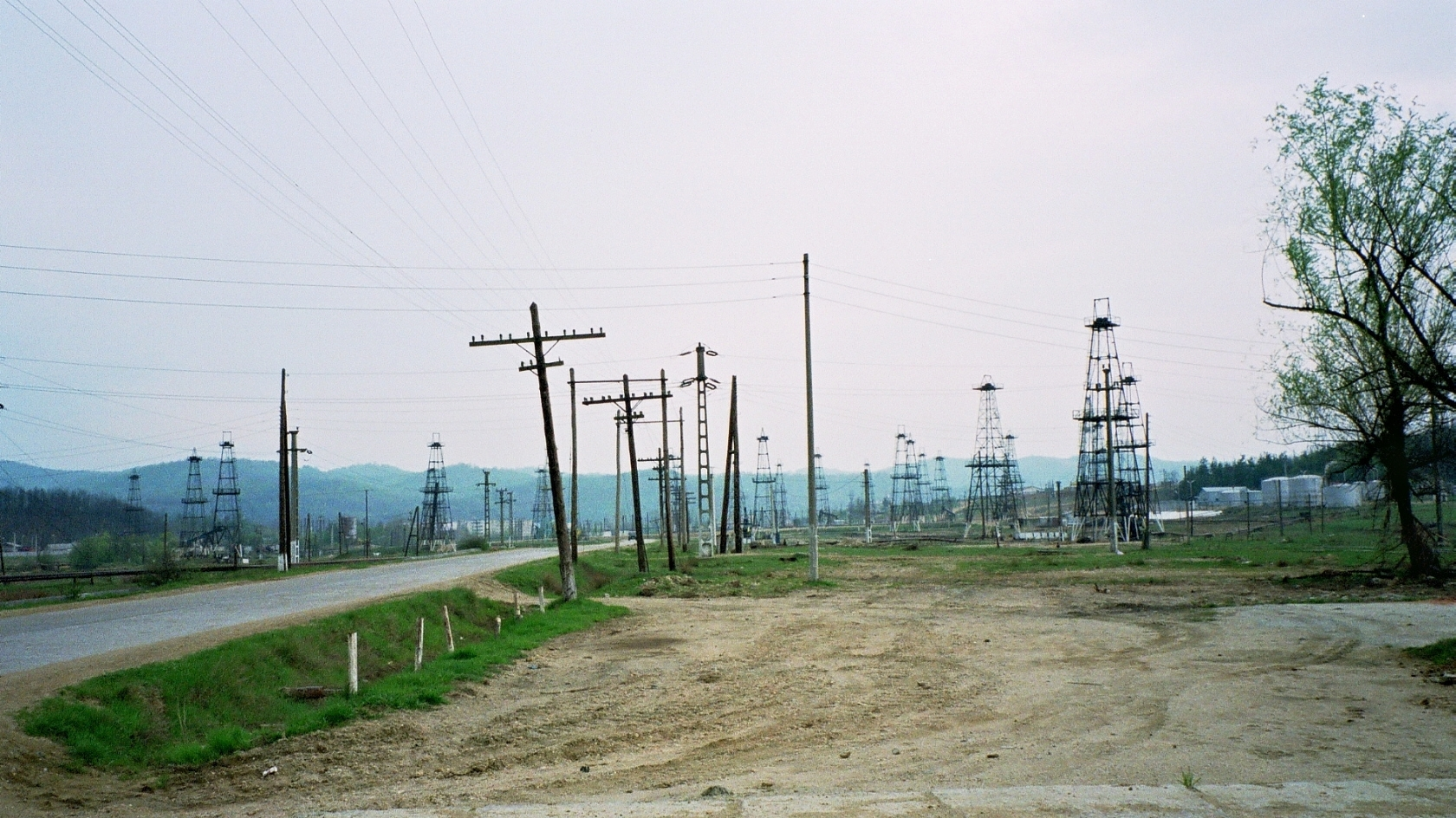
Derrick in the village

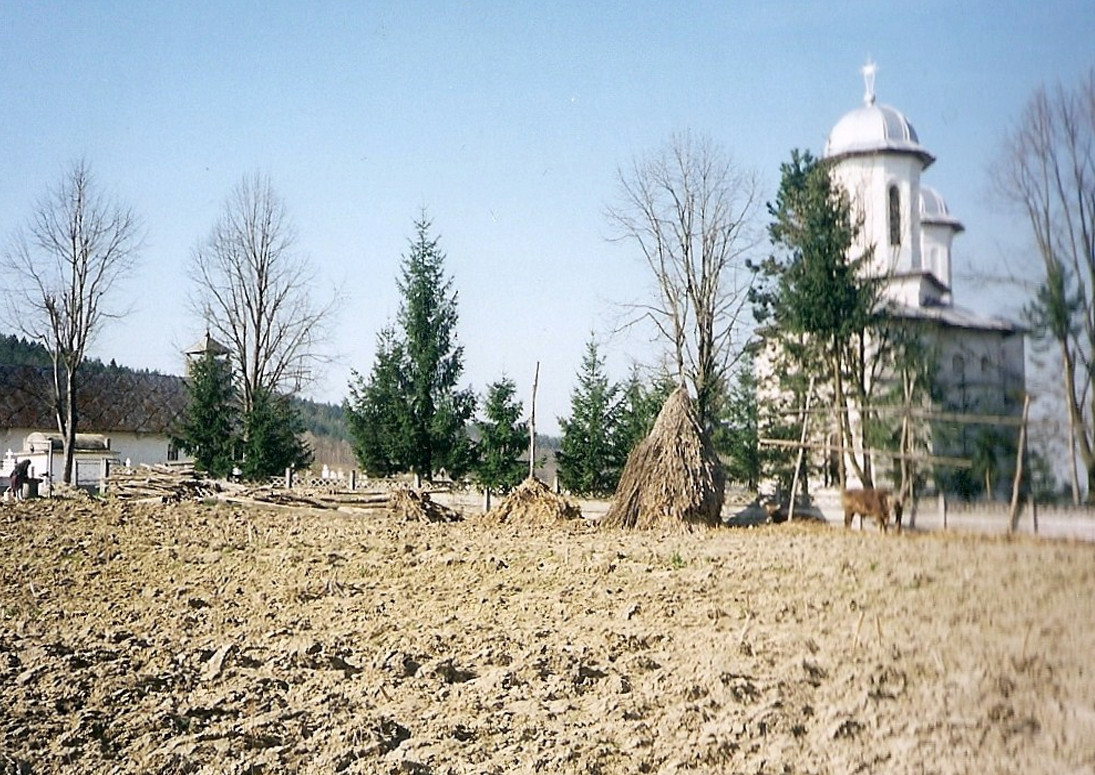
Orthodox Church

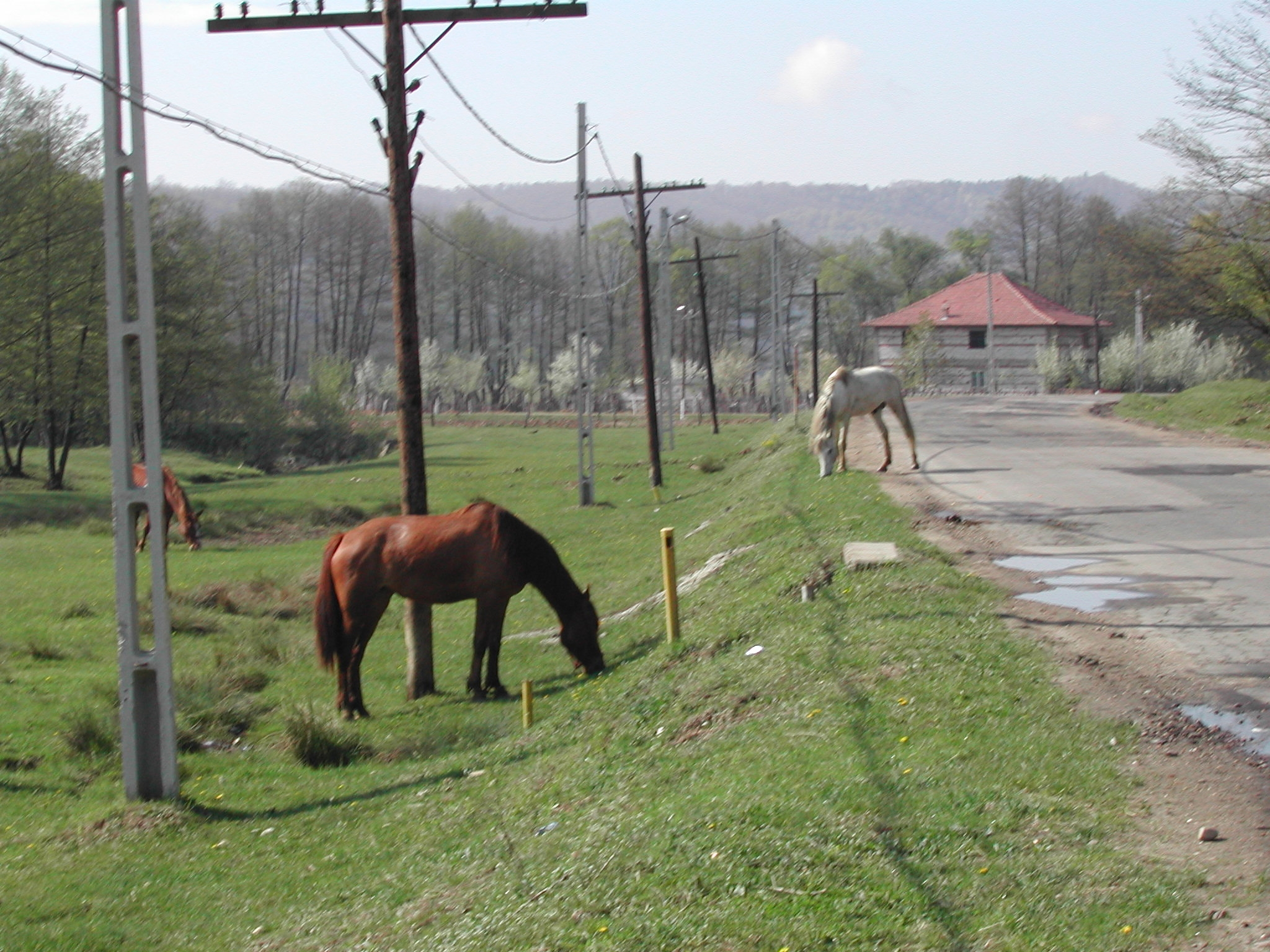
Main Street

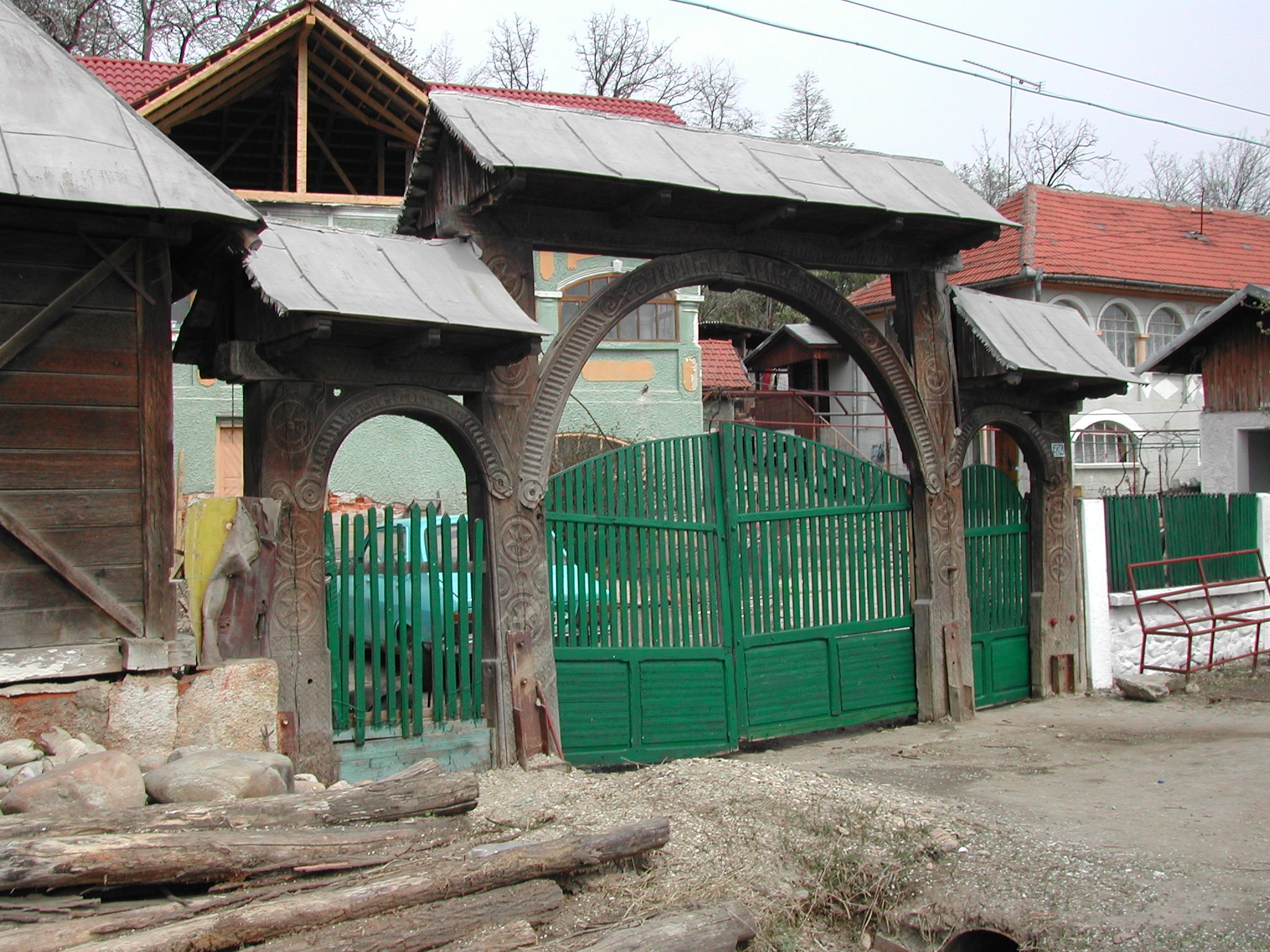
Main Street

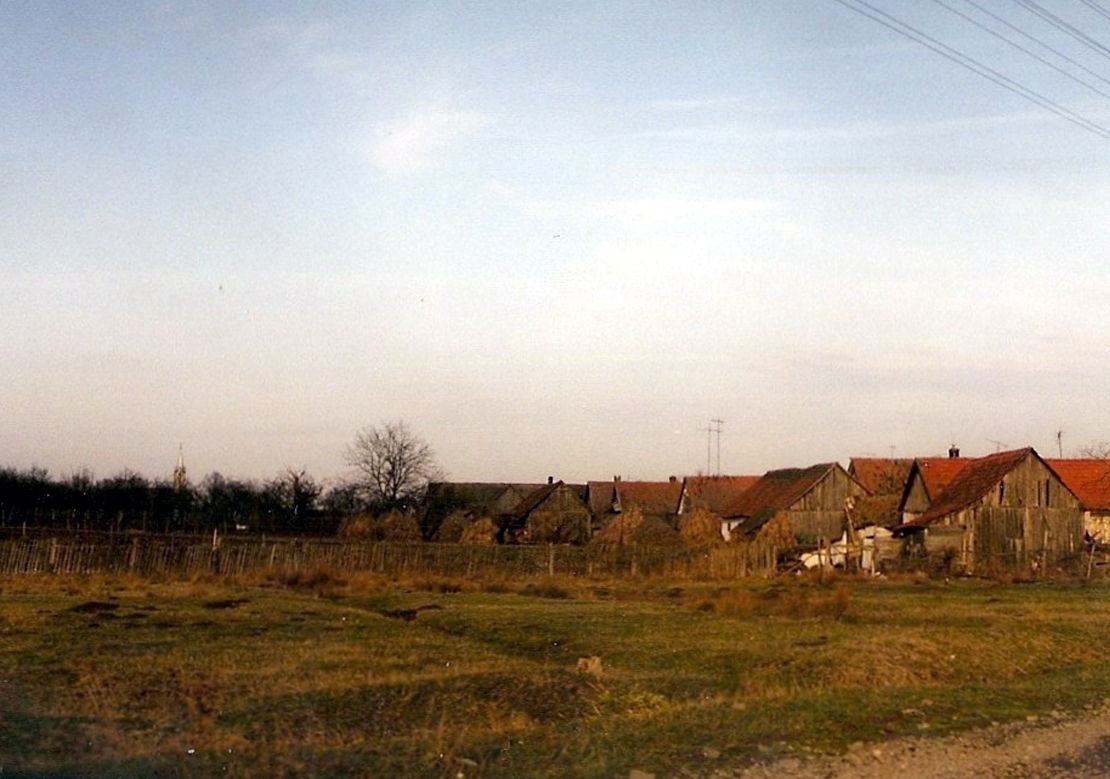
The village

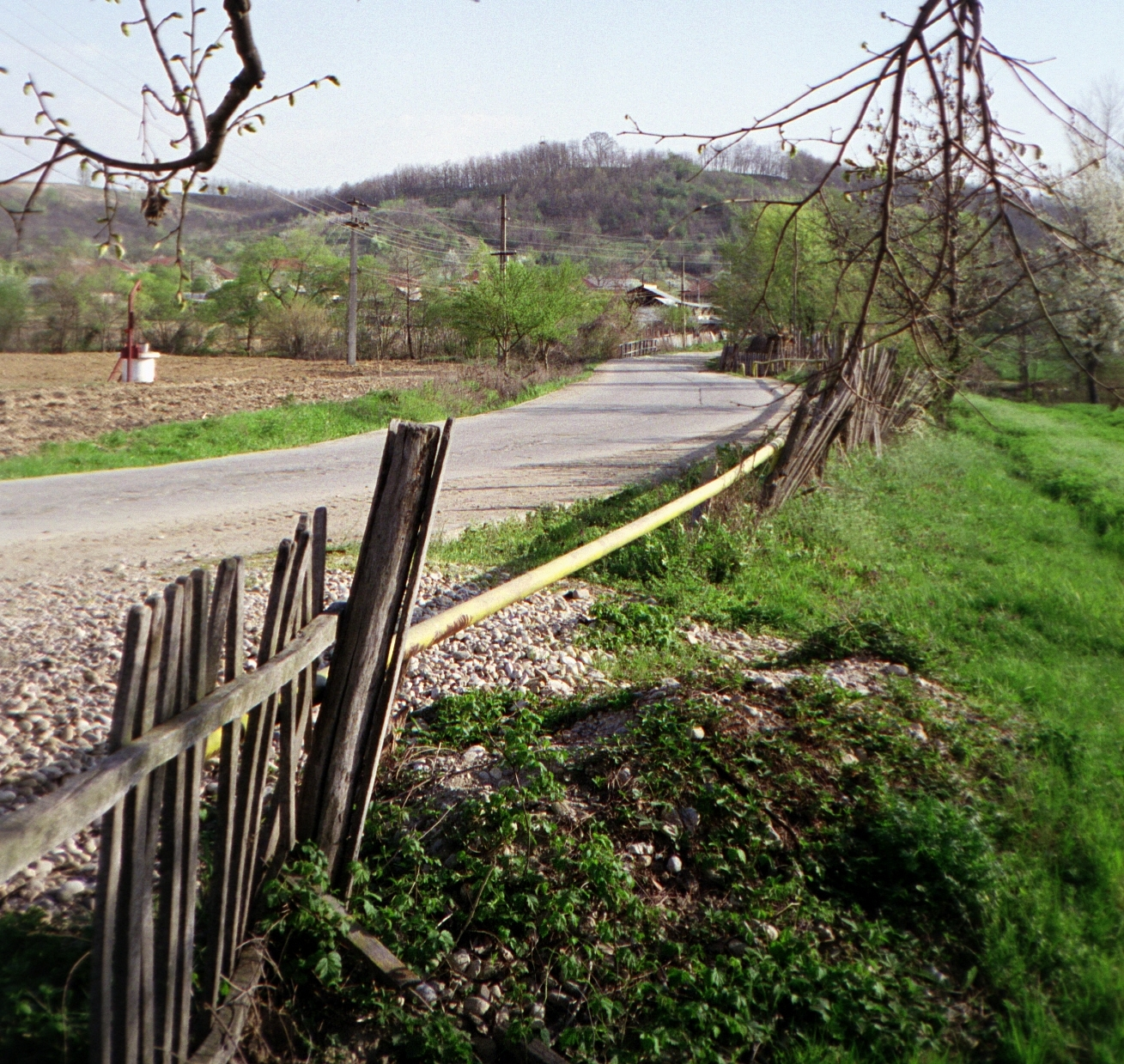
The village
