= Nihonmatsu Domain =

Feudal domain under the Tokugawa shogunate of Edo period Japan

Nihonmatsu Domain 二本松藩
- under Tokugawa shogunate Japan
- 1627–1871
- Capital: Nihonmatsu Castle
- Area
  - Coordinates: 37°35′59″N 140°25′41″E
- Government
  - Type: Daimyō
- Historical era: Edo period
  - split from Aizu Domain: 1627
  - Matsushita: 1627
  - Katō: 1628
  - Niwa: 1641
  - Disestablished: 1871
- Today part of: part of Fukushima Prefecture

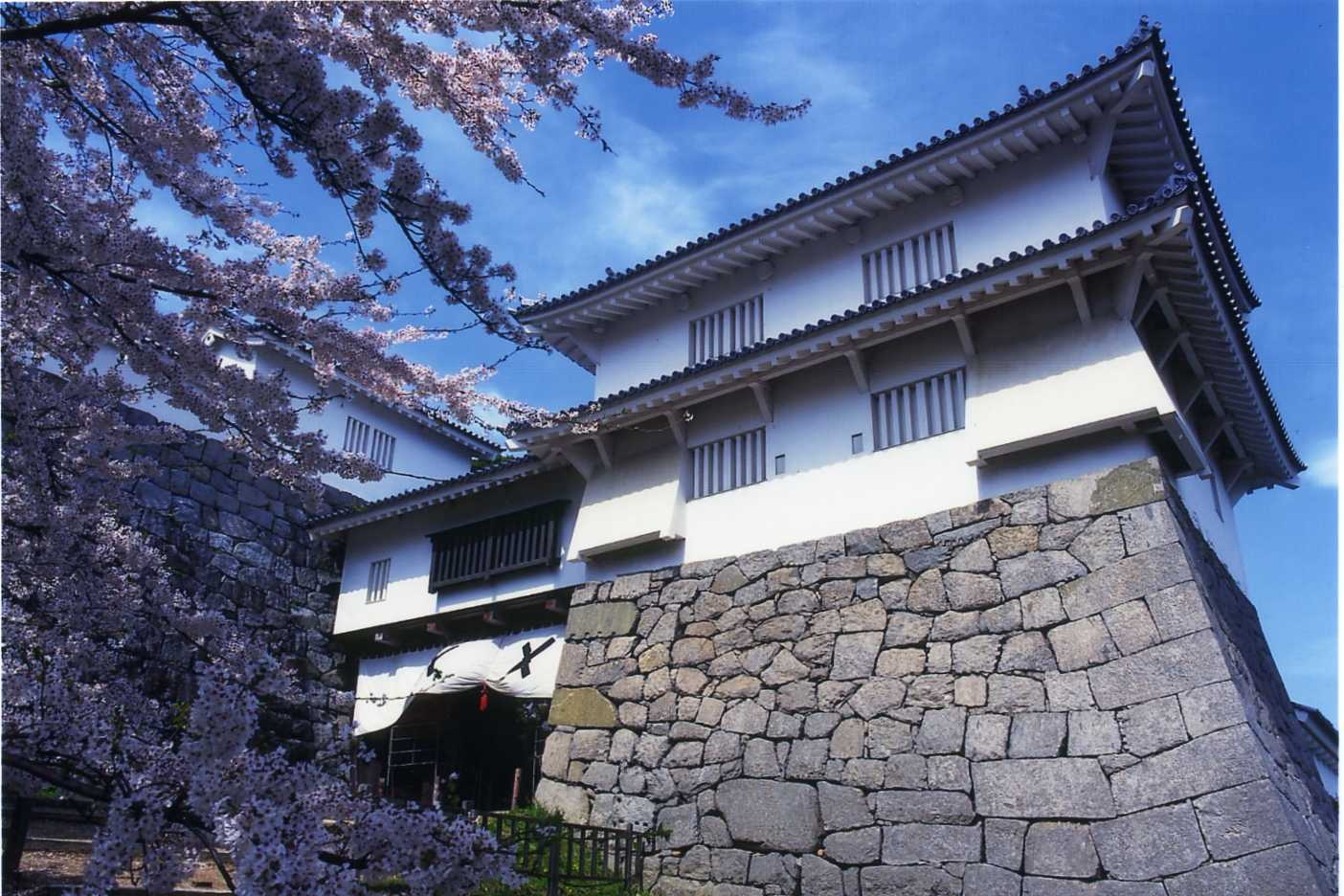
Nihonmatsu castle, administrative center of Nihonmatsu Domain

Nihonmatsu Domain (二本松藩, Nihonmatsu-han) was a feudal domain under the Tokugawa shogunate of Edo period Japan, located in southern Mutsu Province. It was centered on Nihonmatsu Castle in what is now the city of Nihonmatsu, Fukushima, and its territory included all of Nihonmatsu, Motomiya, Ōtama and most of the present-day city of Kōriyama. For most of its history it was ruled by the Niwa clan. The Nihonmatsu Domain was also the scene of a major battle of the Boshin War of the Meiji Restoration.

== History ==
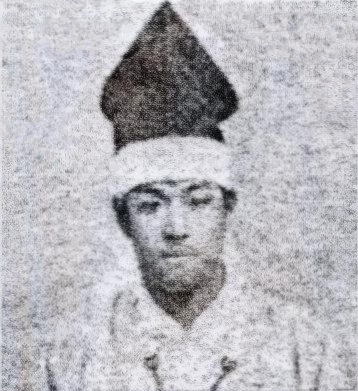
Niwa Nagahiro, last daimyō of Nihonmatsu

The area around Nihonmatsu was territory of the Hatakeyama clan during the late Kamakura and Muromachi periods. In 1586, Date Masamune destroyed the Hatakeyama and annexed the area to his territories. However, following the Siege of Odawara (1590), Toyotomi Hideyoshi reassigned the area to Aizu Domain under the rule of the Gamō clan. Hideyoshi later reduced the holdings of the Gamō clan, giving Nihonmatsu and surrounding areas to Asano Nagamasa. This change was very short-lived, as Aizu domain was then reassigned to the Uesugi clan, and their holdings were expanded to encompass Nihonmatsu. The Uesugi were then shifted to Yonezawa Domain following the Battle of Sekigahara by Tokugawa Ieyasu. The Gamō recovered Nihonmatsu, but the domain was soon beset by a variety of natural disasters, including a massive earthquake, bad weather and flooding, leading to crop failure and widespread famine. This in turn led to a peasant revolt, and the Gamō clan was eventually dispossessed by the Tokugawa shogunate and sent to Iyo Province in Shikoku.

In 1627, Matsushita Shigetsuna, daimyō of Karasuyama Domain and the son-in-law of Katō Yoshiaki was transferred to the re-established Nihonmatsu Domain, with a kokudaka of 50,000 koku. He died a few months later, and his son was transferred to the much smaller Miharu Domain in 1628.

The Matsushita were replaced by Katō Akitoshi, the third son of Katō Yoshiaki, who had formerly held Miharu Domain. The Katō clan took steps to increase their revenues by development of new rice lands and development of non-rice based sources of income. However, their efforts were complicated by increasing demands for military support from the shogunate in policing the northern frontier areas of Ezo. The situation became critical in 1642–1643, after a crop failure. Many peasants were forced to sell themselves into servitude to pay for the high taxation, leading to unrest and even a revolt by senior retainers. As a result, the Katō were replaced by the Niwa clan, formerly of Shirakawa Domain, with an increase in the nominal kokudaka of the domain to 100,700 koku.

The Niwa rebuilt Nihonmatsu Castle and reformed the domain's financial situation and remained in control of Nihonmatsu until the Meiji Restoration. The Niwa clan had sided against the Tokugawa at the Battle of Sekigahara and was dispossessed. The victorious Tokugawa Ieyasu chose to be magnanimous, and with the establishment of the Tokugawa shogunate, awarded Niwa Nagashige with a 10,000 koku domain in Hitachi Province. Nagashige's forces fought well at the 1614 Siege of Osaka, and in 1619 his revenues were increased to 20,000 koku, and in 1622 he was transferred to the 50,000 koku Tanakura Domain in Mutsu Province. In 1627, he was transferred once again to Shirakawa Domain, at 100,700 koku. They were assigned repair work on the Nikkō Tōshōgū, Zōjō-ji and various tasks by Tokugawa shogunate which proved a severe drain on their resources. Despite efforts at fiscal and land reform, the domain was deeply in debt, which was complicated during the time of the 7th daimyō, Niwa Nagayoshi, when the Great Tenmei famine struck. The 9th daimyō, Niwa Nagatomi, built a han school, but also suffered a problem when some of his senior retainers absconded with 3400 ryō of domain funds shortly before the domain was hit by the Tenpō famine. During the Bakumatsu period, the 10th daimyō, Niwa Nagakuni, was assigned to the defense of Edo Bay, and with the start of the Boshin War, joined the Ōuetsu Reppan Dōmei. The domain’s forces were defeated in battle by the Satchō Alliance, Nihonmatsu Castle was burned, and he was forced to flee to Yonezawa Domain. His successor, Niwa Nagahiro made peace with the imperial forces but with a domain reduced in status to 50,700 koku.

After the abolition of the han system in July 1871, Nihonmatsu became part of Nihonmatsu Prefecture, which later became part of Fukushima Prefecture.

== Holdings at the end of the Edo period ==
As with most domains in the han system, Nihonmatsu Domain consisted of several discontinuous territories calculated to provide the assigned kokudaka, based on periodic cadastral surveys and projected agricultural yields.

- Mutsu Province (Iwashiro Province)
  - 74 villages in Adachi District
  - 42 villages in Shinobu District
  - 37 villages in Asaka District

== List of daimyō ==
#	Name	Tenure	Courtesy title	Court Rank	kokudaka	Notes
Matsushita clan (tozama) 1627-1628
1	Matsushita Shigetsuna (松下重綱)	1627–1627	Iwami-no-kami (石見守)	Junior 5th Rank, Lower Grade (従五位下)	30,000 koku	Transfer from Karasuyama Domain
2	Matsushita Nagastsuna (松下長綱)	1627–1628	Iwami-no-kami (石見守)	Junior 5th Rank, Lower Grade (従五位下)	30,000 koku	Transfer to Miharu Domain
Katō clan (tozama) 1628–1641
1	Katō Akitoshi (加藤明利)	1628–1641	Minbu-daifu (民部大輔)	Junior 5th Rank, Lower Grade (従五位下)	30,000 koku	Transfer from Miharu Domain
Niwa clan (tozama) 1641–1871
1	Niwa Mitsushige (丹羽光重)	1643–1679	Sakyō-no-daifu (左京大夫); Jijū(侍従)	Junior 4th Rank, Lower Grade (従四位下)	100,700 koku	Transfer from Shirakawa Domain
2	Niwa Nagatsugu (丹羽長次)	1679–1698	Sakyō-no-daifu (左京大夫);	Junior 4th Rank, Lower Grade (従四位下)	100,700 koku	
3	Niwa Nagayuki (丹羽長之)	1698–1700	Echizen-no-kami (越前守)	Junior 5th Rank, Lower Grade (従五位下)	100,700 koku	
4	Niwa Hidenobu (丹羽秀延)	1701–1728	Sakyō-no-daifu (左京大夫);	Junior 4th Rank, Lower Grade (従四位下)	100,700 koku	
5	Niwa Takahiro (丹羽高寛)	1728–1745	Sakyō-no-daifu (左京大夫);	Junior 4th Rank, Lower Grade (従四位下)	100,700 koku	
6	Niwa Takayasu (丹羽高庸)	1745–1765	Wakasa-no-kami (若狭守);	Junior 4th Rank, Lower Grade (従四位下)	100,700 koku	
7	Niwa Nagayoshi (丹羽長貴)	1766–1796	Sakyō-no-daifu (左京大夫); Jijū(侍従)	Junior 4th Rank, Lower Grade (従四位下)	100,700 koku	
8	Niwa Nagaakira (丹羽長祥)	1796–1813	Sakyō-no-daifu (左京大夫);	Junior 4th Rank, Lower Grade (従四位下)	100,700 koku	
9	Niwa Nagatomi (丹羽長富)	1813–1858	Sakyō-no-daifu (左京大夫); Jijū(侍従)	Junior 4th Rank, Lower Grade (従四位下))	100,700 koku	
10	Niwa Nagakuni (丹羽長国)	1858–1868	Sakyō-no-daifu (左京大夫); Jijū(侍従)	Junior 4th Rank, Lower Grade (従四位下)	100,700 → 50,700 koku	
11	Niwa Nagahiro (丹羽長裕)	1868–1871	-none-	Junior 5th (五位下)	50,700 koku	

=== Niwa Mitsushige ===
Niwa Mitsushige (丹羽光重; February 8, 1622 – May 18, 1701) was the 2nd Niwa daimyō of Shirakawa Domain, and 2nd hereditary chieftain of the Niwa clan. Mitsushige was the third son of Niwa Nagashige. As both of his older brothers died in childhood, he was named heir in 1628. In 1634, he was received in formal audience by Shōgun Tokugawa Iemitsu, and received a kanji from Iemitsu's name, becoming Niwa Mitsushige. In 1643, the Tokugawa shogunate ordered the Niwa clan to relocate to Nihonmatsu. Upon entering Nihonmatsu Castle in 1644, he immediately embarked on a program to rebuild the surrounding jōkamachi. Mitsushige was also noted as a patron of the arts, and especially favoured the Sekishū-branch of the Japanese tea ceremony. He was also a painter, having been trained in the Kanō school, using the pseudonym Gyokuhō (玉峰). He retired from public life in 1679, turning the domain over to his eldest son Niwa Nagatsugu. He died in 1701. His courtesy title was Saikyō-no-daifu, and his Court rank was Junior Fourth Rank, Lower Grade.

=== Niwa Nagatsugu ===
Niwa Nagatsugu (丹羽長次; October 27, 1643 - August 2, 1698) was the 2nd Niwa daimyō of Nihonmatsu Domain, and 3rd hereditary chieftain of the Niwa clan. His courtesy title was Saikyō-no-daifu, and his Court rank was Junior Fourth Rank, Lower Grade. He was the eldest son of Niwa Mitsushige, and was received in formal audience by Shōgun Tokugawa Ietsuna in 1653. He became daimyō in 1679 on the retirement of his father. He did not share his father's love of the arts, or of Confucianism, and his tenure was largely uneventful. In 1692, he received the honorary court title of chamberlain (Jijū) shortly before his death. As he had no son, the domain went to his younger brother.

=== Niwa Nagayuki ===
Niwa Nagayuki (丹羽長之; April 15, 1656 - January 15, 1701) was the 3rd Niwa daimyō of Nihonmatsu Domain, and 4th hereditary chieftain of the Niwa clan. His courtesy title was Echizen-no-kami, and his Court rank was Junior Fifth Rank, Lower Grade. He was the younger brother of Niwa Nagatsugu, and was received in formal audience by Shōgun Tokugawa Tsunayoshi in 1684. He became daimyō in 1692 on the death of his brother. He had a son and daughter by a concubine, but never took a formal wife. His grave is at the temple of Dairin-ji in Nihonmatsu.

=== Niwa Hidenobu ===
Niwa Hidenobu (丹羽秀延; 1690 - June 11, 1728) was the 4th Niwa daimyō of Nihonmatsu Domain, and 5th hereditary chieftain of the Niwa clan. His courtesy title was Saikyō-no-daifu, and his Court rank was Junior Fourth Rank, Lower Grade. He was the eldest son of Niwa Nagayuki and became daimyō in 1701 on the death of his brother. He was received in formal audience by Shōgun Tokugawa Tsunayoshi the same year. His wife was a daughter of Abe Masakune of Fukuyama Domain. He died in 1728 without heir. His grave is at the temple of Dairin-ji in Nihonmatsu.

=== Niwa Takahiro ===
Niwa Takahiro (丹羽高寛; January 27, 1708 - August 1, 1769) was the 5th Niwa daimyō of Nihonmatsu Domain, and 6th hereditary chieftain of the Niwa clan. His courtesy title was Saikyō-no-daifu, and his Court rank was Junior Fourth Rank, Lower Grade. He was a hatamoto descendant of the sixth son of Niwa Nagahide and was posthumously adopted by the childless Niwa Hidenobu to become daimyō in 1728. He was received in formal audience by Sh Jijū gun Tokugawa Yoshimune the same year. His wife was a daughter of Niwa Nagayuki. He retired in 1745 due to illness. He died in 1769. His grave is at the temple of Dairin-ji in Nihonmatsu.

=== Niwa Takayasu ===
Niwa Takayasu (丹羽高庸; March 27, 1730 - January 24, 1766) was the 6th Niwa daimyō of Nihonmatsu Domain, and 7th hereditary chieftain of the Niwa clan. His courtesy title was Wakasa-no-kami, and his Court rank was Junior Fourth Rank, Lower Grade. He was the eldest son of Niwa Takahiro and was received in formal audience by Shōgun Tokugawa Yoshimune in 1741. He became daimyō in 1745 on the retirement of his father. In 1747, the domain was ordered by the shogunate to undertake flood control projects on the Kiso, Ibi and Nagara Rivers in Owari Province, work which was part of the 1754 Hōreki River incident. Takayasu was married to a daughter of Tokugawa Munenao of Kishū Domain. He predeceased his father in 1766. His grave is at the temple of Dairin-ji in Nihonmatsu.

=== Niwa Nagayoshi ===
Niwa Nagayoshi (丹羽長貴; June 15, 1756 - May 4, 1796) was the 7th Niwa daimyō of Nihonmatsu Domain, and 8th hereditary chieftain of the Niwa clan. His courtesy title was Saikyō-no-daifu, and his Court rank was Junior Fourth Rank, Lower Grade. He was the eldest son of Niwa Takayasu by a concubine and became daimyō in 1766 on the death of his father. He was received in formal audience by Shōgun Tokugawa Ieharu the same year. He was married to a daughter of Date Muratoki of Uwajima Domain. During his tenure, the domain suffered from the effects of the Great Tenmei famine. He died in 1796 and his grave is at the temple of Dairin-ji in Nihonmatsu.

=== Niwa Nagaakira ===
Niwa Nagaakira (丹羽長貴; November 18, 1780 - September 9, 1813) was the 8th Niwa daimyō of Nihonmatsu Domain, and 9th hereditary chieftain of the Niwa clan. His courtesy title was Saikyō-no-daifu, and his Court rank was Junior Fourth Rank, Lower Grade. He was the eldest son of Niwa Nagayoshi by a concubine. He was received in formal audience by Shōgun Tokugawa Ienari in 1792, and became daimyō in 1796 on the death of his father. He was married to a daughter of Arima Yoritaka of Kurume Domain. He died in 1813 and his grave is at the temple of Dairin-ji in Nihonmatsu.

=== Niwa Nagatomi ===
Niwa Nagatomi (丹羽長富; October 12, 1803 - August 2, 1866) was the 9th Niwa daimyō of Nihonmatsu Domain, and 10th hereditary chieftain of the Niwa clan. His courtesy title was Saikyō-no-daifu, and his Court rank was Junior Fourth Rank, Lower Grade. He was the eldest son of Niwa Nagaakira by a concubine. He became daimyō in 1813 on the death of his father and ruled Nihonmatsu Domain. He built a han school. He retired in 1858. He was married to a daughter of Arima Yorinao of Kurume Domain. He died in 1866 and his grave is at the temple of Dairin-ji in Nihonmatsu.

=== Niwa Nagakuni ===
Niwa Nagakuni (丹羽長国; May 22, 1834 – January 15, 1904) was the 10th daimyō of Nihonmatsu Domain, and the 11th hereditary chieftain of the Niwa clan. His courtesy title was Saikyō-no-daifu, and his Court rank]was Junior Fourth Rank, Lower Grade. Nagakuni was born in Nihonmatsu as the 6th son of Niwa Nagatomi. He succeeded to the family headship upon his father's retirement in 1858. He was ordered by the Tokugawa shogunate to send military forces to increase security in Kyoto in 1864 and 1865. In 1868, with the start of the Boshin War, Nihonmatsu joined the Ōuetsu Reppan Dōmei, but was defeated by the forces of the Satchō Alliance, with Nihonmatsu Castle burning down during the Battle of Nihonmatsu on September 15, 1868. He subsequently made peace with the Meiji government, which ordered him to retire, and which reduced Nihonmatsu Domain from its previous kokudaka of 100,700 koku to 50,700 koku. After the deaths of his son and grandson, he reassumed the chieftainship of the Niwa clan in 1902, and also the kazoku title of shishaku (viscount). He died in 1904 and his grave is at Aoyama Cemetery in Tokyo.

=== Niwa Nagahiro ===
Viscount Niwa Nagahiro (丹羽長裕; April 17, 1859 – July 29, 1886) was the 11th (and final) daimyō of Nihonmatsu Domain and the 12th hereditary chieftain of the Niwa clan. Nagahiro was the 9th son of Uesugi Narinori of Yonezawa Domain; his mother was a daughter of Matsudaira Yorihiro of Takamatsu Domain. He was married to the eldest daughter of Niwa Nagakuni. Following the defeat of Nihonmatsu Domain during the Boshin War in 1868, Nagakuni was placed under house arrest in Tokyo by the new Meiji government, which also ordered him to retire. Nagakuni formally adopted his son-in-law, Nagahiro who then became daimyō, with Nihonmatsu reduced to 50,700 koku (half of what it had previously held). When the post of daimyō was abolished, Nagahiro remained as Imperial governor of Nihonmatsu until the abolition of the han system. Nihonmatsu was incorporated into Fukushima Prefecture. In 1884, with the creation of the kazoku peerage system, Nagahiro received the title of shishaku (viscount). He died in 1886 and his brother Niwa Nagayasu (Uesugi Narinori's 11th son) became the 13th chieftain of the Niwa clan.
