= Niwa clan =

Niwa clan 丹羽
- Niwa clan emblem
- Home province: Owari Province
- Parent house: Kodama clan
- Final ruler: Niwa Nagahiro
- Founding year: Muromachi period
- Ruled until: 1873 (Abolition of the han system)
- Cadet branches: None

The Niwa clan (丹羽氏, Niwa-shi) was a Japanese samurai clan of northern Honshū that claimed descent from Emperor Kanmu via Prince Yoshimine no Yasuo (785-80) and Kodama Koreyuki (d.1069).

== History ==
The Kodama clan was one of several samurai clans originally located in Musashi Province. A branch of the clan settled in Owari Province, and a branch resided in the Niwa District. It is uncertain when they adopted the "Niwa" surname, but during the Muromachi period, they were in service of the Shiba clan, who were the shugo of Owari Province. The clan rose to prominence in the Sengoku period. Niwa Nagahide became a senior retainer of Oda Nobunaga and after Nobunaga was assassinated at the Honnō-ji Incident, helped Toyotomi Hideyoshi defeat the forces of Akechi Mitsuhide at the Battle of Yamazaki. He also assisted Hideyoshi at the Battle of Shizugatake, and was rewarded with the provinces of Wakasa and Echizen and two districts of Kaga Province, for a total kokudaka of 1,230,000 koku, making him one of the most powerful Sengoku-daimyō.

However, after Niwa Nagahide died in 1585, the clan's fortunes under Niwa Nagashige fell with equal rapidity. During the Siege of Toyama against the forces of Sassa Narimasa, Hideyoshi accused the Niwa clan with collaboration, and seized most of their territories, leaving the clan with only Wakasa Province at 150,000 koku. During the subsequent Kyūshū Campaign in 1589, one of the Niwa clan retainers was again accused of collaboration with the enemy, and the clan was reduced further to a small 40,000 koku holding around Komatsu in Kaga Province. However, Toyotomi Hideyoshi was mercurial in his moods, and in response to Niwa Nagashige's efforts at the Siege of Odawara, his status was brought back to 120,000 koku.

In 1600, the Niwa clan sided with Ishida Mitsunari's Western Army against the Tokugawa at the Battle of Sekigahara and was thus dispossessed. The victorious Tokugawa Ieyasu chose to be magnanimous, and with the establishment of the Tokugawa shogunate, awarded Niwa Nagashige with a 10,000 koku domain in Hitachi Province. Nagashige's forces fought well at the 1614 Siege of Osaka, and in 1619 his revenues were increased to 20,000 koku, and in 1622 he was transferred to the 50,000 koku Tanakura Domain in Mutsu Province. In 1627, he was transferred once again to Shirakawa Domain, at 100,700 koku.

In 1643, Nagashige's son, Niwa Mitsushige, as transferred to Nihonmatsu Domain (100,700 koku), where the clan remained until the Meiji restoration. During the Boshin War, Niwa Nagakuni joined the Ōuetsu Reppan Dōmei in 1868; however, his forces were defeated by the Satchō Alliance and Nihonmatsu Castle was burned. The victorious Meiji government reduced the domain to 50,700 koku under the final daimyō Niwa Nagahiro, who subsequently served as imperial governor until the abolition of the han system in 1871. In 1884, he became a viscount (shishaku) under the kazoku peerage system.

Another clan, the Isshiki-Niwa, who were daimyō of Mikusa Domain (10,000 koku) in Harima Province from 1746 to 1871, bears the same Niwa but is not directly related to the above.

== People with surname Niwa ==
- Koki Niwa, table tennis player
